= Genocide of Serbs in the Independent State of Croatia =

Genocide by the Ustaše during World War II

- Part of World War II in Yugoslavia
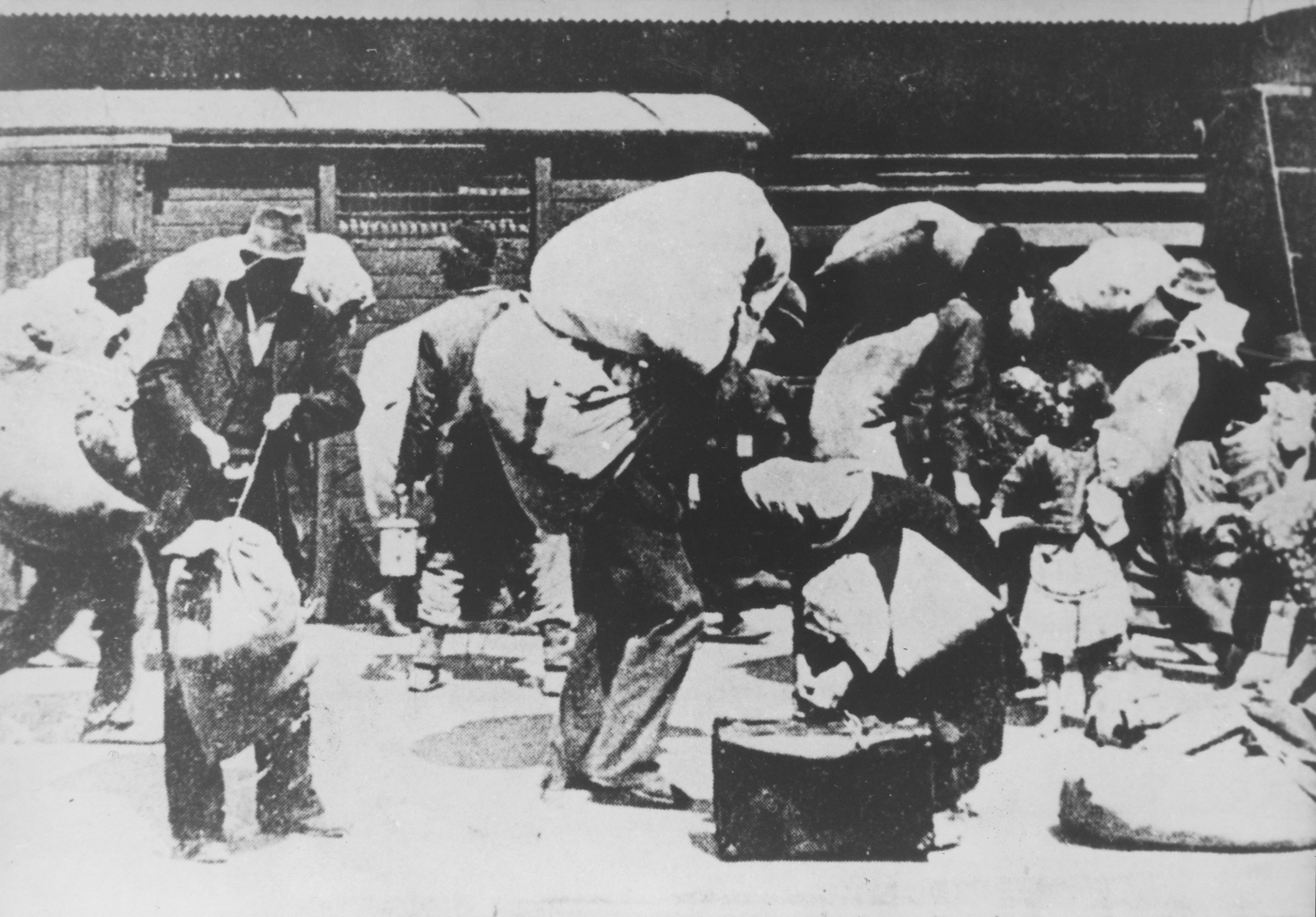
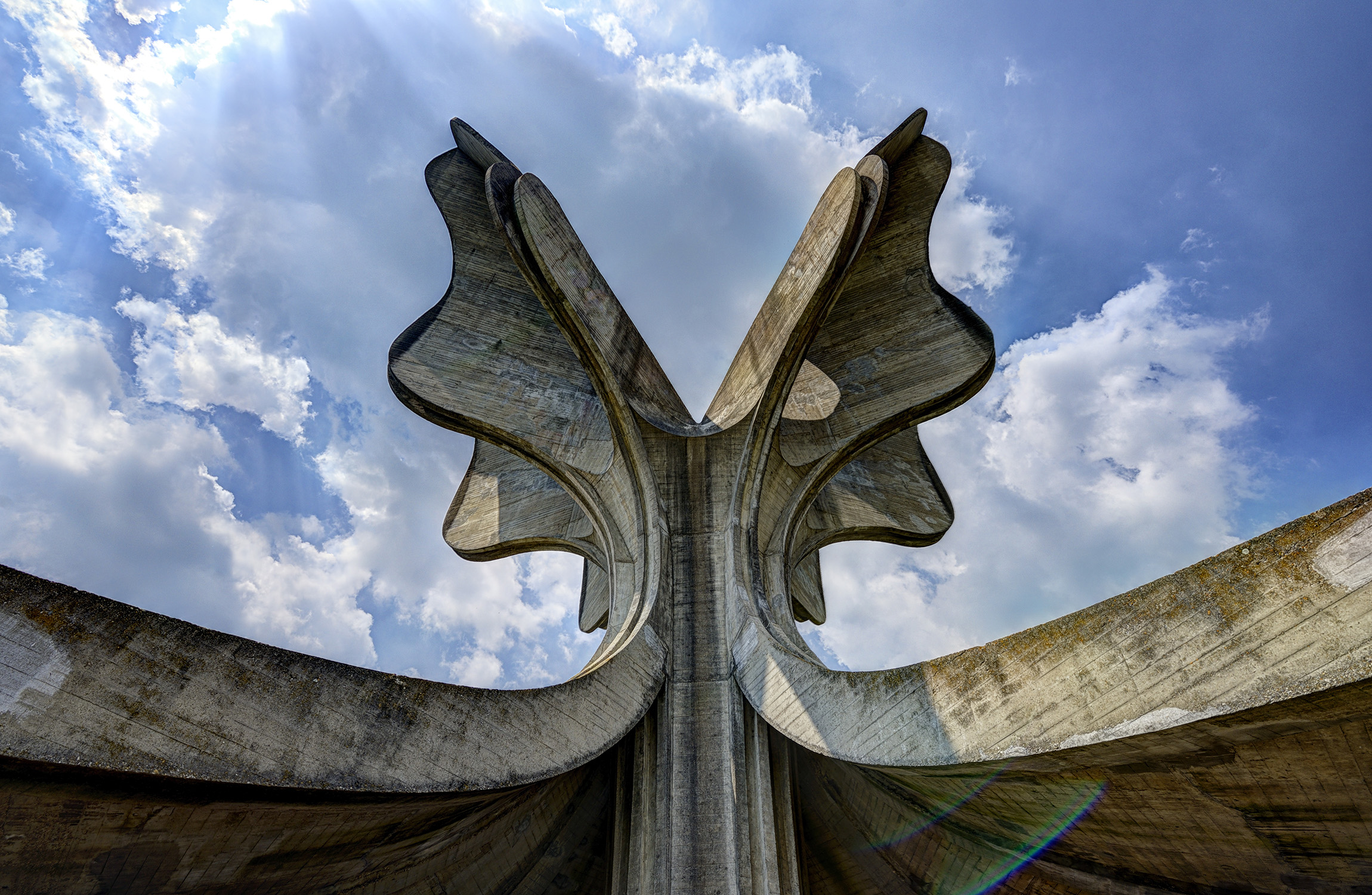
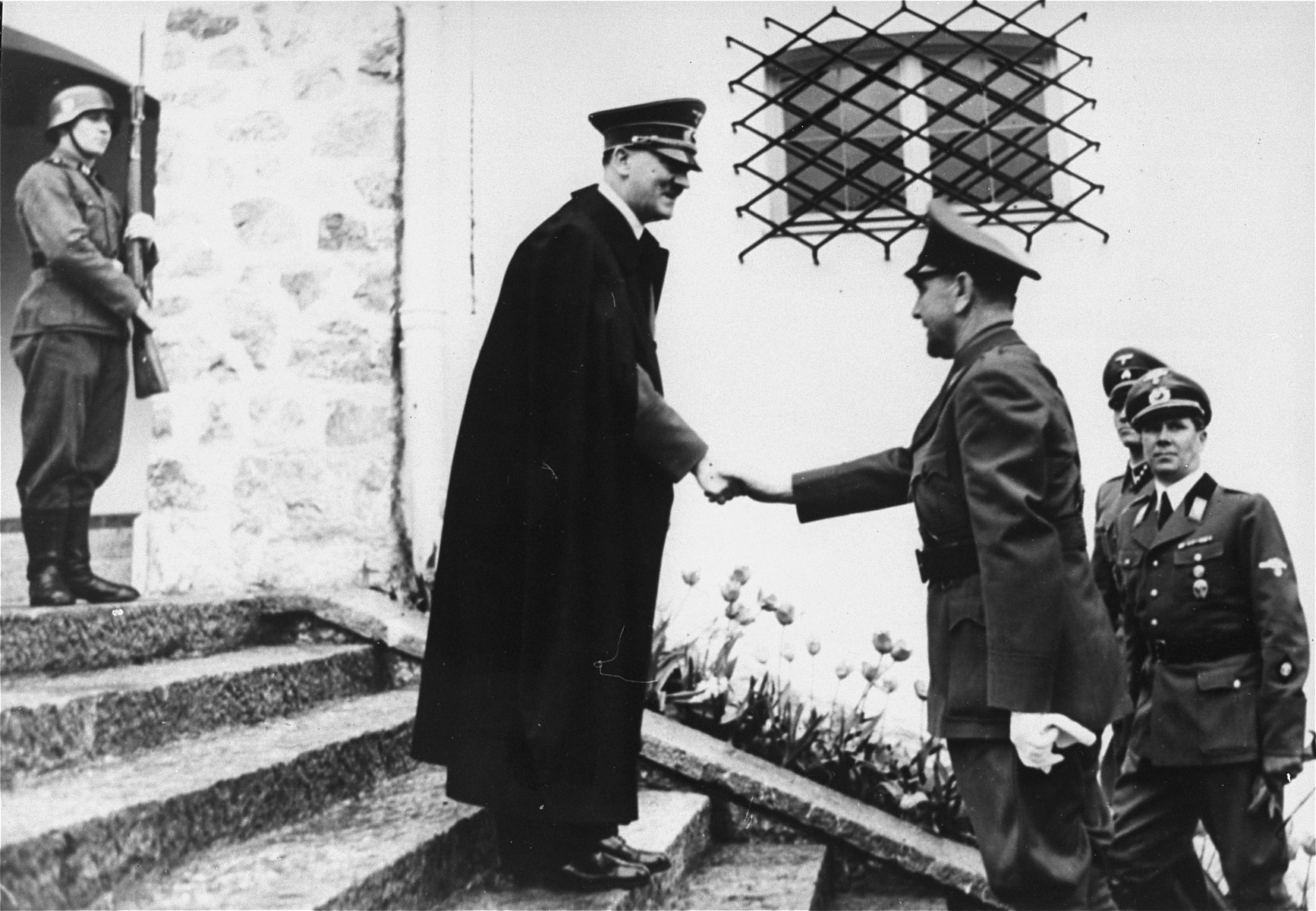
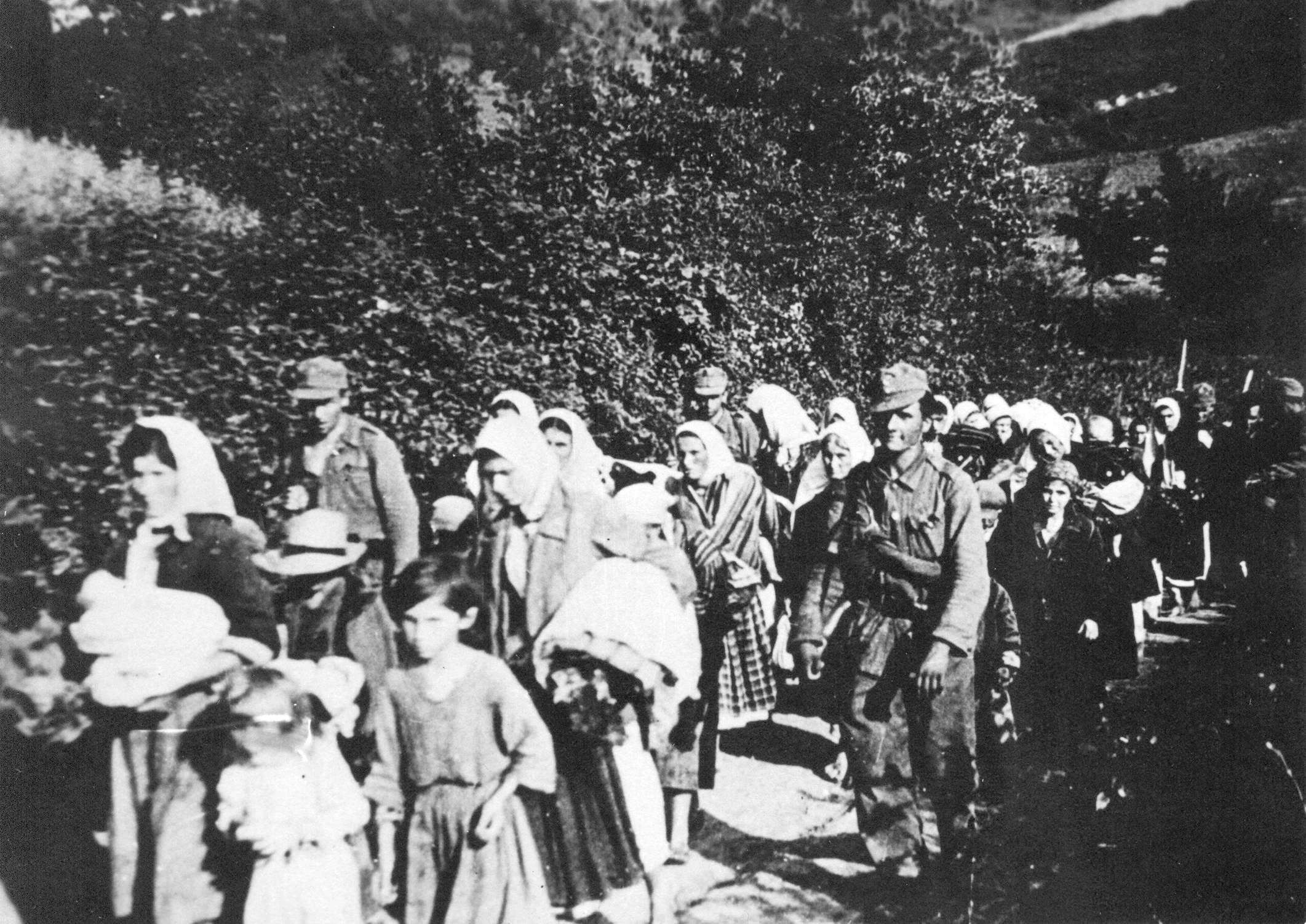
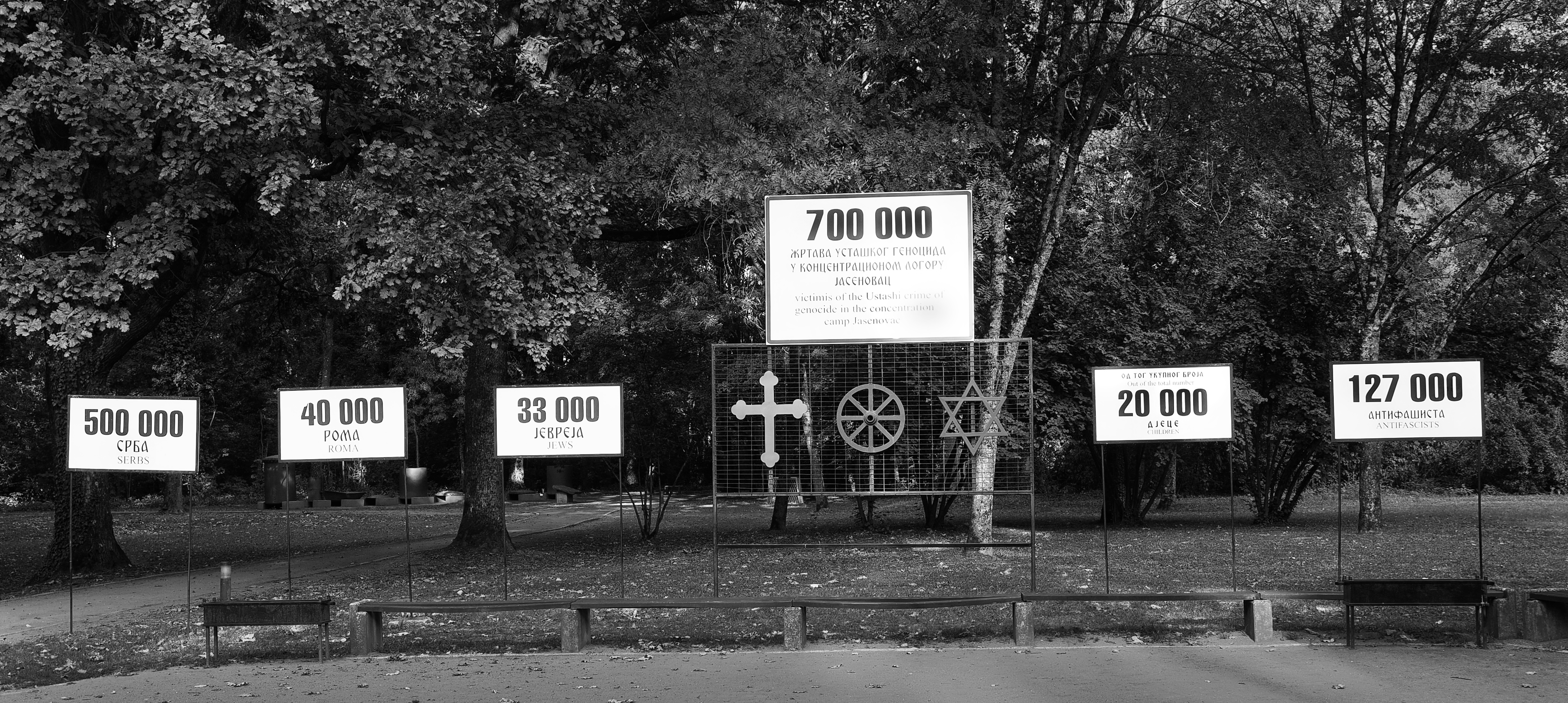
- (clockwise from top): Expelled Serbs marching out of town; Stone Flower, a monument in the Jasenovac death camp; An Ustaše guard among the bodies of murdered prisoners; Memorial Center in Gradina Donja; Ustasha with civilian prisoners after the Kozara Offensive; Adolf Hitler meets Ante Pavelić
- Location: Independent State of Croatia; (Axis-occupied Yugoslavia)
- Date: 1941–1945
- Target: Serbs (largely Serbs of Croatia and Bosnia and Herzegovina)
- Attack type: Genocide, ethnic cleansing, massacres, deportation, forced conversion, genocidal rape
- Deaths: Several estimates: 217,000; 300,000–350,000; 200,000–500,000
- Victims: Ethnic cleansing: ~300,000 Serbs expelled; >200,000 Serbs forcefully converted to Catholicism
- Perpetrator: Ustaše
- Motive: Anti-Serb sentiment, Croatian irredentism, anti-Yugoslavism, Croatisation

During World War II, Serbs were subjected to systematic persecution and genocide by the fascist Ustaše regime in the Nazi German puppet state known as the Independent State of Croatia (NDH) between 1941 and 1945. It was carried out through executions in death camps, as well as through mass killing, ethnic cleansing, deportations, forced conversions, and war rape. This genocide was simultaneously carried out with the Holocaust in the NDH as well as the genocide of Roma, by combining Nazi racial policies with the ultimate goal of creating an ethnically pure Greater Croatia.

The ideological foundation of the Ustaše movement reaches back to the 19th century. Several Croatian nationalists and intellectuals established theories about Serbs as an inferior race. The World War I legacy, as well as the opposition of a group of nationalists to the unification into a common state of South Slavs, influenced ethnic tensions in the newly formed Kingdom of Serbs, Croats and Slovenes (since 1929 Kingdom of Yugoslavia). The 6 January Dictatorship and the later anti-Croat policies of the Serb-dominated Yugoslav government in the 1920s and 1930s fueled the rise of nationalist and far-right movements. This culminated in the rise of the Ustaše, an ultranationalist, terrorist organization, founded by Ante Pavelić. The movement was financially and ideologically supported by Benito Mussolini, and it was also involved in the assassination of King Alexander I.

Following the Axis invasion of Yugoslavia in April 1941, a German puppet state known as the Independent State of Croatia was established, comprising most of modern-day Croatia and Bosnia and Herzegovina as well as parts of modern-day Serbia and Slovenia, ruled by the Ustaše. The Ustaše's goal was to create an ethnically homogeneous Greater Croatia by eliminating all non-Croats, with the Serbs being the primary target but Jews, Roma and political dissidents were also targeted for elimination. Large scale massacres were committed and concentration camps were built, the largest one was the Jasenovac, which was notorious for its high mortality rate and the barbaric practices which occurred in it. Furthermore, the NDH was the only Axis puppet state to establish concentration camps specifically for children. The regime systematically murdered approximately 200,000 to 500,000 Serbs. 300,000 Serbs were further expelled and at least 200,000 more Serbs were forcibly converted, most of whom de-converted following the war. Proportional to the population, the NDH was one of the most lethal European regimes.

Mile Budak and other NDH high officials were tried and convicted of war crimes by the communist authorities. Concentration camp commandants such as Ljubo Miloš and Miroslav Filipović were captured and executed, while Aloysius Stepinac was found guilty of forced conversion. Many others escaped, including the supreme leader Ante Pavelić, most to Latin America. The genocide was not properly examined in the aftermath of the war, because the post-war Yugoslav government did not encourage independent scholars out of concern that ethnic tensions would destabilize the new communist regime. Nowadays, оn 22 April, Serbia marks the public holiday dedicated to the victims of genocide and fascism, while Croatia holds an official commemoration at the Jasenovac Memorial Site.

== Historical background ==
The ideological foundation of the Ustaše movement reaches back to the 19th century when Ante Starčević established the Party of Rights, as well as when Josip Frank seceded his extreme fraction from it and formed his own Pure Party of Rights. Starčević was a major ideological influence on the Croatian nationalism of the Ustaše. He was an advocate of Croatian unity and independence and was both anti-Habsburg, as Starčević saw the main Croatian enemy in the Habsburg Monarchy, and anti-Serb. He envisioned the creation of a Greater Croatia that would include territories inhabited by Bosniaks, Serbs, and Slovenes, considering Bosniaks and Serbs to be Croats who had been converted to Islam and Eastern Orthodox Christianity. In his demonization of the Serbs he claimed "how the Serbs today are dangerous for their ideas and their racial composition, how a bent for conspiracies, revolutions and coups is in their blood." Starčević called the Serbs an "unclean race", a "nomadic people" and "a race of slaves, the most loathsome beasts", while the co-founder of his party, Eugen Kvaternik, denied the existence of Serbs in Croatia, seeing their political consciousness as a threat. Milovan Đilas cites Starčević as the "father of racism" and "ideological father" of the Ustaše, while some Ustaše ideologues have linked Starčević's racial ideas to Adolf Hitler's racial ideology.

Frank's party embraced Starčević's position that Serbs were an obstacle to Croatian political and territorial ambitions, and the aggressive anti-Serb attitudes became one of the main characteristics of the party. The followers of the ultranationalist Pure Party of Right were known as the Frankists (Frankovci) and they would become the main pool of members of the subsequent Ustaše movement. Following the defeat of the Central Powers in World War I and the collapse of Austria-Hungarian Empire, the provisional state was formed on the southern territories of the Empire which joined the Allies-associate Kingdom of Serbia to form the Kingdom of Serbs, Croats and Slovenes (later known as Yugoslavia), ruled by the Serbian Karađorđević dynasty. Historian John Paul Newman explained that the influence of the Frankists, as well as the legacy of World War I, had an impact on the Ustaše ideology and their future genocidal means. Many war veterans had fought at various ranks and on various fronts on both the 'victorious' and 'defeated' sides of the war. Serbia suffered the biggest casualty rate in the world, while Croats fought in the Austro-Hungarian army and two of them served as military governors of Bosnia and occupied Serbia. They both endorsed Austria–Hungary's denationalizing plans in Serb-populated lands and supported the idea of incorporating a tamed Serbia into the Empire. Newman stated that Austro-Hungarian officers' "unfaltering opposition to Yugoslavia provided a blueprint for the Croatian radical right, the Ustaše". The Frankists blamed Serbian nationalists for the defeat of Austria-Hungary and opposed the creation of Yugoslavia, which was identified by them as a cover for Greater Serbia. Мass Croatian national consciousness appeared after the establishment of a common state of South Slavs and it was directed against the new Kingdom, more precisely against Serbian predominance within it.

Early 20th century Croatian intellectuals Ivo Pilar, Ćiro Truhelka and Milan Šufflay influenced the Ustaše concept of nation and racial identity, as well as the theory of Serbs as an inferior race. Pilar, historian, politician and lawyer, placed great emphasis on racial determinism arguing that Croats had been defined by the "Nordic-Aryan" racial and cultural heritage, while Serbs had "interbred" with the "Balkan-Romanic Vlachs". Truhelka, archeologist and historian, claimed that Bosnian Muslims were ethnic Croats, who, according to him, belonged to the racially superior Nordic race. On the other hand, Serbs belonged to the "degenerate race" of the Vlachs. The Ustaše promoted the theories of historian and politician Šufflay, who is believed to have claimed that Croatia had been "one of the strongest ramparts of Western civilization for many centuries", which he claimed had been lost through its union with Serbia when the nation of Yugoslavia was formed in 1918.

The outburst of Croatian nationalism after 1918 was one of the main threats for Yugoslavia's stability. During the 1920s, Ante Pavelić, lawyer, politician and one of the Frankists, emerged as a leading spokesman for Croatian independence. In 1927, he secretly contacted Benito Mussolini, dictator of Italy and founder of fascism, and presented his separatist ideas to him. Pavelić proposed an independent Greater Croatia that should cover the entire historical and ethnic area of the Croats. In that period, Mussolini was interested in Balkans with the aim of isolating Yugoslavia, by strengthening Italian influence on the east coast of the Adriatic Sea. British historian Rory Yeomans claims that there are indication that Pavelić had been considering the formation of some kind of nationalist insurgency group as early as 1928.

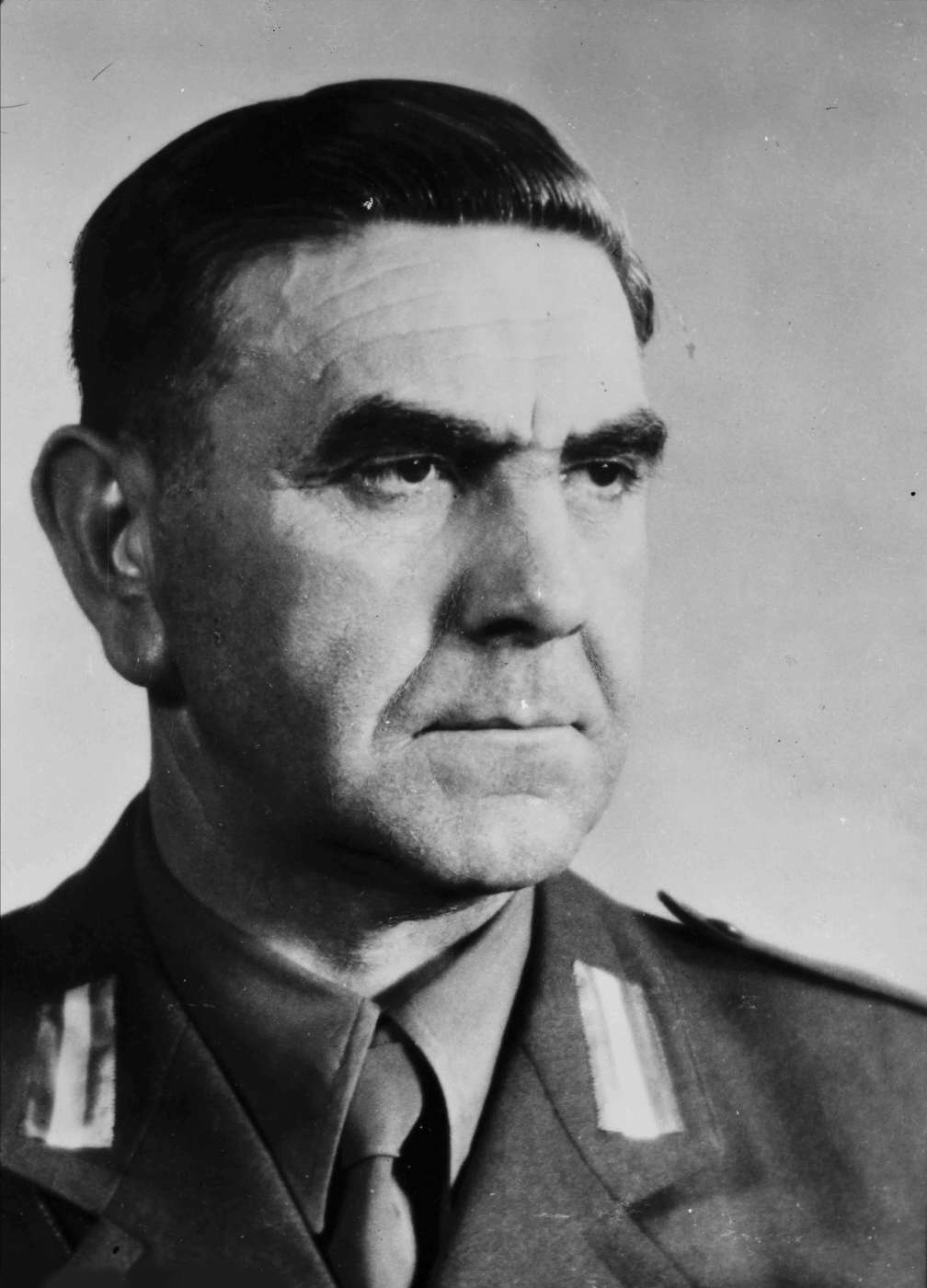
Ante Pavelić, one of the Frankists and the leading spokesman for Croatian independence in interwar Yugoslavia, founded the Ustaše movement

In June 1928, Stjepan Radić, the leader of the largest and most popular Croatian party Croatian Peasant Party (Hrvatska seljačka stranka, HSS) was mortally wounded in the parliamentary chamber by Puniša Račić, a Montenegrin Serb leader, former Chetnik member and deputy of the ruling Serb People's Radical Party. Račić also shot two other HSS deputies dead and wounded two more. The killings provoked violent student protests in Zagreb. Trying to suppress the conflict between Croatian and Serbian political parties, King Alexander I proclaimed a dictatorship with the aim of establishing the "integral Yugoslavism" and a single Yugoslav nation. The introduction of the royal dictatorship brought separatist forces to the fore, especially among the Croats and Macedonians. The Ustaša – Croatian Revolutionary Movement (Croatian: Ustaša – Hrvatski revolucionarni pokret) emerged as the most extreme movement of these. The Ustaše was created in late 1929 or early 1930 among radical and militant student and youth groups, which existed from the late 1920s. Precisely, the movement was founded by journalist Gustav Perčec and Ante Pavelić. They were driven by a deep hatred of Serbs and Serbdom and claimed that, "Croats and Serbs were separated by an unbridgeable cultural gulf" which prevented them from ever living alongside each other. Pavelić accused the Belgrade government of propagating "a barbarian culture and Gypsy civilization", claiming they were spreading "atheism and bestial mentality in divine Croatia". Supporters of the Ustaše planned genocide years before World War II, for example one of Pavelić's main ideologues, Mijo Babić, wrote in 1932 that the Ustaše "will cleanse and cut whatever is rotten from the healthy body of the Croatian people". In 1933, the Ustaše presented "The Seventeen Principles" that formed the official ideology of the movement. The Principles stated the uniqueness of the Croatian nation, promoted collective rights over individual rights and declared that people who were not Croat by "blood" would be excluded from political life.

In order to explain what they saw as a "terror machine", and regularly referred to as "some excesses" by individuals, the Ustaše cited, among other things, policies of the inter-war Yugoslav government which they described as Serbian hegemony "that cost the lives of thousand Croats". Historian Jozo Tomasevich explains that that argument is not true, claiming that between December 1918 and April 1941 about 280 Croats were killed for political reasons, and that no specific motive for the killings could be identified, as they may also be linked to clashes during the agrarian reform. Moreover, he stated that Serbs too were denied civil and political rights during the royal dictatorship. However, Tomasevich explains that the anti-Croatian policies of the Serbian-dominated Yugoslav government in the 1920s and 1930s, as well as, the shooting of the HSS deputies by Radić were largely responsible for the creation, growth and nature of Croatian nationalist forces. This culminated in the Ustaše movement and ultimately its anti-Serbian policies in World War II, which was totally out of proportions to earlier anti-Croatian measures, in nature and extent. Yeomans explains that Ustaše officials constantly emphasized crimes against Croats by the Yugoslav government and security forces, although many of them were imagined, though some of them real, as justification for their envisioned eradication of the Serbs. Political scientist Tamara Pavasović Trošt, commenting on historiography and textbooks, listed the claims that terror against Serbs arose as a result of "their previous hegemony" as an example of the relativisation of Ustaše crimes. Historian Aristotle Kallis explained that anti-Serb prejudices were a "chimera" which emerged through living together in Yugoslavia with continuity with previous stereotypes.

The Ustaše functioned as a terrorist organization as well. The first Ustaše center was established in Vienna, where brisk anti-Yugoslav propaganda soon developed and agents were prepared for terrorist actions. They organized the so-called Velebit uprising in 1932, assaulting a police station in the village of Brušani in Lika. In 1934, the Ustaše cooperated with Bulgarian, Hungarian and Italian right-wing extremists to assassinate King Alexander while he visited the French city of Marseille. Pavelić's fascist tendencies were apparent. The Ustaše movement was financially and ideologically supported by Benito Mussolini. During the intensification of ties with Nazi Germany in the 1930s, Pavelić's concept of the Croatian nation became increasingly race-oriented.

== Independent State of Croatia ==
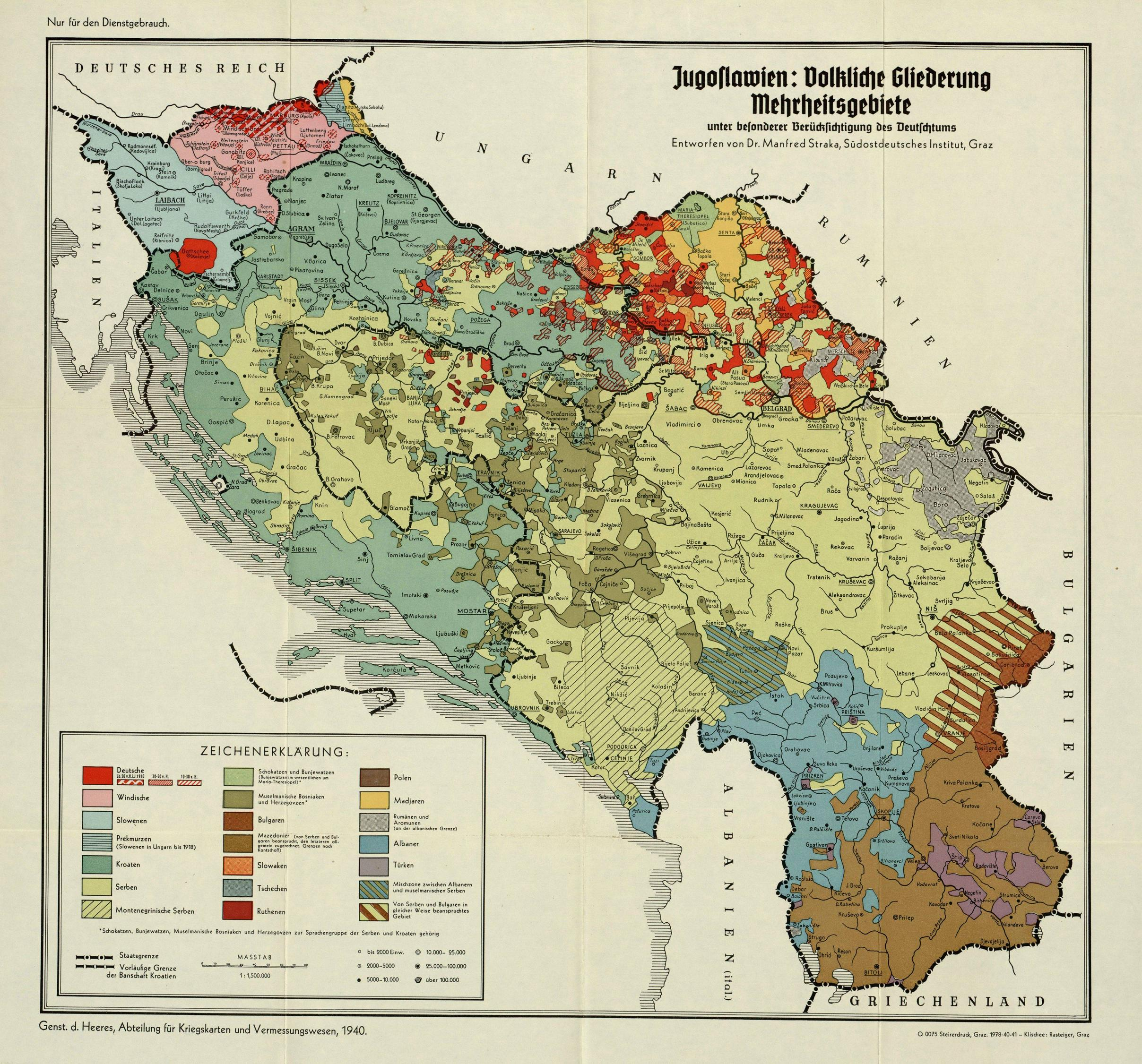
Kingdom of Yugoslavia's ethnic map 1940
Serbs (including Montenegrin Serbs)
Croats
Bosnian Muslims
Germans (Danube Swabians)

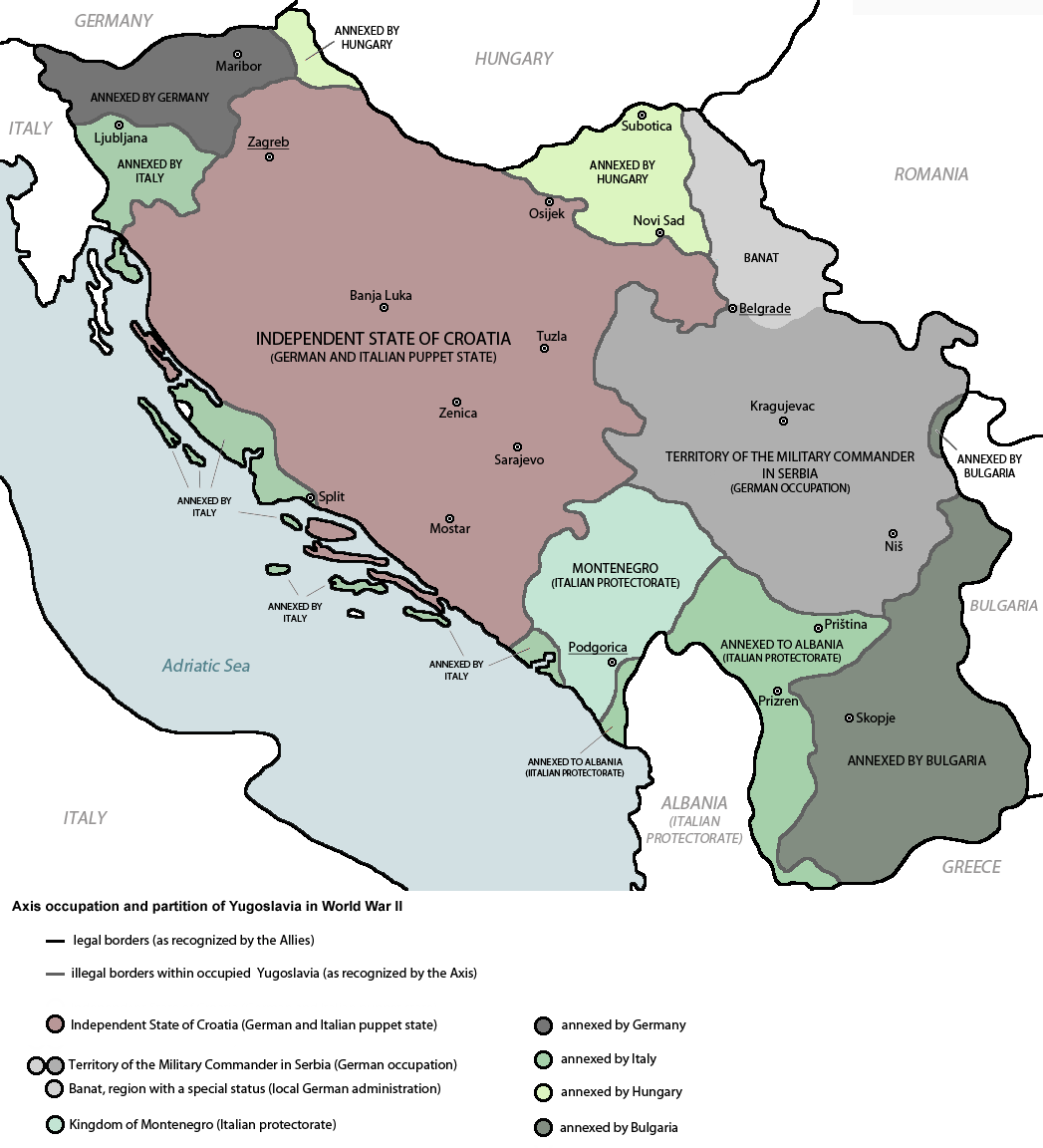
Occupation and partition of Yugoslavia after the Axis invasion

In April 1941, the Kingdom of Yugoslavia was invaded by the Axis powers. After Nazi forces entered Zagreb on 10 April 1941, Pavelić's closest associate Slavko Kvaternik, proclaimed the formation of the Independent State of Croatia (NDH) on a Radio Zagreb broadcast. Meanwhile, Pavelić and several hundred Ustaše volunteers left their camps in Italy and travelled to Zagreb, where Pavelić declared a new government on 16 April 1941. He accorded himself the title of "Poglavnik" (German: Führer, English: Chief leader). The NDH combined most of modern Croatia, all of modern Bosnia and Herzegovina and parts of modern Serbia into an "Italian-German quasi-protectorate". Serbs made up about 30% of the NDH population. The NDH was never fully sovereign, but it was a puppet state that enjoyed the greatest autonomy than any other regime in German-occupied Europe. The Independent State of Croatia was declared to be on Croatian "ethnic and historical territory".

This country can only be a Croatian country, and there is no method we would hesitate to use in order to make it truly Croatian and cleanse it of Serbs, who have for centuries endangered us and who will endanger us again if they are given the opportunity.

— Milovan Žanić, the minister of the NDH government, on 2 May 1941.

The Ustaše became obsessed with creating an ethnically pure state. As outlined by Ustaše ministers Mile Budak, Mirko Puk and Milovan Žanić, the strategy to achieve an ethnically pure Croatia was that:

1. One-third of the Serbs were to be killed
2. One-third of the Serbs were to be expelled
3. One-third of the Serbs were to be forcibly converted to Catholicism

According to historian Ivo Goldstein, this formula was never published but it is undeniable that the Ustaše applied it towards Serbs.

The Ustaše movement received limited support from ordinary Croats. In May 1941, the Ustaše had about 100,000 members who took the oath. Since Vladko Maček reluctantly called on the supporters of the Croatian Peasant Party to respect and co-operate with the new regime of Ante Pavelić, he was able to use the apparatus of the party and most of the officials from the former Croatian Banovina. Initially, Croatian soldiers who had previously served in the Austro-Hungarian army held the highest positions in the NDH armed forces.

Historian Irina Ognyanova stated that the similarities between the NDH and the Third Reich included the assumption that terror and genocide were necessary for the preservation of the state. Viktor Gutić made several speeches in early summer 1941, calling Serbs "former enemies" and "unwanted elements" to be cleansed and destroyed, and also threatened Croats who did not support their cause. Much of the ideology of the Ustaše was based on Nazi racial theory. Like the Nazis, the Ustaše deemed Jews, Romani, and Slavs to be sub-humans (Untermensch). They endorsed the claims from German racial theorists that Croats were not Slavs but a Germanic race. Their genocides against Serbs, Jews, and Romani were thus expressions of Nazi racial ideology. Adolf Hitler supported Pavelić in order to punish the Serbs. Historian Michael Phayer explained that the Nazis' decision to kill all of Europe's Jews is estimated by some to have begun in the latter half of 1941 in late June which, if correct, would mean that the genocide in Croatia began before the Nazi killing of Jews. Jonathan Steinberg stated that the crimes against Serbs in the NDH were the "earliest total genocide to be attempted during the World War II".

Andrija Artuković, the Minister of Interior of the Independent State of Croatia, signed into law a number of racial laws. On 30 April 1941, the government adopted "the legal order of races" and "the legal order of the protection of Atyan blood and the honor of Croatian people". Croats and about 750,000 Bosnian Muslims, whose support was needed against the Serbs, were proclaimed Aryans. Donald Bloxham and Robert Gerwarth concluded that Serbs were primary target of racial laws and murders. The Ustaše introduced the laws to strip Serbs of their citizenship, livelihoods, and possessions. Similar to Jews in the Third Reich, Serbs were forced to wear armbands bearing the letter "P", for Pravoslavac (Orthodox). (Likewise, Jews were forced to wear the armband with the letter "Ž", fort Židov (Jew). Ustaše writers adopted dehumanizing rhetoric. In 1941, the usage of the Cyrillic script was banned, and in June 1941 began the elimination of "Eastern" (Serbian) words from Croatian, as well as the shutting down of Serbian schools. Ante Pavelić ordered, through the "Croatian state office for language", the creation of new words from old roots, and purged many Serbian words.

Whereas the Ustaše persecution of Jews and Roma was systematic and represented an implementation of Nazi policies, their persecution of Serbs was rooted in a stronger "home grown" form of hatred, implemented with more variance due to the larger Serb population found across rural areas. This was done despite the fact it would degrade support for the regime, fueled Serb rebellion and jeopardized the stability of the NDH. The level of violence enacted against Serb communities often depended more on the intercommunal relations and inclinations of the respective local Ustaše warlords than a well-structured policy.

== Concentration and extermination camps ==
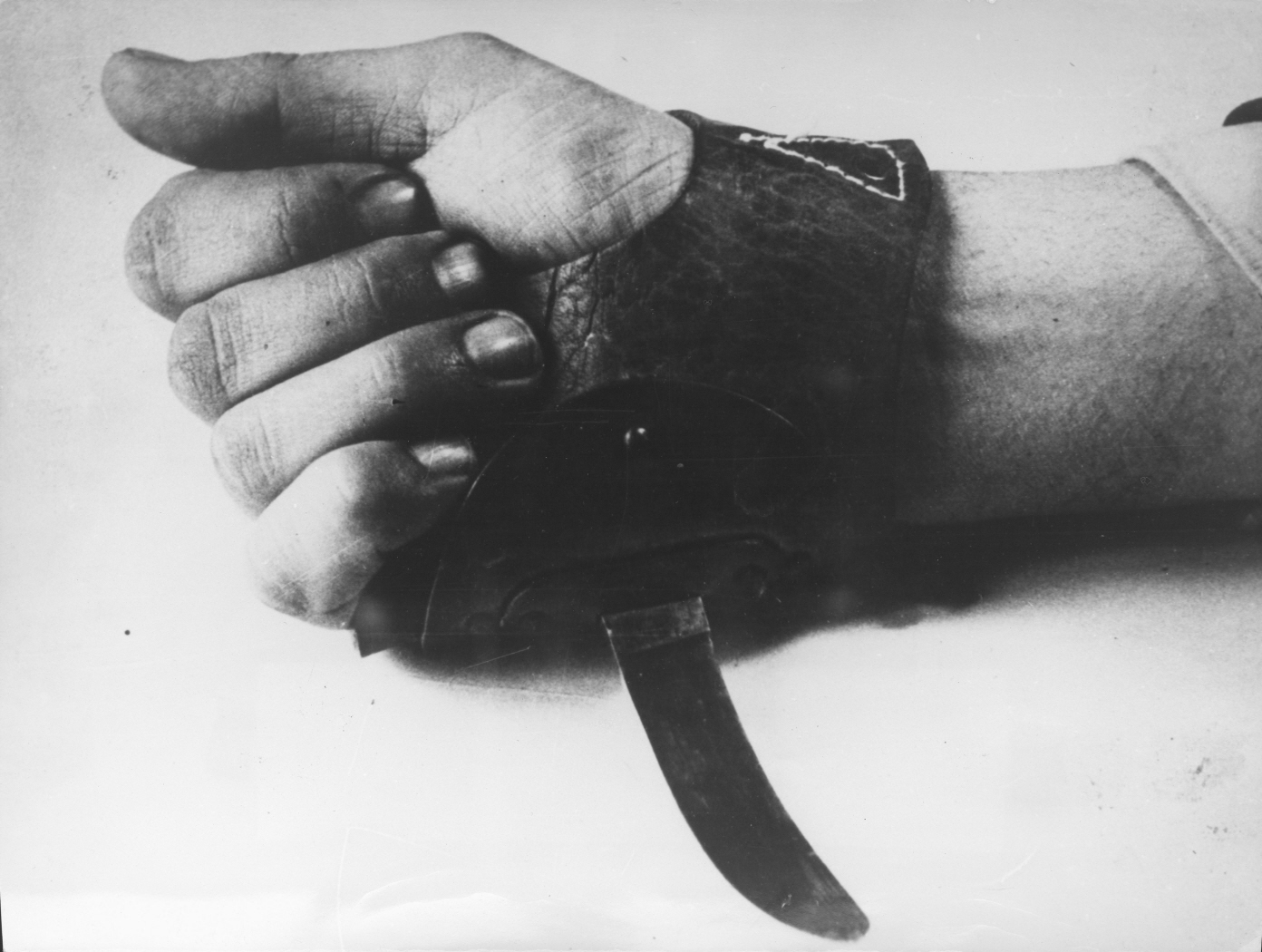
The Srbosjek ("Serb cutter"), an agricultural knife worn over the hand that was used by the Ustaše for the quick slaughter of inmates.

The Ustaše set up temporary concentration camps in the spring of 1941 and laid the groundwork for a network of permanent camps in autumn. The creation of concentration camps and extermination campaign of Serbs had been planned by the Ustaše leadership long before 1941. In Ustaše state exhibits in Zagreb, the camps were portrayed as productive and "peaceful work camps", with photographs of smiling inmates.

Serbs, Jews and Romani were arrested and sent to concentration camps such as Jasenovac, Stara Gradiška, Gospić and Jadovno. There were 22–26 camps in NDH in total. Historian Jozo Tomasevich described that the Jadovno concentration camp itself acted as a "way station" en route to pits located on Mount Velebit, where inmates were executed and dumped.

Approximately 90,000 of the Serb victims of genocide perished in concentration camps; the rest were killed in "direct terror", i.e. Punitive expeditions and razing of villages, pogroms, massacres and sporadic executions which mainly occurred between 1941 and 1942.

The largest and most notorious camp was the Jasenovac-Stara Gradiška complex, the largest extermination camp in the Balkans. An estimated 100,000 inmates perished there, most Serbs. Vjekoslav "Maks" Luburić, the commander-in-chief of all the Croatian camps, announced the great "efficiency" of the Jasenovac camp at a ceremony on 9 October 1942, and also boasted: "We have slaughtered here at Jasenovac more people than the Ottoman Empire was able to do during its occupation of Europe."

Bounded by rivers and two barbed-wire fences making escape unlikely, the Jasenovac camp was divided into five camps, the first two closed in December 1941, while the rest were active until the end of the war. Stara Gradiška (Jasenovac V) held women and children. The Ciglana (brickyards, Jasenovac III) camp, the main killing ground and essentially a death camp, had 88% mortality rate, higher than Auschwitz's 84.6%. A former brickyard, a furnace was engineered into a crematorium, with witness testimony of some, including children, being burnt alive and stench of human flesh spreading in the camp. Luburić had a gas chamber built at Jasenovac V, where a considerable number of inmates were killed during a three-month experiment with sulfur dioxide and Zyklon B, but this method was abandoned due to poor construction. Still, that method was unnecessary, as most inmates perished from starvation, disease (especially typhus), assaults with mallets, maces, axes, poison and knives. The srbosjek ("Serb-cutter") was a glove with an attached curved blade designed to cut throats. Large groups of people were regularly executed upon arrival outside camps and thrown into the river. Unlike German-run camps, Jasenovac specialized in brutal one-on-one violence, such as guards attacking barracks with weapons and throwing the bodies in the trenches. Some historians use a sentence from German sources: "Even German officers and SS men lost their cool when they saw (Ustaše) ways and methods."

The infamous camp commander Filipović, dubbed fra Sotona ("brother Satan") and the "personification of evil", on one occasion drowned Serb women and children by flooding a cellar. Filipović and other camp commanders (such as Dinko Šakić and his wife Nada Šakić, the sister of Maks Luburić), used ingenious torture. There were throat-cutting contests of Serbs, in which prison guards made bets among themselves as to who could slaughter the most inmates. It was reported that guard and former Franciscan priest Petar Brzica won a contest on 29 August 1942 after cutting the throats of 1,360 inmates. Inmates were tied and hit over the head with mallets and half-alive hung in groups by the Granik ramp crane, their intestines and necks slashed, then dropped into the river. When the Partisans and Allies closed in at the end of the war, the Ustaše began mass liquidations at Jasenovac, marching women and children to death, and shooting most of the remaining male inmates, then torched buildings and documents before fleeing. Many prisoners were victims of rape, sexual mutilation and disembowelment, while induced cannibalism amongst the inmates also took place. Some survivors testified about drinking blood from the slashed throats of the victims and soap making from human corpses.

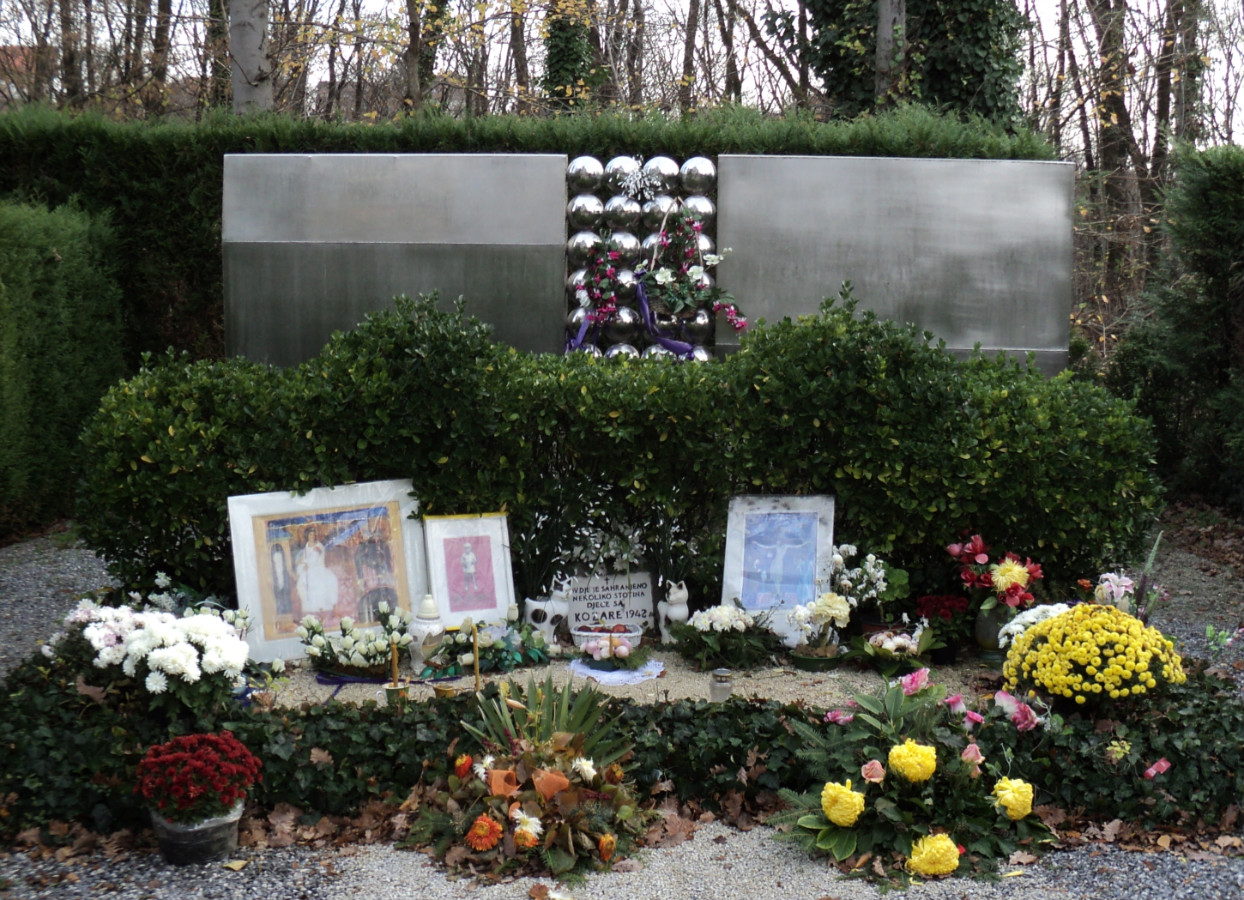
Monument at the Mirogoj Cemetery in Zagreb dedicated to the children from Kozara who died in Ustaše concentration camps

=== Children's concentration camps ===
The Independent State of Croatia was the only Axis satellite to have erected camps specifically for children. Special camps for children were those at Sisak, Đakovo and Jastrebarsko, while Stara Gradiška held thousands of children and women. Historian Tomislav Dulić explained that the systematic murder of infants and children, who could not pose a threat to the state, serves as one important illustration of the genocidal character of Ustaša mass killing.

The Holocaust and genocide survivors, including Božo Švarc, testified that Ustaše tore off the children's hands, as well as, "apply a liquid to children's mouths with brushes", which caused the children to scream and later die. The Sisak camp commander, the physician Antun Najžer, was dubbed the "Croatian Mengele" by survivors.

Diana Budisavljević, a humanitarian of Austrian descent, carried out rescue operations and saved more than 15,000 children from Ustaše camps.

=== List of concentration and death camps ===
- Jasenovac (I–IV) — around 100,000 inmates perished there, at least 52,000 Serbs
- Stara Gradiška (Jasenovac V) — more than 12,000 inmates lost their lives, mostly Serbs
- Gospić — between 24,000 and 42,000 inmates died, predominantly Serbs

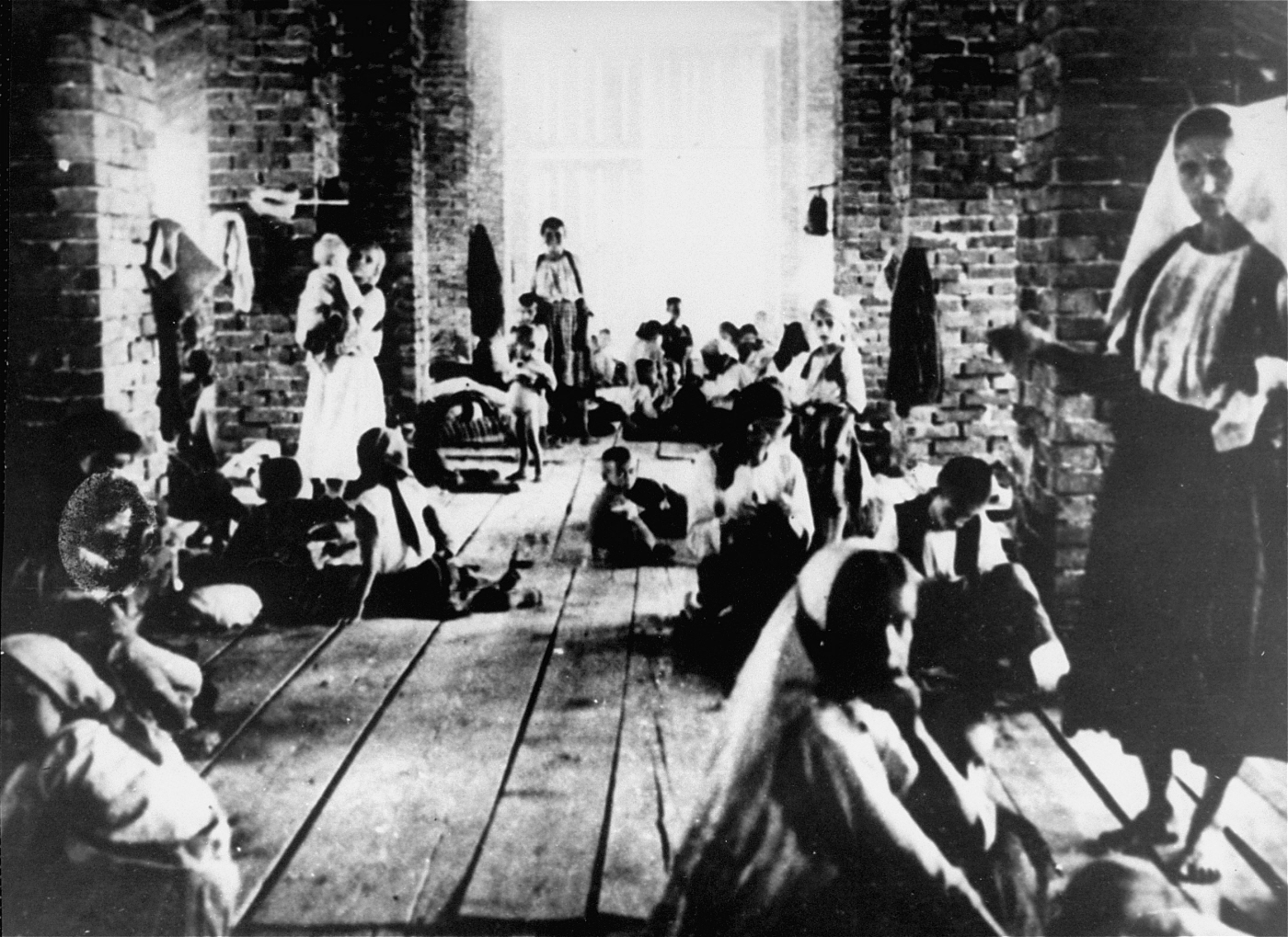
Stara Gradiška concentration camp

- Jadovno — between 15,000 and 48,000 Serbs and Jews perished there
- Slana and Metajna — between 4,000 and 12,000 Serbs, Jews and communists died
- Sisak — 6,693 children passed through the camp, mostly Serbs, between 1,152 and 1,630 died
- Danica — around 5,000, mostly Serbs, were transported to the camp, some of them were executed
- Jastrebarsko — 3,336 Serb children passing through the camp, between 449 and 1,500 died
- Kruščica — around 5,000 Jews and Serbs were interned at the camp, while 3,000 lost their lives
- Đakovo — 3,800 Jewish and Serb women and children were interned at the camp, at least 569 died
- Lobor — more than 2,000 Jewish and Serb women and children were interned, at least 200 died
- Kerestinec — 111 Serbs, Jews and communists were captured, 85 were killed
- Sajmište — the camp at the NDH territory operated by the Einsatzgruppen and since May 1944 by Ustaše; between 20,000 and 23,000 Serbs, Jews, Roma and anti-fascists died here
- Hrvatska Mitrovica — the concentration camp in Sremska Mitrovica

== Massacres ==
A large number of massacres were committed by the NDH armed forces, Croatian Home Guard (Domobrani) and Ustaše Militia.

The Ustaše Militia was organised in 1941 into five (later 15) 700-man battalions, two railway security battalions and the elite Black Legion and Poglavnik Bodyguard Battalion (later Brigade). They were predominantly recruited among the uneducated population and working class.

Besides ethnic Croats, the militia also contained Muslims where they accounted for an estimated 30% of the membership.

Violence against Serbs began in April 1941 and was initially limited in scope, primarily targeting Serb intelligentsia. By July however, the violence became "indiscriminate, widespread and systematic". Massacres of Serbs were focused in mixed areas with large Serb populations for necessity and efficiency.

In the summer of 1941, Ustaše militias and death squads burnt villages and killed thousands of civilian Serbs in the country-side in sadistic ways with various weapons and tools. Men, women, children were hacked to death, thrown alive into pits and down ravines, or set on fire in churches. Firearms were rarely used; instead, knives, axes, and similar weapons were more common. Serb victims were dismembered, their ears and tongues cut off and eyes gouged out. Some Serb villages near Srebrenica and Ozren were wholly massacred while children were found impaled by stakes in villages between Vlasenica and Kladanj. The Ustaše cruelty and sadism shocked even Nazi commanders. A Gestapo report to Reichsführer SS Heinrich Himmler, dated 17 February 1942, stated:

Increased activity of the bands [of rebels] is chiefly due to atrocities carried out by Ustaše units in Croatia against the Orthodox population. The Ustaše committed their deeds in a bestial manner not only against males of conscript age, but especially against helpless old people, women and children. The number of the Orthodox that the Croats have massacred and sadistically tortured to death is about three hundred thousand.

The Ustaše's preference for cold weapons in carrying out their deeds was partly a result of the shortage of ammunition and firearms in the early course of the war, but also demonstrated the importance the regime placed on the cult of violence and personal slaughter, in particular through the usage of the knife.

Charles King emphasized that concentration camps are losing their central place in Holocaust and genocide research because a large proportion of victims perished in mass executions, ravines and pits. He explained that the actions of the German allies, including the Croatian one, and the town- and village-level elimination of minorities also played a significant role.

=== Central Croatia ===
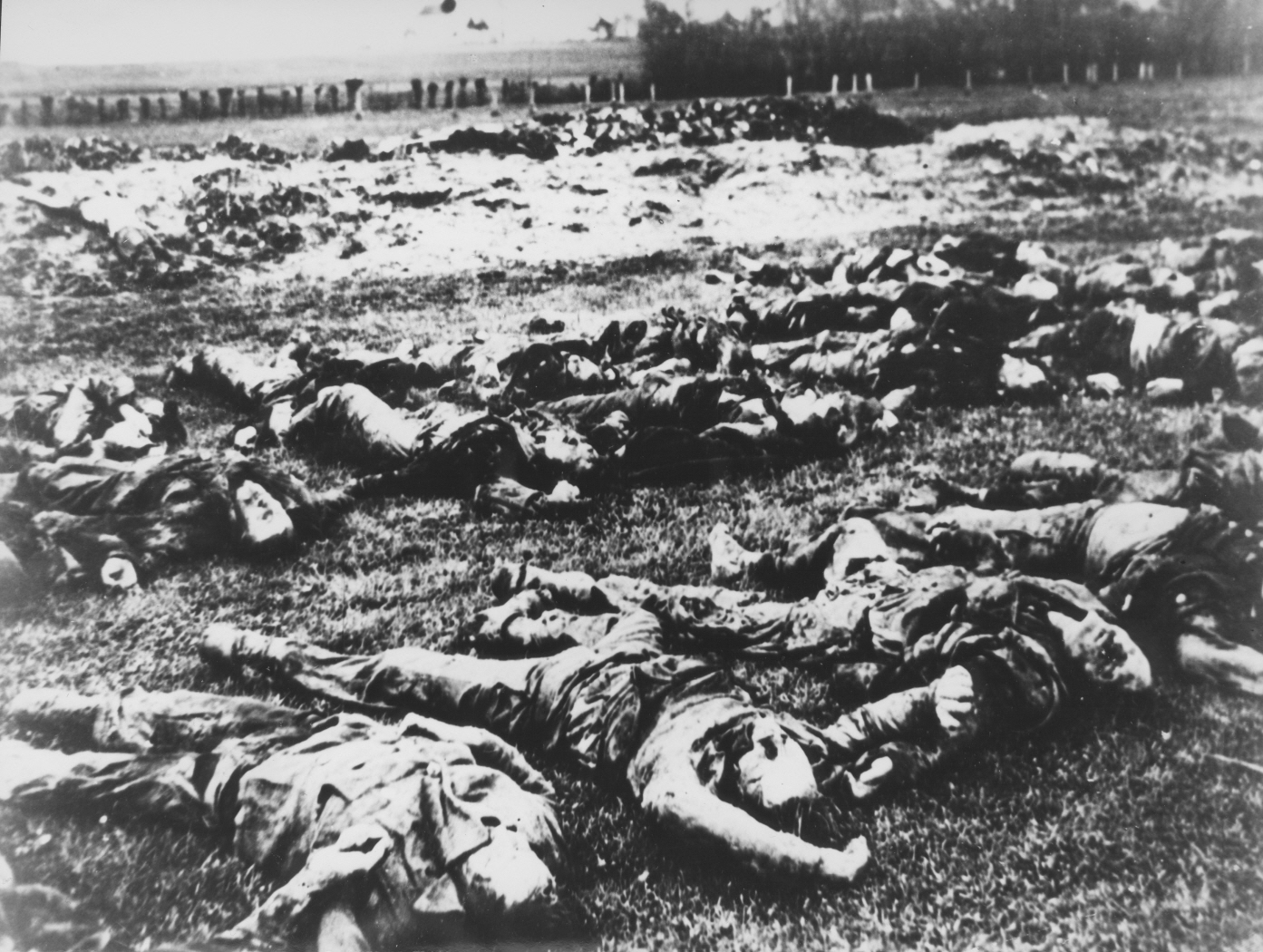
Bodies of victims of the Gudovac massacre

On 28 April 1941, approximately 184–196 Serbs from Bjelovar were summarily executed, after arrest orders by Kvaternik. It was the first act of mass murder committed by the Ustaše upon coming to power, and presaged the wider campaign of genocide against Serbs in the NDH that lasted until the end of the war. A few days following the massacre of Bjelovar Serbs, the Ustaše rounded up 331 Serbs in the village of Otočac. The victims were forced to dig their own graves before being hacked to death with axes. Among the victims was the local Orthodox priest and his son. The former was made to recite prayers for the dying as his son was killed. The priest was then tortured, his hair and beard was pulled out, eyes gouged out before he was skinned alive.

On 24–25 July 1941, the Ustaše militia captured the village of Banski Grabovac in the Banija region and murdered the entire Serb population of 1,100 peasants. On 24 July, over 800 Serb civilians were killed in the village of Vlahović.

Between 29 June and 7 July 1941, 280 Serbs were killed and thrown into pits near Kostajnica. Large scale massacres took place in Staro Selo Topusko, including in the village of Pecka with 250 victims, and Perna where 427 old men and children were killed. A large number were also killed in Vojišnica and Vrginmost. About 60% of Sadilovac residents lost their lives during the war. More than 400 Serbs were killed in their homes, including 185 children. On 17 April 1942, 99 Serbs were burned alive in the village of Kolarić, near Vojnić. A total of 3,849 inhabitants of the town of Vojnić were massacred during the war, out of a total of approximately 5000 inhabitants. That same month, a total of 759 women, children and elderly Serbs were massacred near the village of Krstinja. On 31 July 1942, in the Sadilovac church the Ustaše under Milan Mesić's command massacred more than 580 inhabitants of the surrounding villages, including about 270 children. At various dates, 2,019 primarily women and children were killed in the village of Rakovica.

==== Glina ====
On 11 or 12 May 1941, 260–300 Serbs were herded into an Orthodox church and shot, after which it was set on fire. The idea for this massacre reportedly came from Mirko Puk, who was the Minister of Justice for the NDH. On 10 May, Ivica Šarić, a specialist for such operations traveled to the town of Glina to meet with local Ustaše leadership where they drew up a list of names of all the Serbs between sixteen and sixty years of age to be arrested. After much discussion, they decided that all of the arrested should be killed. Many of the town's Serbs heard rumors that something bad was in store for them but the vast majority did not flee. On the night of 11 May, mass arrests of male Serbs over the age of sixteen began. The Ustaše then herded the group into an Orthodox Church and demanded that they be given documents proving the Serbs had all converted to Catholicism. Serbs who did not possess conversion certificates were locked inside and massacred. The church was then set on fire, leaving the bodies to burn as Ustaše stood outside to shoot any survivors attempting to escape the flames.

A similar massacre of Serbs occurred on 30 July 1941. 700 Serbs were gathered into a church under the premise that they would be converted. Victims were killed by having their throats cut or by having their heads smashed in with rifle butts. Between 500 and 2000 other Serbs were later massacred in neighbouring villages by Vjekoslav "Maks" Luburić's forces, continuing until 3 August. In these massacres specifically males 16 years and older were killed. Only one of the victims, Ljubo Jednak, survived by playing dead.

==== Lika ====
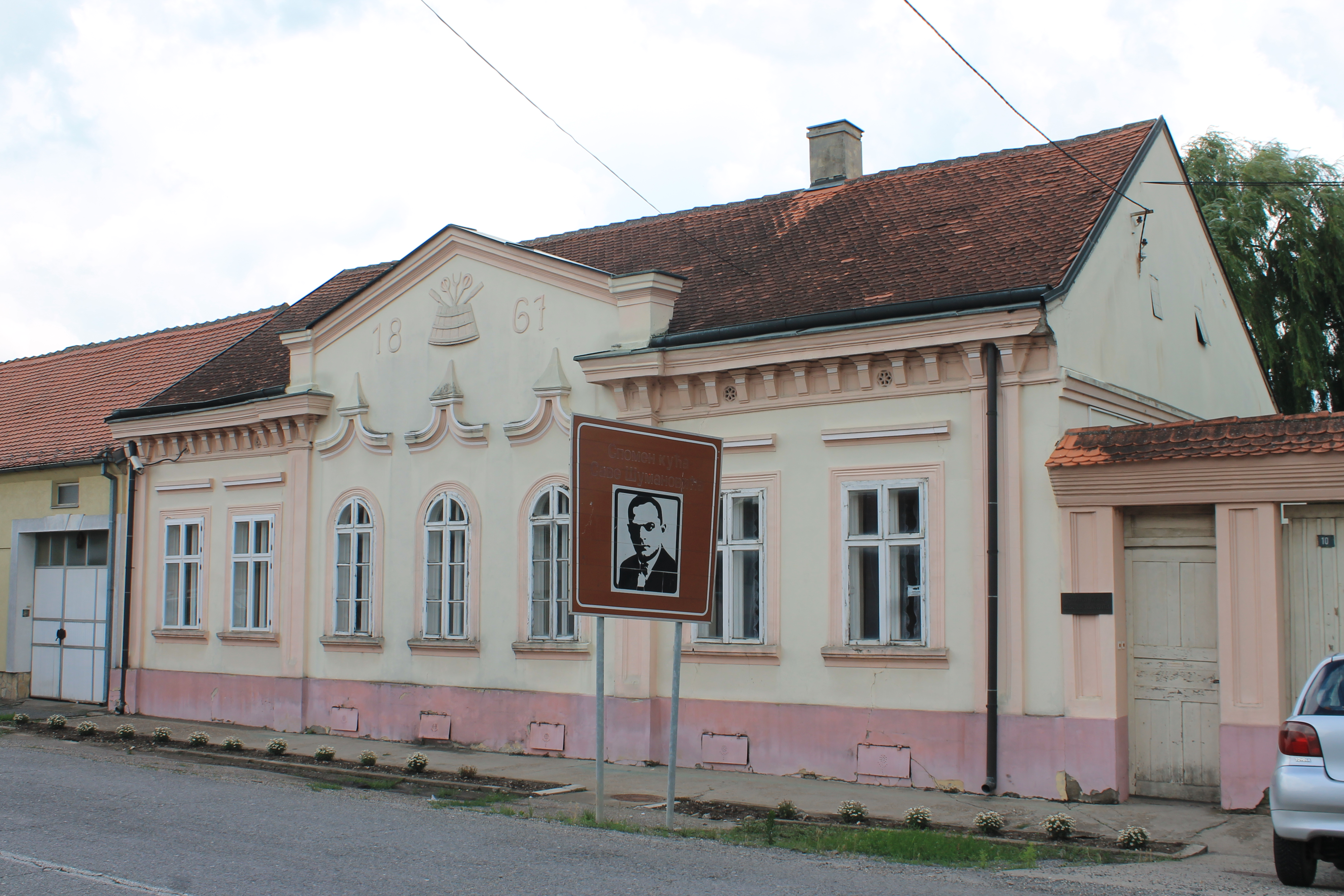
House of artist Sava Šumanović, locaded Šid, Syrmia. Šumanović was tortured and killed together with 150 other people

The district of Gospić experienced the first large-scale massacres which occurred in the Lika region, as some 3,000 Serb civilians were killed between late July and early August 1941. Ustaše officials reported an emerging Serb rebellion due to massacres. In late July 1941, a detachment of the Croatian military in Gospić noted that the local insurgents were Serb peasants who had fled to the woods "purely as a reaction to the cleansing [operations] against them by our Ustaša formations". Following a sabotage of railway tracks in the district of Vojnić that was attributed to local communists on 27 July 1941, the Ustaše began a "cleansing" operation of indiscriminate pillage and killing of civilians, including the elderly and children.

On 6 August 1941, the Ustaše killed and burned more than 280 villagers in Mlakva, including 191 children. Between June and August 1941, about 890 Serbs from Ličko Petrovo Selo and Melinovac were killed and thrown in the so-called Delić pit.

During the war, the Ustaše massacred more than 900 Serbs in Divoselo, more than 500 in Smiljan, as well as more than 400 in Široka Kula near Gospić. On 2 August 1941, the Ustaše trapped about 120 children and women and 50 men who tried to escape from Divoselo. After a few days of imprisonment, where women were raped, they were stabbed in groups and thrown into the pits.

=== Slavonia ===
On 21 December 1941, approximately 880 Serbs from Dugo Selo Lasinjsko and Prkos Lasinjski were killed in the Brezje forest. On the Serbian New Year, 14 January 1942, the biggest slaughter of the civilians from Slavonia started. Villages were burned, and about 350 people were deported to Voćin and executed.

=== Syrmia ===
In August 1942, following the joint military anti-partisan operation in the Syrmia by the Ustaše and German Wehrmacht, it turned into a massacre by the Ustaše militia that left up to 7,000 Serbs dead. Among those killed was the prominent painter Sava Šumanović, who was arrested along with 150 residents of Šid, and then tortured by having his arms cut off.

=== Bosnian Krajina ===
In August 1941 on the Eastern Orthodox Elijah's holy day, who is the patron saint of Bosnia and Herzegovina, between 2,800 and 5,500 Serbs from Sanski Most and the surrounding area were killed and thrown into pits which had been dug by victims themselves.

During the war, the NDH armed forces killed over 7,000 Serbs in the municipality of Kozarska Dubica, while the municipality lost more than half of its pre-war population. The biggest massacre was committed by the Croatian Home Guard in January 1942, when the village Draksenić was burned and more than 200 were people killed.

In February 1942, the Ustaše under Miroslav Filipović's command massacred 2,300 adults and 550 children in Serb-populated villages Drakulić, Motike and Šargovac. The children were chosen as the first victims and their body parts were cut off.

==== Garavice ====
From July to September 1941, thousands of Serbs were massacred along with some Jews and Roma victims at Garavice, an extermination location near Bihać. On the night of 17 June 1941, Ustaše began the mass killing of previously captured Serbs, who were brought by trucks from the surrounding towns to Garavice. The bodies of the victims were thrown into mass graves. A large amount of blood contaminated the local water supply.

=== Herzegovina ===
On 9 May 1941, approximately 400 Serbs were rounded up from several villages and executed in a pit behind a school in the village of Blagaj. On 31 May, between 120 and 270 Serbs were rounded up near Trebinje and executed.

On 2 June 1941, Ustaše authorities led by Herman Tongl in the municipality of Gacko issued an order to the Serb inhabitants of the villages of Korita and Zagradci demanding that all males above the age of fifteen report to a building in the village of Stepen. Once there, they were imprisoned for two days and on 4 June, the prisoners who numbered about 170 were tied together in groups of two or three, loaded onto a lorry and driven to the Golubnjača limestone pit near Kobilja Glava where they were shot, beaten with poles, cudgels, axes and picks and thrown into the pit. On June 22, under the ruse that Serbs were planning to launch an offensive prior to the Vidovdan holiday, Tongl enlisted locals to massacre Serb farmers in four districts. The victims included women who were raped as well as children; some were thrown into pits while others were taken near the Neretva river and executed there. On June 23, 80 people from three villages near Gacko were killed.

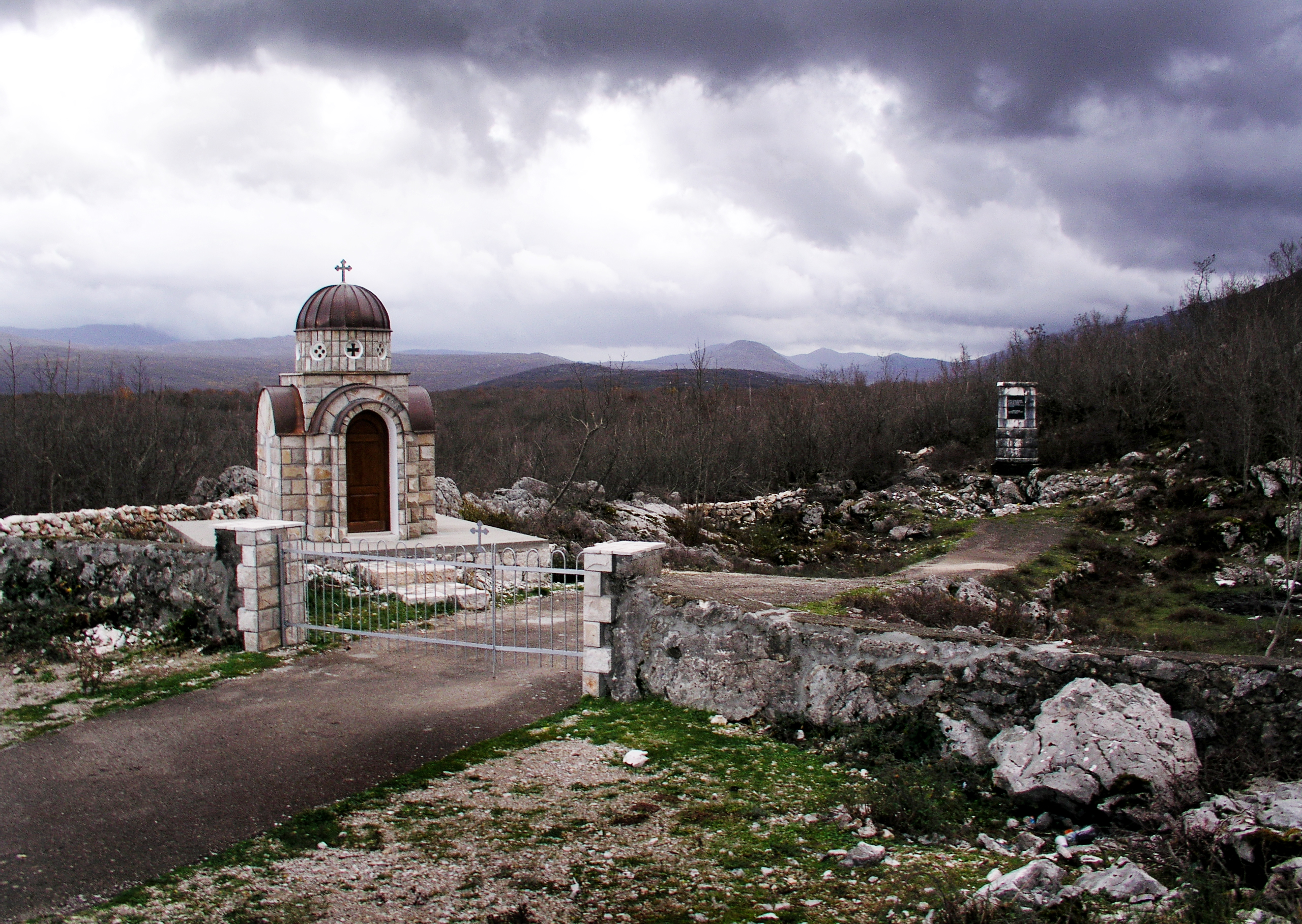
Pandurica pit near Ljubinje

On 2 June 1941, the Ustaše killed 140 peasants near the town of Ljubinje and on 23 June killed an additional 160. In the municipality of Stolac, nearly 260 were killed during the course of two days.

In the Livno Field area, the Ustaše killed over 1,200 Serbs including 370 children. In the Koprivnica Forest near Livno, around 300 citizen were tortured and killed. About 300 children, women and the elderly were killed and thrown into the Ravni Dolac pit in Donji Rujani.

From 4–6 August 1941, 650 women and children killed by being thrown into the Golubinka pit near Šurmanci. Also, hand grenades were thrown at dead bodies. Some 4000 Serbs were later massacred in neighbouring places during that summer.

=== Drina Valley ===
Some 70-200 Serbs massacred by Muslim Ustaše forces in Rašića Gaj, Vlasenica in Bosnia and Herzegovina between 22 June and 20 July 1941, after raping women and girls. Many Serbs were executed by Ustaše along the Drina Valley for a months, especially near Višegrad. Jure Francetić's Black Legion killed thousands of defenceless Bosnian Serb civilians and threw their bodies into the Drina river. In 1942, about 6,000 Serbs were killed in Stari Brod near Rogatica and Miloševići.

=== Sarajevo ===
During the summer of 1941, Ustaše militia periodically interned and executed groups of Sarajevo Serbs. In August 1941, they arrested about one hundred Serbs suspected of ties to the resistance armies, mostly church officials and members of the intelligentsia, and executed them or deported them to concentration camps. The Ustaše killed at least 323 people in the Villa Luburić, a slaughter house and place for torturing and imprisoning Serbs, Jews and political dissidents.

== Expulsion and ethnic cleansing ==
Expulsions was one of the pillar of the Ustaše plan to create a pure Croat state. The first to be forced to leave were war veterans from World War I Macedonian front who lived in Slavonia and Syrmia. By mid-1941, 5,000 Serbs had been expelled to German-occupied Serbia. The general plan was to have prominent people deported first, so their property could be nationalized and the remaining Serbs could then be more easily manipulated. By the end of September 1941, about half of the Serbian Orthodox clergy, 335 priests, had been expelled.

The Drina is the border between the East and West. God's Providence placed us to defend our border, which our allies are well aware and value, because for centuries we have proven that we are good frontiersmen.

— Mile Budak, the minister of the NDH government, August 1941.

Advocates of expulsion presented it as a necessary measure for the creation of a socially functional nation state, and also rationalized these plans by comparing it with the 1923 population exchange between Greece and Turkey. The Ustaše set up holding camps, with the aim of gathering a large number of people and deporting them. The NDH government also formed the Office of Colonization to resettle Croats on reclaimed land. During the summer of 1941, the expulsions were carried out with the significant participation of the local population. Many representatives of local elites, including Bosnian Muslims in Bosnia and Herzegovina and Germans in Slavonia and Syrmia, played an active role in the expulsion.

An estimated 120,000 Serbs were deported from the NDH to German-occupied Serbia, and 300,000 fled by 1943. By the end of July 1941 according to the German authorities in Serbia, 180,000 Serbs defected from the NDH to Serbia and by the end of September that number exceeded 200,000. In that same period 14,733 persons were legally relocated from the NDH to Serbia. In turn, the NDH had to accept more than 200,000 Slovenian refugees who were forcefully evicted from their homes as part of the German plan of annexing parts of the Slovenian territories. In October 1941, organized migration was stopped because the German authorities in Serbia forbid further immigration of Serbs. According to documentation of the Commissariat for Refugees and Immigrants in Belgrade, in 1942 and 1943 illegal departures of individuals from NDH to Serbia still existed, numbering an estimated 200,000 though these figures are incomplete.

== Religious persecution ==
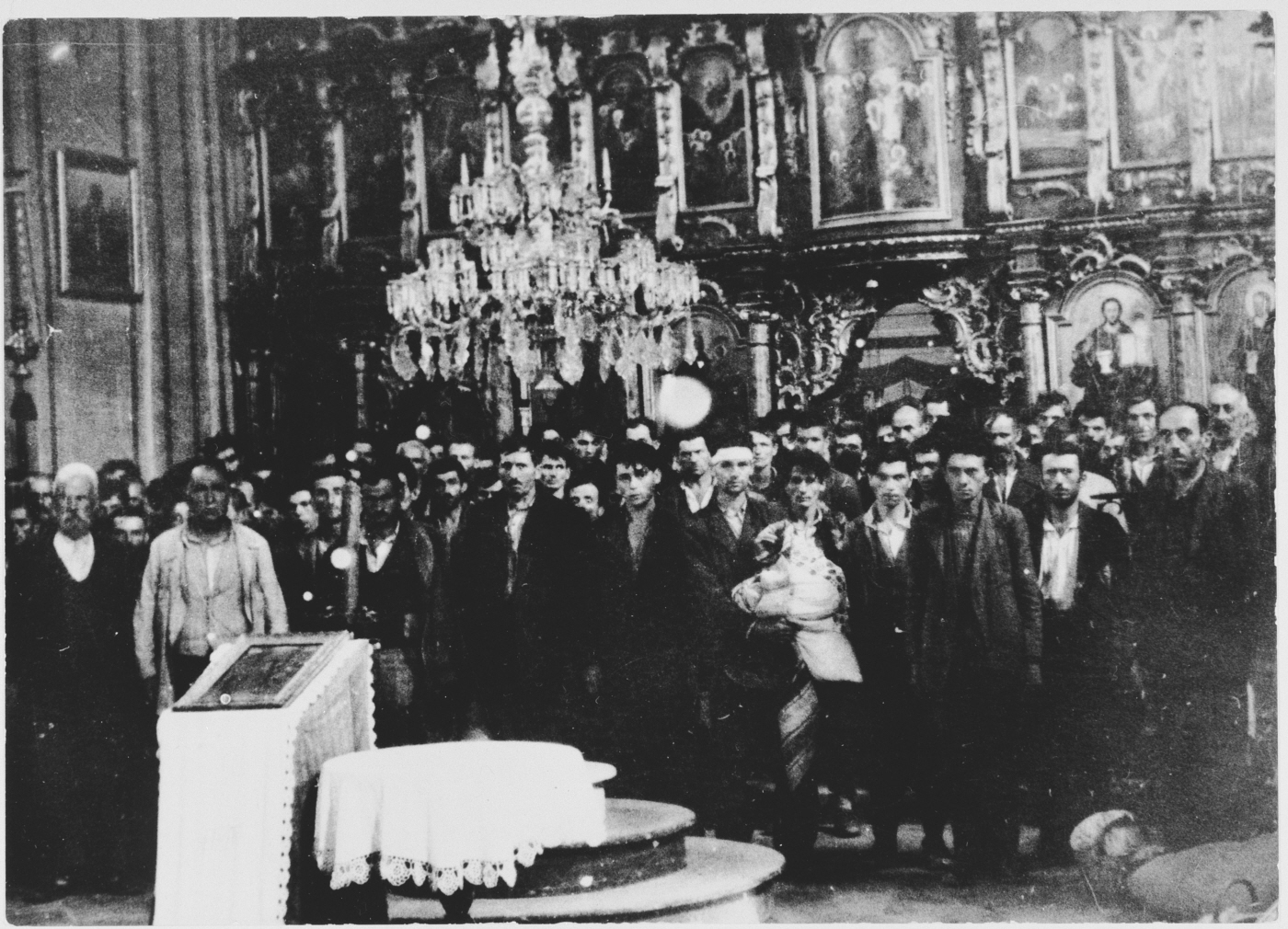
Group of Serb civilians forcibly converted at a church in Glina

The Ustaše viewed religion and nationality as being closely linked; while Roman Catholicism and Islam (Bosnian Muslims were viewed as Croats) were recognized as Croatian national religions, Eastern Orthodoxy was deemed inherently incompatible with the Croatian state project. They saw Orthodoxy as hostile because it was identified as Serb (prior to 1920, the Orthodox dioceses in most of Croatian lands belonged to an independent Patriarchate of Karlovci). To a certain extent, the campaign of terror could be seen as similar Crusades of medieval ages; a religious crusade. On 3 May 1941, a law was passed on religious conversions, pressuring Serbs to convert to Catholicism and thereby adopt Croat identity. This was made on the eve of Pavelić's meeting with Pope Pius XII in Rome. The Catholic Church in Croatia, headed by archbishop Aloysius Stepinac, greeted it and adopted it into the Church's internal law. The term "Serbian Orthodox" was banned in mid-May as being incompatible with state order, and the term "Greek-Eastern faith" was used in its place. By the end of September 1941, about half of the Serbian Orthodox clergy, 335 priests, had been expelled.

To erase all history of Serbs and the Orthodox religion, churches (some of which dated to 1200s and 1300s) were razed to the ground or denigrated by using them as stables or barns etc.

The Ustaša movement is based on religion. Therefore, our acts stem from our devotion to religion and the Roman Catholic church.

— the chief Ustaše ideologist Mile Budak, 13 July 1941.

Ustaše propaganda legitimized the persecution as being partially based on the historic Catholic–Orthodox struggle for domination in Europe and Catholic intolerance towards the "schismatics". Following the start of Serb insurgency (July 1941), the State Directorate for Regeneration in the autumn of 1941 launched a program aimed at the mass forced conversion of the Serbs. Already in the summer, the Ustaše had closed or destroyed most of the Serbian Orthodox churches and monasteries and deported, imprisoned or murdered Orthodox priests and bishops. Over 150 Serbian Orthodox priests were also killed between May and December 1941. The conversions were meant to Croatianize and permanently destroy the Serbian Orthodox Church. Roman Catholic priest Krunoslav Draganović argued that many Catholics were converted to Orthodoxy during the 16th and 17th centuries, which was later used as the basis for the Ustaše conversion program.

The conversion policy had a particular aspect: only uneducated Serbs were eligible for conversion, since illiterate peasants were presumed to have less of a Serb/Orthodox identity. People with secondary education etc. (and especially Orthodox clergy) were not eligible. Educated people were singled out for expulsion or extermination, states Robert B. McCormick.

The Vatican was not opposed to the forced conversions. On 6 February 1942, Pope Pius XII privately received 206 Ustaše members in uniforms and blessed them, symbolically supporting their actions. On 8 February 1942, the envoy to the Holy See, Nikola Rušinović, said that 'the Holy See rejoiced' at forced conversions. In a 21 February 1942 letter to Cardinal Luigi Maglione, the Holy See's secretary encouraged the Croatian bishops to speed up the conversions, and he also stated that the term "Orthodox" should be replaced with the terms "apostates or schismatics". Many fanatical Catholic priests joined the Ustaše, blessed and supported their work, and participated in killings and conversions.

In 1941–1942, some 200,000 or 240,000–250,000 Serbs were converted to Roman Catholicism, although most of them only practiced it temporarily. Converts would sometimes be killed anyway, often in the same churches where they were re-baptized. 85% of the Serbian Orthodox clergy was killed or expelled. In Lika, Kordun and Banija alone, 172 Serbian Orthodox churches were closed, destroyed, or plundered.

The Encyclopedia of the Holocaust described that the bishops' conference that met in Zagreb in November 1941 was not prepared to denounce the forced conversion of Serbs that had taken place in the summer of 1941, let alone condemn the persecution and murder of Serbs and Jews. Many Catholic priests in Croatia approved of and supported the Ustaše's large scale attacks on the Serbian Orthodox Church, and the Catholic hierarchy did not issue any condemnation of the crimes, either publicly or privately. The Croatian Catholic Church and the Vatican viewed the Ustaše's policies against the Serbs as being advantageous to Roman Catholicism.

=== Conversion to Greek Catholicism ===
Alongside the Catholic Church and Islam, another religious community was officially recognised by the NDH government, namely the Greek Catholic Church. Established in Croatia in the 17th century and full communion with Rome, this Church originated from Orthodox Serbs embracing Uniatism, which allowed them to preserve the Byzantine Rite while adopting some aspects of the Catholic doctrine. Over time, the identity of the converts shifted from Serbian to Croatian. Although in the early days of the NDH, this religious community received the same financial support as the Catholic Church, in particular for the upkeep of its religious structures, the Ustaše authorities nevertheless had a somewhat hostile view of Greek Catholic proselytism. However, this changed abruptly after a mass uprising of Serbs in reaction to their persecution, which led the NDH to authorise their conversion to Greek Catholicism. From the end of 1941 onwards, Greek Catholics were allowed to take over Orthodox churches and create new parishes, the right to convert Orthodox Serbs to Uniatism being granted by Pope Pius XII himself. As a result, although Uniate converts and clergy were occasionally persecuted by Ustaše commanders, the Greek Catholic Church of Croatia benefited from the repression of Serbs at least as much as the Catholic Church and supported the NDH regime in the same way.

=== The puppet "Croatian Orthodox Church" ===
After the matter of forced conversion had become extremely controversial, the NDH government on 3 April 1942 adopted a law that established the Croatian Eastern Orthodox Church. This was done in order to replace the institutions of the Serbian Orthodox Church. According to the "Statute concerning the Croatian Eastern Orthodox Church" that was approved on 5 June, the Church was "indivisible in its unity and autocephalous". In June, White Russian émigré Germogen Maximov, an archbishop of the Russian Orthodox Church Outside Russia, was enthroned as its primate. The establishment of the Church was done in order to try and pacify the state as well as to Croatisize the remaining Serb population once the Ustaše realized that the complete eradication of Serbs in the NDH was unattainable. Persecution of Serbs continued however, but was less intense.

=== Persecution of Serbian Orthodox clergy ===
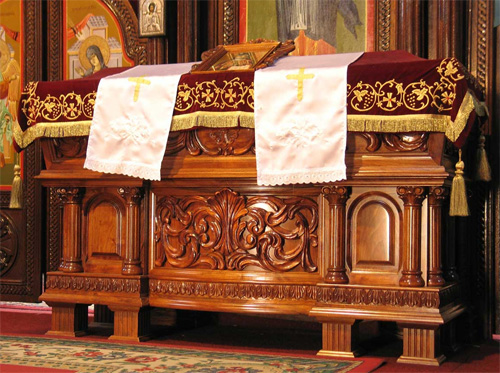
Platon Jovanović's relics in the Church of the Holy Trinity, Banja Luka

Bishops of the Serbian Orthodox Church dioceses in the Independent State of Croatia were targeted during religious persecutions. On 5 May 1941, the Ustaše tortured and killed Platon Jovanović of Banja Luka. On 12 May, Bishop Petar Zimonjić, Metropolitan of the Eparchy of Dabar-Bosna, was killed and in mid-August Bishop Sava Trlajić was killed. Dositej Vasić, the Metropolitan of the Metropolitanate of Zagreb and Ljubljana died in 1945 as result of wounds from torture by Ustaše. Nikola Jovanović, the Bishop of the Eparchy of Zahumlje and Herzegovina died in 1944, after he was beaten by the Ustaše and expelled to Serbia. Irinej Đorđević, the Bishop of the Eparchy of Dalmatia was interned to Italian captivity. There were 577 Serbian Orthodox priests, monks and other religious dignitaries in the NDH in April 1941. By December, there were none left. Between 214 and 217 were killed, 334 were exiled, eighteen fled and five died of natural causes. In Bosnia and Herzegovina, 71 Orthodox priests were killed by the Ustaše during WWII, 10 by the Partisans, 5 by the Germans, and 45 died in the first decade after the end of WWII.

According to Serb Orthodox Church data, out of approximately 700 clergymen and monks of the NDH territory, 577 were subjected to persecution, out of these 217 were killed, 334 were deported to Serbia, 3 were arrested, 18 managed to escape and 5 died (later) from consequences of torture.

=== The role of Aloysius Stepinac ===
A cardinal Aloysius Stepinac served as Archbishop of Zagreb during World War II and pledged his loyalty to the NDH. Scholars still debate the degree of Stepinac's contact with the Ustaše regime. Mark Biondich stated that he was not an "ardent supporter" of the Ustahsa regime legitimising their every policy, nor an "avowed opponent" publicly denounced its crimes in a systematic manner. While some clergy committed war crimes in the name of the Catholic Church, Stepinac practiced a wary ambivalence. He was an early supporter of the goal of creating a Catholic Croatia, but soon began to question the regime's mandate of forced conversion.

Historian Tomasevich praised his statements that were made against the Ustaše regime by Stepinac, as well as his actions against the regime. However, he also noted that these same statements and actions had shortcomings in respect to Ustaše's genocidal actions against the Serbs and the Serbian Orthodox Church. As Stepinac failed to publicly condemn the genocide waged against the Serbs by the Ustaše earlier during the war as he would later on. Tomasevich stated that Stepinac's courage against the Ustaše state earned him great admiration among anti-Ustaše Croats in his flock along with many others. However this came with the price of enmity of the Ustaše and Pavelić personally. In the early part of the war, he strongly supported a Yugoslavian state organized with federal lines. It was generally known that Stepinac and Pavelić thoroughly hated each other. The Germans considered him Pro-Western and "friend of the Jews" leading to hostility from German and Italian forces.

On 14 May 1941, Stepinac received word of an Ustaše massacre of Serb villagers at Glina. On the same day, he wrote to Pavelić saying:

I consider it my bishop's responsibility to raise my voice and to say that this is not permitted according to Catholic teaching, which is why I ask that you undertake the most urgent measures on the entire territory of the Independent State of Croatia, so that not a single Serb is killed unless it is shown that he committed a crime warranting death. Otherwise, we will not be able to count on the blessing of heaven, without which we must perish.

These were still private protest letters. Later in 1942 and 1943, Stepinac started to speak out more openly against the Ustaše genocides, this was after most of the genocides were already committed, and it became increasingly clear the Nazis and Ustaše will be defeated. In May 1942, Stepinac spoke out against genocide, mentioning Jews and Roma, but not Serbs.

Tomasevich wrote that while Stepinac is to be commended for his actions against the regime, the failure of the Croatian Catholic hierarchy and Vatican to publicly condemn the genocide "cannot be defended from the standpoint of humanity, justice and common decency". In his diary, Stepinac said that "Serbs and Croats are of two different worlds, north and south pole, which will never unite as long as one of them is alive", along with other similar views. Historian Ivo Goldstein described that Stepinac was being sympathetic to the Ustaše authorities and ambivalent towards the new racial laws, as well as that he was "a man with many dilemmas in a disturbing time". Stepinac resented the interwar conversion of some 200,000 mostly Croatian Catholics to Orthodoxy, which he felt was forced on them by prevailing political conditions. In 2016 Croatia's rehabilitation of Stepinac was negatively received in Serbia and Republika Srpska, an entity of Bosnia and Herzegovina.

== International reactions ==
From the onset of the genocide, German diplomats kept detailed accounts of atrocities and by 1942, begun to raise concerns amongst Axis officials including Alexander Löhr and Benito Mussolini. In September 1942, Löhr met with Hitler to order Pavelić to stop attacks on the Serbs as he believed the anti-Serb policies of the NDH had driven most of the NDH's Serb population into supporting the Partisans. Hitler laughingly dismissed Löhr's concerns, saying that the Ustaše was just "letting off a little steam" by trying to kill all of the Serbs living in the NDH, and ignored requests to discuss the issue at his meeting with Pavelić.

In his last telegram to the United States following the invasion of Yugoslavia, the United States ambassador to the Kingdom of Yugoslavia, Arthur Bliss Lane reported that both Jews and Serbs were being persecuted in Zagreb. In June 1941, a Standard Oil company employee who had recently left Zagreb provided evidence of persecutions conducted by the NDH against Jews and Serbs to the United States delegation in Geneva. However, both the telegram and evidence submitted in Geneva did not mention deaths or executions. In August 1941, a former United States diplomat to Yugoslavia received a letter, accompanied by pictures which described of "a comprehensive policy aiming at the extermination of the Serbian race." The letter, which described killings of an "animal-like fashion" and the establishment of concentration camps was submitted to both the State Department and the Yugoslav government-in-exile ambassador to the United States, Constantin Fotich who subsequently provided a memorandum of the killings to Franklin D. Roosevelt on 20 December 1941. By the beginning of 1942, secretary of state Cordell Hull was receiving daily updates from the United States consul-general Sam Honaker in Istanbul of both Jews and Serbs being killed in the NDH. Concurrently, United States diplomat Anthony Joseph Drexel Biddle Jr. was being provided reports by General Draža Mihailović of ongoing killings and expulsion of Serbs, albeit using exaggerated figures. When the exiled Peter II of Yugoslavia visited Roosevelt in the summer of 1942, he provided further accounts of atrocities committed against the Serbs in the NDH to Roosevelt and requested a public statement by Roosevelt on the atrocities being committed.

Despite the numerous reports of atrocities being committed against the Serbs, only once did the State Department inquire about the NDH policies towards the Serbs. On 29 September 1941, Hull asked the American embassy in Rome to investigate reports of "mass deportation of Serbs from Croatia" to which, none was received. Despite Roosevelt assuring exiled King Peter II of Yugoslavia that the Ustaše would have to "pay for their crimes at the end of the war", the White House made no public statements or took action in relation to the genocide of the Serbs in the NDH. Dissension between Serb and Croatian members of the Yugoslav government-in-exile only hampered ongoing efforts to raise awareness of the ongoing genocide.

== Toll of victims ==
The United States Holocaust Memorial Museum website states that "Determining the number of victims for Yugoslavia, for Croatia, and for Jasenovac is highly problematic, due to the destruction of many relevant documents, the long-term inaccessibility to independent scholars of those documents that survived, and the ideological agendas of postwar partisan scholarship and journalism".

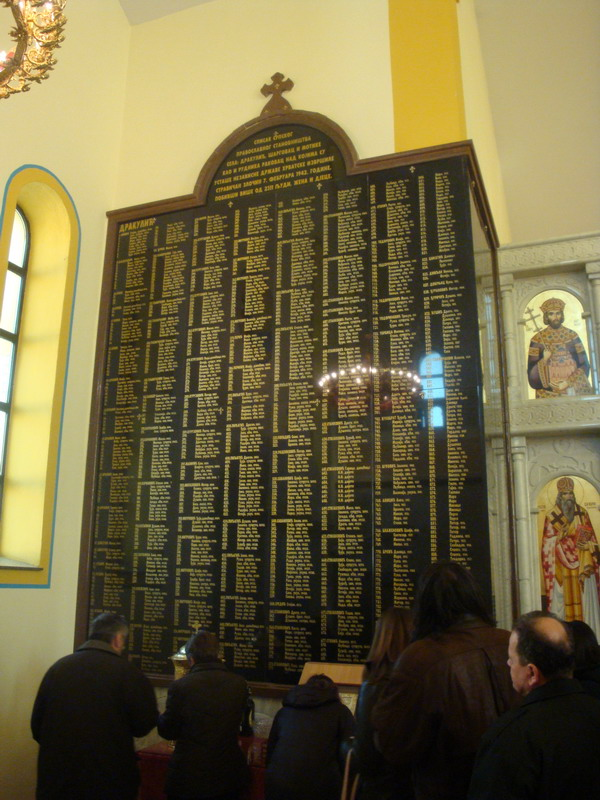
Memorial plaque in Drakulić to the victims of massacres around Banja Luka

In the 1980s, calculations of World War II victims in Yugoslavia were made by the Serb statistician Bogoljub Kočović and the Croat demographer Vladimir Žerjavić. Tomasevich described their studies as being objective and reliable. Kočović estimated that 370,000 Serbs, both combatants and civilians, died in the NDH during the war. With a possible error of around 10%, he noted that Serb losses cannot be higher than 410,000. He did not estimate the number of Serbs who were killed by the Ustaše, saying that in most cases, the task of categorizing the victims would be impossible. Žerjavić estimated that the total number of Serb deaths in the NDH was 322,000, of which 125,000 died as combatants, while 197,000 were civilians. Žerjavić estimated that a total of 78,000 civilians were killed in Ustaše prisons, pits and camps, including Jasenovac, 45,000 civilians were killed by the Germans, 15,000 civilians were killed by the Italians, 34,000 civilians were killed in battles between the warring parties, and 25,000 civilians died of typhoid. The number of victims who perished in the Jasenovac concentration camp remains a matter of debate, but current estimates put the total number at around 100,000, about half of whom were Serbs.

During the war as well as during Tito's Yugoslavia, various numbers were given for Yugoslavia's overall war casualties. Estimates by Holocaust memorial centers also vary. The historian Jozo Tomasevich said that the exact number of victims in Yugoslavia is impossible to determine. The academic Barbara Jelavich however cites Tomasevich's estimate in writing that as many as 350,000 Serbs were killed during the period of Ustaše rule. The historian Rory Yeomans said that the most conservative estimates state that 200,000 Serbs were killed by Ustaše death squads but the actual number of Serbs who were executed by the Ustaše or perished in Ustaše concentration camps may be as high as 500,000. In a 1992 work, Sabrina P. Ramet cites the figure of 350,000 Serbs who were "liquidated" by "Pavelić and his Ustaše henchmen". In a 2006 work, Ramet estimated that at least 300,000 Serbs were "massacred by the Ustaše". In her 2007 book "The Independent State of Croatia 1941-45", Ramet cites Žerjavić's overall figures for Serb losses in the NDH. Marko Attila Hoare writes that "perhaps nearly 300,000 Serbs" died as a result of the Ustaše genocide and the Nazi policies.

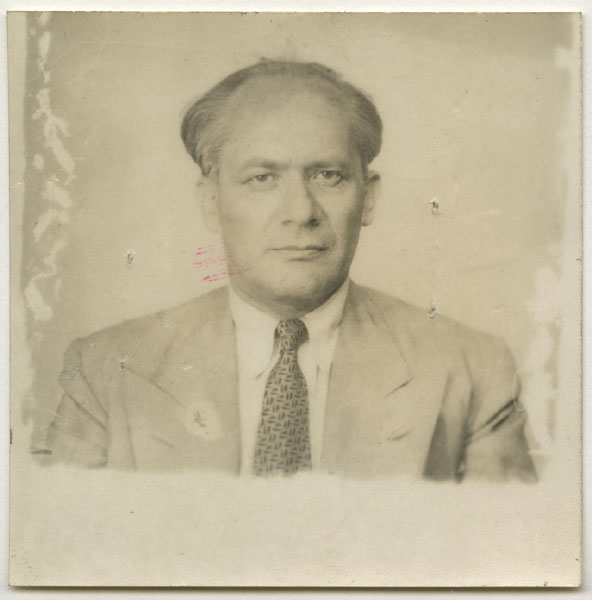
Raphael Lemkin, the initiator of the Genocide Convention described the Ustaše crimes against Serbs as genocide

Tomislav Dulić stated that Serbs in NDH suffered among the highest casualty rates in Europe during the World War II. American historian Stanley G. Payne stated that direct and indirect executions by NDH regime were an "extraordinary mass crime", which in proportionate terms exceeded any other European regime beside Hitler's Third Reich. He added the crimes in the NDH were proportionately surpassed only by the Khmer Rouge in Cambodia and several of the extremely genocidal African regimes. Raphael Israeli wrote that "a large scale genocidal operations, in proportions to its small population, remain almost unique in the annals of wartime Europe."

== Aftermath ==
=== Genocide classification ===
In Serbia as well as in the eyes of Serbs, the Ustaše atrocities constituted a genocide. Many historians and authors describe the Ustaše regime's mass killings of Serbs as meeting the definition of genocide, including Raphael Lemkin who is known for coining the word genocide and initiating the Genocide Convention. In 2018, Croatian historian Mirjana Kasapović wrote that in the most important scientific works on genocide, crimes against Serbs, Jews and Roma in the NDH are unequivocally classified as genocide.

Yad Vashem, Israel's official memorial to the victims of the Holocaust, stated that the Ustasha carried out a Serb genocide. The Simon Wiesenthal Center, also, mentioned that leaders of the Independent State of Croatia committed genocide against Serbs, Jews, and Roma.

In the 2000s and 2010s, Presidents of Croatia, Stjepan Mesić and Ivo Josipović, as well as Bakir Izetbegović and Željko Komšić, Bosniak and Croat member of the Presidency of Bosnia and Herzegovina, also described the persecution of Serbs in the Independent State of Croatia as a genocide.

In the post-war era, the Serbian Orthodox Church considered the Serbian victims of this genocide to be martyrs. As a result, the Serbian Orthodox Church commemorates the Holy Martyrs of Jasenovac on 13 September.

In 2025, the Croatian fact-checking outlet Crofacta, run by the Miroslav Krleža Institute of Lexicography, published an article by lexicographer Filip Hameršak and the current director of the Institute, discussing whether the persecution of Serbs in the Independent State of Croatia constitutes genocide. According to the article, the classification of crimes against Serbs in the Independent State of Croatia as genocide remains debated among historians due to differing interpretations of genocidal intent and definitions. The article states that while many scholars describe the policies of the Ustaše as genocidal, others argue the evidence does not conclusively demonstrate a centrally planned policy of total extermination, meaning there's a possible distinction between a complete and a partial designation of genocide.

=== Yugoslav policy ===
The Yugoslav communist authorities did not use the Jasenovac camp as was done with other European concentration camps, most likely due to Serb-Croat relations. They recognized that ethnic tensions stemming from the war could have had the capacity to destabilize the new communist regime, and subsequently tried to conceal wartime atrocities and mask specific ethnic losses. The Tito's government attempted to let the wounds heal and forge "brotherhood and unity" in the peoples. Tito himself was invited to, and passed Jasenovac several times, but never visited the site. The genocide was not properly examined in the aftermath of the war, because the Yugoslav communist government did not encourage independent scholars. Historians Marko Attila Hoare and Mark Biondich stated that Western world historians don't pay enough attention to the genocide committed by Ustaše, while several scholars described it as lesser-known genocide.

Post-war Yugoslav authorities practiced a culture of memory of past atrocities and traumas that ended up downplaying the genocidal crimes of the Ustaše, which in turn led to a backlash of manipulations of Serbian nationalists during the breakup of Yugoslavia, in turn reciprocated by Croatian nationalist denialism. World War II and especially its ethnic conflicts have been deemed instrumental in the later Yugoslav Wars (1991–95).

=== Trials ===
Mile Budak and a number of other members of the NDH government, such as Nikola Mandić and Julije Makanec, were tried and convicted of high treason and war crimes by the communist authorities of the SFR Yugoslavia. Many of them were executed. Miroslav Filipović, the commandant of the Jasenovac and Stara Gradiška camps, was found guilty for war crimes, sentenced to death and hanged.

Many others escaped, including the supreme leader Ante Pavelić, most to Latin America. Some emigrations were prevented by the Operation Gvardijan, in which Ljubo Miloš, the commandant of the Jasenovac camp was captured and executed. Aloysius Stepinac, who served as Archbishop of Zagreb was found guilty of high treason and forced conversion of Orthodox Serbs to Catholicism. However, some claim the trial was "carried out with proper legal procedure".

In its judgment in the Hostages Trial, the Nuremberg Military Tribunal concluded that the Independent State of Croatia was not a sovereign entity capable of acting independently of the German military, despite recognition as an independent state by the Axis powers. According to the Tribunal, "Croatia was at all times here involved an occupied country". The Nuremberg Tribunal did describe the regime as genocidal. The Convention on the Prevention and Punishment of the Crime of Genocide were not in force at the time. It was unanimously adopted by the United Nations General Assembly on 9 December 1948 and entered into force on 12 January 1951. If that convention were to be applied to the actions of the Ustaša regime, they did commit genocide under every category of Article 2 except one.

Andrija Artuković, Minister of Internal Affairs and Minister of Justice of the NDH who signed a number of racial laws, escaped to the United States after the war and he was extradited to Yugoslavia in 1986, where he was tried in the Zagreb District Court and was found guilty of a number of mass killings in the NDH. Artuković was sentenced to death, but the sentence was not carried out due to his age and health. Efraim Zuroff, a Nazi hunter, played a significant role in capturing Dinko Šakić, another Jasenovac camp commander, during 1990s. After pressure from the international community on the right-wing president Franjo Tuđman, he sought Šakić's extradition and he stood trial in Croatia, aged 78; he was found guilty of war crimes and crimes against humanity and given the maximum sentence of 20 years imprisonment. According to the human rights researchers Eric Stover, Victor Peskin and Alexa Koenig it was "the most important post-Cold War domestic effort to hold criminally accountable a Nazi war crimes suspect in a former Eastern European communist country".

=== Ratlines, terrorism and assassinations ===
With the Partisan liberation of Yugoslavia, many Ustaše leaders fled and took refuge at the college of San Girolamo degli Illirici near the Vatican. Catholic priest and Ustaše Krunoslav Draganović directed the fugitives from San Girolamo. The US State Department and Counter-Intelligence Corps helped war criminals to escape, and assisted Draganović (who later worked for the American intelligence) in sending Ustaše abroad. Many of those responsible for mass killings in NDH took refuge in South America, Portugal, Spain and the United States. Luburić was assassinated in Spain in 1969 by an UDBA agent; Artuković lived in Ireland and California until extradited in 1986 and died of natural causes in prison; Dinko Šakić and his wife Nada lived in Argentina until extradited in 1998, Dinko dying in prison and his wife released. Draganović also arranged Gestapo functionary Klaus Barbie's flight.

Among some of the Croat diaspora, the Ustaše became heroes. Ustaše émigré terrorist groups in the diaspora (such as Croatian Revolutionary Brotherhood and Croatian National Resistance) carried out assassinations and bombings, and also plane hijackings, throughout the Yugoslav period.

== Controversy and denial ==
=== Historical negationism ===
Some Croats, including politicians, have attempted to minimise the magnitude of the genocide perpetrated against Serbs in the Independent State of Croatia. Historian Mirjana Kasapović concluded that there are three main strategies of historical revisionism in the part of Croatian historiography: the NDH was a normal counter-insurgency state at the time; no mass crimes were committed in the NDH, especially genocide; the Jasenovac camp was just a labor camp, not an extermination camp.

By 1989, the future President of Croatia, Franjo Tuđman had embraced Croatian nationalism and published Horrors of War: Historical Reality and Philosophy, in which he questioned the official number of victims killed by the Ustaše during the Second World War. In his book, Tuđman claimed that between 30,000 and 40,000 died at Jasenovac. Some scholars and observers accused Tuđman of racist statements, "flirting with ideas associated with the Ustaše movement", appointment of former Ustaše officials to political and military positions, as well as downplaying the number of victims in the Independent State of Croatia.

Since 2016, anti-fascist groups, leaders of Croatia's Serb, Roma and Jewish communities and former top Croat officials have boycotted the official state commemoration for the victims of the Jasenovac concentration camp because, as they said, Croatian authorities refused to denounce the Ustaše legacy explicitly and they downplayed and revitalized crimes committed by Ustaše.

In July 2024, Croatian weekly Nacional wrote that Ivo Pejaković, former director of the Jasenovac Memorial Site, among other reasons, resigned amid political pressure linked to the Croatian government’s reluctance to formally acknowledge the Ustasha regime’s genocide against Serbs. Pejaković resigned after a factual correction had to be made to the Memorial Site's website following a correction by the Croatian historian Vladimir Geiger. This incident was then reportedly used to pressure Pejaković by the government overseer Matea Brstilo Rešetar, who had been appointed to that position by the one-time controversial minister Zlatko Hasanbegović. Historian Rory Yeomans reacted to Pejaković's resignation by publicly warning against downplaying the genocidal crimes of the Ustaša in Croatia regardless of manipulations of nationalists in Serbia and Montenegro.

In October 2025, a roundtable was organized in the Croatian Parliament by right-wing parties Croatian Sovereignists and DOMiNO, featuring speakers who questioned established facts about the Jasenovac concentration camp, including the number of victims and the nature of the camp. Participants presented claims minimizing or denying mass killings, which were criticized by political opponents and survivors as historical revisionism and misinformation. The Croatian Parliament (Sabor) subsequently removed from its official website and YouTube channel the video of the roundtable. In response, left-wing representatives Dalija Orešković and Anka Mrak Taritaš organized another roundtable named Ustaštvo nema ‘ali’” (“There’s no ‘but’ with Ustaše”) which featured experts such as historian Hrvoje Klasić and political scientist Dražen Lalić.

According to a 2026 report by Croatian weekly Nacional, a public call for the director of the Jasenovac Memorial Site failed to attract qualified candidates. The applicants included Igor Vukić, associated with historical revisionism, and this was interpreted as an attempt by far-right politicians to destroy the institution. The report states that several historians and representatives of victim communities attribute the lack of interest among qualified professionals to political and social pressures, including what they describe as the Croatian government’s reluctance to explicitly recognize the genocide of Serbs committed by the Ustaše regime in the Independent State of Croatia. Interviewed experts expressed concern that such conditions discourage scholars from applying for leadership positions and negatively affect the institution’s work. The article further reports that research and exhibition activities at the memorial site have been reduced, raising concerns about its long-term functioning.

=== Destruction of memorials ===
After Croatia gained independence, about 3,000 monuments dedicated to the anti-fascist resistance and the victims of fascism were destroyed. According to Croatian World War II veterans' association, these destructions were not spontaneous, but a planned activity carried out by the ruling party, the state and the church. The status of the Jasenovac Memorial Site was downgraded to the nature park, and parliament cut its funding. In September 1991, Croatian forces entered the memorial site and vandalized the museum building, while exhibitions and documentation were destroyed, damaged and looted. In 1992, FR Yugoslavia sent a formal protest to the United Nations and UNESCO, warning of the devastation of the memorial complex. The European Community Monitor Mission visited the memorial center and confirmed the damage.

== Commemoration ==
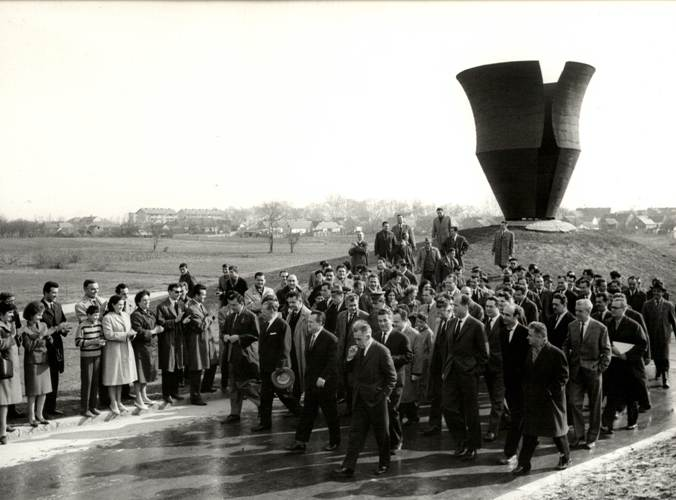
Josip Broz Tito visits the memorial park in Sremska Mitrovica, dedicated to the victims in Syrmia

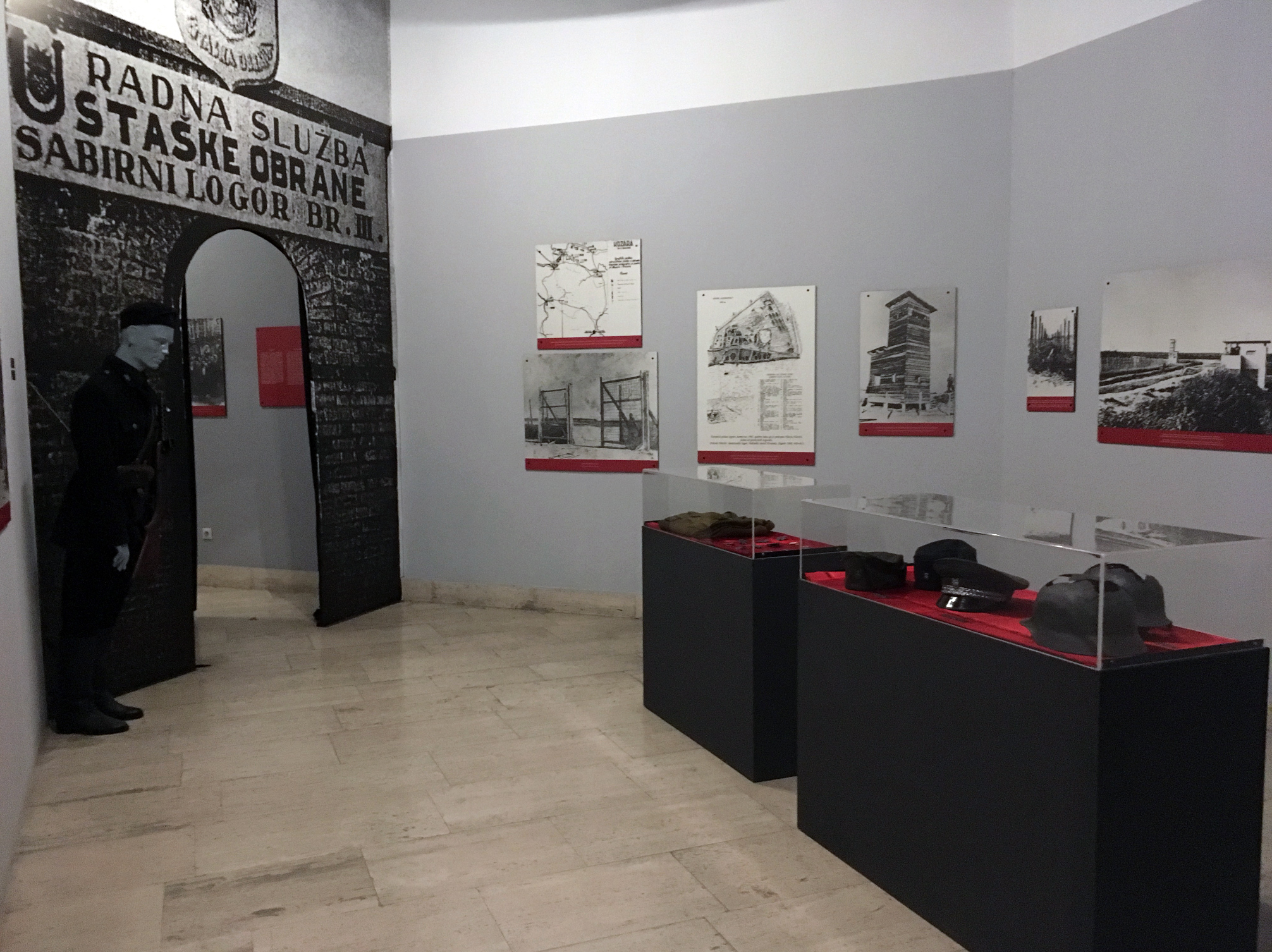
An exhibition dedicated to the Jasenovac victims, Banja Luka

Israeli President Moshe Katsav visited Jasenovac in 2003. His successor, Shimon Peres, paid homage to the camp's victims when he visited Jasenovac on 25 July 2010 and laid a wreath at the memorial. Peres dubbed the Ustaše's crimes a "demonstration of sheer sadism".

The Jasenovac Memorial Museum reopened in November 2006 with a new exhibition designed by a Croatian architect, Helena Paver Njirić, and an Educational Center, designed by the firm Produkcija. The Memorial Museum features an interior of rubber-clad steel modules, video and projection screens, and glass cases displaying artifacts from the camp. Above the exhibition space, which is quite dark, is a field of glass panels inscribed with the names of the victims.

The New York City Parks Department, the Holocaust Park Committee and the Jasenovac Research Institute, with the help of then-Congressman Anthony Weiner (D-NY), established a public monument to the victims of Jasenovac in April 2005 (the sixtieth anniversary of the liberation of the camps.) The dedication ceremony was attended by ten Yugoslavian Holocaust survivors, as well as diplomats from Serbia, Bosnia and Israel. It remains the only public monument to Jasenovac victims outside the Balkans.

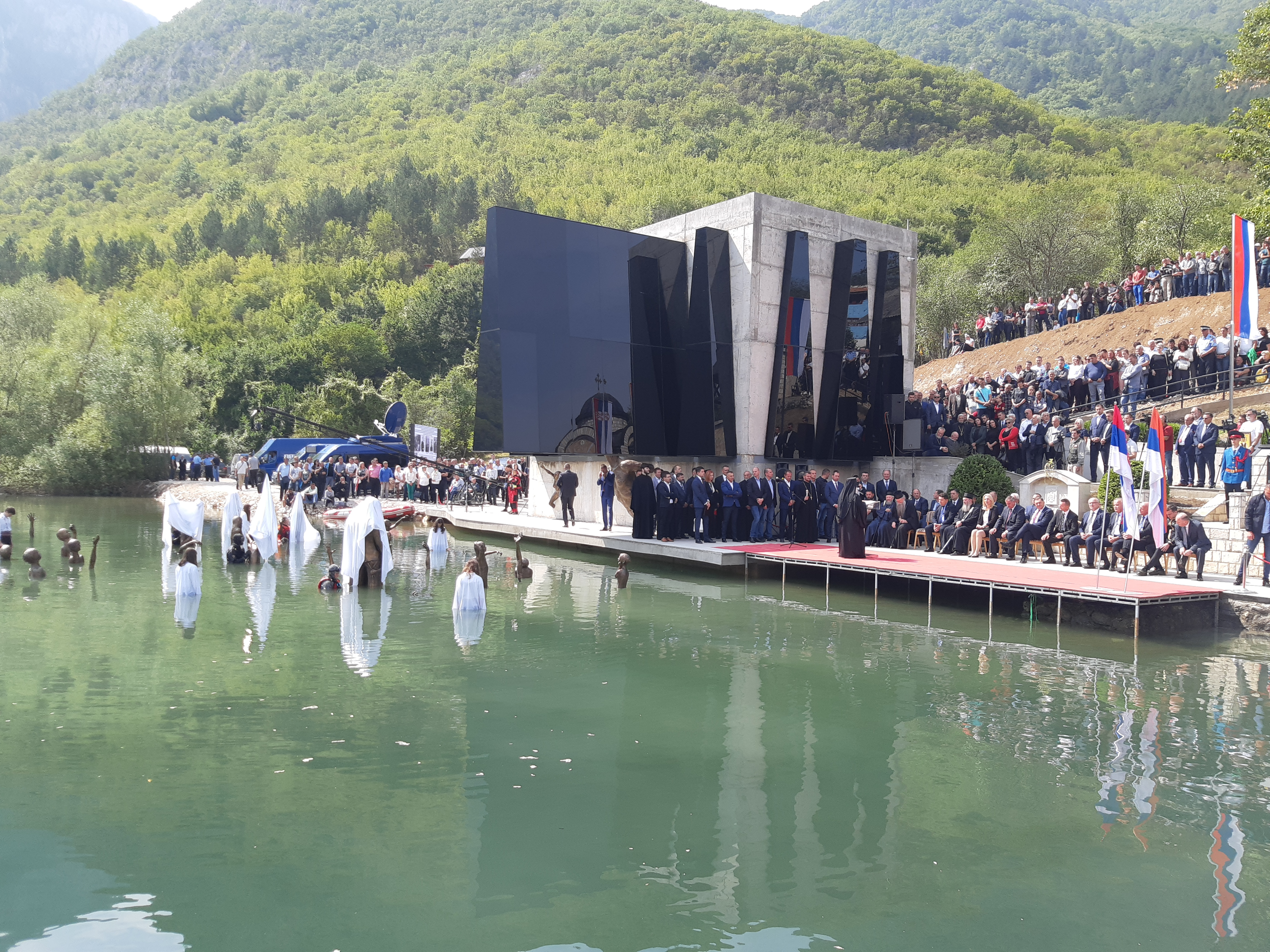
Memorial museum for victims of massacre in Stari Brod, Rogatica

Nowadays, оn 22 April, the anniversary of the prisoner breakout from the Jasenovac camp, Serbia marks the National Holocaust, World War II Genocide and other Fascist Crimes Victims Remembrance Day, while Croatia holds an official commemoration at the Jasenovac Memorial Site. Serbia and Bosnian entity of Republika Srpska hold a joint central commemoration at the Donja Gradina Memorial Zone.

In 2018, an exhibition named "Jasenovac – The Right to Remembrance" was held in the Headquarters of the United Nations in New York City within the marking of International Holocaust Remembrance Day, with the main goal of to foster a culture of remembrance of Serb, Jewish, Roma and anti-fascist victims of the Holocaust and genocide in the Jasenovac camp. On 22 April 2020, the president of Serbia Aleksandar Vučić had an official visit to the memorial park in Sremska Mitrovica, dedicated to the victims of genocide on the territory of Syrmia.

Commemoration ceremonies honoring the victims of the Jadovno concentration camp have been organized by the Serb National Council (SNV), the Jewish community in Croatia, and local anti-fascists since 2009, while 24 June has been designated as a "Day of Remembrance of the Jadovno Camp" in Croatia. On 26 August 2010, the 68th anniversary of the partial liberation of the Jastrebarsko children's camp, victims were commemorated in a ceremony at a monument in the Jastrebarsko cemetery. It was attended by only 40 people, mainly members of the Union of Anti-Fascist Fighters and Anti-Fascists of the Republic of Croatia. The Republic of Srpska Government holds a commemoration at the memorial site of the victims of the Ustaše massacres in the Drina Valley.

== In culture ==
=== Literature ===
- Jama (The Pit), a poem condemning the crimes of the Ustašas, written by Ivan Goran Kovačić
- Eagles Fly Early, a novel about children role in assisting the Partisans in the resistance against the Ustašas, written by Branko Ćopić
- Konclogor na Savi, an account by Ilija Jakovljević

=== Art ===
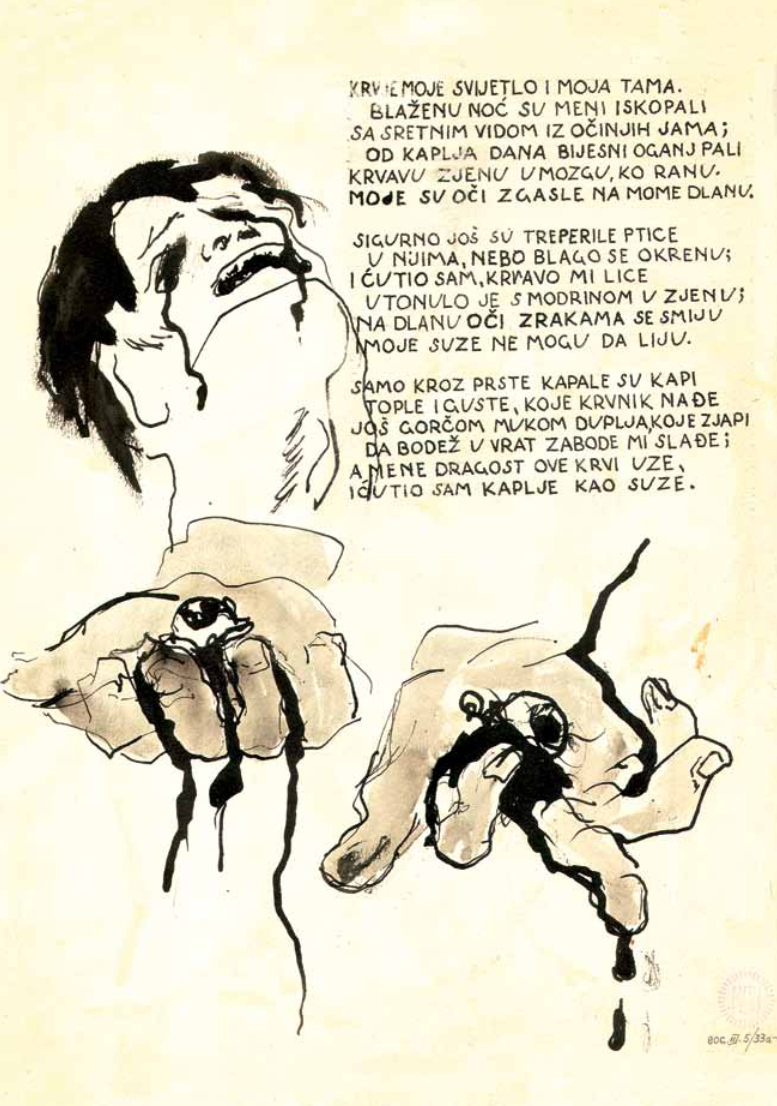
A page from Ivan Goran Kovačić's poem Jama with an illustration by Zlatko Prica

- Zlatko Prica and Edo Murtić illustrated scenes from the Ivan Goran Kovačić's poem Jama

=== Theater ===
- Golubnjača, a play by Jovan Radulović about ethnic relations in neighboring villages in the years after the Ustaša crimes

=== Films ===
- 1955 – Šolaja, a film about Serb rebellion against the genocide, directed by Vojislav Nanović
- 1960 – The Ninth Circle, a film directed by France Štiglic, includes scenes from the Jasenovac camp
- 1966 – Eagles Fly Early, film based on the eponymous novel directed by Soja Jovanović
- 1967 – Black Birds, a film about a group of prisoners of Stara Gradiška concentration camp, directed by Eduard Galić
- 1984 – The End of the War, a film about Serbian man takes his son to find and kill members of the Ustaša militia who tortured and killed his wife and mother, directed by Dragan Kresoja
- 1988 – Braća po materi, a film about Ustaša atrocities told through the story of two half-brothers, a Croat and a Serb, directed by Zdravko Šotra
- 2016 – Prva trećina – oproštaj kao kazna, a short feature film about the Žile Friganović's massacres, directed by Svetlana Petrov
- 2019 – The Diary of Diana B., a biographical film about aid operation of Diana Budisavljević for the rescue of more than 10,000 children from concentration camps, directed by Dana Budisavljević
- 2020 – Dara of Jasenovac, a film about a girl who survived the Jasenovac camp, directed by Predrag Antonijević

=== TV Series ===
- 1981 – Nepokoreni grad, a TV series about Ustaša terror campaign, including the Kerestinec camp, directed by Vanča Kljaković and Eduard Galić

=== Music ===
- Some survivors claim that the lyrics of the famous song "Đurđevdan" was written on a train that took prisoners from Sarajevo to the Jasenovac camp.
- Thompson, a Croatian rock musician, has garnered controversy for his purported glorification of Ustasha regime in his songs and concerts, including a performance of "Jasenovac i Gradiška Stara".

== See also ==
- Persecution of Eastern Orthodox Christians
- Anti-Serb sentiment
- Catholic clergy involvement with the Ustaše
- Croatian socialism

== Annotations ==
1. During the war, German military commanders gave different figures for the number of Serbs, Jews, and others killed by the Ustaše inside the NDH. Alexander Löhr claimed 400,000 Serbs killed, Massenbach around 700,000. Hermann Neubacher stated that Ustashe claims of a million Serbs slaughtered was a "boastful exaggeration", and believed that the number of 'defenseless victims slaughtered to be three-quarters of a million'. The Vatican cited 350,000 Serbs slaughtered by the end of 1942 (Eugène Tisserant). Yugoslavia presented 1,700,000 as its war casualties, produced by mathematician Vladeta Vučković, at the Paris Peace Treaties (1947). A secret 1964 government list counted 597,323 victims (out of which 346,740 were Serbs). In the 1980s Croat economist Vladimir Žerjavić concluded that the number of victims was around one million. Furthermore, he claimed that the number of Serb victims in the Independent State of Croatia was between 300,000 and 350,000, with 80,000 victims of all ethnicity in Jasenovac. Since the breakup of Yugoslavia, the Croatian side began suggesting substantially smaller numbers, while the Serbian side maintains the exaggerated numbers promoted within Yugoslavia until the 1990s.
2. The United States Holocaust Memorial Museum lists (as of 2012) a total of 320,000–340,000 ethnic Serbs killed in Croatia and Bosnia, and 45–52,000 killed at Jasenovac. The Yad Vashem center claims that more than 500,000 Serbs were murdered in Croatia, 250,000 were expelled, and another 200,000 were forced to convert to Catholicism.
3. According to K. Ungváry the actual number of Serbs deported was 25,000. Ramet cites the German statement. Serbian Orthodox bishop in America Dionisije Milivojević claimed 50,000 Serb colonists and settlers deported and 60,000 killed in the Hungarian occupation.
4. The only official Yugoslav data of war-victims in Kosovo and Metohija is from 1964, and counted 7,927 people, out of which 4,029 were Serbs, 1,460 Montenegrins, and 2,127 Albanians.

== Sources ==
=== Books ===
- Avramov, Smilja (1995). Genocide in Yugoslavia. BIGZ. ISBN 978-86-13-00798-2.
- Adriano, Pino; Cingolani, Giorgio (2018). Nationalism and Terror: Ante Pavelić and Ustasha Terrorism from Fascism to the Cold War. Central European University Press. ISBN 978-9-63386-206-3.
- Baker, Catherine (2015). The Yugoslav Wars of the 1990s. Macmillan International Higher Education. ISBN 978-1-137-39899-4.
- Bartulin, Nevenko (2013). The Racial Idea in the Independent State of Croatia: Origins and Theory. BRILL. ISBN 978-90-04-26282-9.
- Bataković, Dušan T., ed. (2005). Histoire du peuple serbe [History of the Serbian People] (in French). Lausanne: L'Age d'Homme.
- Bellamy, Alex J. (2013). The Formation of Croatian National Identity: A Centuries-Old Dream?. Manchester University Press. ISBN 978-1-84779-573-1.
- Biondich, Mark (2007a). "Controversies Surrounding the Catholic Church in Wartime Croatia, 1941–45". The Independent State of Croatia 1941–45. Routledge. pp. 31–59.
- Bulajić, Milan (2002). Jasenovac: The Jewish–Serbian Holocaust (the role of the Vatican) in Nazi-Ustasha Croatia (1941–1945). Belgrade: Fund for Genocide Research, Stručna knjiga.
- Bulajić, Milan (1994a). Tudjman's "Jasenovac Myth": Genocide against Serbs, Jews and Gypsies. Belgrade: Stručna knjiga.
- Bulajić, Milan (1994b). The Role of the Vatican in the break-up of the Yugoslav State: The Mission of the Vatican in the Independent State of Croatia. Ustashi Crimes of Genocide. Belgrade: Stručna knjiga.
- Bulajić, Milan (1992). Misija Vatikana u Nezavisnoj Državi Hrvatskoj: "Politika Stepinac" razbijanja jugoslovenske države i pokatoličavanja pravoslavnih Srba po cijenu genocida: stvaranje Civitas Dei—Antemurale Christianitatis. Politika.
- Bulajić, Milan (1992b). Never Again: Ustashi Genocide in the Independent State of Croatia (NDH) from 1941-1945. University of Michigan.
- Bulajić, Milan (1992c). Tudjman's "Jasenovac Myth": Ustasha Crimes of Genocide. Belgrade: The Ministry of information of the Republic of Serbia.
- Bulajić, Milan (1988–1989). Ustaški zločini genocida i suđenje Andriji Artukoviću 1986. godine. Vol. I–IV. Rad.
- Batchelor, Dahn A. (2012). Whistling in the Face of Robbers: The Life and Times of Dahn A. Batchelor. iUniverse. ISBN 978-1-4620-2815-3.
- Byford, Jovan (2020). Picturing Genocide in the Independent State of Croatia: Atrocity Images and the Contested Memory of the Second World War in the Balkans. Bloomsbury Publishing. ISBN 978-1-35001-597-5.
- Christia, Fotini (2012). Alliance Formation in Civil Wars. Cambridge University Press. ISBN 978-1-139-85175-6.
- Dakina, Gojo Riste (1994). Genocide Over the Serbs in the Independent State of Croatia: Be Catholic Or Die. Institute of Contemporary History.
- Dedijer, Vladimir (1992). The Yugoslav Auschwitz and the Vatican: The Croatian Massacre of the Serbs During World War II. Amherst: Prometheus Books. ISBN 978-0-87975-752-6.
- Dedijer, Vladimir (1987). Vatikan i Jasenovac: dokumenti. Rad.
- Djilas, Aleksa (1991). The Contested Country: Yugoslav Unity and Communist Revolution, 1919–1953. Harvard University Press. ISBN 978-0-674-16698-1.
- Dulić, Tomislav (2005). Utopias of Nation: Local Mass Killing in Bosnia and Herzegovina, 1941–42. Uppsala, Sweden: Uppsala University Library. ISBN 978-9-1554-6302-1.
- Đurić, Veljko (1991). Прекрштавање Срба у Независној Држави Хрватској: Прилози за историју верског геноцида. Београд: Алфа.
- Fischer, Bernd J. (2007). Balkan Strongmen: Dictators and Authoritarian Rulers of South-Eastern Europe. Purdue University Press. ISBN 978-1-55753-455-2.
- Glišić, Venceslav (1970). Teror i zločini nacističke Nemačke u Srbiji 1941-1944. Belgrade: Rad.
- Goldstein, Ivo (1999). Croatia: A History. C. Hurst & Co. Publishers. ISBN 978-1-85065-525-1.
- Goldstein, Ivo (2001). Holokaust u Zagrebu. Novi liber. ISBN 978-1-85065-525-1.
- Goldstein, Slavko (2013). 1941: The Year That Keeps Returning. New York Review of Books. ISBN 978-1-59017-700-6.
- Hale, Christopher (2011). Hitler's Foreign Executioners: Europe's Dirty Secret. United Kingdom: History Press. ISBN 9780752463933.
- Hoptner, Jacob B. (1962). Yugoslavia in Crisis, 1934-1941.
- Hory, Ladislaus; Broszat, Martin (1964). Der kroatische Ustascha-Staat 1941–1945. Stuttgart: Deutsche Verlags-Anstalt.
- Janjetović, Zoran (2008). "Die Vertreibungen auf dem Territorium des ehemaligen Jogoslawien" [The Expulsions from the Territory of the Former Yugoslavia]. In Bingen, Dieter; Borodziej, Włodzimierz; Troebst, Stefan (eds.). Vertreibungen europäisch erinnern? [Do You Remember the European Expulsions?] (in German). Wiesbaden, Germany: Otto Harrassowitz Verlag. pp. 153–157. ISBN 978-0-231-70050-4.
- Jevtić, Atanasije (1990). Velikomučenički Jasenovac: ustaška tvornica smrti: dokumenti i svedočenja. Glas crkve.
- Kljakić, Slobodan (1991). A Conspiracy of Silence: Genocide in the Independent State of Croatia and Concentration Camp Jasenovac. Ministry of Information of the Republic of Serbia.
- Kisić Kolanović, Nada (2001). NDH i Italija: političke veze i diplomatski odnosi [The NDH and Italy: Political Connections and Diplomatic Relations] (in Croatian). Naklada Ljevak. ISBN 978-953-178-460-3.
- Kočović, Bogoljub (2005). Sahrana jednog mita: žrtve Drugog svetskog rata u Jugoslaviji [Burial of a Myth: World War II Victims in Yugoslavia]. Beograd: Otkrovenje. ISBN 978-86-83353-39-2.
- Korb, Alexander (2010a). "A Multipronged Attack: Ustaša Persecution of Serbs, Jews, and Roma in Wartime Croatia". Eradicating Differences: The Treatment of Minorities in Nazi-Dominated Europe. Newcastle upon Tyne: Cambridge Scholars Publishing. pp. 145–163.
- Korb, Alexander (2010b). "Integrated Warfare? The Germans and the Ustaša Massacres: Syrmia 1942". In Shepherd, Ben (ed.). War in a Twilight World: Partisan and Anti-Partisan Warfare in Eastern Europe, 1939–1945. Palgrave Macmillan. ISBN 978-0-230-29048-8.
- Greif, Gideon (2018). Jasenovac - Auschwitz of the Balkans. Knjiga komerc. ISBN 978-965-572-727-2.
- Krestić, Vasilije (1998). Through genocide to a greater Croatia. BIGZ.
- Krestić, Vasilije (2009). Dosije o genezi genocida nad Srbima u NDH. Prometej.
- Kurdulija, Strahinja (1993). Atlas of the Ustasha genocide of the Serbs 1941–1945. Foundation for truth of Serbs. ISBN 978-86-7941-002-3.
- Lemkin, Raphael (2008). Axis Rule in Occupied Europe. Clark, New Jersey: The Lawbook Exchange. ISBN 978-1-58477-901-8.
- Levy, Michele Frucht (2011). "'The Last Bullet for the Last Serb': The Ustaša Genocide against Serbs: 1941–1945". In Crowe, David (ed.). Crimes of State Past and Present: Government-Sponsored Atrocities and International Legal Responses. Routledge. pp. 54–84.
- Lituchy, Barry M., ed. (2006). Jasenovac and the Holocaust in Yugoslavia: Analyses and Survivor Testimonies. New York: Jasenovac Research Institute.
- McCormick, Robert B. (2014). Croatia Under Ante Pavelić: America, the Ustaše and Croatian Genocide. London-New York: I.B. Tauris.
- Mirković, Jovan (2014). Злочини над Србима у Независној Држави Хрватској – фотомонографија [Crimes against Serbs in the Independent State of Croatia]. Belgrade: Svet knjige. ISBN 978-86-7396-465-2. Archived from the original on 8 April 2016.
- Mitrović, Jeremija D. (1991). Највећи злочини садашњице: Патње и страдање српског народа у Независној држави Хрватској од 1941–1945. Дечје новине. ISBN 978-86-367-0486-8.
- Mojzes, Paul (2008). "The Genocidal Twentieth Century in the Balkans". In Jacobs, Steven L. (ed.). Confronting Genocide: Judaism, Christianity, Islam. Lanham: Lexington Books. pp. 151–182.
- Mojzes, Paul (2011). Balkan Genocides: Holocaust and Ethnic Cleansing in the 20th Century. Lanham: Rowman & Littlefield. ISBN 978-1-4422-0663-2.
- Novak, Viktor (2011a). Magnum Crimen: Half a Century of Clericalism in Croatia. Vol. 1. Jagodina: Gambit. ISBN 978-86-7624-049-4.
- Novak, Viktor (2011b). Magnum Crimen: Half a Century of Clericalism in Croatia. Vol. 2. Jagodina: Gambit. ISBN 978-86-7624-049-4.
- Paris, Edmond (1961). Genocide in Satellite Croatia, 1941–1945: A Record of Racial and Religious Persecutions and Massacres. Chicago: American Institute for Balkan Affairs.
- Paris, Edmond (1988). Convert— or die!: Catholic persecution in Yugoslavia during World War II. Chick Publications.
- Pavlowitch, Stevan K. (2008). Hitler's New Disorder: The Second World War in Yugoslavia. New York: Columbia University Press. ISBN 978-0-231-70050-4.
- Ramet, Sabrina P. (2006). The Three Yugoslavias: State-Building and Legitimation, 1918–2005. New York: Indiana University Press. ISBN 978-0-253-34656-8.
- Ramet, Sabrina P.; Listhaug, Ola, eds. (2011). Serbia and the Serbs in World War Two. Palgrave Macmillan UK. ISBN 978-0-230-34781-6.
- Ramet, Sabrina (2007). The Independent State of Croatia 1941-45. New York: Routledge. ISBN 978-0-415-44055-4.
- Ramet, Sabrina (2007b). Democratic Transition in Croatia: Value Transformation, Education, and Media. Texas A&M University Press. ISBN 978-1-60344-452-1.
- Kolstø, Pål (2011). "The Serbian-Croatian Controversy over Jasenovac". Serbia and the Serbs in World War Two. pp. 225–246.
- Phayer, Michael (2000). The Catholic Church and the Holocaust, 1930–1965. Bloomington and Indianapolis: Indiana University Press. ISBN 978-0-253-33725-2.
- Ungváry, Krisztián (2011). Vojvodina under Hungarian rule.
- Rapaić, Mirko (1999). Lička tragedija: hrvatski zločini genocida nad srpskim narodom 1941. do 1945. Srpska reč. ISBN 978-86-491-0034-3.
- Rivelli, Marco Aurelio (1998). Le génocide occulté: État Indépendant de Croatie 1941–1945 [Hidden Genocide: The Independent State of Croatia 1941–1945] (in French). Lausanne: L'age d'Homme.
- Rivelli, Marco Aurelio (1999). L'arcivescovo del genocidio: Monsignor Stepinac, il Vaticano e la dittatura ustascia in Croazia, 1941–1945 [The Archbishop of Genocide: Monsignor Stepinac, the Vatican and the Ustaše dictatorship in Croatia, 1941–1945] (in Italian). Milano: Kaos.
- Rivelli, Marco Aurelio (2002). "Dio è con noi!": La Chiesa di Pio XII complice del nazifascismo ["God is with us!": The Church of Pius XII accomplice to Nazi Fascism] (in Italian). Milano: Kaos.
- Roberts, Walter R. (1973). Tito, Mihailović and the Allies 1941–1945. Rutgers University Press. ISBN 978-0-8135-0740-8.
- Rogel, Carole (2004). The Breakup of Yugoslavia and Its Aftermath. Greenwood Publishing Group. ISBN 0-313323-57-7.
- Sedlar, Jean W. (2007). The Axis Empire in Southeast Europe, 1939–1945. BookLocker.com. ISBN 978-1-60145-297-9.
- Simić, Sima (1958). Прекрштавање Срба за време Другог светског рата. Титоград: Графички завод.
- Škiljan, Filip (2014). Organizirana prisilna iseljavanja Srba iz NDH (PDF). Zagreb: Srpsko narodno vijeće. ISBN 978-953-7442-13-2. Archived from the original (PDF) on 13 March 2018.
- Skoko, Savo (1991). Pokolji hercegovačkih Srba '41. Belgrade: Stručna knjiga.
- Stanišić, Mihailo (1999). Slom, genocid, odmazda. Službeni list SRJ.
- Tomasevich, Jozo (1975). War and Revolution in Yugoslavia, 1941–1945: The Chetniks. Stanford: Stanford University Press. ISBN 978-0-8047-0857-9.
- Tomasevich, Jozo (2001). War and Revolution in Yugoslavia, 1941–1945: Occupation and Collaboration. Stanford: Stanford University Press. ISBN 978-0-8047-7924-1.
- Jonassohn, Kurt; Björnson, Karin (1998). Genocide and Gross Human Rights Violations: In Comparative Perspective. Transaction Publishers. ISBN 978-1-4128-2445-3.
- Carmichael, Cathie; Maguire, Richard C. (2015). The Routledge History of Genocide. The Routledge. ISBN 978-1-317-51484-8.
- Kallis, Aristotle (2008). Genocide and Fascism: The Eliminationist Drive in Fascist Europe. Routledge. ISBN 978-1-134-30034-1.
- Suppan, Arnold (2014). Hitler - Beneš - Tito: Konflikt, Krieg und Völkermord in Ostmittel- und Südosteuropa. Austrian Academy of Sciences.
- Ognyanova, Irina (2000). "Nationalism and National Policy in Independent State of Croatia (1941–1945)". In Rogers, Dorothy; Joshua, Wheeler; Zavacká, Marína; Casebier, Shawna (eds.). Topics in Feminism, History and Philosophy, IWM Junior Visiting Fellows Conferences, Vol. 6. Vienna, Austria: Otto Harrassowitz Verlag.
- Kenrick, Donald (2006). The Final Chapter. University of Hertfordshire Press. ISBN 978-1-902806-49-5.
- Barbier, Mary Kathryn (2017). Spies, Lies, and Citizenship: The Hunt for Nazi Criminals. University of Nebraska Press. ISBN 978-1-61234-971-8.
- Bloxham, Donald; Gerwarth, Robert (2011). Political Violence in Twentieth-Century Europe. Cambridge University Press. ISBN 978-1-139-50129-3.
- Israeli, Raphael (2013). The Death Camps of Croatia: Visions and Revisions, 1941-1945 Europe. Transaction Publishers. ISBN 978-1-4128-4975-3.
- Domenico, Roy Palmer; Hanley, Mark (2006). Encyclopedia of Modern Christian Politics: L-Z. Greenwood Publishing Group. ISBN 978-0-313-33890-8.
- Adeli, Lisa Marie (2009). Resistance to the Persecution of Ethnic Minorities in Croatia and Bosnia During World War II. Greenwood Publishing Group Edwin Mellen Press. ISBN 978-0-7734-4745-5.
- Shepherd, Ben (2012). Terror in the Balkans. Harvard University Press.
- Weiss-Wendt, Anton (2010). Eradicating Differences: The Treatment of Minorities in Nazi-Dominated Europe. Cambridge Scholars Publishing. ISBN 978-1-4438-2449-1.
- Touval, Saadia (2001). Mediation in the Yugoslav Wars: The Critical Years, 1990-95. Springer. ISBN 978-0-230-28866-9.
- Trencsényi, Balázs; Kopecek, Michal (2007). National Romanticism: The Formation of National Movements: Discourses of Collective Identity in Central and Southeast Europe 1770–1945, volume II. Budapest: Central European University Press. ISBN 978-615-5211-24-9.
- Yeomans, Rory (2011). ""For us, beloved commander, you will never die!" Mourning Jure Francetić, Ustasha Death Squad Leader". In Haynes, Rebecca; Rady, Martyn (eds.). In the Shadow of Hitler: Personalities of the Right in Central and Eastern Europe. London: I.B. Tauris. ISBN 978-1-84511-697-2.
- Yeomans, Rory (2012). Visions of Annihilation: The Ustasha Regime and the Cultural Politics of Fascism, 1941–1945. Pittsburgh: University of Pittsburgh Press. ISBN 978-0-8229-7793-3.
- Yeomans, Rory (2015). The Utopia of Terror: Life and Death in Wartime Croatia. Boydell & Brewer. ISBN 978-1-58046-545-8.
- Žerjavić, Vladimir (1993). Yugoslavia: Manipulations with the Number of Second World War Victims. Zagreb, Croatia: Croatian Information Centre. ISBN 0-919817-32-7. Archived from the original on 3 March 2016.
- Vajagić, Predrag M. (2013). Istorijska analiza osnivanja i funkcionisanja Dunavske banovine u Kraljevini Jugoslaviji (PDF). Novi Sad: Filozofski fakultet Univerziteta u Novom Sadu, odsek za istoriju.
- Jonassohn, Kurt (1998). Genocide and Gross Human Rights Violations: In Comparative Perspective. Transaction Publishers. ISBN 978-1-4128-2445-3.
- Bellamy, Alex J. (2003). The Formation of Croatian National Identity: A Centuries-old Dream. Manchester University Press. ISBN 978-0-7190-6502-6.
- Bideleux, Robert; Jeffries, Ian (2007). The Balkans: A Post-Communist History. Routledge. ISBN 978-1-134-58328-7.
- Carmichael, Cathie (2012). Ethnic Cleansing in the Balkans: Nationalism and the Destruction of Tradition. Routledge. ISBN 978-1-134-47953-5.
- Weiss Wendt, Anton (2010). Eradicating Differences: The Treatment of Minorities in Nazi-Dominated Europe. Cambridge Scholars Publishing. ISBN 978-1-4438-2449-1.
- Hoare, Marko Attila (2006). Genocide and Resistance in Hitler's Bosnia: The Partisans and the Chetniks 1941–1943. New York: Oxford University Press. ISBN 978-0-19-726380-8.
- Greer, Joanne Marie; Moberg, David O. (2001). Research in the Social Scientific Study of Religion.v.10. Brill. ISBN 978-0-7623-0483-7.
- Schindley, Wanda; Makara, Petar (2005). Jasenovac: proceedings of the First International Conference and Exhibit on the Jasenovac Concentration Camps, October 29-31, 1997, Kingsborough Community College of the City University of New York. Dallas Pub. ISBN 978-0-912011-64-6.
- Jacobs, Steven L. (2009). Confronting Genocide: Judaism, Christianity, Islam. Lexington Books. ISBN 978-0-7391-3589-1.
- Stover, Eric; Peskin, Victor; Koenig, Alexa (2016). Hiding in Plain Sight: The Pursuit of War Criminals from Nuremberg to the War on Terror. University of California Press. ISBN 978-0-520-27805-9.
- Bürgschwentner, Joachim; Egger, Matthias; Barth-Scalmani, Gunda (2014). Other Fronts, Other Wars?: First World War Studies on the Eve of the Centennial. Brill. ISBN 978-90-04-24365-1.
- Trbovich, Ana S. (2008). A Legal Geography of Yugoslavia's Disintegration. Oxford University Press. ISBN 978-0-19-971547-3.
- Cvetković, Dragan (2009). Bosna i Hercegovina: numeričko određenje ljudskih gubitaka u Drugom svetskom ratu. Belgrade: Музеj жртава геноцида. ISBN 978-86-86831-01-9.
- Barić, Nikola (2019). Historiae patriaeque cultor. Slavonski Brod: Hrvatski institut za povijest. ISBN 978-953-8102-23-3.
- Velikonja, Mitja (2003). Religious Separation and Political Intolerance in Bosnia-Herzegovina. Texas A&M University Press. ISBN 978-1-58544-226-3.
- Zatezalo, Đuro (2005). "Radio sam svoj seljački i kovački posao": svjedočanstva genocida. Zagreb: SKD Prosvijeta. ISBN 953-6627-79-5.
- Zatezalo, Đuro (1989). Kotar Gospić i Kotar Perušić u narodnooslobodilačkom ratu, 1941-1945. Karlovac: Historijski arhiv u Karlovcu. ISBN 978-86-80783-04-8.
- Abtahi, Hirad; Boas, Gideon (2005). The Dynamics of International Criminal Justice: Essays in Honour of Sir Richard May. Leiden, The Netherlands: BRILL. ISBN 978-90-474-1780-4.
- Ravlić, Slaven (1997). "Andrija Artuković". In Dizdar, Zdenko; Grčić, Marko; Ravlić, Slaven; Stuparić, Darko (eds.). Tko je tko u NDH. Zabreg, Croatia: Minerva. pp. 11–12. ISBN 978-953-6377-03-9.
- Ciment, James; Hill, Kenneth (2012). Political Violence in Twentieth-Century Europe. Routledge. ISBN 978-1-136-59621-6.
- Sindbaek, Tia (2012). Usable History?: Representations of Yugoslavia's Difficult Past from 1945 to 2002. ISD LLC. ISBN 978-8-77124-107-5.
- Horvitz, Leslie Alan; Catherwood, Christopher (2014). Encyclopedia of War Crimes and Genocide. Infobase Publishing. ISBN 978-1-4381-1029-5.
- Parenti, Michael (2002). To Kill a Nation: The Attack on Yugoslavia. Verso Books. ISBN 978-1-85984-366-6.
- Walasek, Helen (2016). Bosnia and the Destruction of Cultural Heritage. Routledge. ISBN 978-1-317-17299-4.

=== Journals ===
- Antonijević, Nenad (2003). "Stradanje srpskog i crnogorskog civilnog stanovništva na Kosovu i Metohiji 1941. godine". Dijalog Povjesničara-istoričara. 8: 355–369.
- Antonijević, Nenad M. (2016). "Ратни злочини на Косову и Метохији: 1941–1945. године". Универзитет у Београду, Филозофски факултет.
- Bartulin, Nevenko (October 2007). "Ideologija nacije i rase: ustaški režim i politika prema Srbima u Nezavisnoj Državi Hrvatskoj 1941–1945" (PDF). Radovi (in Croatian). 39 (1): 209–241.
- Bartulin, Nevenko (2008). "The Ideology of Nation and Race: The Croatian Ustasha Regime and its Policies toward the Serbs in the Independent State of Croatia 1941–1945". Croatian Studies Review. 5: 75–102.
- Biondich, Mark (2005). "Religion and Nation in Wartime Croatia: Reflections on the Ustaša Policy of Forced Religious Conversions, 1941–1942". The Slavonic and East European Review. 83 (1): 71–116. doi:10.1353/see.2005.0063. JSTOR 4214049. S2CID 151704526.
- Biondich, Mark (2006). "Controversies Surrounding the Catholic Church in Wartime Croatia, 1941–45". Totalitarian Movements and Political Religions. 7 (4): 429–457. doi:10.1080/14690760600963222. S2CID 143351253.
- Biondich, Mark (2007b). "Radical Catholicism and Fascism in Croatia, 1918–1945". Totalitarian Movements and Political Religions. 8 (2): 383–399. doi:10.1080/14690760701321346. S2CID 145148083.
- Boban, Ljubo (1993). "Kada je i kako nastala Država Slovenaca, Hrvata i Srba" [When and how did the State of Slovenes, Croats, and Serbs come into existence (Summary)]. Journal of the Institute of Croatian History. 26 (1): 187–198.
- Byford, Jovan (2007). "When I say "The Holocaust," I mean "Jasenovac": Remembrance of the Holocaust in contemporary Serbia". East European Jewish Affairs. 37 (1): 51–74. doi:10.1080/13501670701197946. S2CID 161763723.
- Cvetković, Dragan (2011). "Holokaust u Nezavisnoj Državi Hrvatskoj – numeričko određenje" [Holocaust in Independent State of Croatia]. Istorija 20. Veka: Časopis Instituta za Savremenu Istoriju. 29 (1): 163–182. doi:10.29362/ist20veka.2011.1.cve.163-182.
- Gumz, Jonathan (Fall 1998). "German Counterinsurgency Policy in Independent Croatia, 1941-1944". The Historian. 61 (1): 33–50.
- Hehn, Paul N. (1971). "Serbia, Croatia and Germany 1941–1945: Civil War and Revolution in the Balkans". Canadian Slavonic Papers. 13 (4): 344–373. doi:10.1080/00085006.1971.11091249.
- Jolić, Robert (2010). "Novi prilozi za životopis Fra Radoslava dr. Glavaša" [New additions for Friar Radoslav Glavaš's, PhD, biography]. Stopama Pobijenih. III (2): 26–34.
- Kataria, Shyamal (2015). "Serbian Ustashe Memory and Its Role in the Yugoslav Wars, 1991–1995". Mediterranean Quarterly. 26 (2): 115–127. doi:10.1215/10474552-2914550. S2CID 154634001.
- Krestić, Vasilije (1986). "O genezi genocida nad Srbima u NDH". Književne Novine. 15.
- Levy, Michele Frucht (2009). ""The Last Bullet for the Last Serb": The Ustaša Genocide against Serbs: 1941–1945". Nationalities Papers. 37 (6): 807–837. doi:10.1080/00905990903239174. S2CID 162231741.
- Lisac, A. L. (1956). "Deportacije Srba iz Hrvatske 1941". Historijski Zbornik. 9: 125–145.
- McCormick, Rob (2008). "The United States' Response to Genocide in the Independent State of Croatia, 1941–1945". Genocide Studies and Prevention. 3 (1): 75–98. doi:10.1353/gsp.2011.0060. S2CID 145309437.
- Newman, John Paul (2017). "War Veterans, Fascism, and Para-Fascist Departures in the Kingdom of Yugoslavia, 1918–1941". Fascism. 6: 42–74. doi:10.1163/22116257-00601003.
- Newman, John Paul (2014). "Serbian and Habsburg Military institutional legacies in Yugoslavia after 1918" (PDF). First World War Studies. 5 (3): 319–335. doi:10.1080/19475020.2014.1001519. S2CID 73611212.
- Pavasović Trošt, Tamara (2018). "Ruptures and continuities in nationhood narratives: reconstructing the nation through history textbooks in Serbia and Croatia". Nations and Nationalism. 24 (3): 716–740. doi:10.1111/nana.12433. S2CID 242057219.
- Dulić, Tomislav (2006). "Mass killing in the Independent State of Croatia, 1941–1945: a case for comparative research". Journal of Genocide Research. 8 (3): 255–281. doi:10.1080/14623520600949981. S2CID 242057219.
- Mirković, D. (2000). "The historical link between the Ustasha genocide and the Croato-Serb civil war: 1991-1995". Journal of Genocide Research. 2 (3): 363–373. doi:10.1080/713677614. S2CID 72467680.
- Škiljan, F. (2007). "Stradanje Srba u Jasenovcu u Drugom svjetskom ratu". Pro Tempore: Ččasopis Studenata Povijesti. 4: 40–46.
- Škiljan, F. (2004). "Hate speech in Independent State of Croatia during WWII". Ljetopis Srpskog Kulturnog Društva Prosvjeta. 9: 243–.
- Škiljan, Filip (2012). "Organizirano masovno prisilno iseljavanje srba iz Hrvatske 1941. Godine" [Organized Massive Forced Migration of Serbs from Croatia in 1941] (PDF). Stanovništvo = Population = Naselenie. 50 (2): 1–34. doi:10.2298/STNV1202001S. ISSN 0038-982X.
- Škiljan, Filip (2010). "Stradanje Srba, Židova i Roma u virovitičkom i slatinskom kraju tijekom 1941. i početkom 1942. godine". Scrinia Slavonica. 10. Hrvatski institut za povijest - Podružnica za povijest Slavonije, Srijema i Baranje: 360–362.
- Slany, William; Eizenstat, Stuart (1998). "U.S. and Allied Wartime and Postwar Relations and Negotiations with Argentina, Portugal, Spain, Sweden, and Turkey on Looted Gold and German External Assets and U.S. Concerns about the Fate of the Wartime Ustasha Treasury: Supplement to Preliminary Study on U.S. and Allied Efforts to Recover and Restore Gold and Other Assets Stolen Or Hidden by Germany During World War II". Department of State.
- Stojanović, Aleksandar (2017). "A Beleaguered Church: The Serbian Orthodox Church in the Independent State of Croatia (NDH) 1941–1945". Balcanica (48): 269–287. doi:10.2298/BALC1748269S.
- Stojanović, Aleksandar (2023). "A Croatian and Catholic State: The Ustasha Regime and Religious Communities in the Independent State of Croatia". Balcanica (54): 193–222. doi:10.2298/BALC2354193S.
- Vukčević, Slavko (1995). "Ratni zločini i genocid u Jugoslaviji od 1941. do 1945. godine" [War crimes and genocide in Yugoslavia from 1941 till 1945]. Vojno Delo. 47 (3): 192–200.
- Vuković, Slobodan V. (2004). "Uloga Vatikana u razbijanju Jugoslavije". Sociološki pregled. 38 (3): 423–443. doi:10.5937/socpreg0403423V.
- Yeomans, Rory (2005). "Cults of Death and Fantasies of Annihilation: The Croatian Ustasha Movement in Power, 1941–45". Central Europe. 3 (2): 121–142. doi:10.1179/147909605x69383. S2CID 143062602.
- Pavlović, Marko (2012). Časlav Ocić (ed.). "Jugoslovenska kraljevina prva evropska regionalna država" (PDF). Zbornik Matice srpske za društvene nauke. 141. Novi Sad: Matica srpska: 503–521. ISSN 0352-5732.
- Byford, Jovan (2014). "Remembering Jasenovac: Survivor Testimonies and the Cultural Dimension of Bearing Witness" (PDF). Holocaust and Genocide Studies. 28 (1): 58–84. doi:10.1093/hgs/dcu011. S2CID 145546608.
- Odak, Stipe; Benčić, Andriana (2016). "Jasenovac — A Past That Does Not Pass: The Presence of Jasenovac in Croatian and Serbian Collective Memory of Conflict". East European Politics and Societies and Cultures. 30 (4): 805–829. doi:10.1177/0888325416653657. S2CID 148091289.
- Sokol, Anida (2014). "War Monuments: Instruments of Nation-building in Bosnia and Herzegovina". Croatian Political Science Review. 51 (5): 105–126.
- Balić, Emily Greble (2009). "When Croatia Needes Serbs: Nationalism and Genocide in Sarajevo, 1941-1942". Slavic Review. 68 (1): 116–138. doi:10.2307/20453271. JSTOR 20453271.
- Perrone, Fiorella (2017). "The Horror in the Balkans. Civilian Victims in the Second World War in the Former Yugoslavia". L'Osservatorio.
- Kasapović, Mirjana (2018). "Genocid u NDH: Umanjivanje, banaliziranje i poricanje zločina". Politička Misao: Časopis za Politologiju. 55 (1): 7–33. doi:10.20901/pm.55.1.01.
- King, Charles (2012). "Can There Be a Political Science of the Holocaust?". Perspectives on Politics. 10 (2): 323–341. doi:10.1017/S1537592712000692. S2CID 145464503.
- Payne, Stanley G. (2006). "The NDH State in Comparative Perspective". Totalitarian Movements and Political Religions. 7 (4): 409–415. doi:10.1080/14690760600963198. S2CID 144782263.
- Sadkovich, James (2010). "Forging Consensus: How Franjo Tuđman Became an Authoritarian Nationalist". Review of Croatian History. 6 (1): 7–35.
- Radonic, Ljiljana Radonic (2013). "Croatia's Politics of the Past during the Tuđman Era (1990–1999)—Old Wine in New Bottles?". Totalitarian Movements and Political Religions. 44: 234–254. doi:10.1017/S0067237813000143. S2CID 145718988.

=== Other ===
- SANU (1995). Genocid nad Srbima u II svetskom ratu. Muzej žrtava genocida i Srpska književna zadruga.
- Gutman, Israel, ed. (1990). "Ustase". Encyclopedia of the Holocaust. Vol. 4. Macmillan.
- Latinović, Goran (2006). "On Croatian history textbooks". Association of Descendants and Supporters of Victims of Complex of Death Camps NDH, Gospić-Jadovno-Pag 1941.
- Bergholz, Max (2012). "None of us Dared Say Anything: Mass Killing in a Bosnian Community during World War Two and the Postwar Culture of Silence" (PDF). University of Toronto.
- Deutschland Military Tribunal (1950). Trials of war criminals before the Nuernberg Military Tribunals under Control Council Law no. 10: Nuernberg Oct. 1946 – April 1949 Vol. 11 The High Command case. The Hostage case. Case 12. US v. von Leeb. Case 7. US v. List. Washington, D.C.: United States Government Printing Office. OCLC 247746272.
- Yeomans, Rory (4 July 2024). "Croatia Must Stop Downplaying the Genocidal Crimes of the Ustasa". Balkan Insight.
