= Crusaders (guerrilla) =

Croatian anti-communist terrorist group

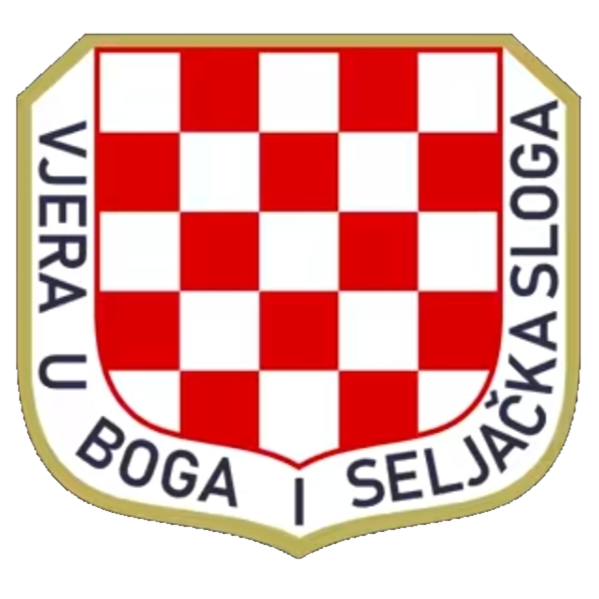
- Coat of arms of Crusaders
- Leader: Vjekoslav Luburić
- Dates active: 8 May 1945–1950 (small remnants were active until the mid 1960s)
- Allegiance: Frankist elements of HSS (alleged)
- Ideology: Ustašism; Neo-fascism; Croatian nationalism Agrarianism; Pravashism
- Political position: Far-right
- Status: Dissolved
- Size: Around 2,000
- Part of: UHRO
- Wars: Crusader Rebellion

The Crusaders (Croatian: Križari, also known as Škripari) were a Croatian pro-Ustashe anti-communist guerrilla army. Their activities started after the capitulation of the Independent State of Croatia (NDH) in May 1945, towards the end of World War II. They rose up for the restoration of the NDH until 1950.

== During World War II ==
The leadership of the Independent State of Croatia was preparing for the impending major battles against the Yugoslav Partisans who were in 1944 reinforced by the Red Army. They wanted to establish a front on the Varaždin-Koprivnica-Sisak-Petrinja-Karlovac line. They also wanted to establish a guerrilla army that would fight behind the front lines. This guerrilla force would also, if necessary, fight the British, Americans, and Soviets. During the penultimate meeting of the Main Ustaše Headquarters, it was discussed whether a guerrilla force should be created, and if so, how this army would fight. A plan for moving the Croatian Army through Bosnia was already accepted when Ante Pavelić ordered the army's retreat through Slovenia towards Austria (at the time in the British occupation zone).

Preparations for guerrilla warfare began in 1943 when the Germans formed the Jagdverbände. These formations used the same tactics as the guerrillas who fought against them. Staff jobs, that is planning, logistic, technical work and training were performed by German army experts, while the Ustaše provided the manpower. The guerrilla units were named S-Units (S Skupine). Due to Italian capitulation the plan was implemented in 1944, and in 1945 the plan included the whole of what was then Croatian territory. Croatian guerrilla actions against Yugoslav Partisans were not notable during the war, but they influenced post-war guerrilla combat. Notable people who worked with the S-Units were Vjekoslav Luburić, Ljubo Miloš and Dinko Šakić.

Regardless, the majority of the Armed Forces of the Independent State of Croatia and a large number of Ustaše members retreated towards the Austrian and Italian borders.

== After the reestablishment of Yugoslavia ==
Soldiers who returned from abroad in mid-1945 acted in unorganized, small groups, which provided a foundation for future guerrilla forces.

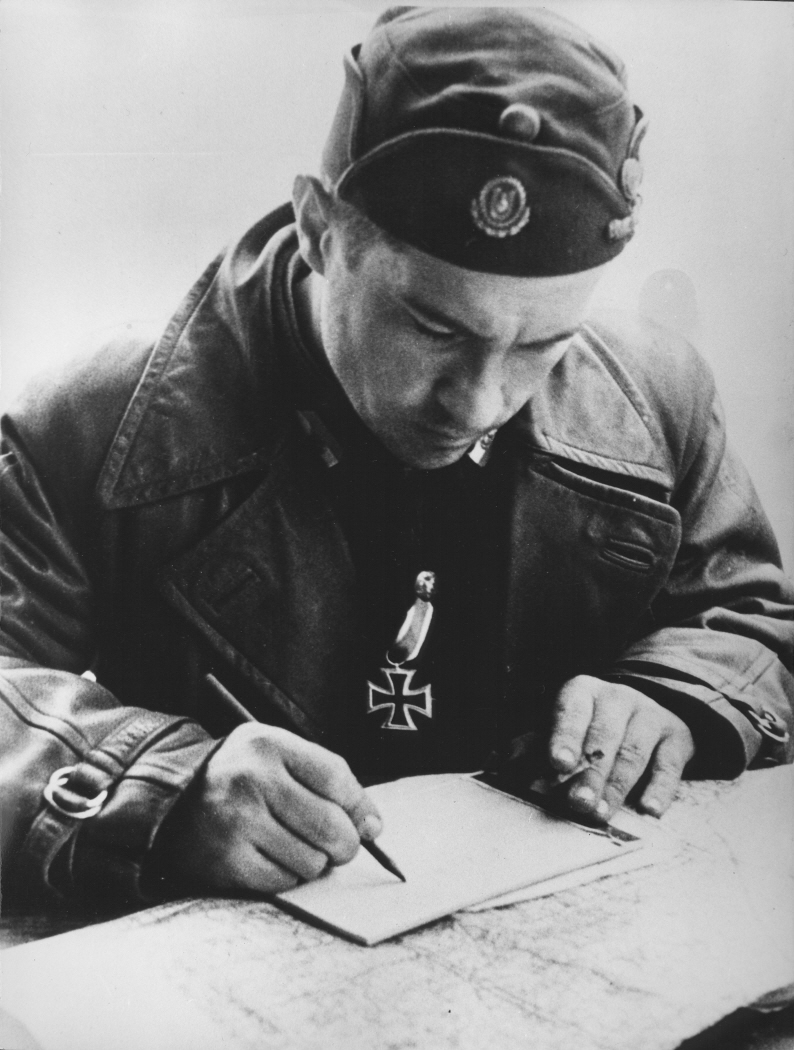
Vjekoslav "Maks" Luburić was the commander of the Crusaders

Crusaders in Croatia and Bosnia-Herzegovina were mostly former personnel of the Armed Forces of the NDH, mostly Ustaše, but also Croatian Home Guard, members of the former Croatian legionnaire divisions of the Wehrmacht and non-military Ustaše members.

Croatian historian Zdravko Dizdar describes the Crusaders mostly as soldiers and other individuals associated with the NDH army who went underground for fear of their lives, because the Partisans had engaged significant OZNA resources in tracking them down, which led to either their summary executions, judicial executions, or long prison sentences. Any known associates of eliminated Crusaders, mostly their relatives, were also often targeted by the Partisan military and political apparatus.

Despite the name, the Crusaders were not a religious movement. Religion was a banner that they used to distinguish themselves from atheist communists. Most supporters of the Crusaders were Catholic but there were also many Muslim members, including the Crusader commander in Sarajevo, Hasan Biber. They also stated that the Yugoslav partisans were a Serbian anti-Croat movement. There was also support for the Crusaders in anti-Communist emigrant communities, especially in Spain, Argentina, Canada, the United States, and West Germany.

The Yugoslav Department of State Security (UDBA) blamed the Croatian Peasant Party (HSS, also called Mačekovci) and the Catholic clergy for the creation of the Crusaders. The UDBA claimed that the name "Crusaders" was coined in June 1945, when remaining elements of the Croatian Armed Forces and the clerical part of the HSS joined. The UDBA states that remains of Ustaše bandits under wing of a Pastoral Letter took the name "Crusaders". The Crusaders' insignia was the Croatian Coat of Arms with the white cross, or the Ustaše sign with the "U" replaced with a white cross. Their flag was the Croatian tricolor with the slogan "For Croatia and Christ Against Communists" ("Za Hrvatsku i Krista protiv komunista") on one side, and "In this sign thou shalt conquer" ("U ovom ćeš znaku pobijediti") on the other. The Croatian guerrillas were called various names: Crusaders (križari), Cavers (Špiljari), Škripari, Kamišari (cavers), Jamari (cavers), Šumnjaci (forest people), even White Partisans (bijeli partizani). The name "Crusaders" was used universally, while the other names were used regionally.

== Crusader Rebellion ==
Crusader Rebellion
- Part of Aftermath of the Second World War, Cold War and Anti-communist insurgencies in Central and Eastern Europe
Date	8 May 1945 – 1952 (activity continued until mid 1960s)
Location	Socialist Republic of Croatia and Socialist Republic of Bosnia and Herzegovina, Socialist Federal Republic of Yugoslavia
Result	Yugoslav government victory: Pro-Ustaše rebellion suppressed; Almost all Crusader members were either killed or arrested; Most Ustaša commanders and camp administrators were captured and killed; Operation Gvardijan broke the attempt of Ustaša émigrés to conduct terrorist attacks and many Ustaša commanders and camp administrators were captured; Crusader activity continued until the mid-1960s

Belligerents
(Socialist Federal Republic of Yugoslavia) Yugoslavia; JNA (Socialist Federal Republic of Yugoslavia) OZNA (Socialist Federal Republic of Yugoslavia) UDBA	Crusaders

Commanders and leaders
(Socialist Federal Republic of Yugoslavia) Josip Broz Tito (Socialist Federal Republic of Yugoslavia) Ivan Ribar	(Independent State of Croatia) Ante Pavelić X (Independent State of Croatia) Vjekoslav Luburić (WIA) (Independent State of Croatia) Ljubo Miloš (executed) (Independent State of Croatia) Ante Vrban (executed) (Independent State of Croatia) Josip Tomljenović (executed) (Independent State of Croatia) Rafael Boban † (Independent State of Croatia) Božidar Kavran (executed) (Independent State of Croatia) Vladimir Kren (executed) (Independent State of Croatia) Vladimir Sabolović (executed) (Independent State of Croatia) Erich Lisak (executed) (Independent State of Croatia) Jasan Biber (executed) (Independent State of Croatia) Božidar Petračic (executed) (Independent State of Croatia) Mimo Rosandić (executed)

Strength
unknown	(Independent State of Croatia) over 2,000

Casualties and losses
(Socialist Federal Republic of Yugoslavia) 48 killed (Socialist Federal Republic of Yugoslavia) 14 wounded	(Independent State of Croatia) 1,919 killed and captured (Independent State of Croatia) 2,000 arrested

Crusader tactics included the assassination of Yugoslav Communist officials, Communist Party members and Yugoslav soldiers; disarming of Yugoslav soldiers and police; robbing of the supporters of the communist government, attacks on collectives, the destruction of state property and the disruption of transport.

The new communist government in Yugoslavia started to focus on the Crusaders in July 1945. They feared the possibility that this group could bring the return of the "60,000 Ustaše who are waiting from Venice to Trieste". The Yugoslav government declared an amnesty in August and September 1945. Large number of Crusaders responded. This amnesty was extended to everyone except Ustaše, members of the Cossack Cavalry Corps, supporters of Dimitrije Ljotić (ljotićevci), NDH officers who commanded units of battalion size or larger, informers, members of the Kulturbund and all those who had escaped Yugoslavia.

Violent methods had priority. Formation of warrant section was common, they would block the terrain to form ambushes. The Yugoslav Department for the Protection of the People (OZNA) installed special groups dressed as Crusaders and agents into Crusader units. Installed OZNA members would bring Crusader groups with their groups (other installed OZNA groups). Crusaders were offered amnesty if they assisted in detection, capture and killing of their comrades. According to varied testimony, those guarantees were not honoured. In 1946 and 1947, OZNA started to act in concert with local inhabitants. Many Crusaders were summarily executed as an example to others. Those who were tried were sentenced to long imprisonment, while leaders of Crusader groups were punished with death. The most dramatic conviction was the deportation of the family of some Crusaders and their sympathizers, or entire villages. The places where OZNA moved them were mostly Adriatic islands. Members of Crusader families were also confined in prisons or camps.

The coordinated activities of OZNA, The Corps of People's Defence of Yugoslavia (KNOJ) and the Yugoslav People's Army (JNA) in winter of 1945/46 large number of Crusaders who enlisted fugitives from prisons and camps was destroyed. In 1946, Crusaders became stronger in northern Croatia, while in south their power was decreasing. The Yugoslav authorities were torn between wishing to eliminate the Crusaders and their refusal to admit that they were forced to take the Crusaders seriously. In the press and on radio, the Crusaders were almost never mentioned. They were only mentioned during the trials of Crusaders or trial of Alojzije Stepinac. In March 1946 the leader of the Chetniks, Draža Mihailović was captured. In July of the same year, president of the Government of the People's Republic of Croatia, Vladimir Bakarić stated that they would destroy the guerrillas within a month if the Crusaders weren't helped by Austria and Italy.

During 1946 the Crusaders launched a few large attacks. One took place on the Velebit mountain where 10 JNA soldiers were killed. This attack is considered the most successful Crusader attack. Against this, 840 Crusaders was killed in this year and only 540 remained in service in Croatia.

The Yugoslav government invested great efforts to renew residential buildings and communications. Communist Party organisations, charged to prevent the spread of defeatism and demoralisation, still reported conflicts between Croats and Serbs. Communists were worried about the small number of Croats in the Communist Party. During the first three years of its rule, the Communist Party eliminated all possible opposition and their opponents' leaders were imprisoned.

By 1947, almost every Crusader group was destroyed and 836 Crusaders were killed or captured. In that year Crusaders killed 38 people, of whom 5 were soldiers, and wounded 14 people, of whom 2 were soldiers. Crusaders recruitment was between 10 and 15. About 2,000 of the most active collaborators of the Crusaders were captured. Ustashas in exiles in Austria and Italy spread exaggerated reports on numbers and activities of Crusaders. Conditions in Croatia in mid 1947 was described in reports by Ustaše Officers Ljubo Miloš and Ante Vrban. They illegally entered Yugoslavia from Austria with the intent to unite Crusader groups. They reported of "overwhelming support for them for the population and that Croatia and Croatian emigration will soon lead to separate worlds if nothing was done". However, UDBA soon captured both Vrban and Miloš and used them to lure senior officers and politicians back in the country by sending false information, so they can arrest them.

At the beginning of July 1948 no guerrilla group was mentioned in Yugoslav records. Information that there were still 67 guerrilla soldiers was ignored since most of them were inactive. In one document it was reported that in 1948, 243 Crusaders were killed, captured or surrendered. Without the support of the people, the Crusaders were demoralized and surrendered. The survivors turned to crime. Communist leaders continued to equate the HSS and the Catholic clergy with the Crusaders. The British Ambassador reported that the number of guerrilla personnel had decreased to a few hundred in February 1950.

Though there was an attempt at founding a new Crusader group in 1952 near Našice, it was clear that their existence as an active movement was at its end. Eventually, remaining members of the Crusaders either surrendered or went into hiding, some remaining underground as long as the mid 1960s. With the end of the Crusaders, the last sign of armed Ustaše resistance to Communism in Croatia vanished.

The leader of the Crusaders was a former Croatian general, Vjekoslav Luburić, and possibly also Rafael Boban, which he is rumoured to fought with the Crusaders until 1947 when he died.

Although the Communist government of the Socialist Federal Republic of Yugoslavia, especially through the Department for the Protection of the People (OZNA) Department of State Security (UDBA) fought against the Crusaders and their sympathizers mercilessly, some level of armed resistance to the Yugoslav government by Croatian nationalists continued long after the end of WWII. Activities included individual actions but also more complex attacks like the 1972 introduction of the Bugojno group as well as attacks abroad like the 1971 Yugoslav Embassy shooting at Sweden and the subsequent hijacking of Scandinavian Airlines System Flight 130.

== See also ==
- Anti-Soviet partisans
- Forest Brothers

== Sources ==
- Dizdar, Zdravko (December 2005). "Prilog istraživanju problema Bleiburga i križnih putova (u povodu 60. obljetnice)" [An addition to the research of the problem of Bleiburg and the Way of the Cross (dedicated to their 60th anniversary)]. The Review of Senj (in Croatian). 32 (1). Senj, Croatia: City Museum Senj - Senj Museum Society: 117–193. ISSN 0582-673X.
- Hajdarović, Miljenko (8 March 2007). "Formiranje gerile – križara". Hrvatski Povijesni Portal (in Croatian). ISSN 1846-4432. Archived from the original on 2021-04-20.
