= Militia (Yugoslavia) =

Law enforcement agency in Yugoslavia

Militia of SFR Yugoslavia Milicija SFR Jugoslavije / Милиција СФР Југославије
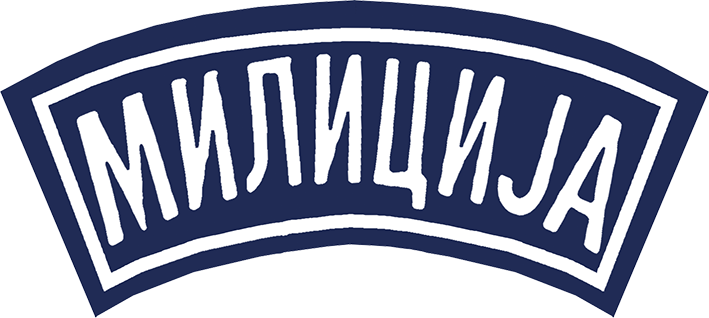
- Common name: Serbo-Croatian: Milicija / Милиција

Agency overview
- Formed: 1944
- Preceding agency: People's Defence Corps of Yugoslavia (KNOJ)
- Dissolved: 1992

Jurisdictional structure
- National agency: SFR Yugoslavia
- Operations jurisdiction: SFR Yugoslavia
- Location map of SFR Yugoslavia
- Area: 255,804 km2 (98,766 sq mi)
- Population: 23,229,846 (1991 estimate)
- General nature: Civilian police

Operational structure
- Overseen by: Federal Executive Council; Republican and provincial executive councils
- Headquarters: Belgrade, SR Serbia
- Parent agency: Federal Secretariat of Internal Affairs; Republican and provincial secretariats of internal affairs

Notables
- Anniversary: Security Day, 13 May

The Militia of SFR Yugoslavia (Serbo-Croatian: Milicija SFR Jugoslavije / Милиција СФР Југославије) was a law enforcement agency of the Socialist Federal Republic of Yugoslavia from 1944 to 1992. The Militia was subordinated to the Federal Secretariat of Internal Affairs (Serbo-Croatian: Savezni sekretarijat unutrašnjih poslova / Савезни секретаријат унутрашњих послова).

Formed during World War II in Yugoslavia on territories controlled by the Yugoslav Partisans, at different times it was named Partisan Guard, Peasant Guard, People's Defence etc. In 1944 it was named People's Militia, and in 1966 Militia.

== Overview ==
The duties of the Militia included protecting the life and personal liberty of citizens, public and private property, maintaining public order and peace, public safety, preventing violations of public order, investigating criminal cases and neutralizing criminals, as well as other duties provided by Yugoslav laws. The Militia was armed with high-quality small arms and equipped with the latest technical equipment and uniforms. The organization of the Militia and the activities of its employees complied with the principles of workers' self-management.

Unlike the Yugoslavia's military, the Yugoslav People's Army (JNA), the Militia was organized in a decentralized way, on a territorial basis. The structure of the Militia formations was as follows: branch – sector – platoon – company – battalion – detachment – brigade. The Militia carried out cooperation with the JNA and its military police; in the event of war, the Militia was part of the Territorial Defense.

== History ==
On 13 May 1944 the Department for Protection of the People (OZNA) was established, and on 15 August 1944, the People's Defence Corps of Yugoslavia (KNOJ) was formed, which represented operational units of OZNA. Until the breakup of Yugoslavia in the early 1990s, 13 May was commemorated as the Security Day. The training of first members of the Militia began immediately after the liberation of Belgrade: initially, the officers of the Militia patrolled the streets, served as guards and guides, and they were assigned goals and objectives by members of the KNOJ and the commanders of the Yugoslav Army. The officers of the Militia did not have their own form, the only sign of difference was a stripe in the form of the flag of Yugoslavia with the words "NM" on the red star.

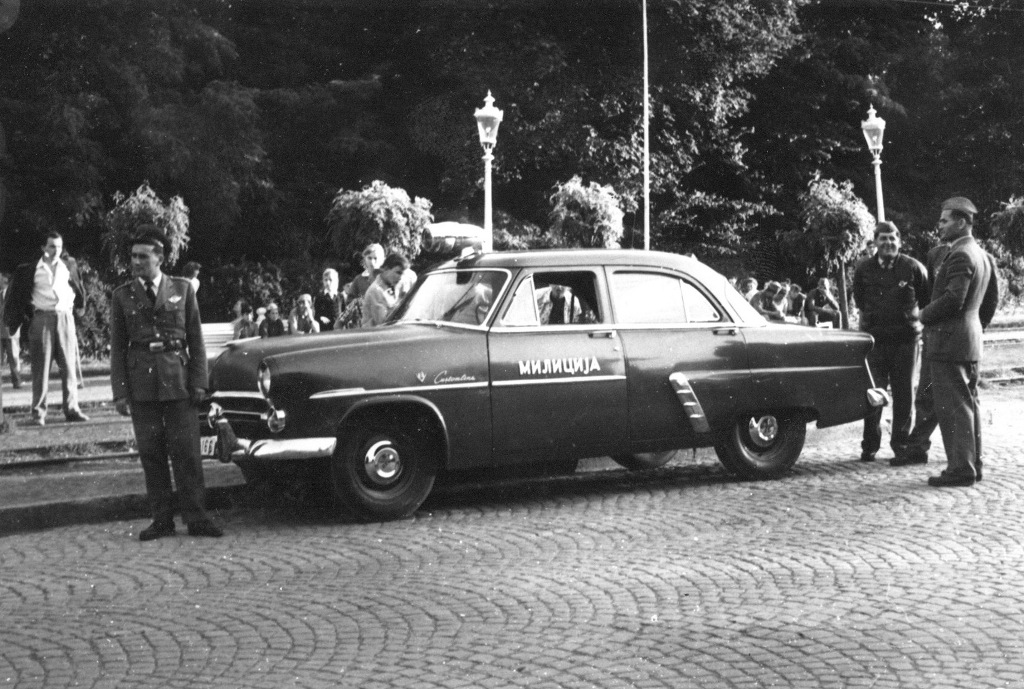
A People's Militia 1952 Ford Customline, 1959

According to the 1946 Yugoslav Constitution, the Federal Ministry of the Interior was composed of the People's Militia Directorate, the People's Militia Command, the Public Security Directorate and the State Security Service. After the transfer of OZNA to the Federal Ministry of Internal Affairs, the Directorate for State Security (UDBA) was formed. The military structure, uniform form and military ranks were approved. The constitutional reforms of 1953 meant the formal renaming of ministries to the secretariats, and so the Federal Secretariat of the Internal Affairs and the republic-level secretariats of the internal affairs appeared.

In the course of the demilitarization of the Federal Secretariat, UDBA ceased to be a militarized unit, the operational units of the KNOJ were disbanded, and their tasks fell on the border guard units the Yugoslav People's Army and the People's Militia. In the People's Militia, the system of insignia changed, the officers were allowed to wear civilian clothes outside the service, and service numbers were depicted on a nickel-plated badge. Equipment and weapons were diverse: the officers used both captured and lend-leased equipment.

In 1956, the first Law on the Organs of Internal Affairs was adopted in the framework of decentralization. A significant part of internal affairs was placed at the disposal of autonomous republics and administrative-territorial units. The 1963 Yugoslav Constitution and the Basic Law on the Service for Internal Affairs of 1964 continued the process of decentralization, forming the basic organs of internal affairs at the municipal level.

After the Brijuni plenum of the Central Committee of the League of Communists of Yugoslavia in 1966, at which Aleksandar Ranković (Vice President of Yugoslavia and former Federal Minister of the Interior) was dismissed from his posts, a new Basic Law on Internal Affairs was adopted. This led to the breaking of the entire unified system of state security of SFR Yugoslavia. From then on, the Public Security Service and the State Security Service were engaged in internal affairs.

The first group consisted of the People's Militia, in charge of fight against crime, traffic security and the protection of borders. The People's Militia began to be called simply the Militia, and after a series of changes in personnel and organization, the Militia became part of the Public Security Service. Stripped of its military status, European-styled police ranks were later adopted for the republican force. The first version of the ranks were corresponding to the functions and responsibilities of rank holders.

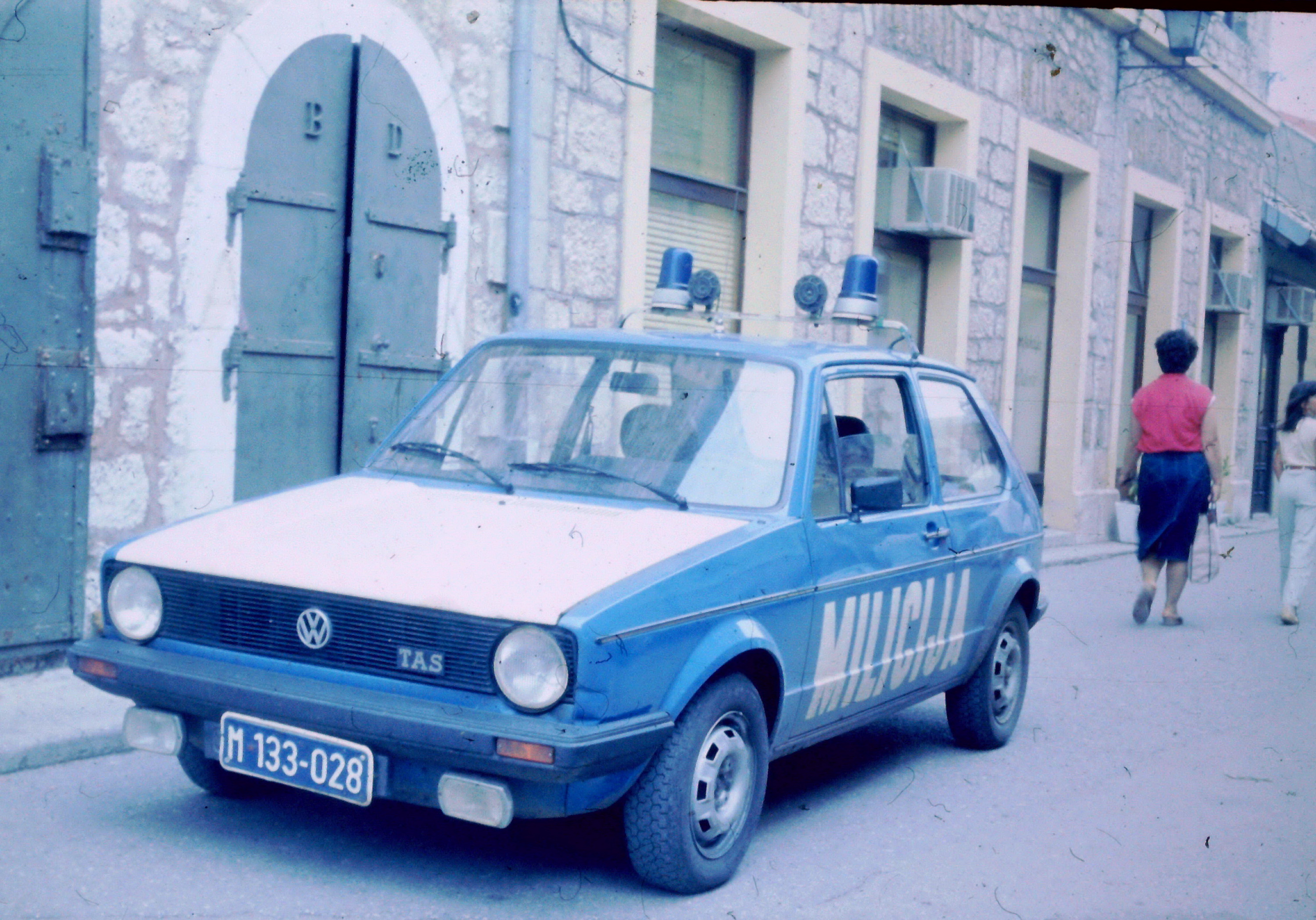
A Yugoslav Militia VW Golf I parked on a street in Mostar, Bosnia and Herzegovina, 1985

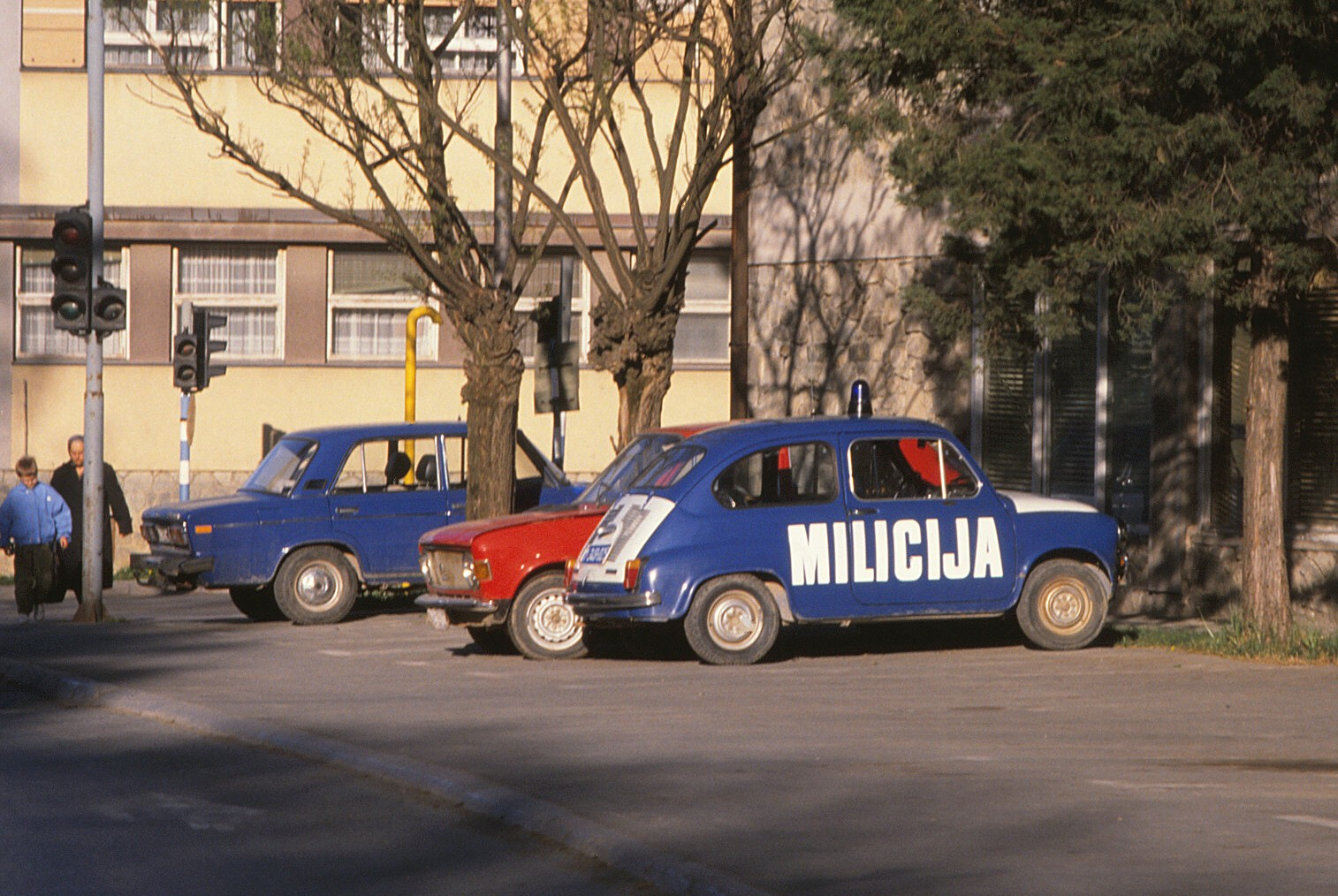
A Yugoslav Militia Zastava 750/850 on a parking lot, 1989

After the 1971 amendments to the Constitution, adoption of the 1974 Yugoslav Constitution and new laws the process of decentralization of the Militia stopped. The republican and provincial secretariats were engaged in equipment and armament. The bodies of SAP Vojvodina and SAP Kosovo worked on the basis of provincial laws, although both regions were part of SR Serbia. Unlike other security services, whose responsibility included only republics and provinces, the public security services acted in the concept of public self-defense and a fragmented security system.

In essence, relations between the federal, republican and provincial departments of the Federal Ministry of Internal Affairs were based on the principles of agreements, assistance and cooperation in work, and not on hierarchical principles with subordination. Such a decentralized system with non-professional elements in 1972 showed all its weakness, when a CRB diversionary group (known as the Bugojno group) penetrated the Yugoslav territory. In this regard, in 1972, 1977 and 1979 laws were passed on the formation of militarized police task forces and the first special forces of the Federal Ministry of Internal Affairs. In this regard, the former rank insignia corresponding to the functions and responsibilities were replaced with a new police rank system.

Differences in funding and decentralization led to large differences in the organization of the Militia and the organs of the Federal Ministry of Internal Affairs. At the federal level there was the Federal Ministry of Internal Affairs. At the republican and provincial levels there were, respectively, republican and provincial secretariats of internal affairs. At the regional level (depending on whether it was a republic or a province) there were different bodies: the Secretariat of Internal Affairs, the Joint Secretariat of Internal Affairs, the Inter-municipal Secretariat of Internal Affairs, the Center of Public Security and the Center of Security. At the municipal level, depending on the size of the municipality, there were the Department of Internal Affairs, the station of Militia, the branch of Militia, etc.

As a result of the breakup of Yugoslavia in 1991–92 and the start of the Yugoslav Wars, the unified Militia of SFR Yugoslavia ceased to exist and separate police forces were established in each of the former Yugoslav republics.

== Rank structure ==
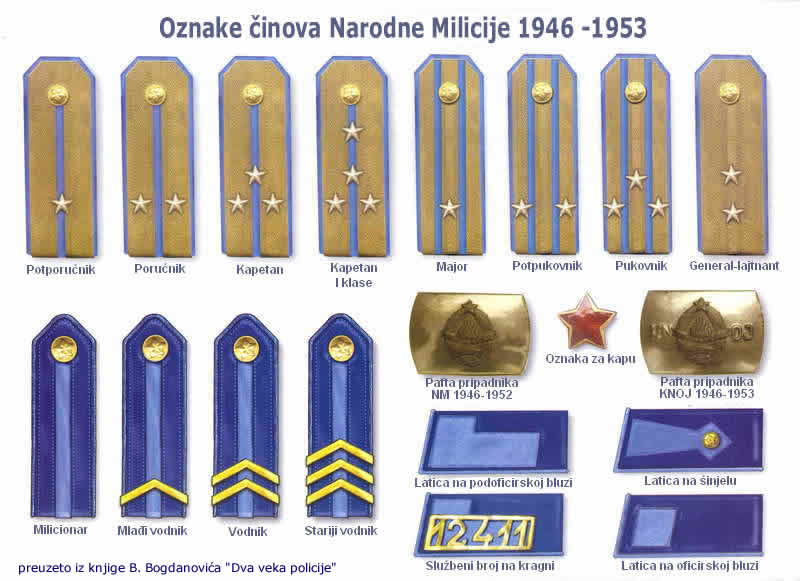
Structure in 1946–1953

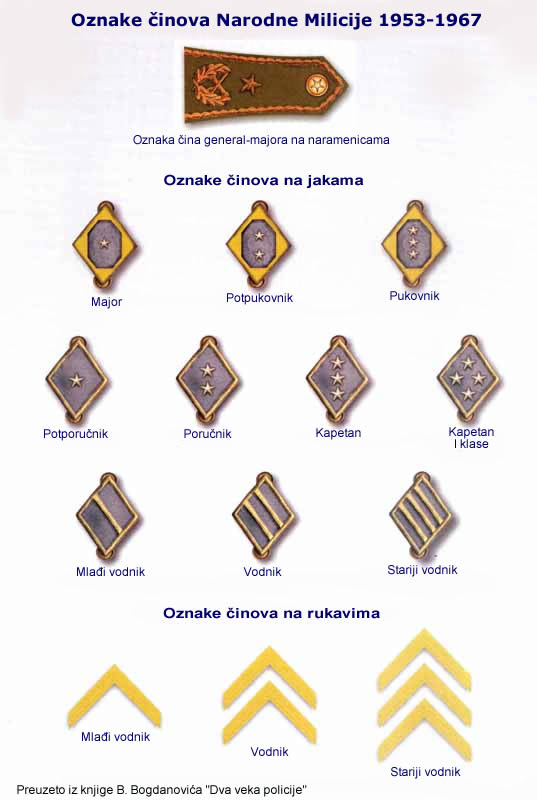
Structure in 1953–1967

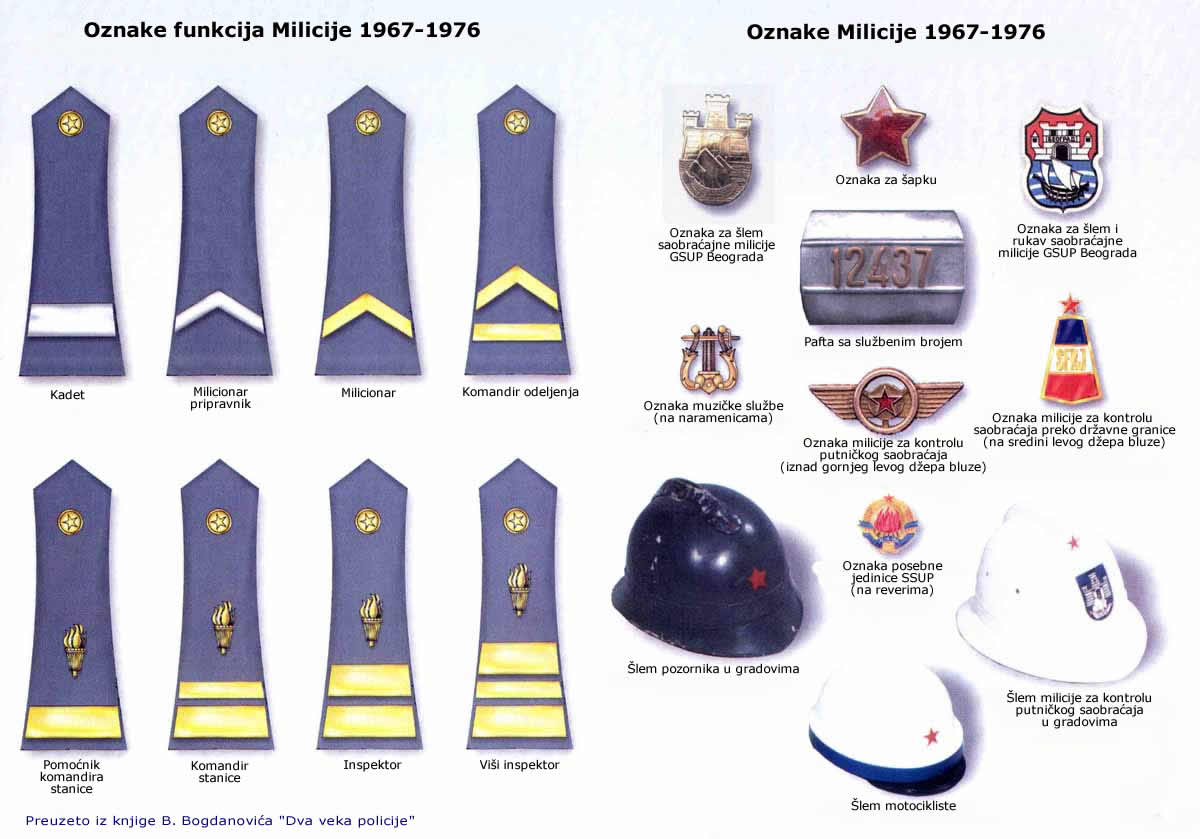
Structure in 1967–1976

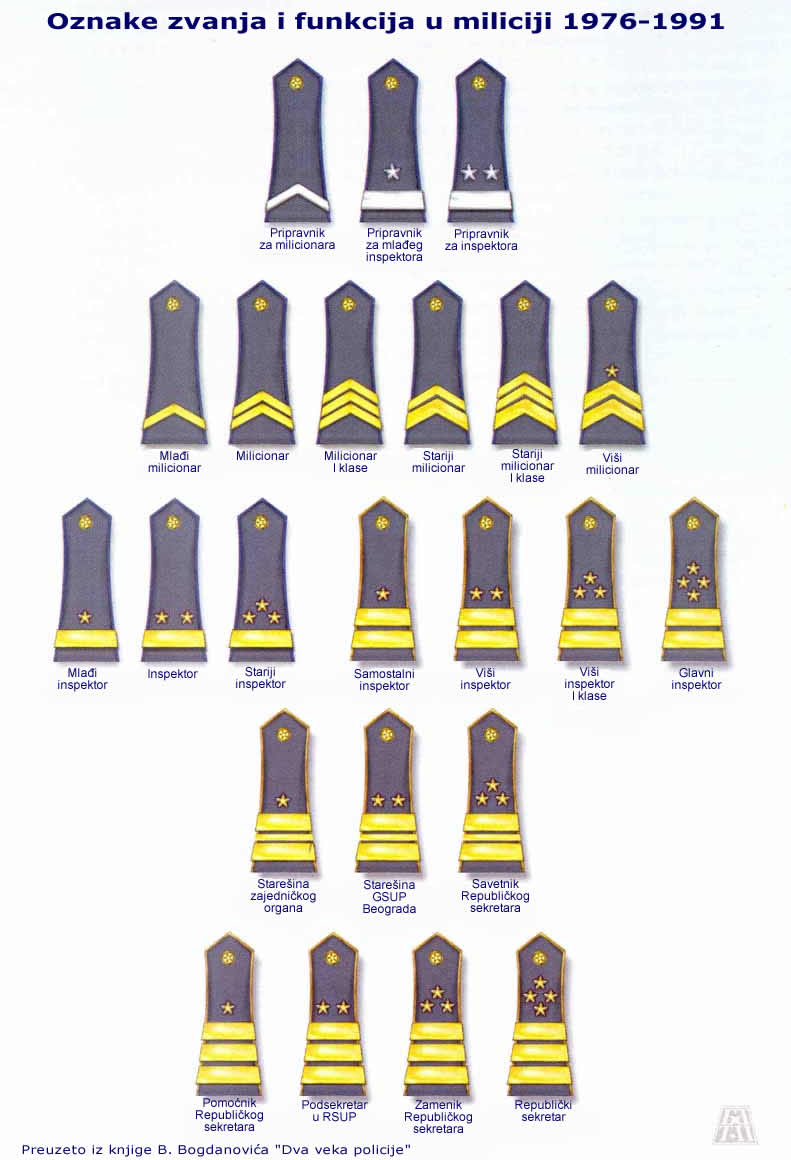
Structure in 1976–1991

== See also ==
- Law enforcement in Bosnia and Herzegovina
  - Bosnian police
  - Police of Republika Srpska
- Police of North Macedonia
- Police of Serbia
  - Kosovo Police
- Slovenian National Police Force
- Law enforcement in Croatia
- Law enforcement in Montenegro

== Bibliography ==
- Ratković, Borislav (1981). Petar Petrović (ed.). Vojni leksikon (in Serbo-Croatian). Belgrade: Vojni zavod.
- Branko Bogdanović (2002). Dva veka policije u Srbiji. Belgrade: Ministry of Internal Affairs.
