= Dara of Jasenovac =

2021 Serbian film

- Official movie poster
- Directed by: Predrag Antonijević
- Written by: Nataša Drakulić
- Produced by: Predrag Antonijević; Maksa Ćatović; Petar Vukašinović
- Starring: Biljana Čekić; Vuk Kostić; Marko Janketić
- Cinematography: Miloš Kodemo
- Edited by: Filip Dedić
- Music by: Roman Goršek; Aleksandra Kovač
- Production companies: Dandelion Production Inc; Film Danas; Komuna; Cineplanet
- Distributed by: MegaCom Film; 101 Studios (US)
- Release dates: 5 February 2021 (United States); 20 February 2021 (TV Premiere); 22 April 2021 (Serbia)
- Running time: 130 minutes
- Country: Serbia
- Languages: Serbian; Croatian
- Budget: $3,6 million
- Box office: $52,786

Dara of Jasenovac (Serbian: Дара из Јасеновца, romanized: Dara iz Jasenovca) is a 2021 Serbian historical drama film directed by Predrag Antonijević. Based on the testimonies of survivors, it deals with war crimes and atrocities that took place at Jasenovac concentration camp, which was a part of the Holocaust and the wider genocide of Serbs in the Independent State of Croatia.

The film was set to premiere in early 2020, commemorating 75 years since the escape of the remaining prisoners from the camp. Due to the COVID-19 pandemic, the premiere was postponed to 22 October 2020, and then further on to early 2021. It was selected as the Serbian entry for the Best International Feature Film at the 93rd Academy Awards, although it was not nominated. It was also eligible for Best Picture but it did not make the shortlist. Dara of Jasenovac has been submitted for consideration for the Golden Globe Award for Best Motion Picture – Drama, while young actress Biljana Čekić was submitted for consideration for the Golden Globe Award for Best Actress in a Motion Picture – Drama. It is the first Serbian production on the subject of the Jasenovac camp.

The film was met with mixed reviews from international critics. Positive reviews praised the film for dealing with a lesser-known episode of World War II that gets little to no coverage from the international public, while negative reviews accused it of playing a role in the Serbian government's nationalist propaganda aims.

== Plot ==
After the Axis-led Kozara Offensive, the majority of the local Serb population ends up in Ustaše and Nazi German concentration camps in the Independent State of Croatia.

Families are marched towards cattle cars. Ten-year old Dara Ilić marches alongside her older brother Jovo and asks him why others are not being rounded up as well when they look the same. A woman marching in the column of prisoners carries her crying baby and makes eye contact with one of the young Croatian peasant women working the fields. She decides to leave the baby with her before returning to the column.

At a train station adorned with the Nazi German flag, Father Miroslav Filipović separates the sick and elderly from the rest, who are forced into the cattle cars. Dara watches as those who are left behind are shot and killed by Filipović. With no information about the whereabouts of her father, the train transports Dara, her mother and two brothers to the Jasenovac concentration camp. In an undisclosed location nearby, Dara's father Mile is tasked with removing and disposing of dead bodies.

That night at the camp, the guards devise a game of musical chairs as entertainment for visiting German Nazi officers. Each prisoner who loses each round has their throat slashed with a srbosjek or is bludgeoned by a hammer, which Dara witnesses.

As families are separated, Dara's mother struggles and refuses to hand over her older son. They are both shot and killed by Ante Vrban. Dara is left to take care of her younger brother as they are sent to a special camp for women and children. She makes it her personal mission and goal to ensure the survival of her younger brother.

With the help of a Jewish prisoner, Blankica, Dara plots a path to escape.

== Cast ==
- Biljana Čekić as Dara Ilić
- Vuk Kostić as Miroslav Filipović
- Marko Janketić as Vjekoslav Luburić
- Igor Đorđević as Ante Vrban
- Martina Kitanović as Maja Buždon
- Nataša Drakulić as Jovanka Končar
- Bojan Žirović as Jaša
- Nikolina Jelisavac as Mileva
- Alisa Radaković as Nada Šakić
- Jelena Grujičić as Blankica
- Sanja Moravčić as Diana Budisavljević
- Zlatan Vidović as Mile Ilić
- Nataša Ninković as Radojka
- Anja Stanić as Nada Ilić
- Nikolina Friganović as Mileva
- Radoslav Milenković as A Man

== Production ==
An old brickyard located in the village of Kolut near Sombor was reconstructed and turned into a camp by production designer Goran Joksimović. The second part of the movie was shot in Bela Crkva.

Children from Kozarska Dubica were chosen to portray numerous children who were imprisoned in the camp. Scenes with the children were shot in sequence in order to mask the growth of children over the three months of shooting and so that those young actors would better understand the material. A psychologist was kept on the set.

A number of actors from Republika Srpska took part in the project, joined by their colleagues from Serbia.

Dara in Jasenovac was supported by Ministry of Culture and Information and Film Center Serbia.

American scholar Michael Berenbaum served as history consultant and executive producer.

The Serbian premiere took place in Gračanica and the movie was screened for seven days.

101 Studios secured the U.S. rights for the film.

While several movies were filmed during the existence of Yugoslavia, this is the first movie in Serbian production on the subject of the Jasenovac concentration camp.

== Release ==
The film's American distributor 101 Studios released it in the United States on 5 February 2021. The film was originally set to be released in early 2020 to commemorate the 75th anniversary of the escape of prisoners from the camp but was pushed back to October and postponed a second time due to the COVID-19 pandemic. It is set to be released in Serbia on 22 April 2021.

The film had its world television premiere on 20 February 2021 on Radio Television of Serbia (RTS). It was watched by 2,650,000 viewers, representing 50.3% of the total viewership share in Serbia.

== Reaction ==
Part of the Croatian media complained about the Croatian Audiovisual Centre (HAVC)'s lack of investment in historical films, in contrast to Film Center Serbia (FCS), and blamed HAVC because a film that "depicts Croats as bad", with Vjekoslav Luburić being one of its main characters, was going to be distributed worldwide. However, they praised Antonijević and Drakulić, referring to the pair as "a quality director and a quality screenwriter" respectively, as well as praising the film production.

Due to coordinated review bombings on IMDb, either with the highest or the lowest number of stars, IMDb temporarily disabled the rating option for the film in February 2021.

Historian Rory Yeomans argued that the film "isn't anti-Croat propaganda" but that it is "a serious attempt to portray fascist oppression", though he agreed that anti-Catholic bias could be argued. Yeomans disputes the characterizations made by negative reviews and writes that "there is little evidence of a nationalist agenda" in the film, citing as an example a scene early on where a Croatian woman saves a baby, thus making a distinction between ordinary Croats from the Ustashas. He also notes that the film's focus on Serb women and children is a reflection of the fact that most of the prisoners in Stara Gradiška were ethnic Serbs. Although some elements of the film were fictionalized and the portrayal of guards is "sometimes-cartoonish", he praises the performances of the actors.

Historian Dubravka Stojanović stated that Antonijević's movie is "historically selective" as "except for one woman and a small group of Roma, the film does not show that, in addition to Serbs, Roma, Jews and anti-fascist Croats were [also] killed en masse in Jasenovac". According to Stojanović, the film is reminiscent of Partisan propaganda films which "portrayed only Partisan fighters as victims, and not civilians". She concludes that "the selection of victims is not only a forgery of history, but also a dangerous game with history".

Jovan Byford, author of Picturing Genocide in the Independent State of Croatia, criticized the instrumentalization of the atrocities in the Jasenovac camp by the state of Serbia in the context of its geopolitical antagonism with the state of Croatia. The film, according to Byford, often invoked clichés which argue that even the Nazis were horrified by the brutality of the Ustashas in order to highlight that Jasenovac was "worse than Auschwitz, and therefore the Serbs have actually suffered a lot more than Jews".

Sonja Biserko, the founder and president of the Helsinki Committee for Human Rights in Serbia, stated that Dara of Jasenovac is "an instrument used to depict Serbs as exclusive victims, to deny everything that happened during the nineties and, in some way, to justify what happened back then", adding that it is "tragic that the victims of Jasenovac are degraded in this way." She also concluded that the film was a response to Quo Vadis, Aida?. Biserko's statements were prompted by Predrag Antonijević's appearance in the talk show Dobro jutro Srbijo on Happy TV where he mocked the victims of the Omarska concentration camp together with the host Milomir Marić.

Porfirije, Serbian Patriarch, stated that the movie should not be a cause for holding grudges and that "everyone can check the stance of their heart and pray to the Lord that nothing like that ever happens again". He further stated that it is important to speak about Jasenovac.

== Reception ==
=== Critical response ===
The film was met with mixed reviews from international media. On Rotten Tomatoes, it holds an approval rating of 57% based on 23 reviews, with an average rating of 6.3/10.

Jay Weissberg of Variety gave the film a negative review. Weissberg questioned the producers' motives and wrote that the film contained "undisguised anti-Croatian and anti-Catholic elements" which are "designed as incendiary fodder" for current conflicts, and that it lacks any serious examination of the dangers of nationalism, racism and genocide which are instead replaced with "cheap sensation and sentiment". Weissberg's review provoked a reaction from the film's director Predrag Antonijević and executive producer Michael Berenbaum, the President of the Board of Directors of Film Center of Serbia Jelena Trivan, representatives of the film's distributor, MegaCom, Serbian Minister of Internal Affairs Aleksandar Vulin, and Serbian Minister of Culture and Information Maja Gojković, among others. Antonijević dubbed Weisberg's critique as a political "pamphlet" rather than a movie review as it contained "only two or three sentences about the film itself". Berenbaum disputed Weissberg's anti-Croatian and anti-Catholic charges as "nonsense", stressing the film's factual adherence to camp testimonials and that if someone thinks the story is political, "that's [them] bringing it to the story". Meanwhile, Weissberg—who is Jewish himself—claimed that he received online antisemitic abuse in a campaign directed at him by Vulin. Highlighting Vulin's close relationship with the widow of Slobodan Milošević, Weissberg stated, "This is a man who has certainly condoned a genocide who is turning around and calling me a Holocaust denier".

Writing for Film Threat, Ray Lobo reviewed the film positively, noting that it is "a unique World War II story worth watching" and serves as a "World War II education" as well as an "education in the Balkan conflicts of the last decade of the twentieth century". Lobo praises the film's production quality and lighting as well as the cast for effectively conveying "both the degradation of camp life and the will to live".

In The Jewish Chronicle, Linda Marric rated the film two stars out of five, stating that the film "often feels needlessly gratuitous... as though the film takes pleasure in depicting these atrocities in every lurid detail". She states that "the film often descends into nationalistic and anti-Croat fervor" but praised the film's technical quality and the "beautifully understated performance" of actress Biljana Čekić.

In his review, Robert Abele of Los Angeles Times echoed some of Weissberg's sentiments, calling the film "nativist and manipulative", remarking that "it smacks of scoring points in a longstanding regional feud". Abele went on to state that, "when there's a scene in which the visiting Nazi bristles at the display of one-on-one sadism toward Serbian prisoners from his crisply uniformed Croatian hosts (which include incestuous brother and sister officers), you know you're in agenda territory." He criticised Antonijević's "use of a fantasy element for every death" as "off-putting" but complimented the performances of the actors who portrayed the brutalized prisoners. Antonijević told the Nova S internet portal that he intended to sue the Los Angeles Times over this review, on the grounds that it denied the genocide of Serbs during World War II.

Cynthia Vinney of Comic Book Resources described Dara of Jasenovac as one of the Holocaust films that "exist for cynical reasons." She went on to describe the film's depiction of violence as comical and straining credulity, as well as that it has a "sickening effect of making the Nazis momentarily sympathetic." She concluded that the film signals an agenda born out of current animosities between Serbia and Croatia, and that it is a "tragic story with no nuance or insight beyond the horror."

Anna Smith of Deadline Hollywood commented that it is hard not to be struck by the horror on display, despite some heavy-handed moments. Joe Friar of The Victoria Advocate hails Biljana Čekić's performance as "very realistic and natural" and praises the film for dealing with a "rarely-seen chapter of WWII", but called the reenactments "inflated", and said that as a "dramatic work of fiction based on actual events, the exaggerated tone detracts from the overall message.

Serbian and Yugoslav film director Đorđe Kadijević considers that the film was made with the best intentions and that "no fuss should be made about it". He claims that the film is not fully presenting the vast proportion of tragedy which took place in Jasenovac camp. Kadijević also criticized the concept of the film's dramaturgy, naivety of some scenes and the lack of positive Croatian characters.

== See also ==
- List of submissions to the 93rd Academy Awards for Best International Feature Film
- List of Serbian submissions for the Academy Award for Best International Feature Film
