= Veselin Vukotić (criminal) =

Montenegrin criminal and hitman

Veselin "Vesko" Vukotić (born 12 February 1958) is a Montenegrin criminal and hitman. He was arrested in February 2006 and released from jail in August 2009.

== Criminal activity ==
Vukotić is best known as one of the assassins of Enver Hadri, a Kosovo-Albanian human rights activist, accused by Yugoslav State Security Service as a CIA and KGB agent. On February 25, 1990, Hadri was shot by Vukotić, Andrija Lakonić, and Darko Ašanin (all employed and contracted by Yugoslav State Security Service (SDB) at the time) in the Belgian capital Brussels. It is thought that the assassination was ordered by the Yugoslav secret service.

Later that year Vukotić killed Lakonić at Nana nightclub in Belgrade's neighbourhood of Senjak in the presence of Ašanin and Serbian police inspector Miroslav Bižić. The very next day after the murder, Vukotić escaped to the United States with help from inspector Bižić. Both Ašanin and Bižić were later murdered.

Despite arrest warrants, Vukotić continued traveling, spending most of his time in Montenegro. On November 16, 1997, during a shooting at the Flash nightclub in Prčanj near Kotor, Montenegro, he murdered sailor Duško Bošković and wounded Vladimir Pavićević.

== Arrest and subsequent events ==
=== Arrest ===
Vukotić was arrested in late February 2006 by Spanish police at the Barajas Airport in Madrid after landing there on a flight from Paris. At the time he traveled with a forged Croatian passport and driver's license issued to the name Ludvig Bulić. It is thought that the arrest was made as a result of a tip by Montenegrin police to their French counterparts who in turn extended the information to Spain. The basis for Vukotić's arrest was a 16-year-old arrest warrant issued by the Belgian police for Hadri's murder as well as the arrest warrant for Bošković's murder.

There was talk that the International Criminal Tribunal for the former Yugoslavia (ICTY) showed interest in having Vukotić as a witness at the trial of Slobodan Milošević since several witnesses mentioned Vukotić's name in their testimonies, but nothing ever came of it.

=== Imprisonment ===
Spanish authorities extradited Vukotić to Belgium where he spent more than two years in prison in Saint-Gilles. On December 18, 2008 Belgian authorities extradited him to Serbia under heavy security, because he had Serbian citizenship. He was kept in District jail (Okružni zatvor) in Novi Sad for less than a year.

=== Release ===
In August 2009, he suffered a heart attack and later was released to freedom for medical treatment. Vukotić was arrested again on December 31, 2010 by local Serbian police, but was released to freedom a few hours later, on the same evening.
