= Operation Gvardijan =

Yugoslavian anti-terrorist operation (1947-1948)

Operation Gvardijan was a covert action of the Yugoslav Directorate for State Security (UDBA) from 1947 and 1948. It prevented an attempt by Ustasha emigrants to carry out terrorist and diversionary actions in Yugoslavia and unite anti-communist Crusaders in the country, in an uprising against the new authorities.

Infiltration of the Ustashas (called Operation April 10 (Note: April 10 was anniversary of proclamation of Independent State of Croatia)) was initiated with the consent of Ante Pavelić (after its failure, he distanced himself from it). The action was led by Božidar Kavran. The first group was arrested on Mount Papuk. UDBA launched Operation Gvardijan to lure the escaped Ustashas by sending false messages, during which a total of 19 Ustasha groups were arrested. The operation ended with Kavran's arrest. The Ustashas were tried in August 1948. Most were sentenced to death, while others were sent to prison. A total of 96 Ustashas were arrested, killed, or executed including former concentration camp commandants Ante Vrban and Ljubo Miloš.

== History ==
With the defeat of the Independent State of Croatia and the withdrawal of its army in Austria in May 1945, scattered groups of soldiers in Yugoslavia escaped capture. They called themselves crusaders. By 1946, the anti-communist Croats, mostly former Ustashas or high-ranking members of Croatian Home Guard, connected enough to consider a revolt. They knew of the existence of crusaders, but they had no direct link to the emigrants. The emigrants sent their men to Yugoslavia to inform them about the situation. Ustasha Major Ante Vrban returned from exile in the summer of 1945 and arrived near Zagreb. Ante Pavelić and colonel Jakov Džal asked Vrban to return to Yugoslavia, which he did in April 1946, returning to Yugoslavia for six months, visiting crusaders in northern Croatia, Bosnia and Herzegovina.

Croatian emigrants abroad spread exaggerated news about the number of crusaders and their struggle against Yugoslav security forces. Hopes of the Ustasha leadership were bolstered by deteriorating relations between Yugoslavia and Western Allies, and between the Soviet Union and Western Allies. It seemed to them that a new world war was inevitable.

In 1946, Lovro Sučić and Božidar Kavran formed a Croatian State Committee in Austria, whose task would be to lead a revolt in the former Independent State of Croatia. The committee prepared groups of officers to infiltrate into Yugoslavia to organize armed groups. Emigrants contacted foreign intelligence services. Anglo-American intelligence services promised that they would supply them with the necessary material, and in return, they were supposed to report on the situation.

Ustasha emigrants in Italy received news of the alleged wide-scale resistance to the new Yugoslavia. They made their own plans for an uprising. This plan was called "Operation April 10". They attempted to enlist the emigrants in Austria. Kavran accepted their participation with disbelief, since the Ustashas in Italy were under the strong influence of Ante Moškov, who was in conflict with Pavelić. When a compromise solution was reached between these two plans, Kavran went to Italy with the pseudonym "Gvardijan" and selected men for this plan within refugee camps. The plan was to connect with the crusaders of Rafael Boban, who were supposed to act somewhere in Bilogora.

Yugoslav security forces (OZNA/UDBA, KNOJ and Yugoslav Army) destroyed many crusader groups, so by 1947 serious resistance had ended.

== Operation ==
Prior to the start of the operation, the bureau for Croatia in Zagreb in May received a communication from Vienna from his main agent among the Ustasha emigrants that the first group would come to Papuk soon. UDBA immediately prepared a response under the secret name Gvardijan, (Note: Croatian: Gvardijan - A superior of Franciscan monastery) Kavran's nom de guerre, and set traps.

Kavran, with the support of other emigrant leadership, sent his first group. He chose former Ustasha mayor Ljubo Miloš (former commander of the Jasenovac concentration camp), mayor Ante Vrban and Luka Grgić. Kavran assured them that they would find supporters of the Croatian Peasant Party. Their task was to organize and connect these groups.

On 7 June, the group crossed the Yugoslav-Hungarian border. Miloš sent a message to Kavran that no crusader group was in the Koprivnica area and that they would go further. After a few days of wandering through Papuk, Dilje, Psunj and Babja Gora, they were convinced that no crusader groups were to be found and returned to Austria. Upon their return on 19 July, they met a UDBA agent who connected with the group, and reported to them about his station. He presented himself as a member of a crusader group of major Mikulčić (whom they personally knew), so they arranged a meeting with him.

Miloš and Vrban started with UDBA members in an improvised camp. While they were resting, the UDBA officer uttered a signal that read "Jozo, bring me water", members of UDBA threw themselves at Miloš and Vrban. Grgić was liquidated later. Vrban and Miloš were transferred to the prison on Savska cesta in Zagreb. Both explained the plans of their colleagues. The Croatian section of UDBA, under the direction of Ivan Krajačić, went into action. He sent Kavran a false message, informing him that the first group on Papuk had been linked to the crusaders, and stressed that no officers were present. The goal was to capture senior officers and prominent politicians.

Kavran sent another group from Austria that crossed Yugoslav-Hungarian border on 20 July. Upon their arrival, UDBA learned from the peasants in the vicinity of Koprivnica and Đurđevac that they had met five suspected rebels. The group was arrested in Suhopolje on 29 July. In the meantime, Miloš stated that as commander of Jasenovac concentration camp, he was responsible for war crimes and agreed to collaborate with UDBA. He gave the code and radio signals and signed written messages.

In the following months, group after group fell into UDBA traps. Route through Hungary was cut, when Hungarian arrested one guides who lead Ustasha through Yugoslav-Hungarian border. So, UDBA arranged new line for infiltration of Ustasahas via Slovenia. Capture of infiltrated groups was continued until summer. Due to worsening Yugoslav-Soviet relations after Tito-Stalin split, UDBA feared that further operation would be in danger, as Soviet intelligence service might knew for infiltration of former Ustasas, and might use as propaganda tool against Yugoslavia. Yugoslavs were certain that Pavelić has left Europe and that he would not return in Yugoslavia, so main objective became Kavran. UDBA lured him by sending him false message requesting his arrival, otherwise his men would run resistance without Kavran's control. The last group on July 3 included Kavran himself, who was immediately arrested. Kavran's arrest ended Operation Gvardijan. On 9 or 10 July 1947, UDBA sent a dispatch to the Ustasha base in Villach, Austria: "We've fucked you over. Full stop. All of your men are in our prisons."

All 96 infiltrators were arrested or killed. In 1948, the courts of the People's Republic of Croatia sentenced 20 of them (including Miloš, Vrban and Kavran) to death by hanging and permanent loss of all rights and 57 to death by shooting, while others were sentenced to life imprisonment or imprisonment ranging from 15 to 20 years.

Together with this group was a group composed of former Colonel of Maček's Croatian Peasant Defense and two former Chetniks. Those three men were gathered in Trieste by former Chetnik Lieutenant Colonel Siniša Ocokoljić. They infiltrated Yugoslavia via the Adriatic Sea, but were arrested.

== List of captured in Operation Gvardijan ==
- Ljubo Miloš, Major in Ustasha Militia, commander of Jasenovac concentration camp. Executed in 1948.
- Ante Vrban, Major in Ustasha Militia, commander in Stara Gradiška concentration camp. Executed in 1948.
- Josip Tomljenović, Lt. Colonel in Ustasha Militia. Executed in 1948.
- Božidar Petračić, Major in Ustasha Militia. Executed in 1948
- Ivica Gržeta, Major. Executed in 1948
- Mimo Rosandić, Colonel and official in Ministry of Forestry during Second World War. Executed in 1948
- Vladimir Sabolić, politician, prefect of Posavje District Second World War, executed in 1948
- Božidar Kavran, executed in 1948.

== See also ==
- Bugojno group

== Sources ==
- Vojinović, Aleksandar (1988). Ante Pavelić. Centar za informacije i publicitet. ISBN 978-86-7125-031-3.
- Krizman, Bogdan (1986). Pavelić u bjekstvu. Zagreb: Globus.
- Adriano, Pino; Cingolani, Giorgio (2 April 2018). Nationalism and Terror: Ante Pavelić and Ustasha Terrorism from Fascism to the Cold War. Central European University Press. ISBN 978-963-386-206-3.
- Tokić, Mate Nikola (15 April 2020). Croatian Radical Separatism and Diaspora Terrorism During the Cold War. Purdue University Press. ISBN 978-1-55753-892-5.
