= Ante Vrban =

Croatian war criminal (1908–1948)

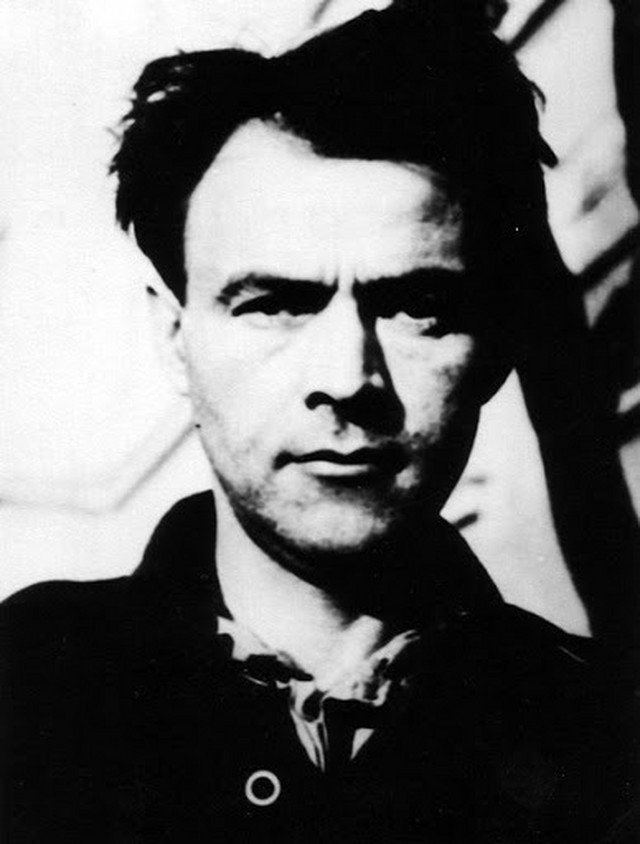
- Born: 15 January 1908; Pejakuša near Gospić, Kingdom of Croatia-Slavonia, Austria-Hungary
- Died: 31 August 1948 (aged 40); Zagreb, PR Croatia, FPR Yugoslavia
- Cause of death: Execution by hanging
- Military career
- Allegiance: Independent State of Croatia
- Branch: Ustaše Militia; Croatian Armed Forces
- Service years: 1941–45
- Commands: Deputy commander of Stara Gradiška concentration camp

Ante Vrban (15 January 1908 – 31 August 1948) was a Croatian major of the Ustaše Militia and later the Croatian Armed Forces of the Independent State of Croatia during World War II. He served as deputy commander of the Stara Gradiška concentration camp and was responsible for various atrocities committed there during the war. After the collapse of the Independent State of Croatia, he fled and sought refuge in Austria. In the summer of 1945, he returned to Yugoslavia with the intention of starting an anti-communist uprising. He was arrested by Yugoslav authorities and charged with war crimes. Vrban was found guilty on all counts and hanged in August 1948.

== Biography ==
Vrban was born on 15 January 1908 in Pejakuša, near Gospić. Before World War II, he worked as a trading assistant.

After the formation of the Independent State of Croatia, he joined the Ustasha Militia. In the summer of 1941, he took part in the killings of Serbs in Lika, as well as in the killings of Jews in the Jadovno concentration camp.

He arrived at the Stara Gradiška camp on 13 November 1941, and brought with him a group of captured Freemasons. For some time he was the deputy commander of the camp which was commanded by Mile Orešković. At the post-war trial, he admitted to poisoning 63 sick children with Zyklon B.

He took part in the Battle of Lijevče Field. After the collapse of the Independent State of Croatia, he withdrew to Austria, but in 1946 he returned briefly to Croatia to establish contact with the Crusaders. The following year, the UDBA captured him on Mount Papuk, together with Ljubo Miloš. At the trial before the Supreme Court of the People's Republic of Croatia with Ustashas caught in Operation Gvardijan, Vrban was sentenced to death by hanging.

== In popular culture ==
In the 1983 four-part TV Zagreb mini-series Zamke (Traps), Vrban is portrayed by Zdenko Jelčić. In the 2021 historical drama Dara of Jasenovac directed by Predrag Antonijević, Vrban is portrayed by Igor Đorđević.

== Sources ==
- Miletić, Antun (1986). Koncentracioni logor Jasenovac 1941-1945: dokumenta. Belgrade: Narodna knjiga. ISBN 9788676240340.
- Peršen, Mirko (1966). Ustaški logori. Zagreb: Stvarnost. ISBN 9788634305470.
- Krizman, Bogdan (1986). Pavelić u bjekstvu. Zagreb: Filip Višnjić. ISBN 9788634301397.
