= Veselin Vukotić =

Veselin Vukotić may refer to:

- Veselin Vukotić (criminal) (born 1958), Montenegrin hitman and criminal, known for murders of Enver Hadri and Andrija Lakonić
- Veselin Vukotić (politician) (born 1949), Montenegrin economist, professor, politician, and co-owner of Donja Gorica University
