= Biljana Čekić =

Serbian actress (born 2007)

- Биљана Чекић
- Born: October 25, 2007 (age 18); Sreflije, Kozarska Dubica, Republika Srpska, Bosnia and Herzegovina
- Occupation: Actress
- Years active: 2021
- Known for: Dara of Jasenovac
- Honours: Order of Karađorđe's Star, Second Class

Biljana Čekić (born 25 October 2007) is a Serbian actress. In 2024, she was awarded the Order of Karađorđe's Star by the Republic of Serbia.

== Life ==
Biljana Čekić was born on 25 October 2007, in the village of Sreflije, in Kozarska Dubica municipality in Republika Srpska, Bosnia and Herzegovina. Her great-grandmother and nine other relatives were imprisoned in the Jasenovac concentration camp. Only her great-grandmother survived.

She had no formal acting training. She became famous for her debut role as Dara Ilić in the film Dara of Jasenovac (2021), a Serbian historical drama film directed by Predrag Antonijević. The film was submitted as Serbia's entry for an Oscar, and a Golden Globe.

In 2021, she received a scholarship from the Archimandrite of the Hilandar Monastery for her role as Dara Ilić.

== Filmography ==
- Dara of Jasenovac (2021)
