= People's Defence Corps of Yugoslavia =

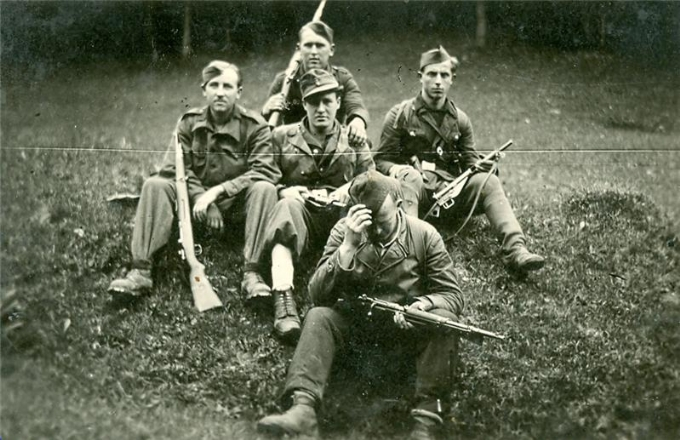
KNOJ troops in Dobrovlje, Slovenia, 1944.

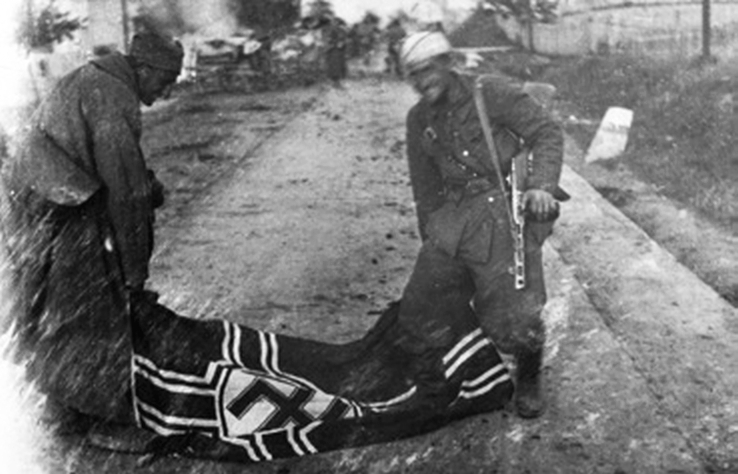
KNOJ troops with the captured Reichskriegsflagge in Macedonia, 1945.

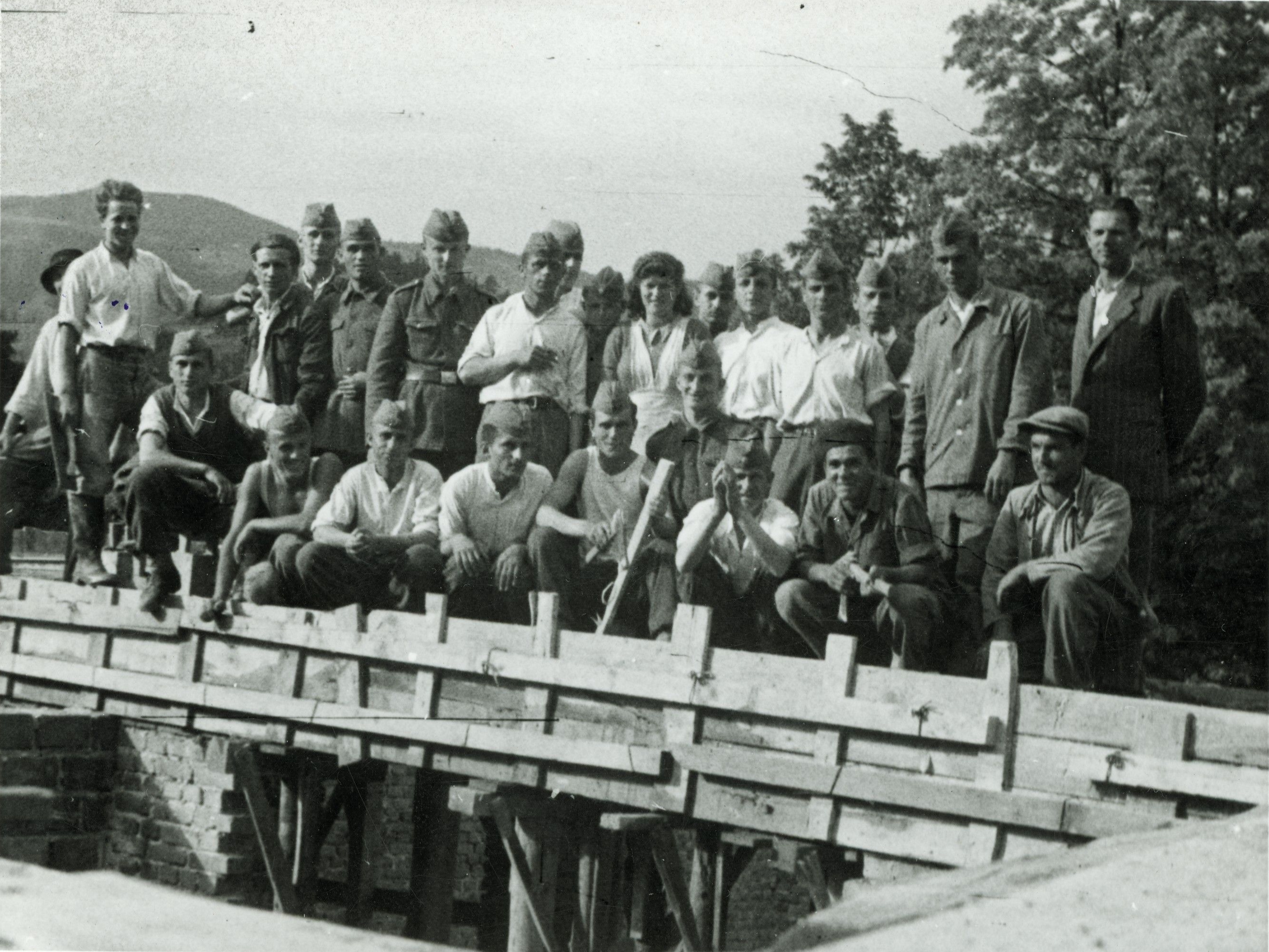
KNOJ troops helping with the construction of the Ravne na Koroškem gymnasium, SR Slovenia, 1951.

The People's Defence Corps of Yugoslavia or KNOJ (Serbo-Croatian: Korpus narodne odbrane Jugoslavije, Macedonian: Корпус на народна одбрана Југославија, Slovene: Korpus narodne obrambe Jugoslavije), was a corps of the Yugoslav Partisans in charge of internal security of liberated territories during World War II in Yugoslavia and later the territory of Communist Yugoslavia.

== History ==
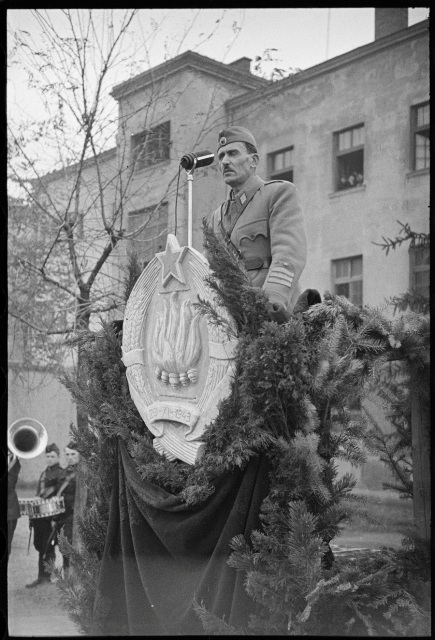
Major general Jovan Vukotić holding a speech during the taking of oath of KNOJ's 1st Belgrade Brigade, 24 November 1944.

KNOJ was created based on a directive by Marshal of Yugoslavia, Josip Broz Tito, on 15 August 1944. As liberated territories expanded, the corps was established to allow Partisan military intelligence organization (Department for People's Protection, OZNA) continued focus on core tasks. The corps comprised about 80,000 men at its peak. The first commander was Jovan Vukotić (1907–1982) and the supervision lay with the political commissar Vlado Janić (1904–1991). KNOJ was rarely used at the front, instead fell under the direction and supervision of OZNA.

In July 1944, just before the formation of KNOJ, there were about 5,000 soldiers in defense units that dealt with security on liberated territories. At the end of World War II in Europe, in May 1945, KNOJ consisted of eight divisions. The basic tasks of the KNOJ were to cleanse the liberated territory from all kinds of enemies, to help the National Liberation Committees in organizing life in the free territory and securing the borders of Yugoslavia. After the end of the war, KNOJ, in cooperation with other security forces, was the basic factor for the security of the country's borders and the destruction of remaining quisling units.

The National Defense Corps of Yugoslavia was disbanded in January 1953, and its jurisdiction was taken over by Yugoslav People's Army (armed forces) and Militia (police forces).

== See also ==
- Directorate for State Security (Yugoslavia) (UDBA)
- KOS (Yugoslavia)
- Ministry of the Interior (Yugoslavia)
- Operation Gvardijan
