= Stara Gradiška prison =

Prison in Croatia from 1799 to 1993

Stara Gradiška prison is a former prison at Stara Gradiška, Croatia.

The prison site was first established in 1799.

During World War II, the former Austro-Hungarian fortress was used by the Ustaša regime as the Stara Gradiška concentration camp, a part of the Jasenovac complex, the largest extermination camp in occupied Yugoslavia.

From 1945 until the late 1980s, the prison at Stara Gradiška held political prisoners of the communist regime.

The detention facility was shut down by the Republic of Croatia in 1990, a decision made formal in February 1991. However, from October 1991 until July 1993, the prison was again re-opened by the Krajina Serbs, who captured and detained numerous Croats in the facility during the Croatian War of Independence.

As of 2007, the municipality planned to turn the site into a museum. As of 2012, the Catholic Church planned to build a memorial church in the area.
