= Marija Buždon-Slomić =

Croatian concentration camp guard

A wartime picture of Marija Buždon-Slomić (right) with Nada Šakić (left)

Marija Buždon-Slomić (15 August 1923 – 5 June 1945) was a prison guard at Stara Gradiška, a sub-camp of the Jasenovac concentration camp in the Axis puppet state known as the Independent State of Croatia (NDH) during World War II. A pre-war factory worker, she joined the fascist, Croatian nationalist Ustaše movement in 1942 and later became the commander of the women's section at Stara Gradiška, where she likely met her future husband, Mirko Slišković-Slomić, who was himself a concentration camp official. In the course of her duties, Buždon-Slomić quickly distinguished herself for her sadism and cruelty. Shortly after the war, she was captured by the Yugoslav Partisans, convicted by a military tribunal and executed together with her husband.

== Biography ==
Marija Buždon was born in the village of Praputnjak, near the coastal town of Bakar, on 15 August 1923. Before the outbreak of World War II in Yugoslavia, she worked in a factory, though sources disagree whether it was a tobacco factory or a chocolate factory. In October 1942, she joined the fascist, Croatian nationalist Ustaše movement which ruled the Axis puppet state known as the Independent State of Croatia (Croatian: Nezavisna država Hrvatska; NDH). She was soon assigned to Stara Gradiška, a sub-camp of the Jasenovac concentration camp, where, owing to the patronage of Vjekoslav Luburić, she soon became the commander of the women's section. Her deputy was Milka Pribanić, who escaped to Germany after the war. It was probably at Stara Gradiška that Buždon met her future husband Mirko Slišković-Slomić, a pre-war law student who by November 1942 was serving as the deputy warden of Camp III, and later as the head of its administrative department. Having hyphenated her surname upon her marriage, Buždon-Slomić quickly distinguished herself for her cruelty. She punished prisoners for even the smallest infractions, either by "throwing them into solitary confinement or by whipping or beating them." She "often appeared in front of the detainees with a revolver around her waist," survivor Ilija Jakovljević recounted. "A model of an Ustaša woman; she despised the detainees. Anyone who thought they could charm her by harmonious stature, sweet words, or a kind look was mistaken. She was strictly attached to her 'idea', getting drunk and whoring only with the Ustašas."

The ruins of one of the cell blocks at Stara Gradiška, 2015

Buždon-Slomić would often be accompanied by Luburić's half-sister Nada, who would later marry Jasenovac's final commander, Dinko Šakić. According to survivors, many of the killings would take place at night, and Buždon-Slomić, Pribanić and Šakić―joined by male guards—would strangle their victims with wire. The historian Martina Bitunjac believes that Buždon-Slomić "saw the killings as a way of competing against her male counterparts." One witness saw Buždon-Slomić "order an exhausted detainee to get up, and when she could not get up due to weakness and illness, she strangled her with her own hands." Another recalled seeing her shoot an elderly woman in front of her daughter for not handing over a watch which once belonged to her late son. A third said that, while separating children from their mothers, Buždon-Slomić and camp guard Božica Obradović "threw one child that the mother did not give away into the well, and then beat the mother with a whip." Several survivors described how Buždon-Slomić and camp guard Mirko Runjaš once entered the sub-camp's women's quarters, and "took 4–5 women to one room," where they "slaughter[ed] them". One survivor recalled seeing Buždon-Slomić drenched in blood and proudly telling her fellow camp guard, the renegade Franciscan friar Miroslav Filipović, that she had just "slaughtered seven of them". This is said to have greatly impressed Filipović, who exclaimed, "Now I love you, now I know you're a real little Ustasha girl." On another occasion, following the arrival of 80 captured Partisans of the First Serbian Shock Brigade, Buždon-Slomić ordered the prisoners to undress. The heads of the female prisoners were shaved and the whole group was forced to walk through the camp while beating each other, shouting: "We are the People's Liberation Army! We are the First Serbian Shock Brigade!"

As the war drew to a close, Buždon-Slomić and her husband retreated to Zagreb. One source maintains they were captured by the Partisans at Bleiburg, whilst according to another, they were arrested by the Partisans shortly after the fall of Zagreb. A third source holds that Buždon-Slomić was arrested aboard a train, disguised as a peasant woman, after being recognized by a former camp inmate. At their subsequent interrogations, neither she nor her husband denied the murders they were accused of committing at Stara Gradiška. On 28 May, she was sentenced to death by a military tribunal in Zagreb. She was executed in Zagreb on 5 June. The method of execution was by hanging. Her husband met the same fate.

== Legacy ==
Buždon-Slomić is notable for being the only woman among the senior Jasenovac officials whose signatures were found affixed to documents in the camp's archives. She was portrayed by the actress Martina Kitanović in the 2021 Serbian feature film Dara of Jasenovac.

== See also ==
- Concentration camps in the Independent State of Croatia
