= Rory Yeomans =

British historian

- Education: University College London PhD
- Occupations: Historian; Researcher
- Notable work: Visions of Annihilation: The Ustasha Regime and the Cultural Politics of Fascism, 1941–1945

Rory Yeomans is a British historian who is a senior international research analyst at the International Directorate of the Ministry of Justice.

== Education and career ==
Yeomans received his PhD from the School of Slavonic and East European Studies at University College London in 2005. He was a member of the School of Historical Studies at the Institute for Advanced Study in Princeton, New Jersey. He has held fellowships at the University of Oxford, the Centre for Advanced Study in Bulgaria and the Wiener Wiesenthal Institute for Holocaust Studies, as well as a European Holocaust Research Infrastructure fellowship with the Bundesarchiv in Berlin.

His main research interests lie in the interdisciplinary cultural, social and economic history of the Independent State of Croatia, interwar and socialist Yugoslavia, and comparative fascism with an emphasis on non-elite histories. His best known work, Visions of Annihilation: The Ustasha Regime and the Cultural Politics of Fascism, 1941-1945, is considered an important English language contribution to the historiography of the Ustasha regime.

== Books ==
- Visions of Annihilation: The Ustasha Regime and the Cultural Politics of Fascism, 1941-1945 (University of Pittsburgh Press, 2012). ISBN 978-0-82297-793-3
- Racial Science in Hitler's New Europe, 1938-1945, co-edited with Anton Weiss-Wendt (University of Nebraska Press, 2013). ISBN 978-0-80324-507-5
- The Utopia of Terror: Life and Death in Wartime Croatia (Boydell & Brewer, 2015). ISBN 978-1-58046-545-8
