= Božidar Kavran =

Croatian WW2 politician (1913–1948)

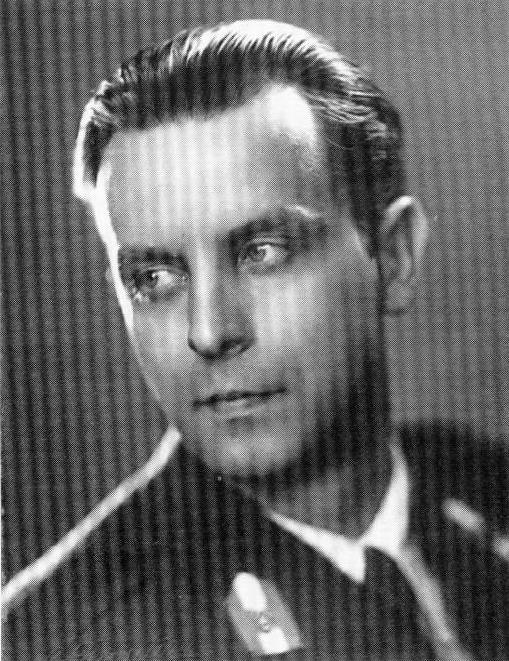
Božidar Kavran

Božidar Kavran (1913–1948) was a member of the Croatian World War II Ustaše regime.

Kavran was born in Zagreb on 22 September 1913. He served as leader of the Ustaše from May 1943 onwards. He attempted to organize a rebellion against the Communist Yugoslav government in the post-war years. He led a group of exiled Croatian fighters into the country on 4 July 1948. They called this Operation April 10. However, he was captured by the UDBA in Operation Gvardijan and hanged in 1948.

== Bibliography ==
- Adriano, Pino; Cingolani, Giorgio (2018). Nationalism and Terror: Ante Pavelić and Ustasha Terrorism from Fascism to the Cold War. Central European University Press.
