= Service for Research and Documentation =

- Služba za Istraživanje i Dokumentaciju

Agency overview
- Formed: 1949
- Dissolved: 2007
- Jurisdiction: Ministry of Foreign Affairs
- Headquarters: Belgrade, Serbia

The Service for Research and Documentation (Serbian: Služba za Istraživanje i Dokumentaciju; abbr. SID) was the foreign intelligence agency of Serbia. It was under authority of Ministry of Foreign Affairs of Serbia. The Service's responsibility was intelligence gathering and other security activities relating to terrorism.

== History ==
The Service was established in 1947 in the former Yugoslavia.

On 11 December 2007, new Law on security and intelligence services of Republic of Serbia was adopted, which determined three security and intelligence agencies of Serbia. The three existing are:

- BIA (Security Intelligence Agency)
- VOA (Military Intelligence Agency)
- VBA (Military Security Agency)

The other two, the Service for Research and Documentation was planned to be dissolved and partly reorganized into Department for Analytic and Support (Serbian: Odeljenje za Analitiku i Podršku), and Security Service of Foreign Ministry was merged into the Department within Ministry responsible for technical security of Ministry buildings and officers.

On 14 September 2013, the Minister of Foreign Affairs Ivan Mrkić has announced the restoring of the Service. Until now, that has not happened.
