= Enver Hadri =

Albanian human rights activist

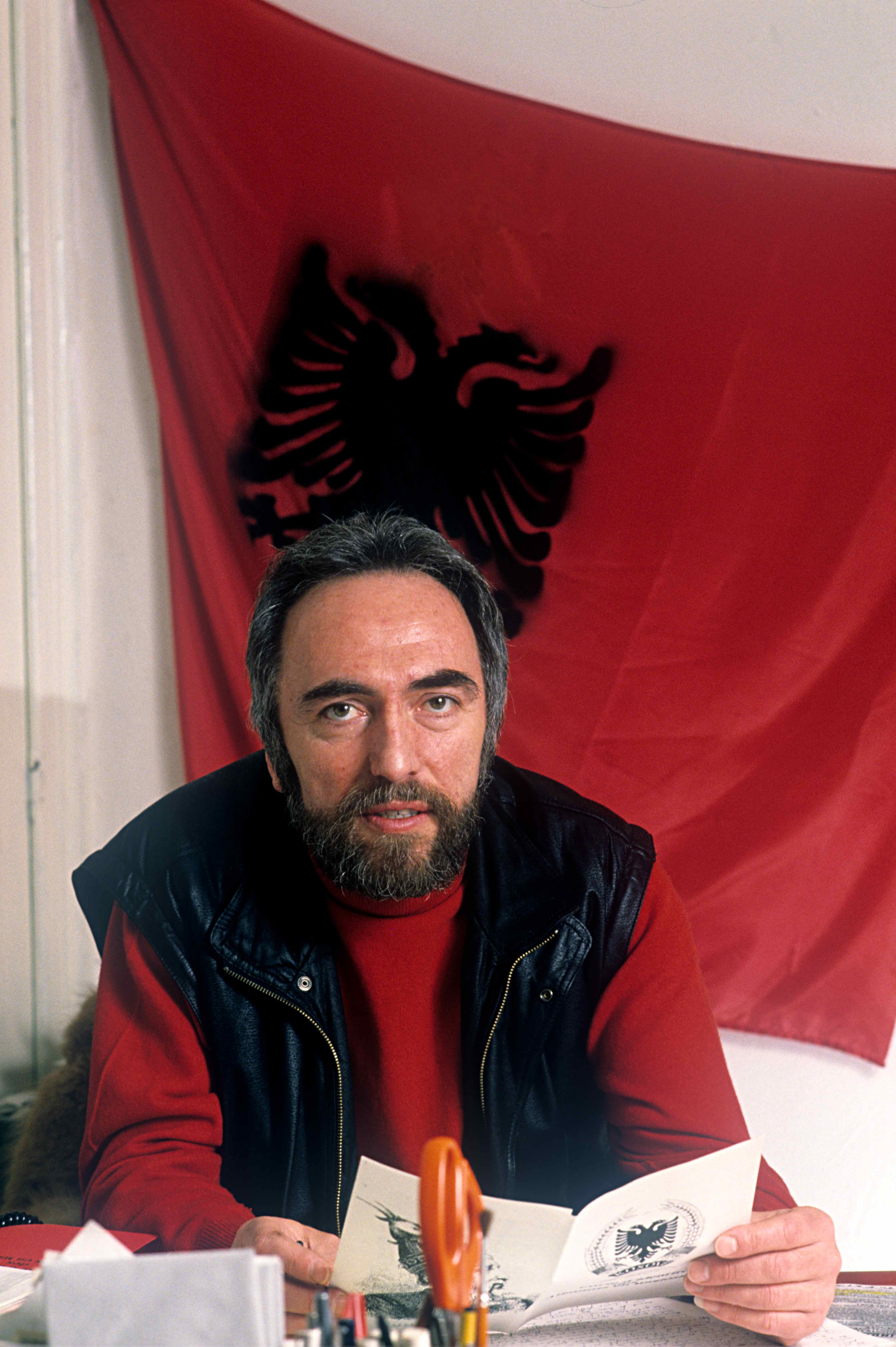
Enver Hadri

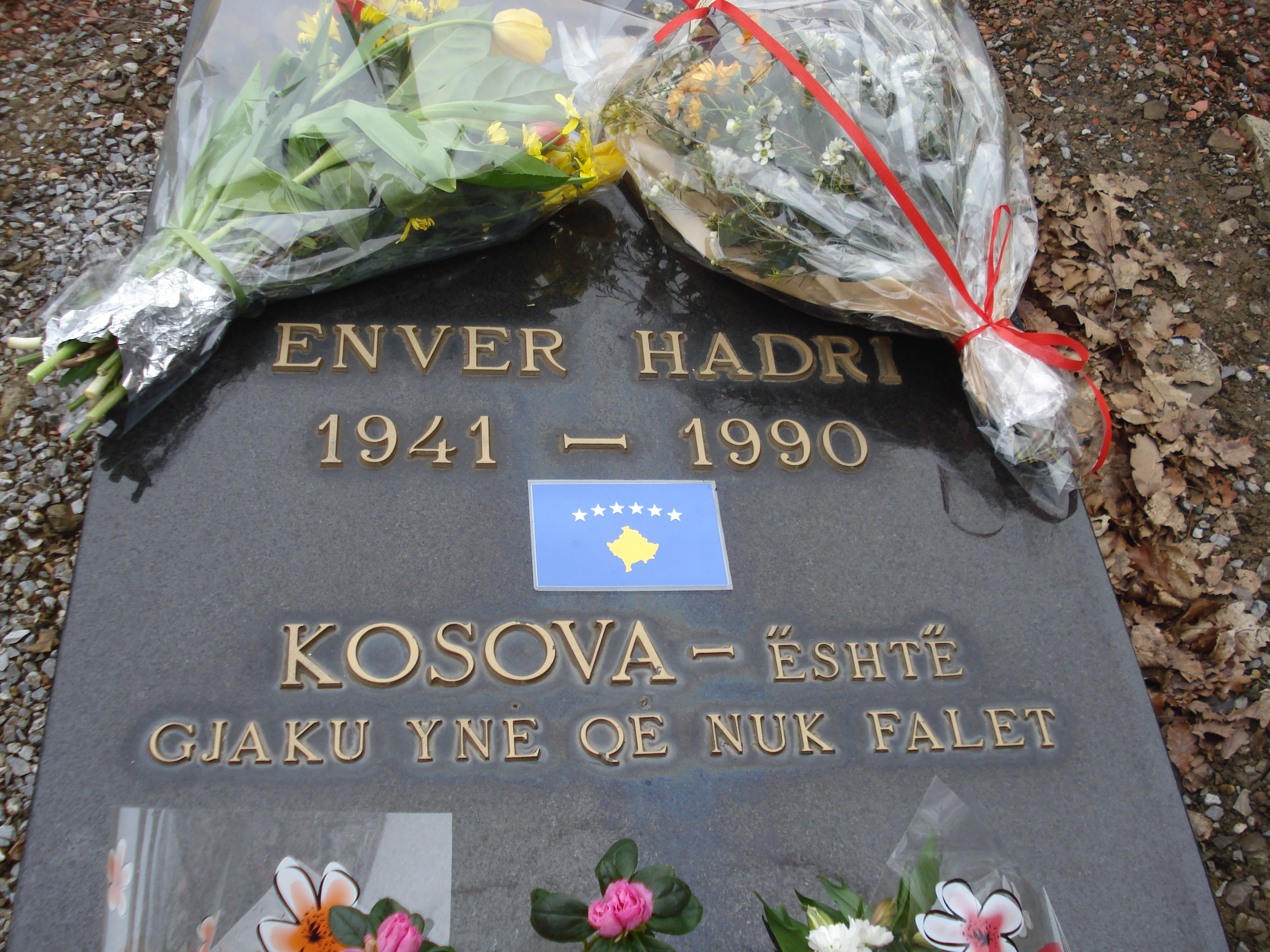
The tomb with the phrase "Kosovo is our unforgivable blood."

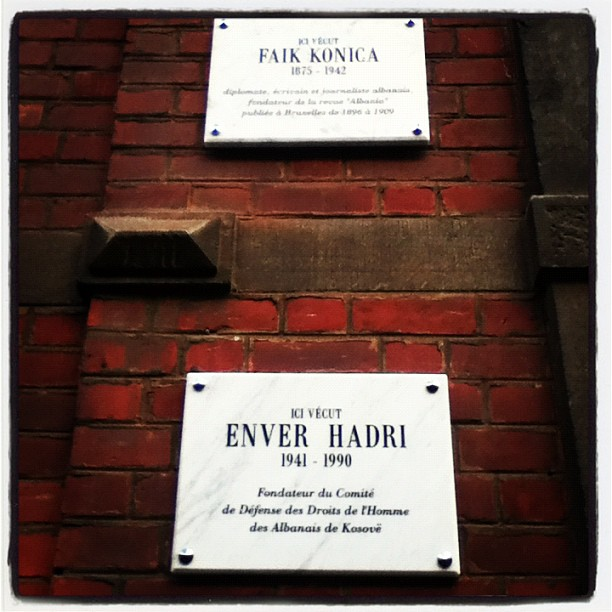
Commemorative plaque - Rue d'Albanie 23

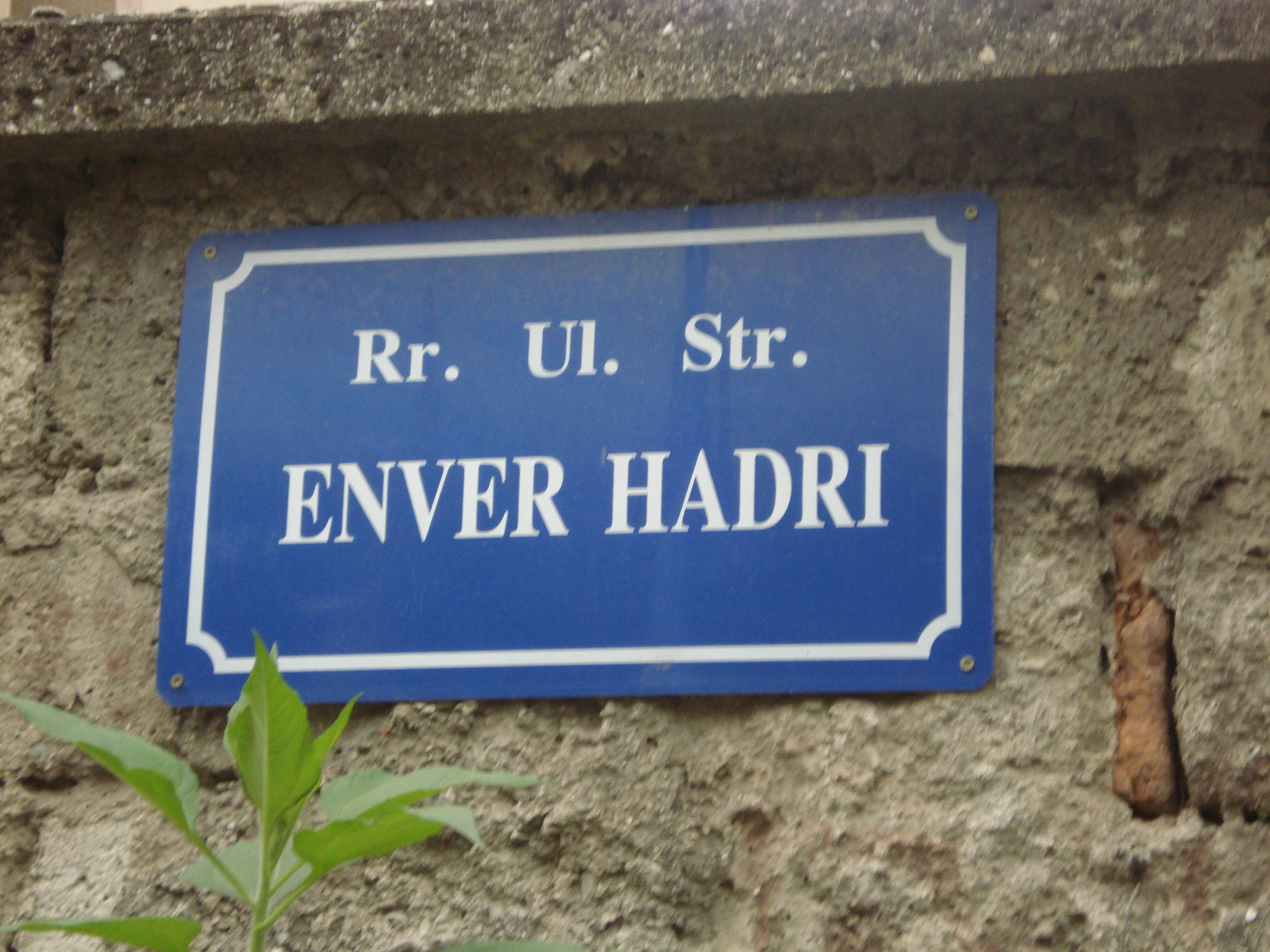
Enver Hadri street Peje Kosove

Enver Hadri (1941 – 25 February 1990) was a Kosovo Albanian human rights activist. According to an Albanian blog AACL, he was assassinated while he stopped at a traffic light in Brussels, by three Yugoslavs working for State Security Administration (UDBA) according to the verdict handed down on Mardi, Veselin Vukotić and Andrija Drašković were found guilty of carrying out the crime and Božidar Spacić of ordering it. This happened in the municipality of Saint-Gilles, at the crossroads between the Rue Saint-Bernard and the Rue de la Victoire. Hadri had with him the list of 32 Albanians killed in Kosovo by Serbia, which he would submit to the European Parliament's Human Rights Committee the next day. He had lived in Brussels since 1972 where he worked to put on agenda the human rights of Albanians in Kosovo.

Veselin Vukotić was arrested in Spain in 2006. According to Spanish police, Vukotić in addition to killing Enver Hadri, also had documents incriminating former Yugoslav President Slobodan Milošević in numerous assassinations. In April 2003, a protected U.N. war crimes prosecution witness who said he had worked for Yugoslavia's secret service claimed in Milošević's trial in The Hague that Vukotić once admitted to killing Hadri. The protected witness testifying from behind tinted glass said: Vukotić 'told me about the liquidation of Albanians around Europe'. He did it under the orders of the Yugoslav secret service. The last he mentioned was that he killed Hadri.
