= OZNA =

Secret police of Communist Yugoslavia

Department for Protection of the People
- Odeljenje za zaštitu naroda (Serbian); Odjeljenje za zaštitu naroda (Croatian); Oddelek za zaščito naroda (Slovene); Одделение за заштита на народот (Macedonian)

Secret police overview
- Formed: May 13, 1944
- Preceding Secret police: Department for State Protection
- Dissolved: March 1946
- Superseding agencies: KOS (military); UDBA (civil)
- Jurisdiction: FPR Yugoslavia
- Headquarters: Belgrade

The Department for Protection of the People, commonly known under its Serbo-Croatian acronym as OZNA, was the secret police of Communist Yugoslavia that existed between 1944 and 1946.

== Founding ==
The OZNA was founded on May 13, 1944, according to decision of Josip Broz Tito and under the leadership of Aleksandar Ranković (nom de guerre Marko), a top member of the Politburo until his downfall in 1966, and a close associate of Josip Broz Tito.

On May 24, 1944, only a day before Operation Rösselsprung, Tito signed the Military Courts Regulations (Serbo-Croatian: Uredba o vojnim sudovima NOVJ), which in article number 27 stated that the court reaches its decisions whether the accused are guilty or not based on its free evaluation, regardless of the evidence. Based on the investigations performed by the OZNA, the military courts reached their decisions.

== Function ==
Until the OZNA was established, intelligence and security tasks were carried out by several organizations. In spring 1944, the tasks were carried out by the Section for Protection of People in central and western Bosnia, part of Croatia, and Vojvodina; the centers of territorial intelligence in Croatia, Vojvodina, and Montenegro; the intelligence division of the Internal Affairs Section within the Slovene National Liberation Committee presidency in Slovenia; and the intelligence service of the Partisan detachments in Central Serbia, Macedonia, and Kosovo.

== Organization ==
The reorganization of intelligence and security could not satisfy the growing needs of the Supreme Staff. The OZNA was created as an autonomous entity, a military organization whose unitary structure and centralized leadership were to ensure a tough political line in the intelligence and counter-intelligence services. All OZNA tasks were divided into four groups, each comprising an organizational unit:

1. intelligence under Maks Baće
2. counter-intelligence under Pavle Pekić
3. army security under Jeftimije Jefto Šašić, and
4. technical/statistics under Mijat Vuletić

The first section (intelligence) organized intelligence activity in other countries, enemy state institutions, and occupied territory. It recruited agents and sent them to work outside the borders of the liberated territory. It collected intelligence on enemy agent networks, police, quisling state machinery, and quisling military units. This was essentially an offensive intelligence service, directed against foreign countries and occupied territory.

The second section (counterintelligence service in the liberated territory) collected information from trusted informers on political groups which had either joined the national liberation movement or stayed outside it, on enemy agent activities, and on armed groups of national traitors and fifth columnists.

The third section organized counter-intelligence protection of armed forces and was active only in the NOVJ & PO (People's Liberation Army of Yugoslavia and Partisan Detachments).

The fourth section performed statistical and technical tasks, processed information, and kept records. This section also included special photography, secret writing, radio centers, and decoders.

A fifth and sixth section were formed in the OZNA in March and April 1945.

The fifth section was formed as a counterintelligence service against foreign agent networks in Yugoslavia; that is, foreign intelligence services. (In 1946, this section merged with the new third section, which was created after the military counterintelligence service became independent).

The sixth section performed tasks dealing with counter-intelligence protection of transportation but was absorbed soon after its establishment by the second sector.

== Activities ==
When the National Liberation Army changed its name to the Yugoslav Army (JA) on March 1, 1945, the OZNA of Democratic Federal Yugoslavia proclaimed by special directive (March 24, 1945) a new organization of the JA – OZNA. The OZNA was in direct command of counter-intelligence protection of military command posts, institutions, and units. Sections were set up within independent corps. This third OZNA section was in force until the end of July 1945.

The "military" and "civil" parts of the OZNA began to separate in 1945 and split in March 1946. At that time, the new splinter organizations, the Administrative Directorate for Security of JA – KOS (Kontra-Obaveštajna Služba) was formed from the military part and the Directorate for State Security (UDBA) from its civilian counterpart.

Since the OZNA was left without its third section after the military counter-intelligence service became independent, it formed a new third section unconnected to the previous one. It focused initially on reconstruction and combatting operations of the German intelligence service (especially Gestapo). Later, the third section assumed operations for all foreign intelligence services, borders, and traffic of foreigners (which were essentially the tasks of the fifth section).

The fourth section continued filing information they had been collecting within the OF VOS since 1941. From initial information files on 4,000 people, by the end of the war, the number had increased to 17,750.

The OZNA was led by a chief who was directly subordinate to the Supreme Commander of the Yugoslav Army, Marshal Josip Broz Tito.

=== Mass killings of the "enemies of the people" ===
Throughout its existence, the OZNA used illegal practices which included occasional mass murders of the "enemies of the people", under the justification of conducting the "revolution". The "enemies of the people" included not only local anti-communist forces but also notable individuals who did not support the communists, collaborators with the occupying Axis powers, wealthy individuals, captured members of Croatian Armed Forces (Independent State of Croatia) and representatives of religious organizations regardless of their specific religion, etc. This period was also characterized by the presence of strong armed anti-communist and fascist groups in central Serbia, Kosovo, Bosnia-Herzegovina, Croatia, and Slovenia. Some represented a serious challenge to the new communist authorities. In combating armed anti-communist groups, the OZNA and KNOJ murdered prisoners without any investigation or trial, sometimes also murdering civilians associated with them. The majority of the atrocities committed by communists were hidden from the public during the period of SFRJ.

The Government of Serbia and its Ministry of Justice established the commission to research atrocities that were committed by members of the Yugoslav Partisan Movement after they gained control over Serbia in autumn 1944. The report of this commission presented a list of 59,554 registered deaths after the communist victory in Serbia since autumn 1944 who died from various reasons.

== See also ==
- Directorate for State Security (UDBA)
- Counterintelligence Service (KOS)
- The People's Defence Corps of Yugoslavia (KNOJ)
- Crusaders (guerrilla)
- Operation Gvardijan
