= Stara Gradiška concentration camp =

WWII concentration camp in Croatia

- Concentration and extermination camp
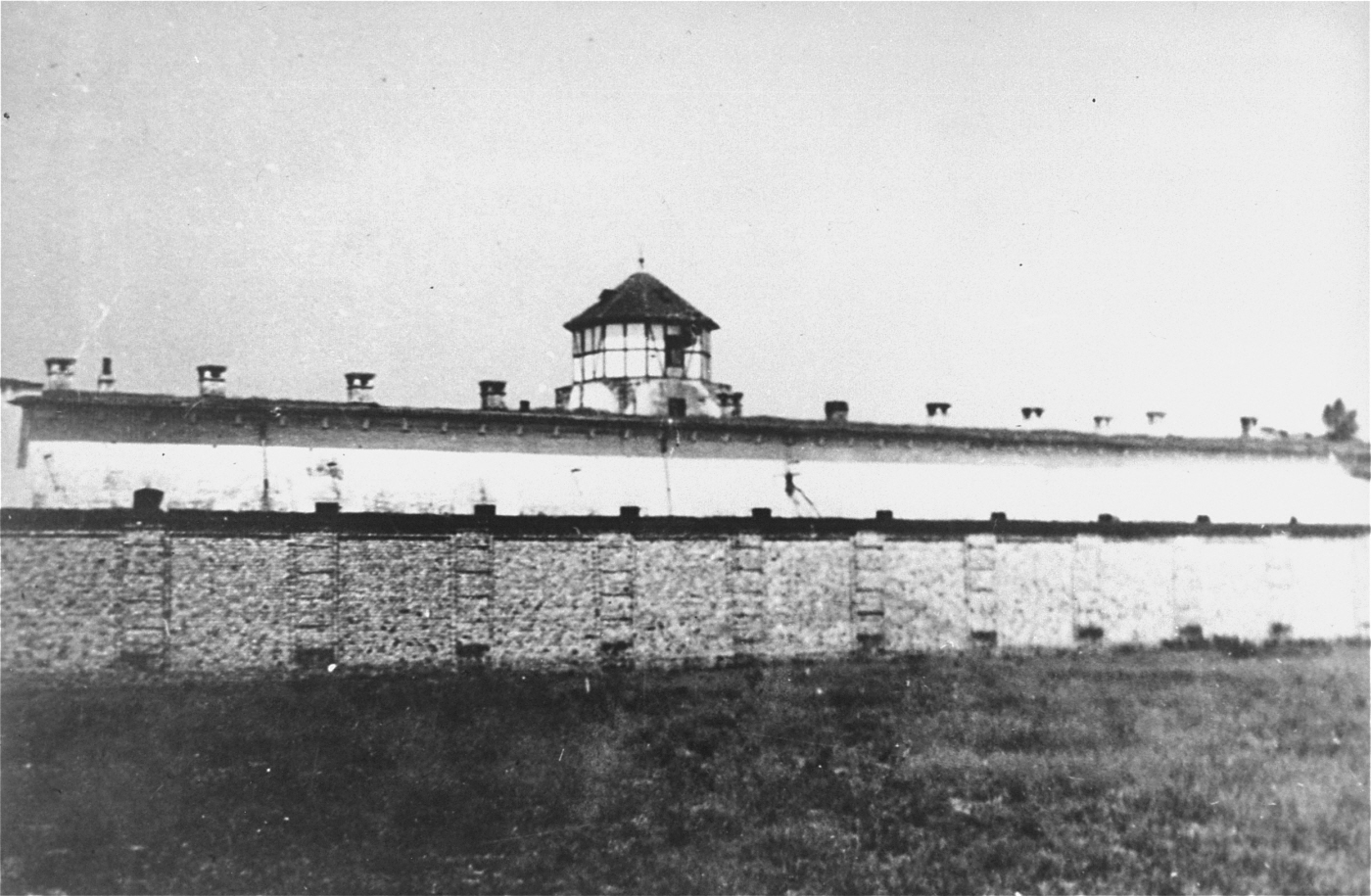
- View of the Stara Gradiška concentration camp at the site of the Stara Gradiška prison.

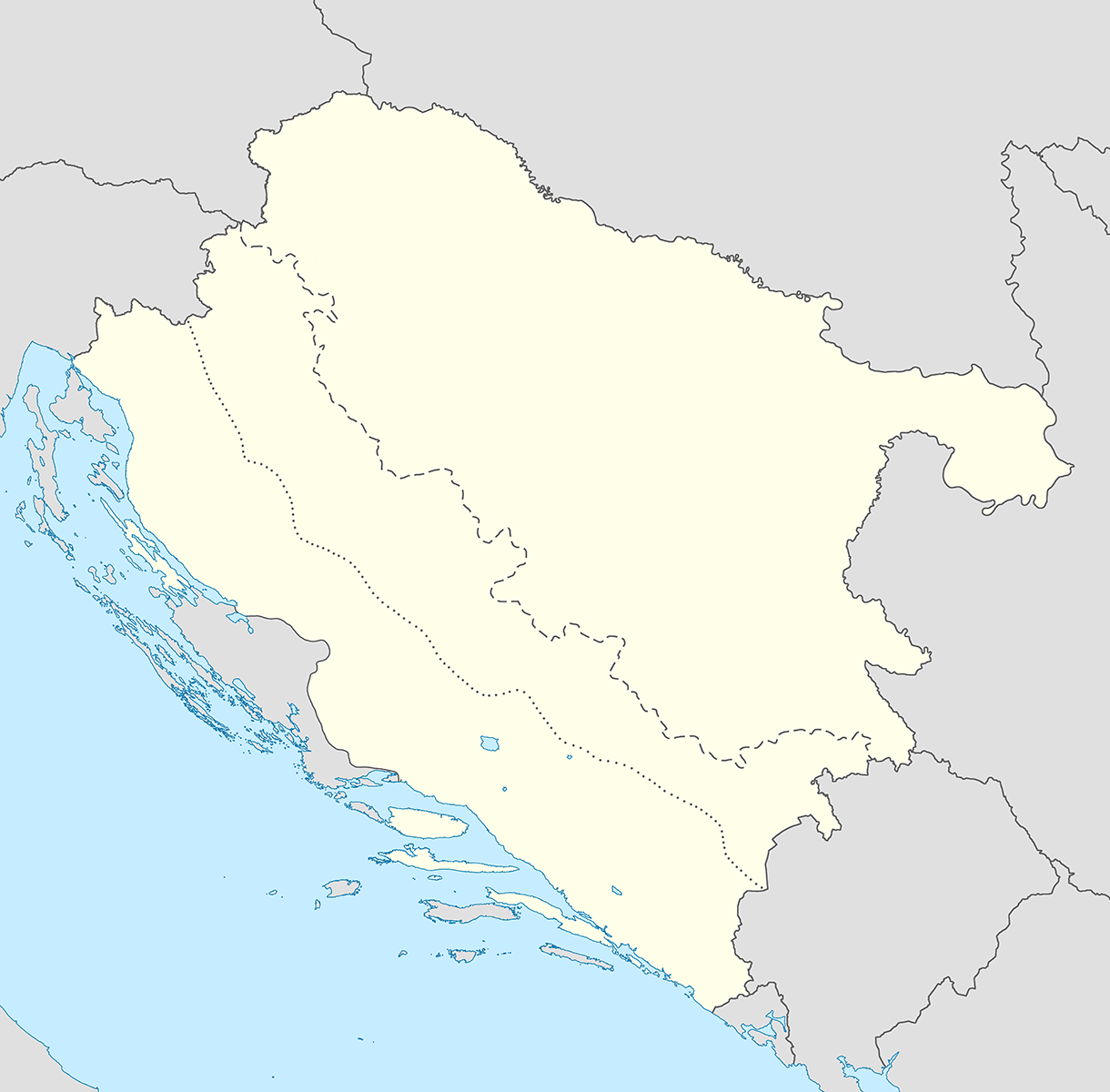
- Location within NDH
- Coordinates: 45°15′N 17°25′E
- Known for: Genocide of Serbs, Jews, Romani and political opponents in the Independent State of Croatia
- Location: Stara Gradiška, Independent State of Croatia (now Croatia)
- Operated by: Ustaše Supervisory Service (UNS)
- First built: August 1941
- Operational: August 1941 – 21 April 1945
- Inmates: Mainly Serbs, Jews, Roma, and dissident Croats and Bosnian Muslims (i.e. communists and anti-fascists)
- Killed: 12,790+
- Liberated by: Yugoslav Partisans
- Notable inmates: Nada Dimić
- Website: www.jusp-jasenovac.hr

Stara Gradiška was a concentration and extermination camp in the Independent State of Croatia (NDH) during World War II. The camp was specially constructed for women and children of Serb, Jewish and Romani ethnicity. Victims also included communist and anti-fascist Croats and Bosniaks. It was established by the Ustaše regime in 1941 at the Stara Gradiška prison near the eponymous village as the fifth subcamp of the Jasenovac concentration camp.

According to the list of victims by name of KCL Jasenovac, the Jasenovac memorial site, which includes research as of 2007, the names and data for 12,790 victims of the camp have been established.

== Systematic killing of inmates ==
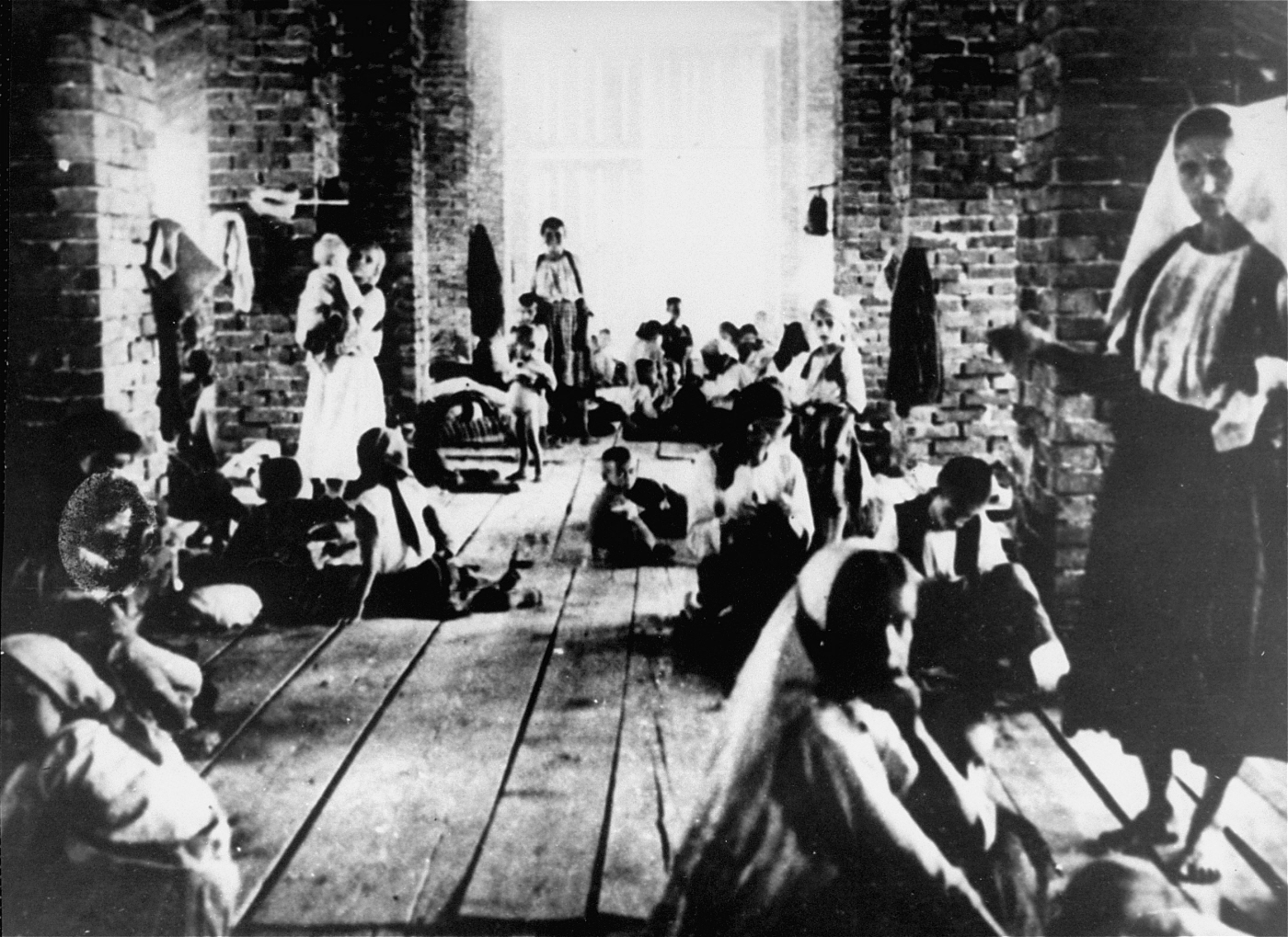
Mothers and children imprisoned in the tower of the concentration camp.

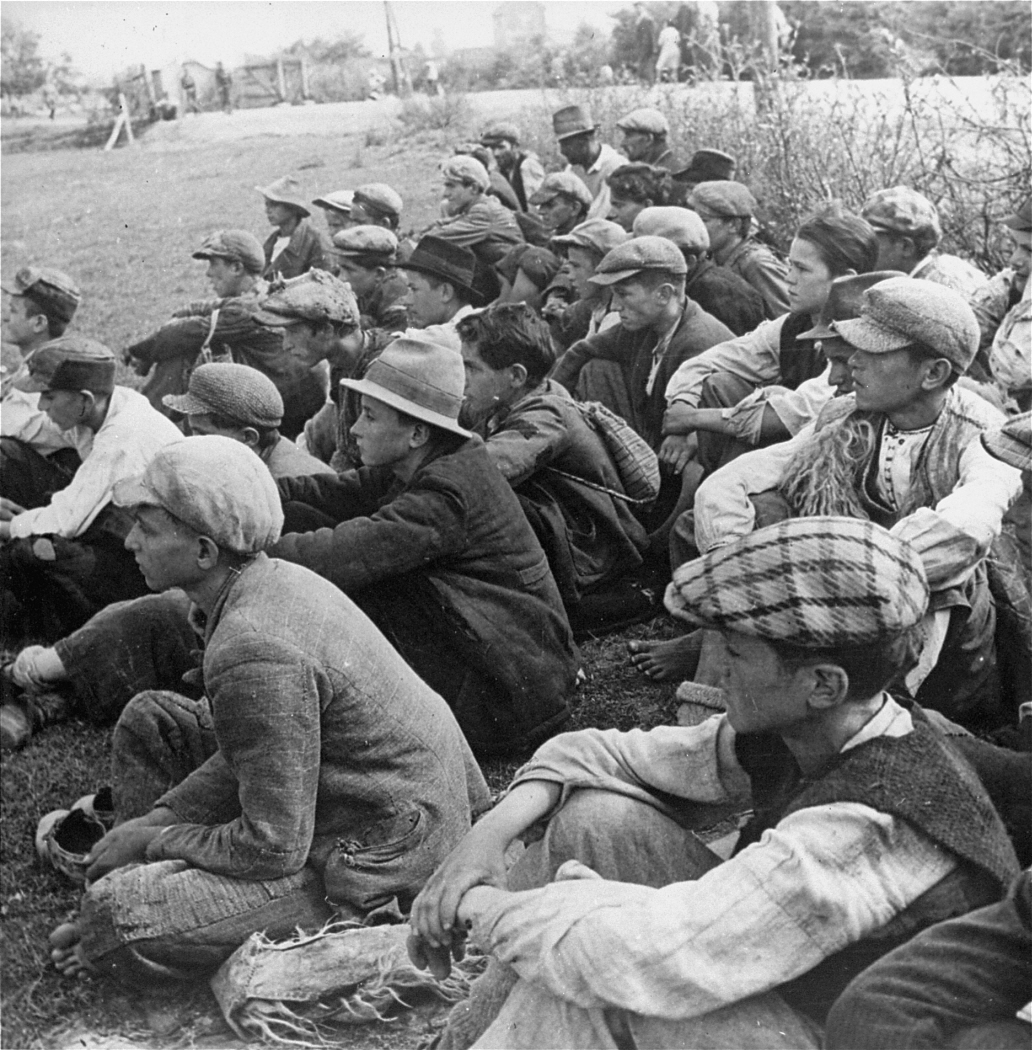
Prisoners seated in a field in the camp.

The camp was guarded by the Croatian Ustaše, including some female troops. Inmates were killed using different means, including firearms, mallets and knives. At the "K" or "Kula" unit, Serbian and Jewish women, with weak or little children, were starved and/or tortured at the "Gagro Hotel", a cellar which Ustaša Nikola Gagro used as a place of torture. Other inmates in the Kula unit were poisoned with gas.

Gas experiments were conducted initially at veterinary stables near the "Economy" unit, where horses and then humans were poisoned using sulphur dioxide and later Zyklon B. Gassing was also tested on children in the yard, where the camp commandant, Ustaša sergeant Ante Vrban, viewed its effects. Most gassing deaths occurred in the attics of "the infamous tower", where several thousand children from the Kozara region were killed in May, and 2000 more in June 1942. Subsequently, smaller groups of 400-600 children, and a few men and women, were gassed. At his trial, Vrban confirmed that Zyklon gas was used.

Witness Cijordana Friedlender (aka Jordana Fritlander), who was a guard at the camp, testified:

At that time fresh women and children came daily to the Camp at Stara Gradiška. About fourteen days later, Vrban [the Commandant of the Camp] ordered all children to be separated from their mothers and put into one room. Ten of us were told to carry them there in blankets. The children crawled about the room, and one child put an arm and leg through the doorway, so that the door could not be closed. Vrban shouted: 'Push it!' When I did not do that, he banged the door and crushed the child's leg. Then he took the child by its whole-leg, and banged it on the wall until it was dead. After that we continued carrying the children in. When the room was full, Vrban brought poison gas and killed them all.

According to witness Milka Zabičić, the gassing stopped due to a scheduled visit by a Red Cross delegation in 1943, which did not arrive until June 1944. Gas-vans were constructed to kill Serb and Jewish women and children who came to Stara Gradiška from the Đakovo camp in June–July 1942. A witness, Dragutin Roller, who was a camp inmate, stated that guard Dinko Šakić "directed his guards to pack women and children into the vans, fitted a rubber hose from the exhaust to the interior and drove around and around the camp until the passengers were dead" and that "they killed at least half the group like this as soon as they arrived".

== Cruelty ==
Stara Gradiška became notorious for crimes committed against women and children. Examples included the torture that took place in cellar 3, the "Gagro Hotel", where inmates were starved, tortured and executed. At Šakić's trial, witness Ivo Senjanović recalled how people were locked there without food or water: "The people were gradually dying. It was horrible to hear them cry for help." As for the conditions, witness Cadik Danon said:

At once we spread our blankets and lay down to recover our strength. Around noon they drove us out into the yard and distributed the portion of cattle turnip with water without salt or grease; everything was the same as in Jasenovac. Immediately after lunch, they thrust us into the dungeon and locked us in.

The most infamous staff included Nikola Gagro, Ante Vrban, Jozo Stojčić and, notably, the commander, a Franciscan friar/military chaplain, Miroslav Filipović-Majstorović, who killed scores of women and children with his bare hands. The treatment of inmates was so horrific that on the night of 29 August 1942, bets were allegedly made among the prison guards as to who could liquidate the largest number of inmates. Petar Brzica, one of the guards reportedly cut the throats of 1,360 prisoners with a butcher knife. A gold watch, a silver service, a roasted suckling pig, and wine were among his rewards. The guards included women such as Milka Pribanić, Božena Obradović, Maja Buždon (who were sisters or wives of the male guards) who were known for their cruelty and particularly feared by inmates. This included Nada Luburić, sister of the first commandant of Jasenovac, Maks Luburić, and wife of Dinko Šakić.

Andrija Artuković who was Minister of Interior of the NDH ordered sodium hydroxide to be added to the food of the children in order to exterminate them in a timely fashion. The murder of children was deemed a priority by the NDH as they saw Serbian children as 'seeds of the beast'.

== Clearing the camp ==
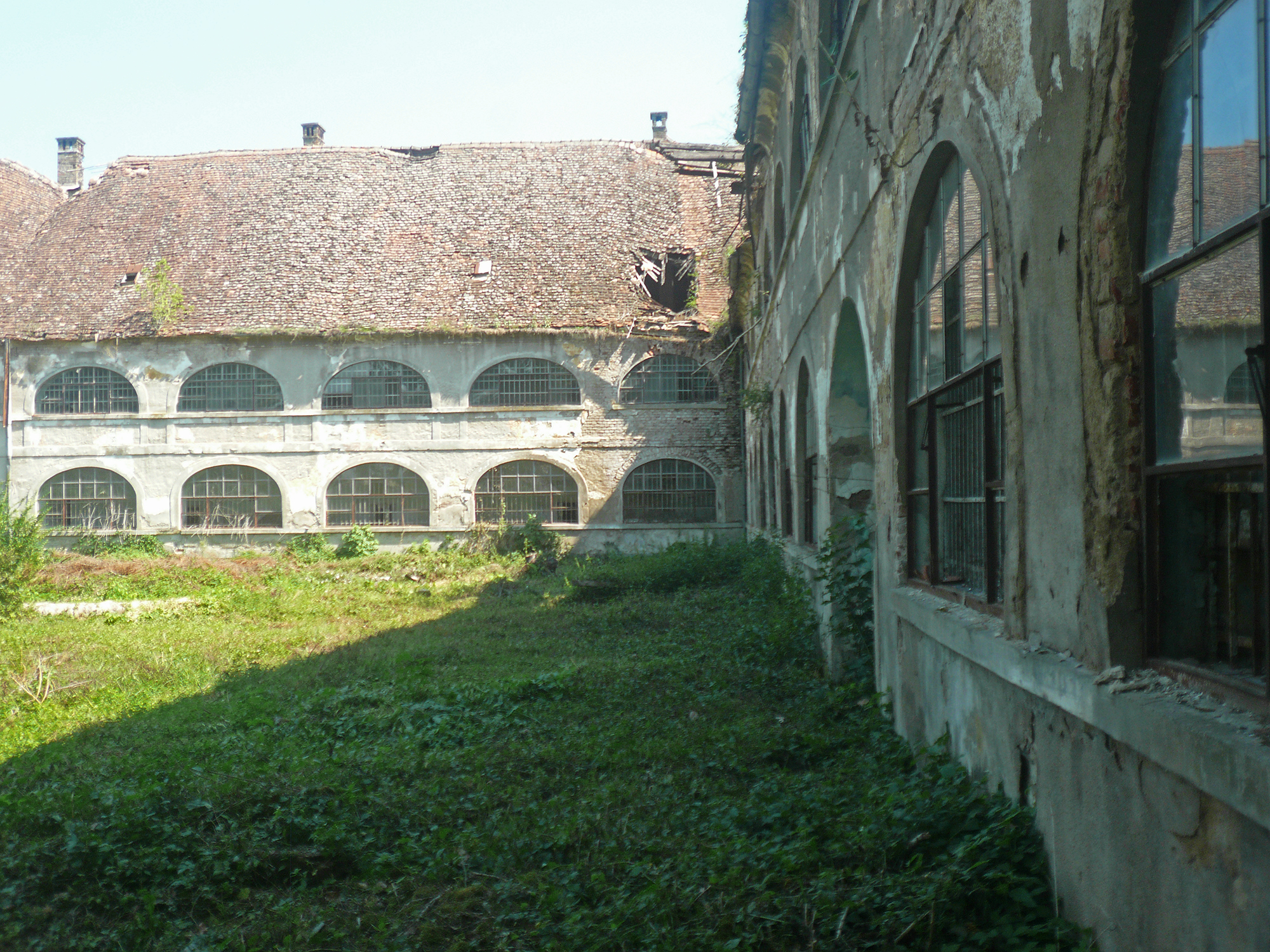
Remains of the camp in 2018

In early April 1945, when the Partisans were fighting nearby Stara Gradiška, the Ustaše began clearing the camp, killing some of the inmates and transporting others to Lepoglava and from there to Jasenovac, where they were to be exterminated. Several survivors, like Šimo (or Šime) Klaić, who stressed at Šakić's trial that Lepoglava "was horrible, as if all the evil from Stara Gradiška and Jasenovac had concentrated there", fled from the train cart in which they were to be transported to Jasenovac. Klaić later learned, as he testified in the court, that the other two carts in the transport were torched in Jasenovac. The camp was liberated in April 1945 by the Partisans.

== List of notable prisoners ==
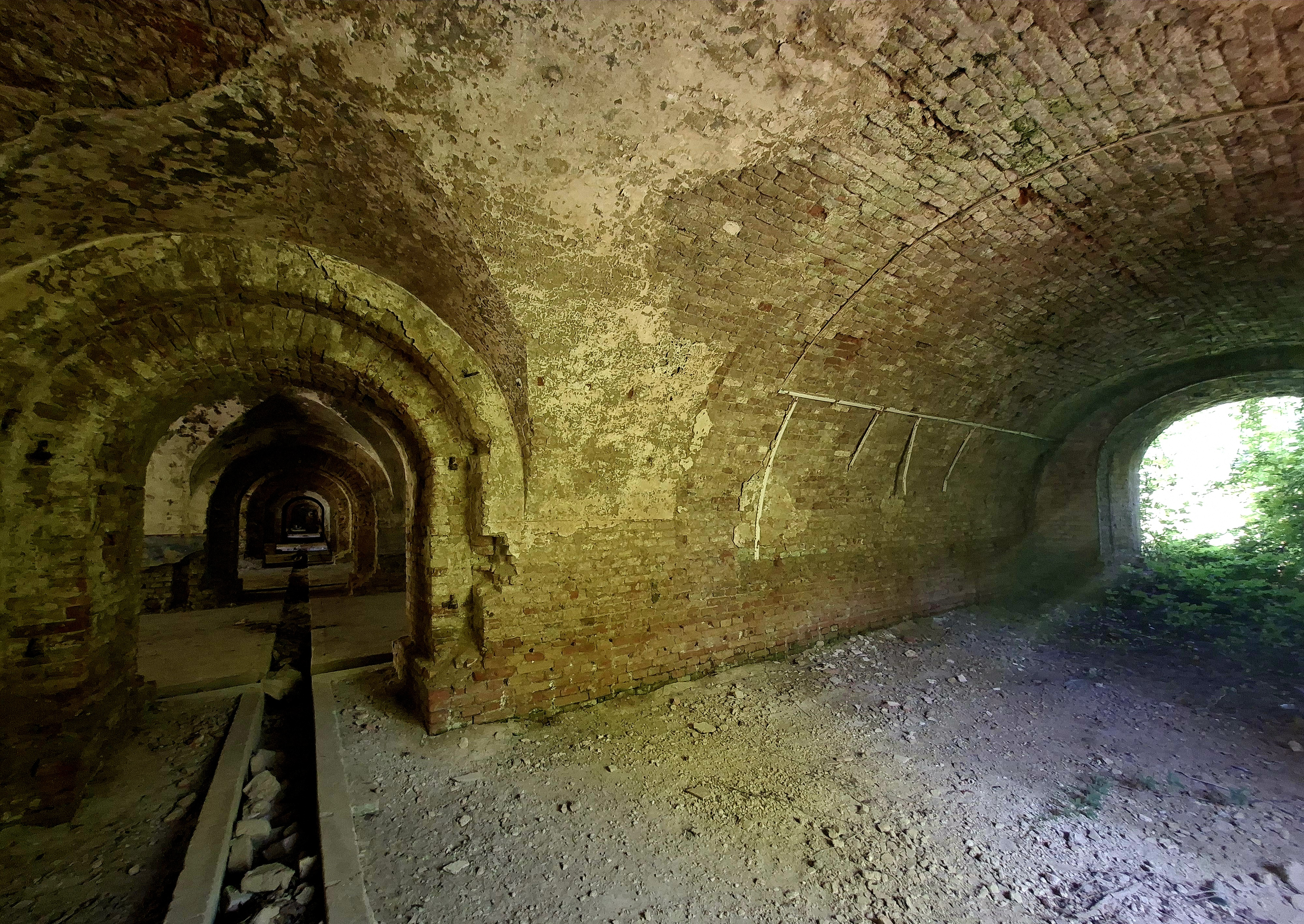
Inside view of the camp in 2025

- Vlado Singer, Croatian politician and member of the Ustaše movement.
- Magda Bošković, Croatian communist, Partisan and member of the women's rights movement.
- Nada Dimić, Croatian Communist and Partisan activist of ethnic Serb descent.
- Viktor Budicki, doctor and surviving son of Croatian motorsport pioneer Ferdinand Budicki, died in a 1944 camp typhoid epidemic and was given honourable marked burial for his medical services.

== See also ==
- Stara Gradiška prison

== Bibliography ==
- Rivelli, Marco Aurelio (1998). Le génocide occulté: État Indépendant de Croatie 1941–1945 [Hidden Genocide: The Independent State of Croatia 1941–1945] (in French). Lausanne: L'age d'Homme. ISBN 9782825111529.
- Rivelli, Marco Aurelio (1999). L'arcivescovo del genocidio: Monsignor Stepinac, il Vaticano e la dittatura ustascia in Croazia, 1941-1945 [The Archbishop of Genocide: Monsignor Stepinac, the Vatican and the Ustaše dictatorship in Croatia, 1941-1945] (in Italian). Milano: Kaos. ISBN 9788879530798.
- Dizdar, Zdravko (1997). Tko je tko u NDH Hrvatska 1941.–1945. Zagreb: Minerva. ISBN 953-6377-03-9.
- Goldstein, Slavko (2007). 1941. - godina koja se vraća. Zagreb: Novi Liber. ISBN 978-953-6045-48-8.
- Mirković, Jovan (2014). Злочини над Србима у Независној Држави Хрватској – фотомонографија / Crimes against Serbs in the Independent State of Croatia – photomonograph. Svet knjige Belgrade. ISBN 978-86-7396-465-2. Archived from the original on 8 April 2016.
- Romano, Jaša (1980). Jevreji Jugoslavije 1941-1945, žrtve genocida i učesnici NOR. Savez jevrejskih opstina Jugoslavije.
