= Directorate for State Security (Yugoslavia) =

Secret police organization of Yugoslavia

State Security Service
- Služba državne bezbednosti (Serbian); Služba državne sigurnosti (Croatian); Служба за државна безбедност (Macedonian); Služba državne varnosti (Slovene)

Intelligence and security agency overview
- Formed: 13 March 1946
- Preceding Intelligence and security agency: OZNA
- Dissolved: 1991
- Jurisdiction: SFR Yugoslavia
- Headquarters: Belgrade

The State Security Service, also known by its original name as the Directorate for State Security, was the national secret police intelligence and security agency of Socialist Federal Republic of Yugoslavia (SFR Yugoslavia). It was at all times best known by the acronym UDBA, which is derived from the organization's original name in the Serbo-Croatian language: "Uprava državne bezbednosti" ("Directorate for State Security").

The acronyms SDB (Serbian) or SDS (Croatian) were used officially after the organization was renamed into "State Security Service". In its latter decades it was composed of eight semi-independent secret police organizations—one for each of the six Yugoslav federal republics and two for the autonomous provinces—coordinated by the central federal headquarters in the capital of Belgrade.

Although it operated with more restraint than secret police agencies in the communist states of Eastern Europe, the UDBA was a feared tool of control. It is alleged that the UDBA was responsible for the "elimination" of hundreds of enemies of the state within Yugoslavia and internationally (estimated at about 200 assassinations and kidnappings). Elimination targets varied from people such as the Ustaše Croat fascist leader Vjekoslav Luburić in Spain, to Croatian emigrant writer Bruno Bušić and Serbian emigrant writer Dragiša Kašiković, although war criminals have to be distinguished from those assassinated only for dissent or political reasons.

With the breakup of Yugoslavia, the breakaway republics went on to form their own secret police agencies, while the Serbian State Security Directorate kept its UDBA-like name.

== Name ==
The agency was founded in March 1946 as a result of the Department for Protection of the People (OZNA) splitting into two branches. The Directorate of State Security was one of them and other was the Counterintelligence Service (KOS). In Yugoslavia, its name in Serbo-Croatian was Uprava državne bezbednosti ("Управа државне безбедности" in the Serbian Cyrillic script).

From this was derived the acronym "UDB", or, less formally and accurately: UDBA. UDBA was the most common colloquial name for the organization throughout its history, including in emigrant circles, within socialist Yugoslavia and its successor states, despite it being the official name only until 1966.

In 1966, with the political downfall of its hardliner chief, Aleksandar Ranković, the organization was renamed to the "State Security Service" (Služba državne bezbednosti), with the corresponding acronym SDB. Afterwards, it was (at least formally) decentralized into 8 semi-independent organizations each answering to an individual federal entity.

== Functions ==
UDBA formed a major part of the Yugoslav intelligence services from 1946 to 1991, and was primarily responsible for internal state security. After 1946 the UDBA underwent numerous security and intelligence changes due to topical issues at that time, including: fighting gangs; protection of the economy; Cominform/Informbiro; and bureaucratic aspirations.

In 1945 and 1946, for instance, the UDBA was organized into districts. In 1950, when the administrative-territorial units were abolished as authorities, the UDBA was reorganized again. During this period the intelligence and security activities concentrated less on intelligence and more on internal security. There was an emphasis on collectivism, brotherhood, social harmony, loyalty, and tolerance towards those with different views. Deviation from this set of values became an immediate issue for security services.

Later, the use of force was mitigated and when the process of "decentralization of people's power" began, intelligence and security services underwent further reorganization in order to decentralise power and increase effectiveness. At the plenum of the Central Committee in July 1966, the political leadership accused the SDB of hindering reforms towards self-administration. As a result, the SDB was decentralized, its personnel reduced (especially on the federal level) and control commissions established. New regulations were issued, strengthening the independent initiative of the state security services of the six Yugoslav republics and the autonomous provinces. The SDB was deprived of executive functions and entrusted with identifying and preventing hostile activities.

The Act on Internal Affairs and the Decree on Organization of State Internal Affairs Secretariat regulated the intelligence security authority as the prerogative of the State Security Directorate within the Ministry of the Interior. The following reorganization addressed issues relating to the competence of the federation (state security, cross-border traffic, foreign citizens, passports, introduction and dissemination of foreign press, and federal citizenship).

== Structure ==
Intelligence and security activity was organized in the following manner:

- After OZNA (Одељење заштите народа / Odeljenje zaštite naroda) (En:Department for the People's Protection) was abolished, intelligence activity was divided among various federal ministries: the Federal Ministry of the Interior by the State Security Administration, and the Federal Ministry of Foreign Affairs by the Service for Research and Documentation (SID) which collected foreign political information; military-defense intelligence was handled by the GS 2nd Department - KOS (Kontraobaveštajna služba / Контраобавештајна служба / Counterintelligence Service) of Yugoslav People's Army (JLA).
- SDB in the republics was not autonomous, but was tied to the federal service which co-ordinated the work and issued instructions.
- State security was regulated by secret legislation (secret Official Gazette), which prescribed the use of special operations. The SDB performed house searches, covert interceptions inside the premises, telecommunications interception, covert surveillance of people, and covert interception of letters and other consignments.
- Of primary interest to the SDB was domestic security; identifying and obstructing activities of the "domestic enemy" (i.e. the "bourgeois rightwing", clericalists, members of the Cominform, nationalists, and separatists). Intelligence work abroad was deemed less important and was under federal control.
- The SDB was a "political police", answerable to the party organization from which it received its guidelines and to which it reported. The SDB was so deeply rooted in the political system that one of its tasks was the preparation of "Political Security Assessments"; that is, assessments on literally all spheres of life.
- During its activity, the SDB enjoyed a wide range of power, including classical police powers (identifications, interrogations, and arrests).
- The SDB organization was constantly changing and making improvements, but it remained tied to the central unit in republic capitals and smaller working groups in the field. All information and data flowed into the central unit in the capitals and sent on from there to the users. Field groups had working contacts with the local authorities, but did not answer to them.

=== Ethnic composition ===
The ethnic composition of state security employees in socialist Yugoslavia differed from the composition of the general population of the country. Ethnic Serbs and Montenegrins made up a substantially higher proportion of the SDB than their share of the national population. Conversely, ethnic Croats, Slovenes, Albanians, and ethnic Muslims were heavily underrepresented among state security personnel. The disproportionately large representation of Serbs and Montenegrins in the security apparatus was partly due to large participation of those ethnic groups in the partisan resistance during World War II, as political and wartime service were important criteria for joining UDBA in the postwar period. Additionally, Croats and Slovenes in SFR Yugoslavia were more inclined to seek employment in nongovernmental and private sector careers than their Serb or Montenegrin counterparts.

Ethnic composition of the Federal State Security Service (SDB) in 1967 and 1989, compared with Yugoslav census figures
Ethnic group	Federal SDB, 1967 (%)	Yugoslav population, 1971 (%)	Federal SDB, 1989 (%)	Yugoslav population, 1981 (%)
Serbs	68.40	39.7	61.0	36.3
Montenegrins	9.95	2.5	12.0	2.6
Croats	8.94	22.1	2.0	19.7
Yugoslavs	5.15	1.3	18.0	5.4
Macedonians	4.46	5.8	4.0	6.0
Slovenes	2.75	8.2	1.0	7.8
Albanians	—	6.4	1.0	7.7
Other or unspecified	0.35	14.0	1.0	14.5
Total	100.00	100.0	100.0	100.0

== Activities ==
=== 1946–1986 period ===
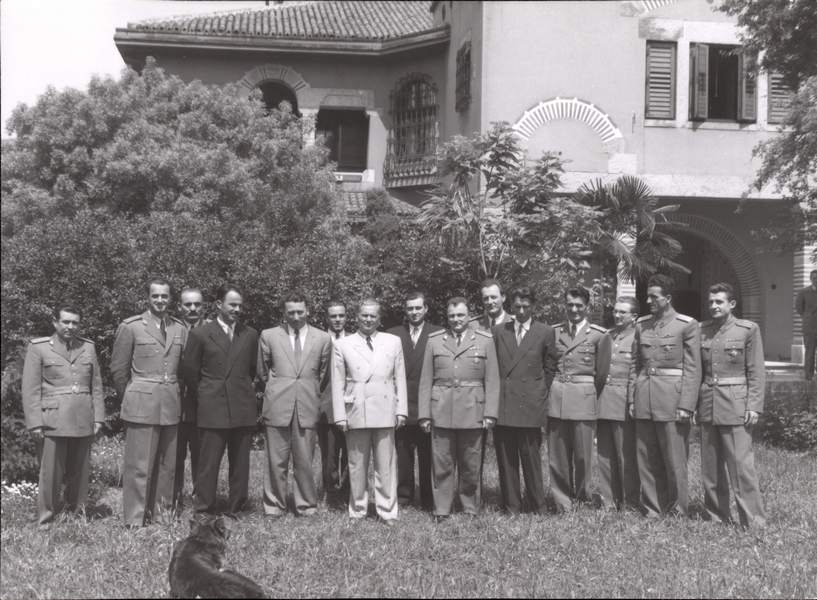
Josip Broz Tito with representatives of UDBA, 1951.

One of the first successful actions of UDBA was operation Gvardijan, that denied Božidar Kavran the chance to infiltrate ex-Ustasha groups in order to start an uprising against Yugoslavia, eventually capturing Kavran himself.

From 1963 to 1974, security intelligence services dealt with a series of domestic and foreign political events. At home, there were political confrontations both before and after the 1966 plenum, including liberal outbreaks and massive leftist student demonstrations in Belgrade in 1968, the Hrvatsko proljeće (Croatian Spring) or "MASPOK" (mass movement) in Croatia in 1971, a nationalist incursion of the Bugojno group in the Raduša area (1972), and a revival of nationalism in Yugoslav republics. The most significant event abroad was the invasion of the Warsaw Pact troops of Czechoslovakia in 1968.

In 1967, republics gained control and greater influence over their individual security organs and intelligence security services with the adoption of the first act on internal affairs of the individual republics. According to this act, internal affairs were handled directly by the municipal administrative bodies and the secretariats of internal affairs of each republic or by their provincial bodies.

The State Security Service (SDB) was defined by law as a professional service within the Republic Secretariat of Internal Affairs (RSUP). Naturally, most of its competence remained within federal institutions, as prescribed by the Act on Handling Internal Affairs Under Competence of Federal Administrative Bodies (1971), which determined that the federal secretariat of internal affairs would coordinate the work of the SDB in the republics and provinces. Further steps were taken with the transformation of the state administration, adoption of the Federal Act on State Administration (1978), and the Republic Act (1978). The newly adopted act on internal affairs tasked the Republic Secretariat of Internal Affairs (RSUP) with state security issues, which then became RSUP issues and were no longer given special handling "at the RSUP". This resolution remained in force until the 1991 modifications of the act on internal affairs.

=== Post–1986 period ===
The role of intelligence and security changed after 1986, when a different mentality reigned within the Party and the processes of democratization were initiated. Intelligence security agencies came under attack, and there were public critiques of the SDB. The party organization was abolished in the SDB and the first attempts to introduce parliamentary control began.

The first democratic multi party elections in 1990, which enhanced the process of democratization, reverberated within the Federal Secretariat of Internal Affairs (SSUP) and Federal State Security Service (SSDB), which were fighting to maintain control over the individual SDBs in the republics, which became increasingly disjointed. Although still legally connected to the federal bodies, there was a raised awareness of operations in their particular republic. Some professional cadres, especially those in the domestic field began leaving the service. Conflict was increasing, and SDB archives were being systematically destroyed. In its search for new roles, the SDBs also began to limit information they were sending to the SSDB. They ultimately restricted their information to foreign intelligence services.

Along with the weakening of the SSDB position, attempts were made by the Yugoslav People's Army Security Service or KOS to strengthen its own strongholds in the different republics and in the individual SDBs. The attempts failed because they depended upon cadres of other nationalities still employed in the SDBs but who had no access to data bases and had no decision-making power due to their "Yugoslav" orientation.

== List of notable targeted people ==
Year	Country	Person Assassinated
1946	Italy	Ivo Protulipac
1960	Argentina	Dinka Domančinović
1969	West Germany	Nahid Kulenović
1969	Spain	Vjekoslav (Maks) Luburić
1977	USA	Dragiša Kašiković
1978	France	Bruno Bušić
1982	West Germany	Jusuf Gërvalla
1983	West Germany	Stjepan Đureković
1990	Belgium	Enver Hadri

== See also ==
- OZNA
- KOS
- Eastern Bloc politics
- Operation Gvardijan
- Attempted assassination of Nikola Štedul
