= List of prisoners of Jasenovac =

Nazi concentration camp prisoners

List of prisoners of Jasenovac concentration camp (1941–1945). Bolded names in caps and italics indicate those listed below who survived the camp and the war.

== List ==
- **Zaim Topčić**, writer, communist, Bosnian
- Josip Abramović (1882–1942), lawyer and activist, Croatian Jewish
- Petar Baćović, Chetnik commander
- Ante Bakotić (1921–1945), communist, Croat
- Luka Baletić (1902–1945), Chetnik commander, Serb
- Pavle Bastajić (1890–1941), Bosnian revolutionary and Soviet agent, Serb
- Julia Batino, Bitola-born Jewish antifascist and women's rights activist.
- Jovo Bećir (1870–1942), brigadier and Yugoslav lieutenant, Montenegrin
- **Egon Berger**, author of 44 months in Jasenovac, Jewish
- Milo Bošković (1911–1944), doctor and communist, Montenegrin
- Slavko Brill (1900–1943), Croatian sculptor and ceramics artist, Jewish.
- Marijan Čavić (1915–1941), communist, Croat
- Smail-aga Ćemalović (1884–1945), Islamist, Bosnian
- **Ante Ciliga**, Croatian politician, writer and publisher. — Ciliga, a former Communist turned "ardent nationalist", was released within a relatively short period of time. Ciliga himself was quoted as saying: "I was for the ustasha (sic) state, I was for the Croatian state. And I defend that thesis. The ustasha (sic) state needed to be reformed, not destroyed."
- Dragutin Cvijak (1884–1941), Croatian lawyer, Jewish
- **Natko Devčić**, composer, Croat
- Nada Dimić (1923–1942), Partisan, Serb
- Zija Dizdarević, writer and Partisan, Bosnian Muslim
- Jakov Dugandžić (1905–1941), communist and Partisan, Croat
- Pavle Đurišić, Chetnik commander, Serb
- Mavro Frankfurter (1875–1942), chief rabbi in Vinkovci
- **Grgo Gamulin**, art historian, university professor and writer, Croat
- Izidor Gross (1860–1942), chess master and hazzan of the Karlovac Jewish community.
- Boris Hanžeković, Croatian athlete; murdered by the guards during the 22 April 1945 mass inmate breakout.
- Slavko Hirsch, Croatian physician, founder and director of the Epidemiological Institute in Osijek, Jewish.
- Žiga Hirschler, Jewish composer, music critic and publicist.
- Daniel Kabiljo, Bosnian artist, Jewish.
- Grgur Karlovčan (1913–1942), author, Croat
- Marijan Krajačić (1905–1942), Partisan, Croat
- Walter Kraus (1917–1945), painter, Austria-born Serb, Jewish
- Mirko Lalatović (1904–1945), Yugoslav major and pilot and Chetnik commander, Serb
- **Vladko Maček**, Croatian politician; president of the Croatian Peasant Party.
- Vukašin Mandrapa (died 1942/1943), proclaimed Serbian Orthodox saint-martyr.
- Mihovil Pavlek Miškina, poet, short story writer and politician, Croat
- Edmund Moster, Jewish entrepreneur, industrialist and co-founder of the "Penkala-Moster Company" (now TOZ).
- Leo Müller, Croatian industrialist and entrepreneur, Jewish.
- Daniel Ozmo, Bosnian–Serbian painter and printmaker, Jewish.
- Salamon Papo (1901–?), Bosnian painter, Jewish.
- Kiprijan Relić (1904–1941), Serbian Orthodox hieromonk.
- Rod Riffler (1909–1941), Croatian dancer and choreographer, Jewish.
- Ivan Sabljak (1919–1944), Yugoslav Partisan
- Armin Schreiner, industrialist, banker and activist, Jewish
- Vlado Singer, Croatian politician and member of the Ustaše movement (a convert to Catholicism from Judaism).
- Mitar Trifunović Učo (1880–1941), Bosnian socialist activist and Partisan, Serb
- Simon Ungar, Osijek rabbi
- Oton Vinski, Croatian banker, Jewish.
- Dragiša Vasić, Chetnik commander, Serb.
- Leib Weissberg, Slavonski Brod rabbi.
- Nikola Zagorac (1910–1941), Serbian Orthodox priest, Croatian Serb.
