= Lepoglava concentration camp =

Lepoglava
- Concentration camp
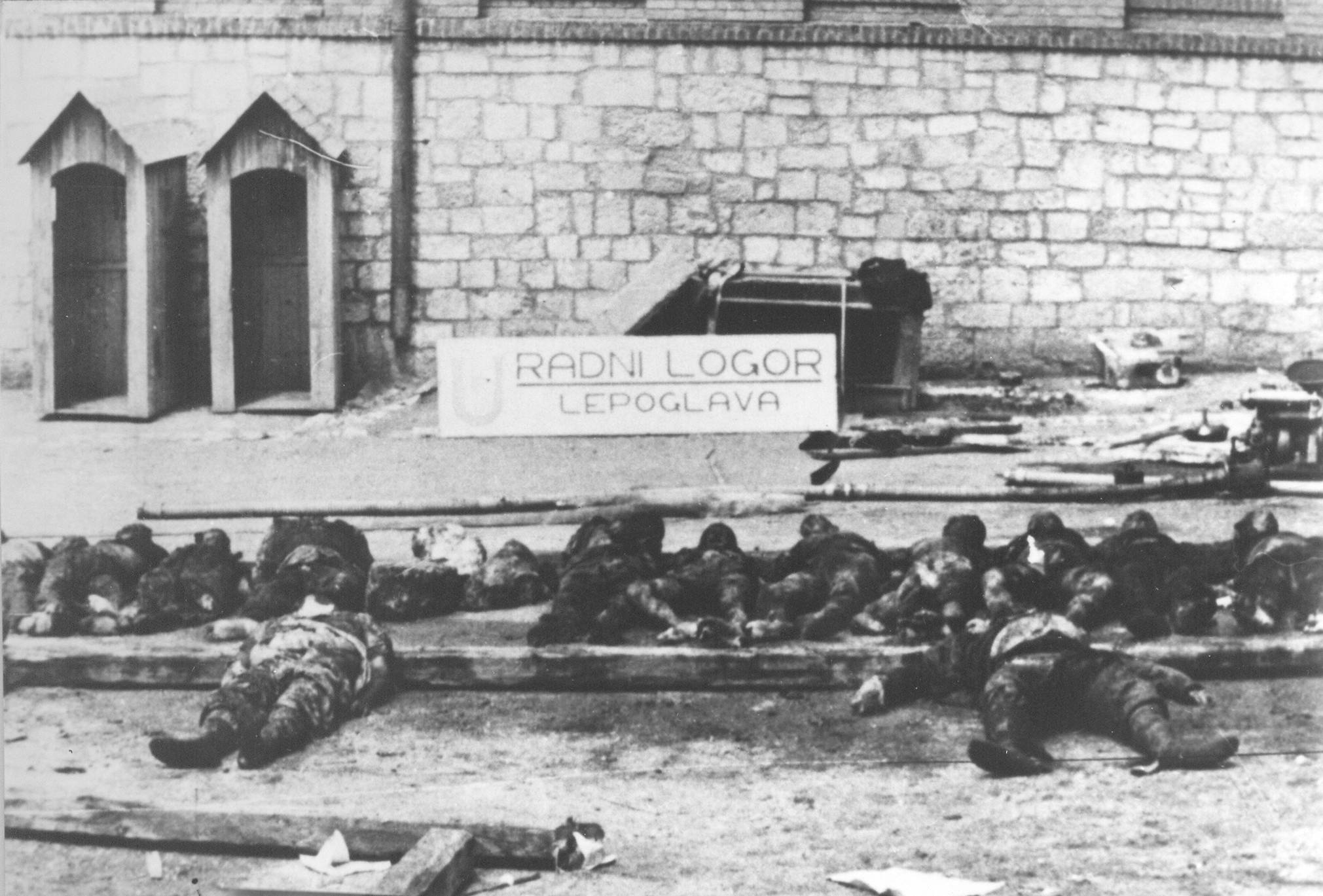
- Corpses of inmates murdered at Lepoglava.

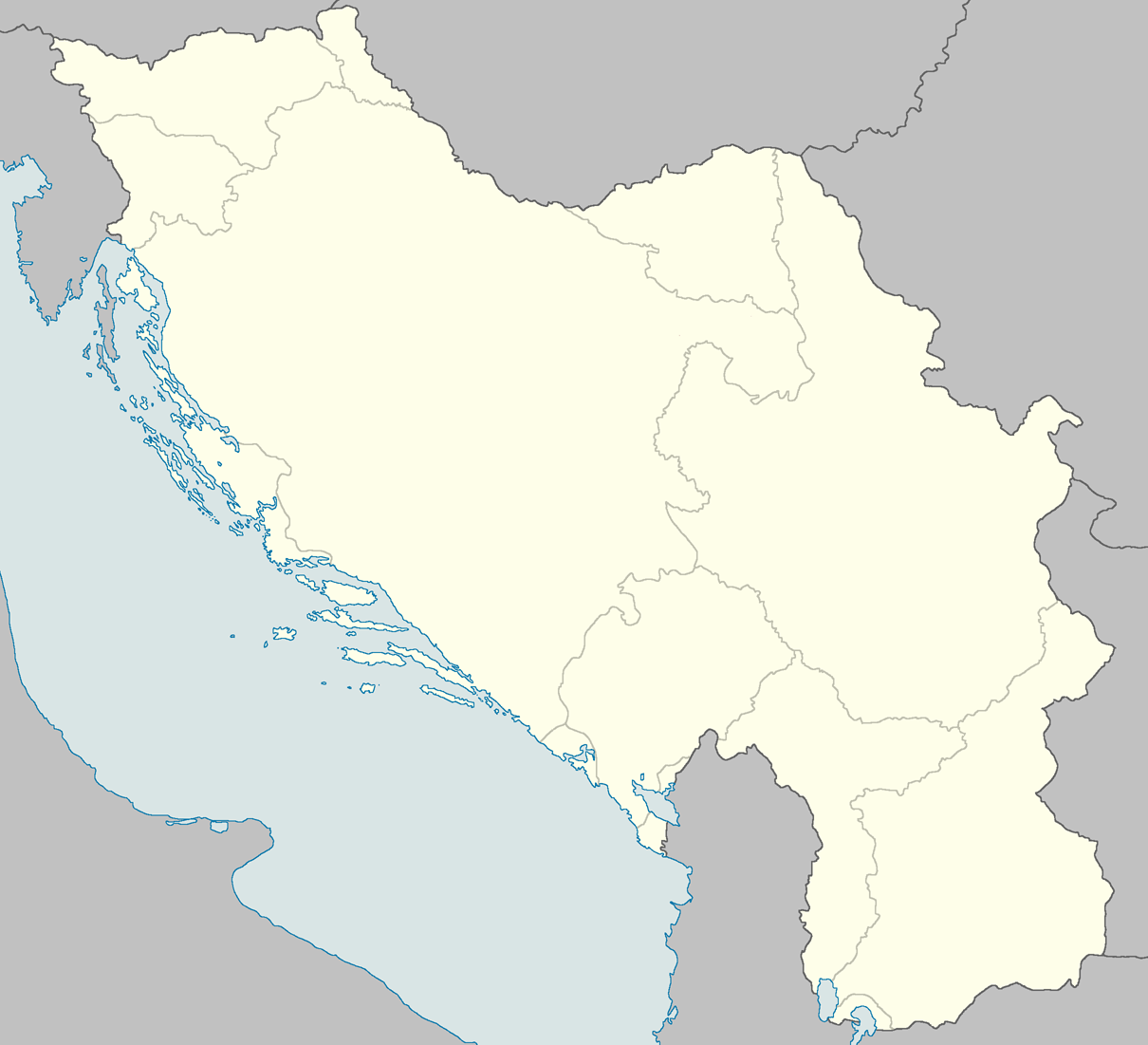
- Location within Occupied Yugoslavia Location within Croatia
- Coordinates: 46.2105°N 16.0355°E
- Commandant: Mirko Cvitkovac, Ljubo Miloš, Miro Natijević, and Nikola Gađić
- Killed: around 1,000

The Lepoglava concentration camp was a concentration camp in the Independent State of Croatia during World War II. It was located 25 km southwest of Varaždin and operated by Ustaše, a Croatian fascist, In July 1943, it was briefly captured by Yugoslav Partisans.

In March and April 1945, about 1,300 Lepoglava inmates were transported to the Jasenovac concentration camps and killed. On 30 April 1945, Ustaše murdered 961 young people, mostly students, near the camp.

== Background ==
The Lepoglava prison was established in Austria-Hungary in the 19th century and continued to serve as a prison in the nations that succeeded Austria-Hungary, including Yugoslavia (1918–41) and Croatia (1992–present). During World War II, it was transformed into a concentration camp.

== During World War II ==
The Lepoglava camp had similar atrocity rates as other concentration camps in Croatia, and a similar organizational structure to the Jasenovac extermination camp. Administrative, Labor, Economy, and Security departments each had a separate commandant. The commandants were Mirko Cvitkovac, Ljubo Miloš, Miro Natijević, and Nikola Gađić.

The camp's first prisoners included Jews who, after their arrival, were supported by food, clothing, and medicine from the Jewish community of Zagreb.

=== Partisan takeover ===
In July and August 1943, Yugoslav Partisan units requested approval from the Croatian Partisan headquarters to attack Jasenovac extermination camp and release its inmates. The headquarters refused the requests but proposed attacking Lepoglava instead. This proposition was accepted.

The Partisan forces captured Lepoglava on 14 July 1943, intentionally on Bastille Day. They first attacked the camp with artillery and then charged it with infantry. On the day it was captured, the commandant of the camp was Mirko Cvitkovac. About 15% of its inmates were Communists who subsequently joined the Partisans.

This was the Partisans' most important action in northwestern Croatia.

=== Recapture by the Ustaše Surveillance Service ===
After the Partisans took over the camp, Croatian forces recaptured it and put it under the control of Bureau 3 of the Ustaše Surveillance Service. Ljubo Miloš was made commandant at the beginning of 1944.

In 1945, Ustaše decided to close the camp and move its inmates to Jasenovac because they considered Lepoglava insecure. Some 1,300 inmates were transported to Jasenovac, where all of them were killed, except for around 50 who managed to escape during the transport. On 30 April 1945, Ustaše killed about 80 inmates who remained in the camp, as well as 961 young people, mostly students at a nearby facility that is now known as Memorial Cemetery (Croatian: Spomen groblje).

== Sources ==
- Megargee, Geoffrey P.; White, Joseph R. (29 May 2018). The United States Holocaust Memorial Museum Encyclopedia of Camps and Ghettos, 1933–1945, vol. III: Camps and Ghettos under European Regimes Aligned with Nazi Germany. Indiana University Press. ISBN 978-0-253-02386-5.
- Stopar, Vlado (1959). Hrvatsko Zagorje u narodnooslobodilačkoj borbi. Epoha.
- Miletić, Antun (1986). Koncentracioni logor Jasenovac 1941-1945: dokumenta. Narodna knjiga. ISBN 9788633100250.
- Dedijer, Vladimir (1 May 1990). The War Diaries of Vladimir Dedijer: From November 28, 1942, to September 10, 1943. University of Michigan Press. ISBN 978-0-472-10109-2.
- Peršen, Mirko (1963). Lepoglava. Epoha.
- Dedijer, Vladimir (1987). Vatikan i Jasenovac: dokumenti. Rad. ISBN 9788609000751.
- MS (1974). Proceedings in history. Odeljenje za društvene nauke, Matica srpska.
- Kožar, Boris (1964). Lepoglava, 1943-1963. Novinsko izdavačko i štamparsko poduzeće.
- Dedijer, Vladimir (1970). Od 28 novembra 1942 do 10 novembra 1943. Prosveta.
- KS (1988). Kaj. Kajkavsko Spravišče.
- Komarica, Slavko; Odić, Slavko F. (2008). Zašto Jasenovac nije oslobođen. Iros. ISBN 978-953-6300-43-3.
