= Izidor Gross =

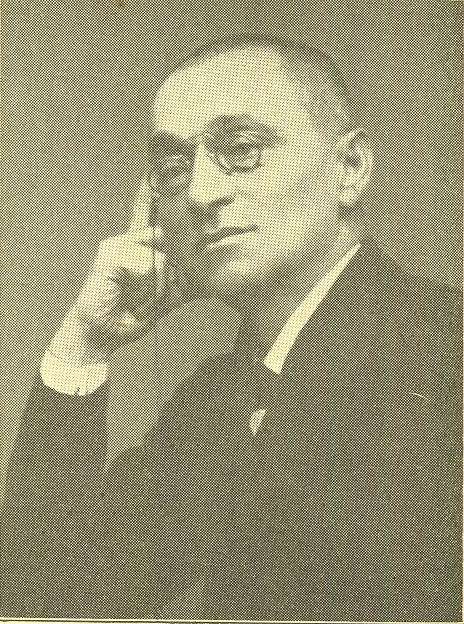
- Born: 25 June 1860; Kislőd, Austrian Empire, (now Hungary)
- Died: 1942 (aged 82); Jasenovac concentration camp
- Cause of death: Murdered in Holocaust
- Spouse: Regina Gross
- Children: Herman Gross (son)

Izidor Gross (25 July 1866 – 1942) was a Croatian chess master and hazzan.

== Background ==
Gross was born into a Jewish family in Kislőd, Hungary on 25 July 1866. In 1891 he settled in Karlovac, Croatia where he served as a hazzan at Karlovac Synagogue. Apart from work at the Karlovac Jewish community, Gross was an avid chess master and notable writer about chess problems and the game itself. He is one of the founders of the Karlovac chess club in 1908 and Croatian chess federation in 1912. Gross published articles about chess problems in various domestic - foreign magazines and newspapers. In 1909 he published a book Šahovska abeceda (Chess alphabet). He composed direct mates, with some incursions in helpmates. Gross organized in Karlovac, in 1912, first international chess tournament in the Balkans. As a Jew Gross was arrested and deported to Jasenovac concentration camp where he was killed in 1942 during the Holocaust, together with his son Herman and daughter in law Julia.

== Works ==
- Rochade und Notation bei Ibn Esra, Druck von T. Schatzky, Breslau (1900)
- Povijest šaha, Knjigotiskara M. Fogina, Karlovac (1912)
- Problemi Karlovačkog medunarodnog šahovskog turnira, Knjigotiskara Dragutina Hauptfelda, Karlovac (1913)
- Šahovska abeceda, Knjižara St. Kugli, Zagreb (1923)
- 150 izabranih problema, Knjigotiskara M. Fogina, Karlovac (1936)
- Humorističke crtice iz jevrejskog života, Knjigotiskara M. Fogina, Karlovac (1938)

== Bibliography ==
- Schäfer, Hans (1930). Internationale galerie moderner problem komponisten. Vienna.
