= Cincarević =

- Language: Serbo-Croatian

Other names
- Variant forms: Cincar, Cincar-Marković, Cincarovski

Cincarević is a Serbian surname, derived from the word cincar, meaning "Aromanian".

At least 1 individual with the surname died at the Jasenovac concentration camp.

It may refer to:

- Biljana Cincarević, Serbian contemporary painter
