= Antun Miletić =

Croatian-Serbian historian (born 1931)

- Антун Милетић
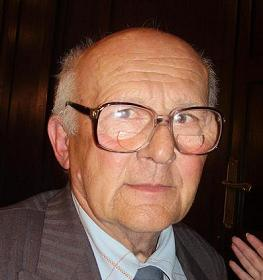
- Miletić in 2008
- Born: 30 June 1931 (age 95); Slavonski Brod, Kingdom of Yugoslavia

Academic work
- Discipline: World War II in Yugoslavia
- Institutions: Institute of Military History in Belgrade; Serbian Academy of Sciences and Arts

Antun Miletić (Serbian Cyrillic: Антун Милетић; born 30 June 1931) is a Yugoslav and Serbian historian.

== Biography ==
Miletić was born in Slavonski Brod, Croatia in 1931. He has been living in Belgrade since 28 November 1946. He spent five years as a student of the Military Academy and served as an officer of the Yugoslav People's Army until 31 December 1990, when he retired in the rank of colonel.

In the late 1970s, as chief archivist of the Institute of Military History in Belgrade, Miletić was tasked with preparing a run-down of the history of the Jasenovac concentration camp for a new memorial at Gradina Donja headed by a Sarajevo-based team. Miletić scoured the archives of the Institute for camp-related documents and continued his work at the behest of the Jasenovac memorial site, who showed interest in its contents. The result was the publication in the mid-1980s of some 400 documents over three volumes published jointly by the Jasenovac Memorial Area and Narodna Knjiga, a Belgrade publishing house. The work is considered a leading monograph on the camp. It includes material on the camp's administration and documents from former inmates, Ustaše guards and official commissions that investigated war crimes. Miletić does not provide his own estimates on the number of people killed in the camp, but appears to agree with the 600,000 to 700,000 figures given during the Yugoslav communist era. In 2010 Miletić estimated that a minimum of 146,401 or 146,248 people died at Jasenovac based on varying name lists and numbers.

Miletić was one of the most active members of the committee of the Serbian Academy of Sciences and Arts for the collection of documents on the Genocide against Serbs and other peoples in Yugoslavia in the 20th century, from 1986 to 1994, when the committee ceased its work. With his colleague Vladimir Dedijer, Miletić wrote about what he saw as a Genocide of Bosnian Muslims committed by the Chetniks during World War II in a volume entitled Genocid nad Muslimanima published in 1990.

He was a member of the Historical committee of the Russell's Tribunal for Yugoslavia and is a founding member and Chairman of the Association for Research into Genocide and the war crimes, founded in Belgrade. In 2002 Miletić was elected a member of the Directors of the Jasenovac Research Institute. Miletić has published 24 books, over 60 papers and dozens of articles and serials in daily and weekly press. He has also participated in numerous other projects as collaborator, editor, reviewer and member of editorial boards.

== Publications ==
- "Zbornik dokumenata i podataka o NOR-u", Tom XII, Dokumenta Nemačkog Rajha 1941. Belgrade, VII, 1973; Dokumenta Nemačkog Rajha 1943. Belgrade, VII, 1978;
- "Koncentracioni logor Jasenovac 1941-1945. Dokumenta“, knj. I-II, 1986, knj. III, 1987, knj. IV, 2007, str. 2500, Narodna knjiga, Gambit, Belgrade, Jagodina;
- " Zbornik dokumenata i podataka o narodnoosvobodilačkom ratu naroda Jugoslavije", Tom XV, knjiga I, Belgrade, VII, 1986, with Godo Agneš;
- "Aprilski rat-Dokumenta 1941", knjiga II, VII, 1987;
- "Ustaška fabrika smrti 1941-1945", Belgrade, VIZ, 1988;
- "Proterivanje Srba sa ognjišta, 1941-1945", with Vladimir Dedijer, Belgrade, Prosveta, 1989;
- "Genocid nad Muslimanima, 1941-1945: Zbornik dokumenata i svjedodenja" with Vladimir Dedijer, Svjetlost, Sarajevo 1990;
- "Protiv zaborava i tabua: Jasenovac 1941-1991“, with Vladimir Dedijer, 535 pp, IP Pregres, Sarajevo, 1991;
- "Brzojavka za Valdhajma-Operacija za spas ratnog zločinca", Belgrade, 1993. i drugo izdanje Čačak, 1994;
- "Istorija holokausta Roma“, with Rajko Đurić, 456 pp, Politika ad, Belgrade, 2008;
