= Petar Brzica =

Croat friar and mass murderer (born c. 1917)

Petar "Pero" Brzica
- Born: Petar Brzica c. 1917
- Disappeared: 1945 (aged 28); Independent State of Croatia
- Occupations: Ustaše Lieutenant, Nazi collaborator and war criminal
- Known for: Mass murder during the Holocaust

Petar "Pero" Brzica (born c. 1917) was a Croatian Franciscan of the "Order of Friars Minor" who became a mass murderer during the Ustaše regime. He committed his atrocities at the Jasenovac concentration camp during World War II. He personally murdered up to 1,360 inmates at the camp.

== Background ==
Before the war, Brzica was a scholarship student at the Franciscan college of Široki Brijeg in Herzegovina and a member of The Great Brotherhood of Crusaders, an organization part of the Croatian Catholic movement. He spent some time studying law in Zagreb where he became a Ustaše Youth member, later becoming a member of the fascist Ustaša government (1941–45) and one of the guards in the Jasenovac concentration camp.

As a member of Ustaša, he held the rank of lieutenant. He won a contest in which he used a curve-bladed knife, also called a srbosjek ("Serb-cutter"), to kill newly arrived concentration camp prisoners. Brzica boasted of winning the contest by killing the largest number of prisoners – 1,360 people one night alone. Other sources set Brzica's "record" at a lower number, between 670 and 1,100.

== See also ==
- Independent State of Croatia
- Ivica Matković (Ustaša)
- List of fugitives from justice who disappeared
- Ljubo Miloš
- Miroslav Filipović

== Sources ==
- Bulajić, Milan (1994). The Role of the Vatican in the break-up of the Yugoslav State: The Mission of the Vatican in the Independent State of Croatia. Ustashi Crimes of Genocide. Belgrade: Stručna knjiga.
- Bulajić, Milan (2002). Jasenovac: The Jewish-Serbian Holocaust (the role of the Vatican) in Nazi-Ustasha Croatia (1941-1945). Belgrade: Fund for Genocide Research, Stručna knjiga. ISBN 9788641902211.
- Crimes in the Jasenovac Camp. Zagreb: State Commission of Croatia for the investigation of the crimes of the occupation forces and their collaborators. 1946.
