= Ivica Matković =

Ivica Matković may refer to:

- Ivica Matković (football coach) (born 1953), Croatian football coach
- Ivica Matković (Ustasha) (1913–1945), administrator at the Jasenovac World War II concentration camp in Croatia
