= Jovo Bećir =

Montenegrin Serb general killed in Jasenovac death camp

General Jovo Bećir
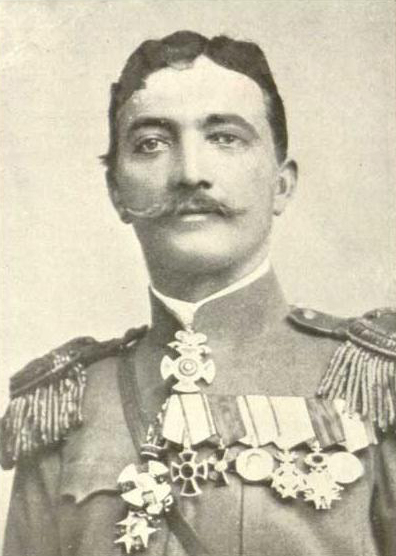
- Born: 14 September 1870; Njeguši, Principality of Montenegro
- Died: 1942 (aged 71–72); Jasenovac concentration camp, Independent State of Croatia
- Military career
- Allegiance: Principality of Montenegro; Kingdom of Montenegro; Kingdom of Yugoslavia
- Branch: Army
- Service years: 1890–1922; 1941
- Rank: General
- Unit: Herzegovina Detachment
- Conflicts: First Balkan War; Siege of Scutari; World War I; Battle of Mojkovac (POW); World War II; Invasion of Yugoslavia (executed)

Jovo Bećir (Serbian Cyrillic: Јово Бећир; 14 September 1870 – 1942) was a Montenegrin brigadier general and a colonel of the Royal Yugoslav Army.

== Biography ==
Bećir was a brigadier general in the Royal Montenegrin Army during the Montenegrin Campaign of World War I. On 25 January 1916, he was one of the signatories of the Montenegrin capitulation after the Battle of Mojkovac.

He was a colonel in the Army of the Kingdom of Yugoslavia in the interwar period. Although retired, he was activated at the beginning of the Invasion of Yugoslavia in 1941. After the defeat of the Yugoslav forces, he was captured and then released due to the intervention of Queen Jelena, but after he rejected to take part in the Italian governorate of Montenegro, he was again captured in late 1941 by Croatian fascist units known as the Ustaše and taken to Jasenovac concentration camp where he was killed in 1942.
