= Kislőd =

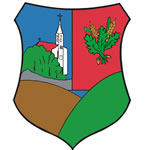
- Coat of arms

- Location of Veszprém county in Hungary

- Location of Kislőd
- Coordinates: 47.14553°N 17.62238°E
- Country: Hungary
- County: Veszprém

Area
  - Total: 38.18 km^{2} (14.74 sq mi)

Population (2004)
  - Total: 1,319
  - Density: 34.54/km^{2} (89.5/sq mi)
- Time zone: UTC+1 (CET)
  - Summer (DST): UTC+2 (CEST)
- Postal code: 8446
- Area code: 88

Kislőd is a village in Veszprém county, Hungary.

== Gallery ==
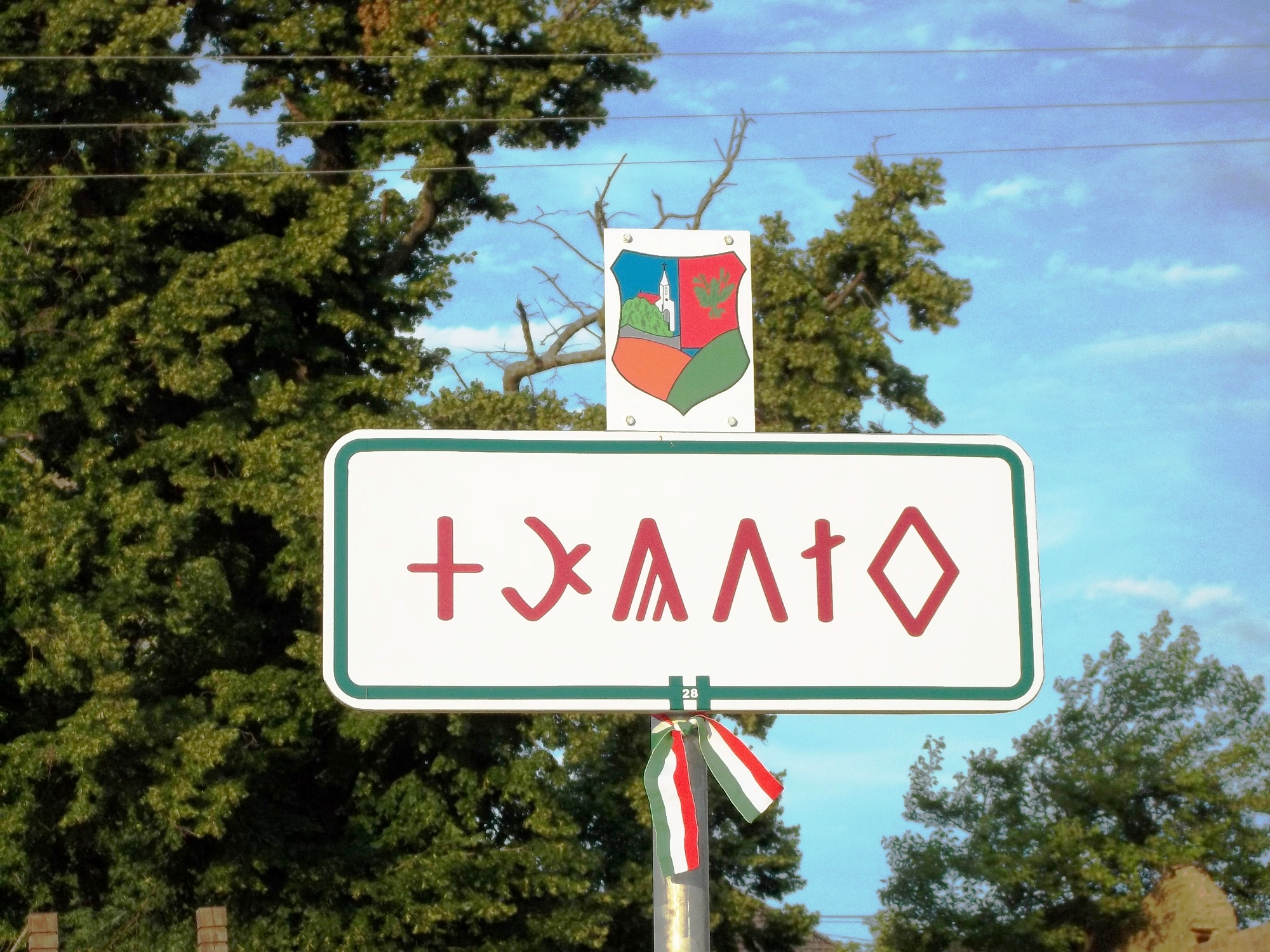
Coat of arms above the city limit sign (traditional Hungarian script)
