= Ljubo Miloš =

Jasenovac camp commandant and war criminal

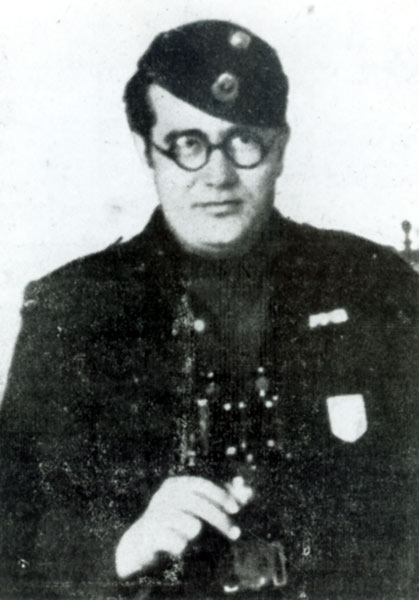
- Miloš in Ustashe uniform
- Born: Ljubomir Miloš; 25 February 1919; Bosanski Šamac, Kingdom of Serbs, Croats and Slovenes
- Died: 20 August 1948 (aged 29); Zagreb, PR Croatia, FPR Yugoslavia
- Cause of death: Execution by hanging
- Military career
- Allegiance: Independent State of Croatia; Nazi Germany
- Branch: Ustaše; Croatian Home Guard
- Service years: 1941–45
- Commands: Commandant of Jasenovac concentration camp and Lepoglava concentration camp

Ljubomir "Ljubo" Miloš (25 February 1919 – 20 August 1948) was a Croatian public official who was a member of the Ustaše of the Independent State of Croatia (NDH) during World War II. He served as commandant of the Jasenovac concentration camp on several occasions and was responsible for various atrocities committed there during the war. He was responsible for the deaths of thousands.

He fled Yugoslavia in May 1945 and sought refuge in Austria. In 1947, he returned to Yugoslavia with the intention of starting an anti-communist uprising. He was soon arrested by Yugoslav authorities and charged with war crimes. Miloš was found guilty on all counts and hanged in August 1948.

Ljubo Miloš has been described as an "extremely sanguine fanatic and sadist. While Matkovic Ivica was a refined killer, Milos Ljubo was a brutal butcher." He is noted as being "one of the worst Ustase murderers".

== Early life ==
Miloš was born in Bosanski Šamac on 25 February 1919. Miloš attended primary school in Orašje and Bosanski Brod and finished secondary school in Subotica. He stayed in Subotica and worked as a municipal clerk.

== World War II ==
On 6 April 1941, Axis forces invaded Yugoslavia. Poorly equipped and poorly trained, the Royal Yugoslav Army was quickly defeated. The country was then dismembered and the extreme Croat nationalist and fascist Ante Pavelić, who had been in exile in Benito Mussolini's Italy, was appointed Poglavnik (leader) of an Ustaše-led Croatian state – the Independent State of Croatia (often called the NDH, from the Croatian: Nezavisna Država Hrvatska). The NDH combined almost all of modern-day Croatia, all of modern-day Bosnia and Herzegovina and parts of modern-day Serbia into an "Italian-German quasi-protectorate". NDH authorities, led by the Ustaše militia, subsequently implemented genocidal policies against the Serb, Jewish and Romani population living within the borders of the new state.

Miloš arrived in Zagreb in June 1941 and met with his first cousin, Ustaše commander Vjekoslav Luburić. Luburić made him his right-hand man and used his influence to get Miloš a position within the Ustaše Supervisory Service (Croatian: Ustaška nadzorna služba, UNS), which ran the Jasenovac concentration camp. In October, Miloš was named camp commander and promoted to the rank of First Lieutenant. Miloš was personally responsible for the safety of Croatian politician Vladko Maček during his imprisonment, from 15 October 1941 to 15 March 1942. Maček seeing Miloš, before going to bed, always made the sign of the cross, asked him if he "feared God's punishment" for the atrocities he committed in the camp. Miloš replied, "Say nothing to me. I know I will burn in hell for what I have done. But I will burn for Croatia."

Miloš was transferred to the Đakovo concentration camp in early 1942, but returned to Jasenovac and reassumed the position of camp commander in the spring. He seemed to compete with the other commanding officers in the camp to see who could torture and kill the most inmates. A witness reported that Miloš stabbed a man twice with a big knife due to the man hiding money. Another time Miloš took 25 prisoners from a line, grabbed a rifle and shot all of them. Miloš was often dressed in a white robe and pretended to be a doctor in front of sick inmates. He would sometimes take those applying to be hospitalized, line them up against a wall and slit their throats with a slaughtering knife. He seemed "very proud" of this "ritual slaughter of the [Jews]...". Witness Milan Flumiani recalled:

[As] soon as the seventeen of us arrived at Jasenovac, Ustaše beat us with rifle butts and took us to the Brick Factory, where Ljubo Miloš had already lined up two groups, while we arrived as a special third group. Maričić asked Ljubo Miloš, "who should I aim at first?", and Miloš replied, "where there’s more of them", and both of them pointed automatic rifles at the 40 men from the first two groups and shot them all. After that, he asked the first man from our group why he came here, and when that man replied that he was guilty of being born a Serb, he shot him on the spot. Then he picked out Laufer, a lawyer from Zagreb, and asked him what he was, and when he replied, he called him out like this — "I like lawyers very much, come closer" — and killed him right away. Then he found out that a third man was a doctor from Zagreb, and he ordered him to examine the first two men and to establish whether they were dead. When the doctor confirmed that they were, he turned to the fourth man and when he found out that he too was a doctor, he "forgave" the whole group.

Miloš also raised a wolfhound and trained it to assault inmates. During the summer of 1942, he travelled to Italy to complete a law enforcement course in Turin, but returned to the NDH after only ten days. In September, he returned to Jasenovac and assumed the role of assistant-camp commander. Troops under Miloš's command raided several villages near Jasenovac in October 1942, looted countless homes, arrested hundreds of Serb peasants and deported them to the camps. NDH authorities learned about the raids shortly after and arrested Miloš. He was not imprisoned long, as Luburić ordered his release on 23 December 1942. In January 1943, Miloš joined the Croatian Home Guard (Hrvatsko domobranstvo) and was stationed in Mostar. He returned to Zagreb in April 1943, where he remained until spring the following year. In September, he was named commander of Lepoglava prison.

A witness, Danon Jakob, reported about the killing of newly arrived victims on Christmas Day, stating that:

Matijevic Joso pushed the prisoners towards Ljubo Milos with a bayonet. Their hands were tied behind their backs. Each and every one of them Milos stabbed with a strong swing of a large butcher knife and slit their throats.

== Capture and death ==
By the end of World War II, Miloš had attained the rank of Major. He fled Yugoslavia at the beginning of May 1945, and withdrew through Austria to Allied-controlled northern Italy with help from the Roman Catholic church. He soon returned to Austria and established links with Croatian émigrés there. He illegally crossed the Yugoslav–Hungarian border in 1947 with the intention of infiltrating Croatia with anti-communist guerrillas known as Crusaders (križari). Miloš was arrested by Yugoslav authorities on 20 July 1947, charged with war crimes and tried the following year. During his trial, he confessed to killing Jasenovac inmates and testified that the Ustaše had drawn up plans for the extermination of Serbs long before 1941. Miloš was found guilty on all counts on 20 August 1948 and sentenced to death by the Supreme Court of the People's Republic of Croatia. He was hanged in Zagreb the same day.
