= Ivica Matković (Ustaša) =

Ustaša officer

Ivica Matković (1913–1945) was an Ustaša lieutenant colonel and the administrator of the Jasenovac concentration camp between January 1942 and March 1943, during World War II in Yugoslavia. During his tenure, most of the atrocities happened in the camp, and he was directly involved in the plannings and execution of those atrocities.

== Arrival at Jasenovac ==
Born in Zlarin, Matković arrived at the camp as early as December 1941 as the deputy of Vjekoslav Luburić before a massacre which took place on 25 December 1941.

In January 1942, he was appointed "administrator" of the camp and Ljubo Miloš was his deputy, the commander. Miloš was aided by Fra Miroslav Filipović, a Franciscan friar, who was chief guard, and Dominik "Hinko" Piccili and Tihomir Kordić. commanders of the labor force.

== Under the command of Matković ==
Matković was known for being a cold-blooded killer, who often amused himself by mocking his victims while killing them and prolonging their suffering.

The liquidations in the camp, previously held openly all around the camp grounds, were now organised in the form of systematic extermination: inmates had to pass selections and attend musters where inmates were hanged. Matković ordered Hinko Dominik Piccili to construct a crematorium. He would attend musters in the crematoria, and forced inmates to watch the hangings and not look away. He also initiated murder in Gradina, which would later become the main killing grounds of the complex.

=== Atrocities under Matković ===
- Liquidation of the Jasenovac "sanatorium": In the winter of 1941–42, rough conditions and exposure to the elements caused acute health impairment of the inmates of Jasenovac. Some 300 inmates were held in a barracks used as a "hospital", where gravely ill and feeble inmates were kept with no care. On 1 February 1942, 42 inmates were selected to exterior labor in the Jewish grave-digger group (group "D"). Upon returning to camp at 22:00, after digging graves, they were restricted from accessing the barracks due to custody. Later it became known that the patients were driven out of the barracks to be liquidated. Other witnesses present at the time confirmed this and claimed that such sort of practice later became standard, and the "sanatorium" would often be cleansed or that individuals were also selected there to be liquidated. The grave-diggers later learned that the graves they had dug were for relatives of the liquidated people.
- Hanging of five people in public on winter 1941–42: In the winter, inmates did hard labor on the embankment of the river, and were fed potatoes or "turnip soup". According to the State Commission investigation, which drove five hungry inmates to dig out raw potatoes, despite the threat of death; "Matković ordered all prisoners to line up in groups for the public punishment of these five men. Even though it was extremely cold, all five of them had to strip naked. The Ustaše tied their hands behind their backs and hanged them by their arms. They were hanged in this position for an hour, shivering from the cold. Their bodies turned blue. After an hour, Matković had them unbound and shot all five of them in the back of their heads. He held a speech for the prisoners, in which he threatened an even harsher punishment if such a 'crime' happened again".

== Changes in the administration in March 1943 ==
In March 1943, a division became imminent within the Ustase leadership. The direct influence over this debate was the loss of the Axis at Stalingrad. Some of the Ustase, led by Pavelić, wanted to slow down their policy of ethnic cleansing, in fear of losing to the Allies, while others, led by Dido Kvaternik, sought to boost the rate of extermination. Eugen Kvaternik was replaced by Josip Crnković. Awaiting to be relieved of his command on 19 March 1943, Matković "celebrated" off-duty with his fellows, by beating inmates roughly, wounding many and killing one. One of those who participated was Petar Brzica. Matković apparently remained in the camp. Matković was replaced with Ivica Brkljačić, a student of Catholic theology, who introduced a period with fewer reprisals against the inmates. After 16 inmates escaped in summer 1943, killing 2 guards, heavy beating and mass killings of the inmates repeated for a period of 8 days.

== Death ==
Matković was part of the Bleiburg repatriations in 1945, and was likely summarily executed by the Partisans in the Celje area of Slovenia.

== See also ==
- Independent State of Croatia
