= Gradina Donja =

Gradina Donja Градина Доња
- Village
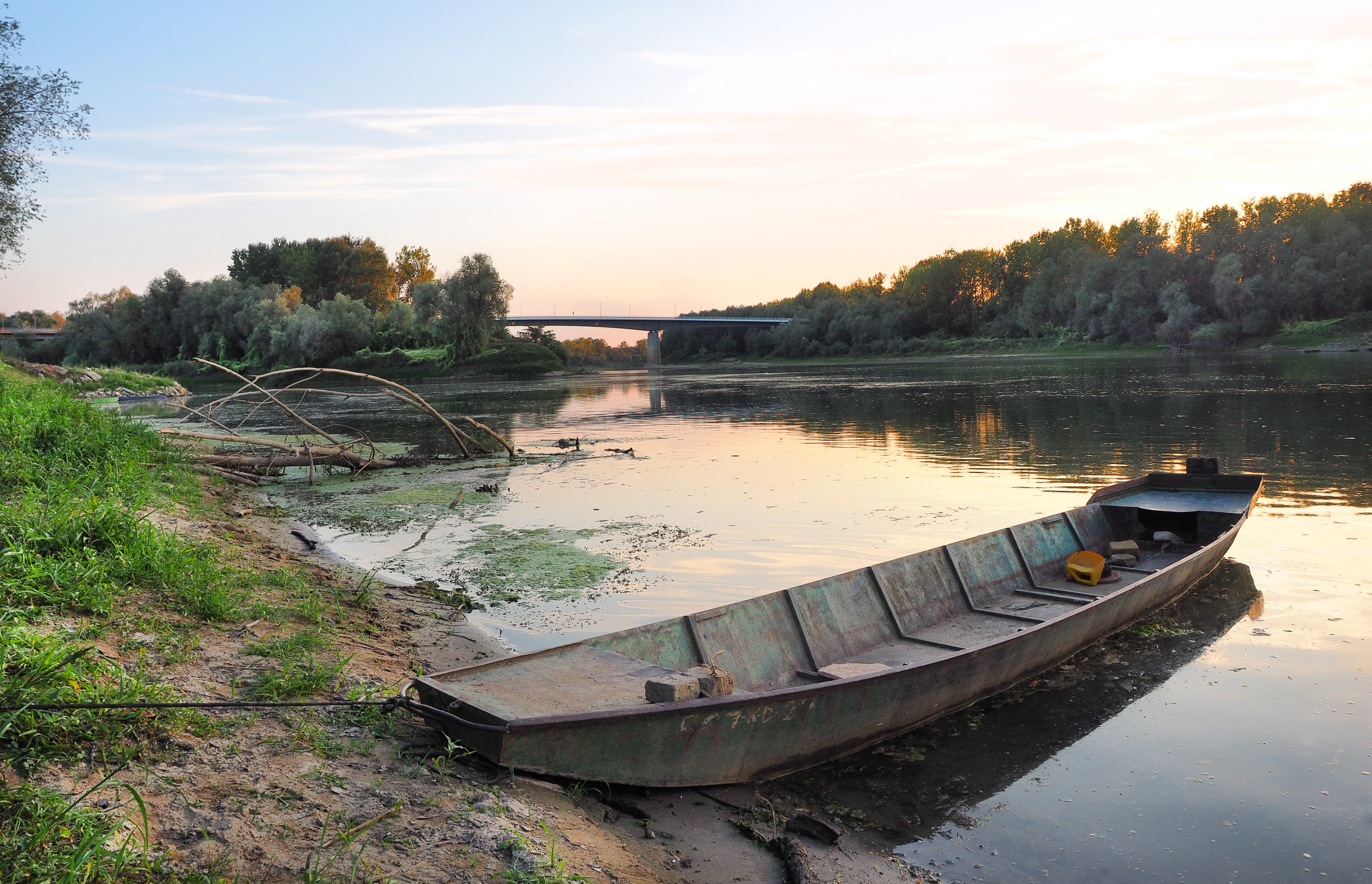
- Boat on the mouth of river Una to river Sava, Donja Gradina, Republika Srpska

- Location within Bosnia and Herzegovina
- Coordinates: 45°16′N 16°55′E
- Country: Bosnia and Herzegovina
- Entity: Republika Srpska
- Municipality: Kozarska Dubica
- Time zone: UTC+1 (CET)
  - Summer (DST): UTC+2 (CEST)

Gradina Donja (Serbian Cyrillic: Градина Доња) is a village in the municipality of Kozarska Dubica, Republika Srpska, Bosnia and Herzegovina.

== See also ==
- Donja Gradina Memorial Site - Information Portal to European on MemorialMuseums
