= Jasenovac concentration camp =

Concentration camp run by the Ustaše in occupied Yugoslavia during World War II

- Concentration and extermination camp
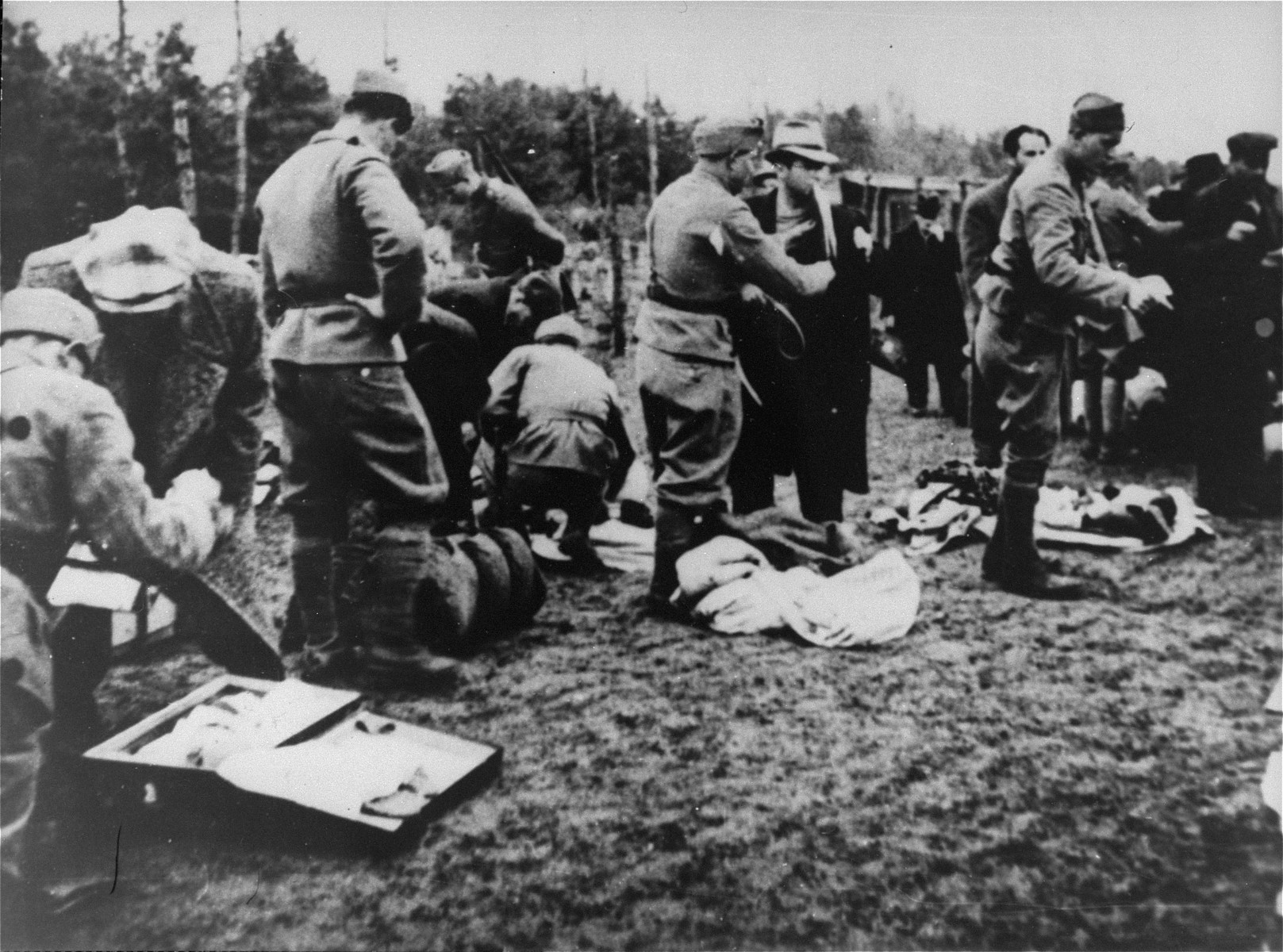
- Arriving prisoners being robbed by Ustaše guards

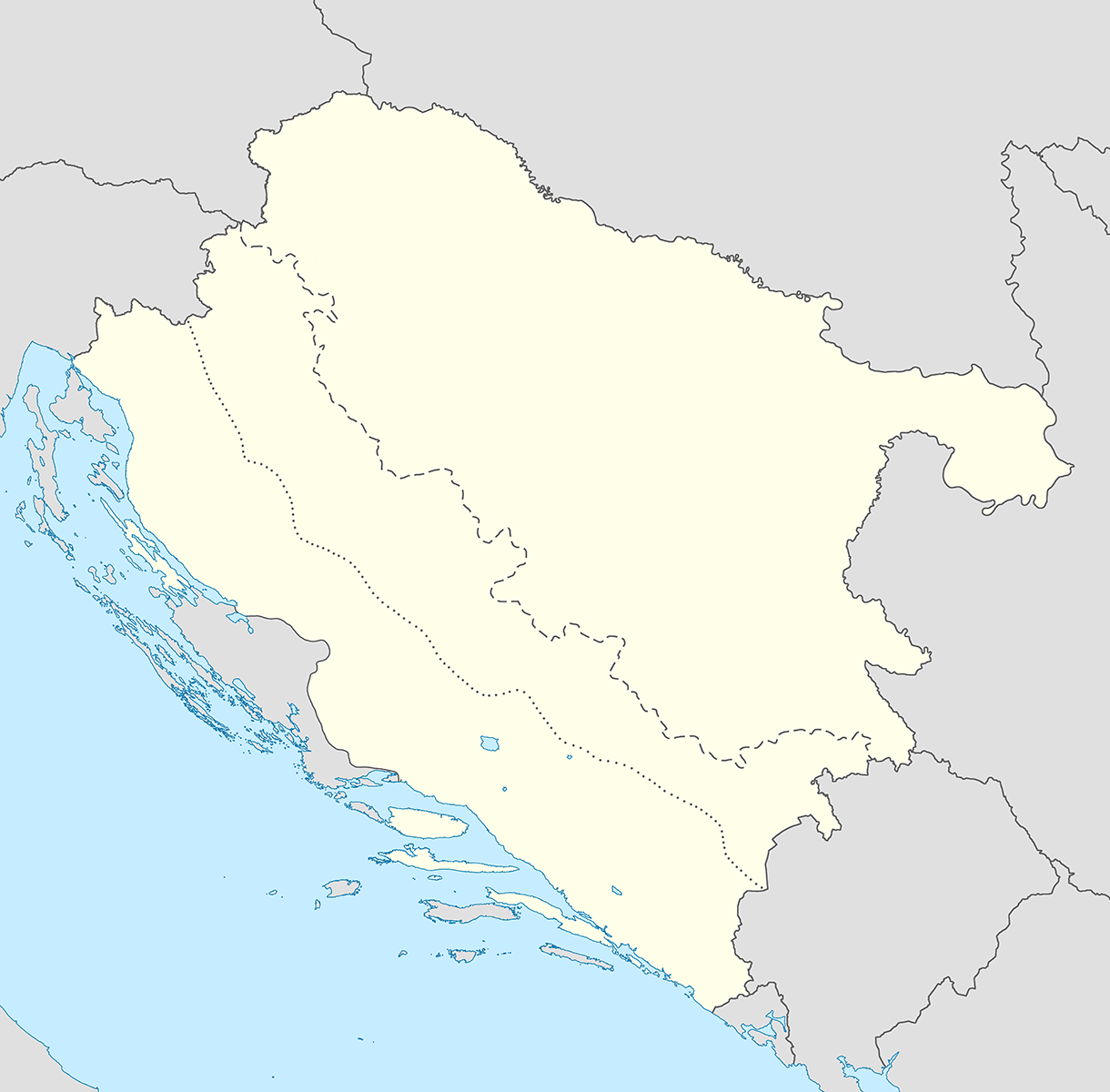
- Location within NDH
- Interactive map of Jasenovac concentration camp
- Coordinates: 45°16′38″N 16°55′20″E
- Other names: Logor Jasenovac / Логор Јасеновац, pronounced [lôːgor jasěnoʋat͡s]
- Known for: Mass murder of Serbs, Romani people, Jews, and political opponents in the Independent State of Croatia
- Location: Jasenovac, Independent State of Croatia
- Operated by: Ustaše Supervisory Service (UNS)
- First built: August 1941
- Operational: 21 August 1941 – 22 April 1945
- Inmates: Mainly Serbs, Roma, and Jews; also Croat and Bosnian Muslim political dissidents
- Killed: 83,000–100,000 consisting of: Serbs 45,000–52,000; Roma 15,000–27,000; Jews 12,000–20,000; Croats and Bosnian Muslims 5,000–12,000
- Liberated by: Yugoslav Partisans
- Notable inmates: List of prisoners of Jasenovac
- Website: jusp-jasenovac.hr

Jasenovac (pronounced [jasěnovats]) was a concentration and extermination camp established in the village of the same name by the authorities of the Independent State of Croatia (NDH) in occupied Yugoslavia during World War II. The concentration camp, one of the ten largest in Europe, was established and operated by the governing Ustaše regime, Europe's only Nazi collaborationist regime that operated its own extermination camps, for Serbs, Romani, Jews, and political dissidents. It quickly grew into the third largest concentration camp in Europe.

The camp was established in August 1941, in marshland at the confluence of the Sava and Una rivers near the village of Jasenovac, and was dismantled in April 1945. It was "notorious for its barbaric practices and the large number of victims". Unlike German Nazi-run camps, Jasenovac lacked the infrastructure for mass murder on an industrial scale, such as gas chambers. Instead, it "specialized in one-on-one violence of a particularly brutal kind", and prisoners were primarily murdered with the use of knives, hammers, and axes, or shot.

In Jasenovac, the majority of victims were Serbs (as part of the genocide of the Serbs); others were Romani (the Porajmos), Jews (The Holocaust), and socialists. Jasenovac was a complex of five subcamps spread over 210 km^{2} (81 sq mi) on both banks of the Sava and Una rivers. The largest camp was the "Brickworks" camp at Jasenovac, about 100 km (62 mi) southeast of Zagreb. The overall complex included the Stara Gradiška sub-camp, the killing grounds across the Sava river at Gradina Donja, five work farms, and the Uštica Roma camp.

There has been much debate and controversy regarding the number of victims killed at the Jasenovac concentration camp complex during its more than three-and-a-half years of operation. Over the last few decades, a consensus has formed in support of estimates of the Ustaše regime having murdered somewhere near 100,000 people in Jasenovac between 1941 and 1945.

== Background ==
The Independent State of Croatia (NDH) was founded on 10 April 1941, after the invasion of Yugoslavia by the Axis powers. The NDH consisted of the present-day Republic of Croatia and modern-day Bosnia and Herzegovina together with Syrmia in modern-day Serbia. It was essentially an Italo–German quasi-protectorate, as it owed its existence to the Axis powers, who maintained occupation forces within the puppet state throughout its existence. However, its day-to-day administration was composed almost exclusively of Croatians, including monks and nuns, under the leadership of the Ustaše.

Before the war, the Ustaše were an ultranationalist, fascist, racist, and terrorist organization, fighting for an independent Croatia. In 1932, Ustaše leader Ante Pavelić proclaimed: "The knife, revolver, machine gun and time bomb; these are the idols, these are bells that will announce the dawning and the resurrection of the independent state of Croatia". Ustaše terrorists set off bombs on international trains bound for the Kingdom of Yugoslavia, and Pavelić and other Ustaše leaders were sentenced to death in absentia by French courts, for organising the assassination of Alexander I of Yugoslavia and French Foreign Minister Louis Barthou in 1934 in Marseilles. The Ustaše were virulently anti-Serb and antisemitic. In their 17 Principles, they proclaimed that those who were not "of Croat blood" (i.e. Serbs and Jews) would not have any political role in the future Croat state. In 1936, in The Croat Question, Pavelić called Jews "the enemy of the Croat people".

=== NDH legislation ===
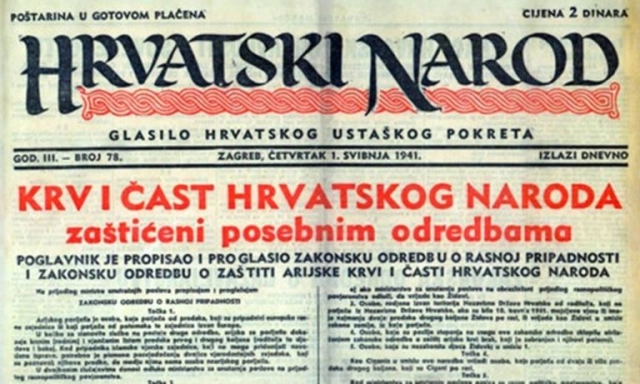
Ustaše newspaper proclaims NDH Race Laws, noting that The Leader, Ante Pavelić, signed legal provisions on racial affiliation and the protection of Aryan blood and honor of the Croatian people

Some of the first decrees issued by the leader of the NDH Ante Pavelić reflected the Ustaše adoption of the racist ideology of Nazi Germany. The regime rapidly issued a decree restricting the activities of Jews and seizing their property. These laws were followed by a decree for "the Protection of the Nation and the State" of 17 April 1941, which mandated the death penalty for the offence of high treason if a person did or had done "harm to the honor and vital interests of the Croatian nation or endangered the existence of the Independent State of Croatia". This was a retroactive law, and arrests and trials started immediately. It was soon followed by a decree prohibiting the use of the Cyrillic script, which was an integral part of the rites of the Serbian Orthodox Church.

On April 30, 1941, the Ustaše proclaimed the main race laws, patterned after Nazi race laws – the "Legal Decree on Racial Origins", the "Legal Decree on the Protection of Aryan Blood and the Honor of the Croatian People", and the "Legal Provision on Citizenship". These decrees defined who was a Jew, and took away the citizenship rights of all non-Aryans, i.e. Jews and Roma. By the end of April 1941, months before the Nazis implemented similar measures in Germany, the Ustaše required all Jews to wear insignia, typically a yellow Star of David. The Ustaše declared the "Legal Provision on the Nationalization of the Property of Jews and Jewish Companies", on 10 October 1941, and with it they confiscated all Jewish property.

The Ustaše enacted many other decrees against Jews, Roma and Serbs, which became the basis for Ustaše policies of genocide against Jews and Roma, while against Serbs – as proclaimed by an Ustaše leader, Mile Budak – the policy was to kill a third, expel a third, and forcefully convert to Catholicism a third, which many historians also describe as genocide. The decrees were enforced not only through the regular court system, but also through new special courts and mobile courts-martial with extended jurisdiction. Almost immediately the first concentration camps were set up, and in July 1941 the Ustaše government began clearing ground for what would become the Jasenovac concentration camp.

=== Start of mass terror ===
Actions against Jews began immediately after the Independent State of Croatia was founded. On 10–11 April 1941, Ustaše arrested a group of prominent Zagreb Jews and held them for ransom. On 13 April the same was done in Osijek, where Ustaše and Volksdeutscher mobs also destroyed the synagogue and Jewish graveyard. This process was repeated multiple times in 1941 with groups of Jews. Simultaneously, the Ustaše initiated extensive antisemitic propaganda, with Ustaše papers writing that Croatians must "be more alert than any other ethnic group to protect their racial purity, ... We need to keep our blood clean of the Jews". They also wrote that Jews are synonymous with "treachery, cheating, greed, immorality and foreigness", and therefore "wide swaths of the Croatian people always despised the Jews and felt towards them natural revulsion".

The first mass killing of Serbs was carried out on April 30, when the Ustaše rounded up and killed 196 Serbs at Gudovac. Many other mass killings soon followed. Here is how the Croatian Catholic Bishop of Mostar, Alojzije Mišić, described the mass killings of Serbs just in one small area of Herzegovina, just during the first 6 months of the war:

People were captured like beasts. Slaughtered, killed, thrown live into the abyss. Women, mothers with children, young women, girls and boys were thrown into pits. The vice-mayor of Mostar, Mr. Baljić, a Mohammedan, publicly states, although as an official he should be silent and not talk, that in Ljubinje alone 700 schismatics [i.e. Serb Orthodox Christians] were thrown into one pit. Six full train carriages of women, mothers and girls, children under age 10, were taken from Mostar and Čapljina to the Šurmanci station, where they were unloaded and taken into the hills, with live mothers and their children tossed down the cliffs. Everyone was tossed and killed. In the Klepci parish, from the surrounding villages, 3,700 schismatics were killed. Poor souls, they were calm. I will not enumerate further. I would go too far. In the city of Mostar, hundreds were tied up, taken outside the city and killed like animals.

==== First concentration camps ====
On April 15, only 5 days after the creation of the NDH, the Ustaše established the first concentration camp, Danica, at Koprivnica. In May 1941, they rounded up 165 Jewish youth in Zagreb, members of the Jewish sports club Makabi, and sent them to Danica (all but 3 were later killed by the Ustaše). The Croatian historian, Zdravko Dizdar, estimates that some 5,600 inmates passed through the Danica camp, mostly Serbs but also Jews and Croat Communists. Of the 3,358 Danica inmates Dizdar was able to trace by name, he found that 2,862, i.e. 85%, were later killed by the Ustaše at the Jadovno and Jasenovac concentration camps, the vast majority Serbs, but also hundreds of Jews and some Croats.

In June 1941, the Ustaše established a new system of concentration camps, stretching from Gospič to the Velebit mountains, to the island of Pag. Ustaše sources state that they sent 28,700 people to these camps in the summer of 1941. Of these, Ustaše records show only 4,000 returned, after the Ustaše were forced by the Italians to shut down the camps and withdraw from the area, because of the strong resistance their mass killings had sparked. Thus the likely death toll for these camps is around 24,000, although some sources put it as high as 40,000. After residents reported the contamination of drinking water due to large numbers of corpses rotting across Velebit, the Italians sent medical officers to investigate. They found multiple death pits and mass graves, in which they estimated some 12,000 victims were killed. At Slana Concentration Camp on the island of Pag they dug up one mass grave, with nearly 800 corpses, of whom half were women and children, the youngest being 5 months old.

The majority of these victims were Serbs, but among them were also 2,000–3,000 Jews. Thus the Ustaše initiated the mass killing of Jews at approximately the same time as Nazi Einsatzgruppen in Eastern Europe, and months before the Nazis started the mass killings of German Jews.

=== The influence of Nazi Germany ===
On 10 April 1941, the Independent State of Croatia was established, supported by Nazi Germany and fascist Italy, and it adopted similar racial and political doctrines. Jasenovac contributed to the Nazi "final solution" to the "Jewish problem", the killing of Roma people and the elimination of political opponents, but its most significant purpose for the Ustaše was as a means to achieve the destruction of Serbs inside the Independent State of Croatia (NDH).

Jasenovac was located in the German occupation zone of the Independent State of Croatia. The Nazis encouraged Ustaše anti-Jewish and anti-Roma actions and showed support for the intended extermination of the Serb people. Soon, the Nazis began to make clear their genocidal goals, as in the speech Hitler gave to Slavko Kvaternik at a meeting on 21 July 1941:

The Jews are the bane of mankind. If the Jews will be allowed to do as they will, like they are permitted in their Soviet heaven, then they will fulfill their most insane plans. And thus Russia became the center to the world's illness ... if for any reason, one nation would endure the existence of a single Jewish family, that family would eventually become the center of a new plot. If there are no more Jews in Europe, nothing will hold the unification of the European nations ... this sort of people cannot be integrated in the social order or into an organized nation. They are parasites on the body of a healthy society, that live off of expulsion of decent people. One cannot expect them to fit into a state that requires order and discipline. There is only one thing to be done with them: To exterminate them. The state holds this right since, while precious men die on the battlefront, it would be nothing less than criminal to spare these bastards. They must be expelled, or – if they pose no threat to the public – to be imprisoned inside concentration camps and never be released.

At the Wannsee Conference, Germany offered the Croatian government transportation of its Jews southward, but questioned the importance of the offer as "the enactment of the final solution of the Jewish question is not crucial, since the key aspects of this problem were already solved by radical actions these governments took."

In addition to specifying the means of extermination, the Nazis often arranged the imprisonment or transfer of inmates to Jasenovac. Kasche's emissary, Major Knehe, visited the camp on 6 February 1942. Kasche thereafter reported to his superiors:

Capitan Luburic, the commander-in-action of the camp, explained the construction plans of the camp. It turns out that he made these plans while in exile. These plans he modified after visiting concentration-camps installments in Germany.

Kasche wrote the following:

The Poglavnik asks General Bader to realize that the Jasenovac camp cannot receive the refugees from Kozara. I agreed since the camp is also required to solve the problem in deporting the Jews to the east. Minister Turina can deport the Jews to Jasenovac.

Stara-Gradiška was the primary site from which Jews were transported to Auschwitz, but Kashe's letter refers specifically to the subcamp Ciglana in this regard. In all documentation, the term "Jasenovac" relates to either the complex at large or, when referring to a specific camp, to camp nr. III, which was the main camp since November 1941. The extermination of Serbs at Jasenovac was precipitated by General Paul Bader, who ordered that refugees be taken to Jasenovac. Although Jasenovac was expanded, officials were told that "Jasenovac concentration and labor camp cannot hold an infinite number of prisoners". Soon thereafter, German suspicions were renewed that the Ustaše were more concerned with the extermination of Serbs than Jews, and that Italian and Catholic pressure was dissuading the Ustaše from killing Jews.

The Nazis revisited the possibility of transporting Jews to Auschwitz, not only because extermination was easier there, but also because the profits produced from the victims could be kept in German hands, rather than being left for the Croats or Italians. Instead Jasenovac remained a place where Jews who could not be deported would be interned and killed: In this way, while Jews were deported from Tenje, two deportations were also made to Jasenovac.

It is also illustrated by the report sent by Hans Helm to Adolf Eichmann, in which it is stated that the Jews will first be collected in Stara-Gradiška, and that "Jews would be employed in 'forced labor' in Ustaše camps", mentioning only Jasenovac and Stara Gradiška, "will not be deported". The Nazis found interest in the Jews that remained inside the camp, even in June 1944, after the visit of a Red Cross delegation. Kasche wrote: "Schmidllin showed a special interest in the Jews. ... Luburic told me that Schmidllin told him that the Jews must be treated in the finest manner, and that they must survive, no matter what happens. ... Luburic suspected Schmidllin is an English agent and therefore prevented all contact between him and the Jews".

Hans Helm was in charge of deporting Jews to concentration camps. He was tried in Belgrade in December 1946, along with other SS and Gestapo officials, and was sentenced to death by hanging, along with August Meyszner, Wilhelm Fuchs, Josef Hahn, Ludwig Teichmann, Josef Eckert, Ernst Weimann, Richard Kaserer and Friedrich Polte.

== Creation and operation ==
Location of main camp Ciglana and additional camps.

Plan of Jasenovac main camp

Jadovno concentration camp was the first camp used for extermination by the Ustaše. Jadovno was operational from May 1941 but was closed in August of the same year, coinciding with the formation of the camp at Jasenovac in the same month. The Jasenovac complex was built between August 1941 and February 1942. The first two camps, Krapje and Bročice, were closed in November 1941.

Three newer camps continued to function until the end of the war:

- Ciglana (Jasenovac III)
- Kožara (Jasenovac IV)
- Stara Gradiška (Jasenovac V)

=== Camp Command ===
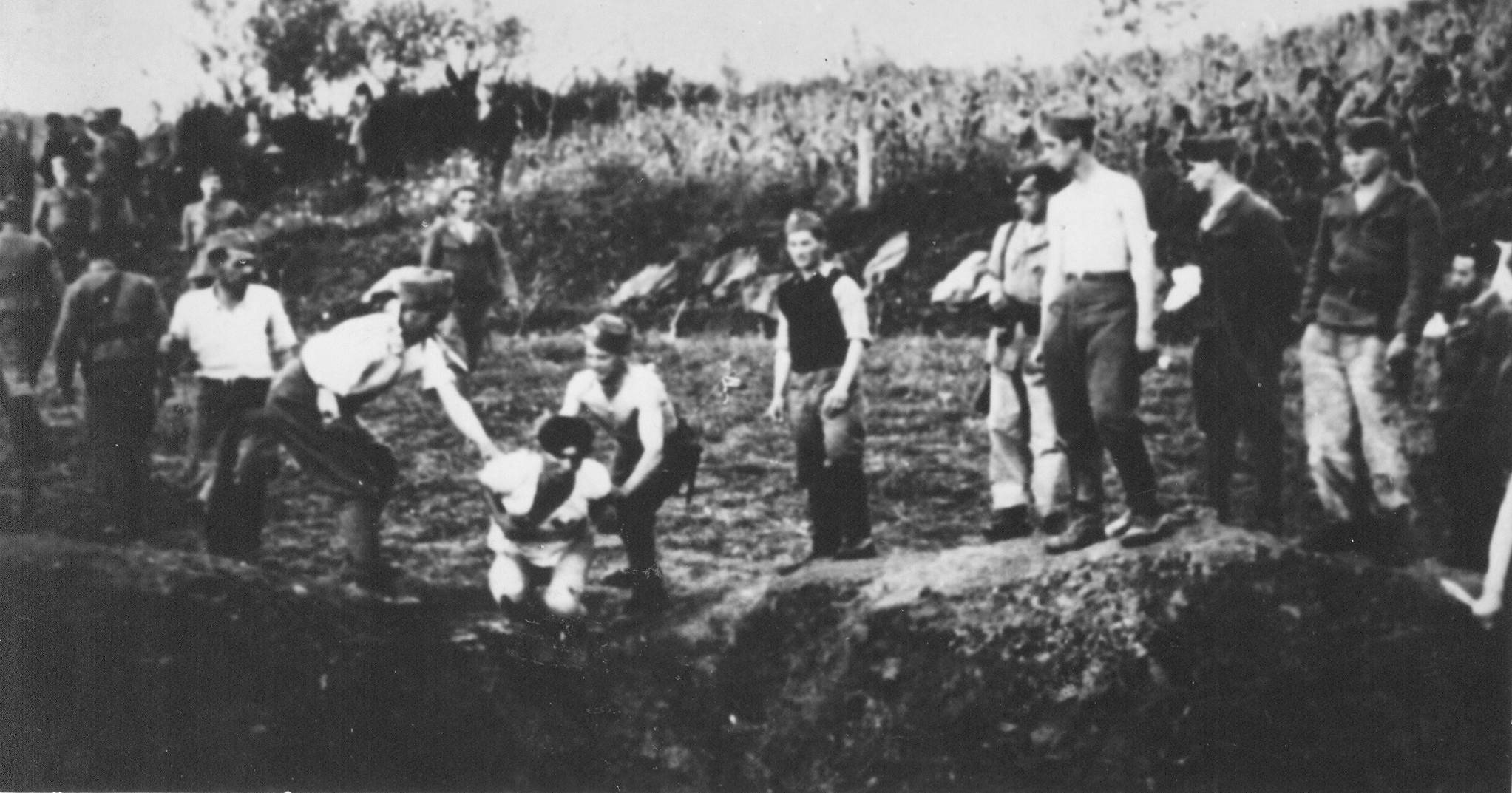
Ustaše militia executing people over a mass grave near Jasenovac concentration camp

At the top of the Jasenovac command chain was the Ustaše leader, Ante Pavelić, who signed the Nazi-style Race Laws, and led the Ustaše genocides against Jews, Serbs and Roma. Jasenovac inmate, Ante Ciliga, wrote that "Jasenovac was the original 'Balkan' creation of Ante Pavelić. Hitler's camps were only…the starting point". Pavelić entrusted the organization of mass killing in the camps to the Ustaše Surveillance Service (UNS), placing at its head his close associate, Dido Kvaternik. Giuseppe Masucci, secretary to the Vatican's representative in the NDH, considered Kvaternik the worst of Ustaše, noting he told him Croatian Jews committed "300,000 abortions, rapes and deflorations of young girls." As the Ustaše terror against Serbs and others, of which Jasenovac was the apogee, ignited wider Partisan resistance, the Germans in October 1942 pressured Pavelić to remove and exile Dido Kvaternik. Kvaternik later blamed Pavelić for Ustaše crimes, claiming he merely executed Pavelić's orders.

The camp was constructed, managed and supervised by Department III of the "Ustaše Supervisory Service" (Ustaška nadzorna služba, UNS), a special police force of the NDH. Among the main Jasenovac commanders were the following:

- Vjekoslav "Maks" Luburić. Upon returning from exile, Luburić in May–July 1941 commanded multiple massacres of hundreds of Serb civilians in Lika, thus igniting the Serb uprising. Promoted to Head of Bureau III of the Ustaše Surveillance Service, which oversaw all NDH concentration camps, he travelled to Germany in September 1941 to study SS concentration camps, using these as a model for Jasenovac. A German memorandum described Luburić as "a neurotic, pathological personality". Following the Kozara offensive in which Luburić's troops slaughtered hundreds of Serb civilians and the Ustaše imprisoned tens-of-thousands in Jasenovac, he "adopted" 450 displaced Serb boys, dressed them in black Ustaše uniforms, dubbing them his "little janissaries" (according to the Ottoman system, in which boys taken from Christian families in the Balkans were inducted into the Ottoman military). Luburić's experiment failed to turn the boys into Ustaše, most died in Jasenovac of malnutrition and diseases.
- Ljubo Miloš was appointed commander of Jasenovac in October 1941. Croatian politician Vladko Maček, imprisoned by the Ustaše in Jasenovac, later wrote that he asked Miloš if he "feared God's punishment" for the atrocities he committed in Jasenovac. Miloš replied, "I know I will burn in hell for what I have done. But I will burn for Croatia." Many Jasenovac inmates testified to Miloš's crimes, including pretending to be a doctor, then cutting inmates open with a knife, from throat to stomach. After leading Jasenovac guards in the slaughter and pillaging of nearby Serb villages, Miloš was tried and jailed at German insistence, but soon released on Luburić's intervention.
- Miroslav Filipović. Luburić brought Filipović to Jasenovac, after the Germans jailed Filipović for participating as an Ustaše chaplain in the mass slaughter of up to 2,300 Serb civilians near Banja Luka in February 1942, including killing an entire class of school children, which Filipović personally instigated by slitting the throat of a schoolgirl. He rose to commander of Jasenovac-III in May 1942, and in October of Stara Gradiška. Having been a Franciscan, the inmates called him "Brother Satan", and testified that he personally killed numerous prisoners, including children. While Ljubo Miloš blamed Filipović for ordering mass killings, Filipović in turn blamed Luburić, who he said instructed him "that Serbs must be ruthlessly exterminated", portraying himself as merely an obedient Ustaše follower.

Other individuals managing the camp at different times included Ivica Matković, Ante Vrban, and Dinko Šakić. The camp administration also used Ustaše battalions, police units, Domobrani units, auxiliary units made up of Bosnian Muslims, as well as Germans and Hungarians. The Ustaše interned, tortured and executed men, women and children in Jasenovac. The largest number of victims were Serbs, but victims also included Jews, Roma (or "gypsies"), as well as some dissident Croats and Bosnian Muslims (i.e. Partisans or their sympathizers, all categorized by the Ustaše as "Communists").

Upon arrival at the camp, the prisoners were marked with colors, similar to the use of Nazi concentration camp badges: blue for Serbs, and red for communists (non-Serbian resistance members), while Roma had no marks. This practice was later abandoned. Most victims were killed at execution sites near the camp: Granik, Gradina, and other places. Those kept alive were mostly skilled at needed professions and trades (doctors, pharmacists, electricians, shoemakers, goldsmiths, and so on), and were employed in services and workshops at Jasenovac.

=== Inmate population ===
Serbs constituted the majority of inmates in Jasenovac. Serbs were generally brought to Jasenovac concentration camp after refusing to convert to Catholicism. In many municipalities around the NDH, warning posters declared that any Serb who did not convert to Catholicism would be deported to a concentration camp. The Ustaše regime's policy of mass killings of Serbs constituted genocide.

The Jasenovac Memorial Area list of victims is more than 56% Serbs, 45,923 out of 80,914. In some cases, inmates were immediately killed upon acknowledging Serbian ethnicity, and most considered it to be the sole reason for their imprisonment. The Serbs were predominantly brought from the Kozara region, where the Ustaše captured areas that were held by Partisan guerrillas. Although the Germans were not directly present in Jasenovac concentration camp, they participated in the internment of peoples after the "cleansing actions" from the Partisan war-affected areas, especially during the Kozara offensive, in addition they were also taking inmates to forced labor in Germany and other camps in the occupied Europe. These were brought to the camp without sentence, almost destined for immediate execution, accelerated via the use of machine-guns.

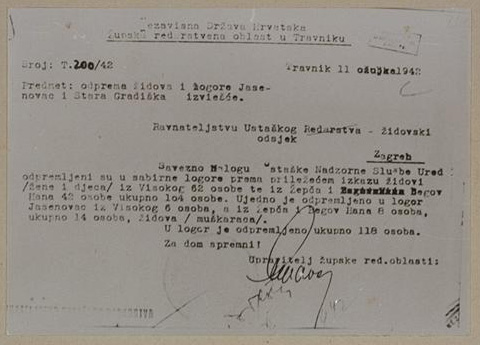
A report on the deportation of Travnik area Jews to Jasenovac and Stara Gradiška camps, March 1942

Jews, the primary target of Nazi genocide, were the second-largest category of victims of Jasenovac. The number of Jewish casualties is uncertain, but estimates range from about 8,000 to around 25,000, almost two thirds of the Croatian Jewish population of 37,000.

Most of the executions of Jews at Jasenovac occurred prior to August 1942. Thereafter, the NDH deported them to Auschwitz. In general, Jews were initially sent to Jasenovac from all parts of Croatia after being gathered in Zagreb, and from Bosnia and Herzegovina after being gathered in Sarajevo. Some, however, were transported directly to Jasenovac from other cities and smaller towns. Roma in Jasenovac consisted of both Roma and Sinti, who were captured in various areas in Bosnia, especially in the Kozara region. They were brought to Jasenovac and taken to area III-C, where nutrition, hydration, shelter and sanitary conditions were all below the rest of the camp's own abysmally low standards. The figures of murdered Roma are estimated between 20,000 and 50,000.

Anti-fascists consisted of various sorts of political and ideological opponents or antagonists of the Ustaše regime. In general, their treatment was similar to other inmates, although known communists were executed right away, and convicted Ustaše or law-enforcement officials, or others close to the Ustaše in opinion, such as Croatian peasants, were held on beneficial terms and granted amnesty after serving a duration of time. The leader of the banned Croatian Peasant Party, Vladko Maček was held in Jasenovac from October 1941 to March 1942, after which he was kept under strict house arrest. Unique among the fascist states during World War II, Jasenovac contained a camp specifically for children in Sisak. Around 20,000 Serb, Jewish and Roma children perished at Jasenovac.

==== Women and children ====
Of the 83,145 named victims listed in the Jasenovac Memorial Site, more than half are women (23,474) and children (20,101) below the age of 14. Most were held at Stara Gradiška camp of the Jasenovac complex, specifically designed for women and children, as well as associated camps in Jablanac and Mlaka, while children were also held in other Ustaše concentration camps for children at Sisak and Jastrebarsko. Many of the children in the camps were among the tens-of-thousands of Serb civilians captured during the German-Ustaše Kozara offensive, after which many of their parents sent to forced labor in Germany, while the children were separated from the parents and placed in Ustaše concentration camps. In addition nearly all the Roma women and children in the NDH were exterminated at Jasenovac, as well as thousands of Jewish women and children, among the up to two-thirds of all Croatian Holocaust victims killed at Jasenovac. The terrible conditions the children were held in were described by one of the female inmates Giordana Friedländer:

When I entered the room I had something to see. One child was lying with his head in feces, the other children in urine were lying on top of each other. I approached one of the girls with the intention of lifting her out of the pool of dirt, and she looked at me as if smiling. She was already dead. One 10-year-old boy, completely naked, was standing by the wall because he could not sit down. Out of him hung his gut covered in flies.

Later the commandant of the camp, Ante Vrban, ordered the room sealed and with a mask on his face inserted zyklon gas into the room, killing the remaining children. At his trial the commandant of Ante Vrban, admitted to these killings.

=== Living conditions ===
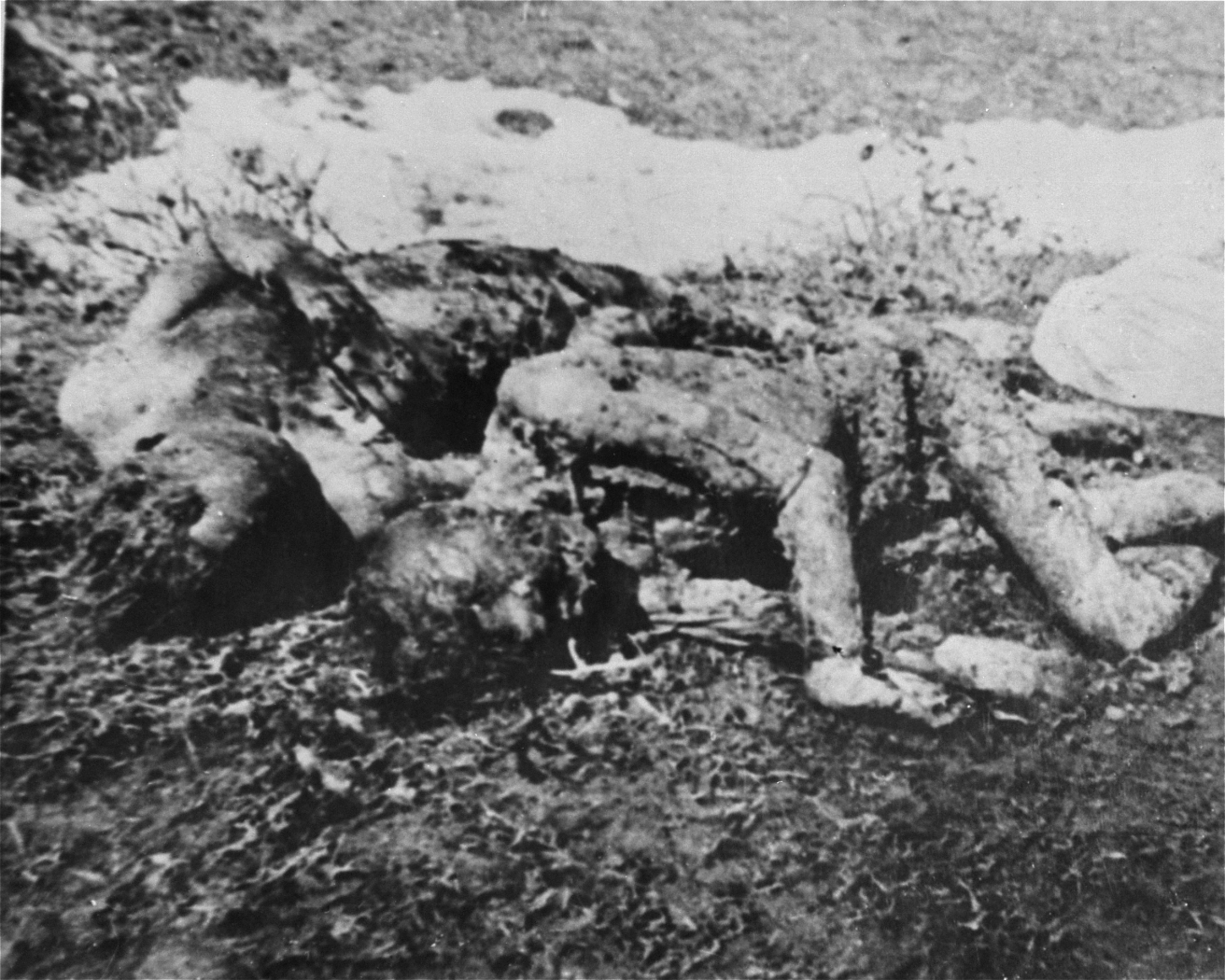
The bodies of prisoners executed by the Ustaše in Jasenovac

The living conditions in the camp evidenced the severity typical of Nazi death camps: a meager diet, deplorable accommodation, and the cruel treatment by the Ustaše guards. As in many camps, conditions would be improved temporarily during visits by delegations – such as the press delegation that visited in February 1942 and a Red Cross delegation in June 1944 – and reverted after the delegation left.

- Systematic starvation: Again, typical of death camps, the diet of inmates at Jasenovac was insufficient to sustain life: In camp Bročice, inmates were given a "soup" made of hot water with starch for breakfast, and beans for lunch and dinner (served at 6:00, 12:00 and 21:00). The food in Camp No. III was initially better, consisting of potatoes instead of beans; however, in January the diet was changed to a single daily serving of thin "turnip soup," often hot water with two or three cabbage leaves thrown into the pot. By the end of the year, the diet changed again, to 3 daily portions of thin gruel made of water and starch. To still their terrible hunger, "people ate grass and leaves, but these were very difficult to digest". As a special treat prisoners ate a dead dog, and there were "cases of scatophagia – inmates removing undigested beans and the like from the feces in the Ustasha latrine". People began to die of starvation already in October 1941.
- Water: Jasenovac was even more severe than most death camps in one respect: a general lack of potable water. Prisoners were forced to drink water from the Sava river.
- Accommodation: In the first camps, Bročice and Krapje, inmates slept in standard concentration-camp barracks, with three tiers of bunks. In the winter, these "barracks" freely admitted rain and snow through their roofs and gaps in their walls. Prisoners would have to wade through ankle deep water inside the cabin. Inmates who died were often left inside the "barracks" for several days before they were removed. In Camp No. III, which housed some 3,000 people, inmates initially slept in the attics of the workshops, in an open depot designated as a railway "tunnel", or simply in the open. A short time later, eight barracks were erected. Inmates slept in six of these barracks, while the other two were used as a "clinic" and a "hospital", where ill inmates were sent to die or be executed.
- Forced labor: As in all concentration camps, Jasenovac inmates were forced daily to perform some 11 hours of hard labor, under the eye of their Ustaše captors, who would execute any inmate for the most trivial reasons. The labor section was overseen by Ustaša's Dominik "Hinko" Piccili (or Pičili) and Tihomir Kordić. Piccili (or Pičili) would personally lash inmates to force them to work harder.

He divided the "Jasenovac labor force" into 16 groups, including groups of construction, brickworks, metal-works, agriculture, etc. The inmates would perish from the hard work. Work in the brickworks was hard. Blacksmith work was also done, as the inmates forged knives and other weapons for the Ustaše. Dike construction work was the most feared.

- Sanitation: Inside the camp, squalor and lack of sanitation reigned: clutter, blood, vomit and decomposing bodies filled the barracks, which were also full of pests and of the foul stench of the often overflowing latrine bucket. Due to exposure to the elements, inmates suffered from impaired health leading to epidemics of typhus, typhoid, malaria, pleuritis, influenza, dysentery and diphtheria. During pauses in labor (05:00–06:00; 12:00–13:00, 17:00–20:00) inmates had to relieve themselves at open latrines, which consisted of big pits dug in open fields, covered in planks. Inmates would tend to fall inside, and often died. The Ustaše encouraged this by either having internees separate the planks, or by physically drowning inmates inside. The pit would overflow during floods and rains, and was also deliberately drained into the lake, from which inmate drinking water was taken. The inmate's rags and blankets were too thin to prevent exposure to frost, as was the shelter of the barracks. Clothes and blankets were rarely and poorly cleansed, as inmates were only allowed to wash them briefly in the lake's waters once a month save during winter time, when the lake froze. Then, a sanitation device was erected in a warehouse, where clothes were insufficiently boiled.
- Lack of personal possessions: Inmates were stripped of their belongings and personal attire. As inmates, only ragged prison-issue clothing was given to them. In winter, inmates were given thin "rain-coats" and they were allowed to make light sandals. Inmates were given a personal food bowl, designed to contain 0.4 liters (0.088 imp gal; 0.11 U.S. gal) of "soup" they were fed with. Inmates whose bowl was missing (e.g.: stolen by another inmate to defecate in) would receive no food. During delegation visits, inmates were given bowls twice as large with spoons. At such times, inmates were given colored tags.
- Anxiety: The fear of death, and the paradox of a situation in which the living dwell next to the dead, had great impact on the internees. Basically, an inmate's life in a concentration camp can be viewed in the optimal way when looking at it in three stages: arrival to camp, living inside it, and the release. The first stage consisted of the shock caused by the hardships in transit to camp. The Ustaše would fuel this shock by murdering a number of inmates upon arrival and by temporarily housing new-arrivals in warehouses, attics, in the train tunnel and outdoors.

After the inmates grew familiar with the life in camp, they would enter the second and most critical phase: living through the anguish of death, and the sorrow, hardships and abuse. The peril of death was most prominent in "public performances for public punishment" or selections, when inmates would be lined in groups and individuals would be randomly pointed out to receive punishment of death before the rest. The Ustaše would intensify this by prolonging the process, patrolling about and asking questions, gazing at inmates, choosing them and then refrain and point out another. As inmates, people could react to the Ustaše crimes in an active or passive manner. The activists would form resistance movements and groups, steal food, plot escapes and revolts, contacts with the outside world.

All inmates suffered psychological trauma to some extent: obsessive thoughts of food, paranoia, delusions, day-dreams, lack of self-control. Some inmates reacted with attempts at documenting the atrocities, such as survivors Ilija Ivanović, Dr Nikola Nikolić and Đuro Schwartz, all of whom tried to memorize and even write of events, dates and details. Such deeds were perilous, since writing was punishable by death and tracking dates was extremely difficult. Schwartz said that a father and his three sons were killed for writing. The witness wrote his memories on a piece of paper in tiny script and hid it in his shoe.

=== Mass murder and cruelty ===
The Croatian anti-Communist émigré, Ante Ciliga, whom the Ustaše imprisoned in Jasenovac for one year, described Jasenovac as a huge killing machine, whose main purpose, like that of Auschwitz, was "extermination", although "the primitivistic cruelties of Jasenovac distinguished this Balkan Auschwitz." Historian Raphael Israeli notes that Jaša Almuli described Jasenovac as "worse than Auschwitz", referring to the direct, hands-on methods of killing carried out by Ustaša camp authorities.

In the late summer of 1942, tens of thousands of ethnic Serb villagers were deported to Jasenovac from the Kozara region in Bosnia, where NDH forces were fighting the Partisans. Most of the men were murdered in Jasenovac, and the women were sent to forced labor camps in Germany. Children were either murdered or dispersed to Catholic orphanages. According to survivors' testimonies, at the special camp designed for children, Catholic nuns murdered children under their watch with a motion similar to swinging a baseball bat: a child gripped by the legs would be swung so forcefully that the head's impact against the wall was fatal. These claims could not be verified or certified.

On the night of 29 August 1942, prison guards made bets among themselves as to who could slaughter the largest number of inmates. One of the guards, Petar Brzica, boasted that he had cut the throats of about 1,360 new arrivals.

Other participants who confessed to participating in the bet included Ante Zrinušić-Sipka, who killed some 600 inmates, and Mile Friganović, who gave a detailed and consistent report of the incident. Friganović admitted to having killed some 1,100 inmates. He specifically recounted his torture of an old man named Vukasin Mandrapa; he attempted to compel the man to bless Ante Pavelić, which the old man refused to do, even after Friganović had cut off both his ears and nose after each refusal. Ultimately, he cut out the old man's eyes, tore out his heart, and slashed his throat. This incident was witnessed by Dr Nikolić.

==== Srbosjek ====
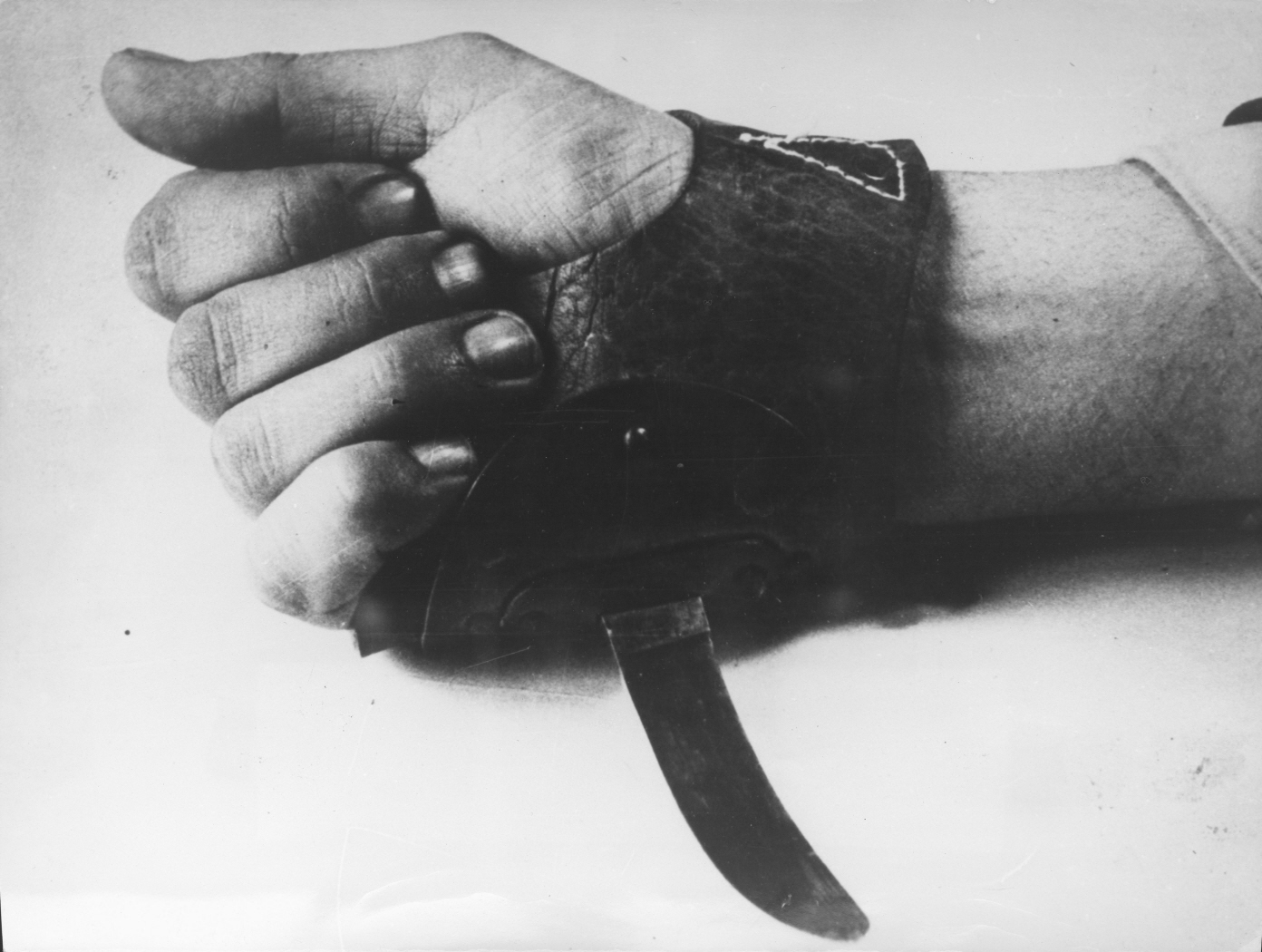
An agricultural knife nicknamed "Srbosjek" or "Serbcutter", strapped to the hand. It was used by the Ustaše militia for the speedy killing of inmates at Jasenovac

The Ustaše slaughtered inmates with a knife that became known as the "Srbosjek" (Serbian Cyrillic: Србосјек, lit. 'Serb-cutter').

The construction was originally a type of wheat sheaf knife, manufactured prior to and during World War II by the German factory Gebrüder Gräfrath from Solingen-Widdert, under the trademark "Gräwiso". The upper part of the knife was made of leather, as a sort of a glove, designed to be worn with the thumb going through the hole, so that only the blade protruded from the hand. It was a curved, 12-centimetre-long (4.7 in) knife with the edge on its concave side. The knife was fastened to a bowed oval copper plate, while the plate was fastened to a thick leather bangle. Its agricultural purpose was to enable field workers to cut wheat sheaves open before threshing them. The knife was fixed on the glove plate to prevent injuries and to increase work speed.

=== Systematic extermination of prisoners ===
Besides sporadic killings and deaths due to the poor living conditions, many inmates arriving at Jasenovac were scheduled for systematic extermination. An important criterion for selection was the duration of a prisoner's anticipated detention. Strong men capable of labor and sentenced to less than three years of incarceration were allowed to live. All inmates with indeterminate sentences or sentences of three years or more were immediately scheduled for execution, regardless of their physical fitness.

Systematic extermination varied both as to place and form. Some of the executions were mechanical, following Nazi methodology, while others were manual. The mechanical means of extermination included:

- Cremation: The Ustaše cremated living inmates, who were sometimes drugged and sometimes fully awake, as well as corpses. The first cremations took place in the brick factory ovens in January 1942. Croatian engineer Dominik "Hinko" Piccili (or Pičili) perfected this method by converting seven of the kiln's furnace chambers into specialized crematories. Crematoria were also placed in Gradina, across the Sava River. According to the State Commission, however, "there is no information that it ever went into operation." Later testimony, however, say the Gradina crematory had become operational. Some bodies were buried rather than cremated, as shown by exhumation of bodies late in the war.
- Gassing and poisoning: The Ustaše tried to employ poisonous gas to kill inmates arriving in Stara Gradiška. They first tried to gas the women and children who arrived from Djakovo with gas vans that Simo Klaić called "green Thomas". The method was later replaced with stationary gas-chambers with Zyklon B and sulfur dioxide. Jasenovac concentration camp did not have gas chambers.

Manual methods were executions that took part in utilizing sharp or blunt craftsmen tools: knives, saws, hammers, et cetera. These executions took place in various locations:

- Granik: Granik was a ramp used to unload goods of Sava boats. In winter 1943–44, season agriculture laborers became unemployed, while large transports of new internees arrived and the need for liquidation, in light of the expected Axis defeat, were large. Vjekoslav "Maks" Luburić devised a plan to utilize the crane as a gallows on which slaughter would be committed, so that the bodies could be dumped into the stream of the flowing river. In the autumn, the Ustaše NCO's came in every night for some 20 days, with lists of names of people who were incarcerated in the warehouse, stripped, chained, beaten and then taken to the "Granik", where weights were tied to the wire that was bent on their arms, and their intestines and neck were slashed, and they were thrown into the river with a blow of a blunt tool in the head. The method was later enhanced, so that inmates were tied in pairs, back to back, their bellies cut before they were tossed into the river alive.
- Gradina: The Ustaše utilized empty areas in the vicinity of the villages of Donja Gradina and Uštica, where they encircled an area marked for slaughter and mass graves in wire. The Ustaše slew victims with knives or smashed their skulls with mallets. When Roma arrived in the camp, they did not undergo selection, but were rather concentrated under the open skies at a section of camp known as "III-C". From there the Roma were taken to liquidation in Gradina, working on the dike (men) or in the corn fields in Ustice (women) in between liquidations. Thus Gradina and Uštica became Roma mass grave sites. Furthermore, small groups of Roma were utilized as gravediggers that actually participated in the slaughter at Gradina. Thus the extermination at the site grew until it became the main killing-ground in Jasenovac. At Gradina, 105 mass graves, covering a total area of 10,130 m^{2} have been found. A further 22 mass graves, the extent of which has not yet been confirmed, have also been found. Separately, at Uštica, 21 mass graves with a surface area of 1218 m^{2} have been found.
- Limani Graves. Prior to early 1942, when liquidations of prisoners began at Gradina, most inmates were killed inside the Jasenovac III camp. A special detail of prisoner-gravediggers was ordered every day to bury the bodies in huge trenches dug close to the camp fence. In this area, called Limani. seven mass graves are located, with a total surface area of 1,175 m^{2}.
- Međustrugovi and Uskočke šume. These are sites of mass murders of prisoners from Stara Gradiška, mainly during 1944. In 1946, 967 victims were exhumed (311 men, 467 women and 189 children) from 4 mass graves. The remains were later interred in a common cemetery at Stara Gradiška, while identified victims were returned to where they had come from, mostly the Srijem area. About a thousand additional victims are buried in Međustrugovi Woods in one enormous mass grave.
- Krapje When Krapje (Camp I) and Brocice (Camp II) were closed in November 1941, of the 3,000 to 4,000 prisoners then in the camps, only about 1,500 were transferred to the new Camp III (Brickworks), the rest were killed. At Krapje three mass graves are found – a central mass grave, a second mass grave, in which mostly Jewish victims were buried, and a third large grave, where the executed employees of Zagreb Electrical Trams were buried.
- Mlaka and Jablanac: Two sites used as collection and labor camps for the women and children in camps III and V, but also as places where many of these women and children, as well as other groups, were executed in the countryside around these two villages. Five mass graves were identified in and around Mlaka.
- Velika Kustarica: According to the state-commission, as far as 50,000 people were killed here in the winter amid 1941 and 1942. There is evidence suggesting that killings took place there at that time and afterwards.

The Ustaše carried out extensive means of torture and methods of killing against detainees which included but not limited to: inserting hot nails under finger nails, mutilating parts of the body including plucking out eyeballs, tightening chains around ones head until the skull fractured and the eyes popped and also, placing salt in open wounds. Women faced rape, having their breasts severed from their bodies, pregnant women had their wombs cut out. Many of these mutilated and murdered bodies were disposed of into the adjacent river. The Ustaše took pride in the crimes they committed and wore necklaces of human eyes and tongues that were cut out from their Serb victims.

=== Inmate help ===
In July 1942, Diana Budisavljević, with the help of a German officer, Albert von Kotzian, obtained written permission to take the children from the Stara Gradiška concentration camp. With the help of the Ministry of Social Affairs, including Kamilo Bresler, she was able to relocate child inmates from the camp to Zagreb, and other places.

The Red Cross has been accused of insufficiently aiding the persecuted people of Nazi Europe. The local representative, Julius Schmidllin, was contacted by the Jewish community, which sought financial aid. The organisation helped to release Jews from camps, and even debated with the Croatian government in relation to visiting the Jasenovac camp. The wish was eventually granted in July 1944. The camp was prepared for the arrival of the delegation, so nothing incriminating was found. Inmate resistance groups were aided by contacts among the Ustaše. One of these groups, operating in the tannery, was assisted by an Ustaša, Dr Marin Jurčev and his wife, who were later hanged for this on orders of Dinko Šakić, as was any Ustasha found guilty of consorting or collaborating with inmates were executed.

== End of the camp ==
=== Burning of corpses ===
Just like the Nazis with their Sonderaktion 1005, toward the end of the war the Ustashe sought to destroy evidence of their crimes at Jasenovac. Among the few surviving inmates of the camp, at least four – Miroslav Trautman, Karl Weiss, Walter Grünn and Egon Berger – all testified that the Ustashe dug up and burned corpses at Jasenovac. Walter Grünn testified that: "All the oil and beams from the camp were taken to Gradina [one of the main killing fields at Jasenovac]. From these beams, roasts were erected, on which the dug-up bodies were thrown, covered with oil and then burned". The Jasenovac camp commanders, Miroslav Filipović and Ljubo Miloš both confirmed that the Ustashe gave the command to completely destroy all evidence of the mass graves at Jasenovac, while Miloš also described the process: "A strong guard was set up around the sites, and then healthy inmates were brought in from the camps, who dug up the corpses and stacked them in one particular location and burned them completely with gasoline or oil".

This mass burning of corpses was confirmed by a post-war commission, which performed selective excavations at Jasenovac, and in most places found "ashes and burnt remains of bones", although they also managed to find some intact mass graves, including one with 189 corpses, most with smashed skulls, among them 51 children below age 14.

=== Last liquidations and escape ===
As of April 7, 1945, some 3,500 inmates were left in the camp. Following the withdrawal from Sarajevo, Maks Luburić brought with him many additional captured civilians, who were immediately killed. On April 15 and 16, when Lepoglava prison was evacuated, the Ustaše sent 1,590 inmates to Jasenovac, where they were all killed. On April 19 Luburić gave the command to destroy the camp. The Ustaše first killed the remaining medical personnel and the sick, followed by many of the higher-qualified workers who until then had been spared.

With the Partisans fast approaching, on April 21, 1945, the Ustaše killed the remaining 700–900 women at Jasenovac. After that only an estimated 1,073 male prisoners remained, and on the night of April 21–22 they decided to stage an escape. On 22 April, 600 prisoners revolted; but of these only 92 managed to escape, while all the rest were killed. On the day of the revolt the Ustaše killed the 460 remaining prisoners who chose not to escape and later torched the buildings, guardhouses, torture rooms, the "Piccili Furnace", plus all the other structures in the camp. Upon entering the camp in May, the Partisans came across only ruins, soot, smoke, and the skeletal remains of hundreds of victims.

After the war, German, NDH, Slovene and Chetnik POWs were brought to the ruined camp to extract building materials, including from the two-kilometre-long (1.2 mi), four-metre-high (13 ft) brick wall that surrounded it. The authorities donated the extracted bricks and other building materials to the local populace, for rebuilding homes and settlements.

== Victim numbers ==
Most modern sources approximate the number of victims of the Jasenovac concentration camp at around 100,000. Jewish Croatian historian Ivo Goldstein notes that victim estimates are complicated by the fact that the Ustaše did their best to conceal their crimes. Many victims were taken directly to execution sites, without ever being registered at the camp. They also destroyed the registration files they had. Untold victims were tossed into the Sava river, and burned, both dead and alive, in the crematorium at the site. Evidence was further destroyed by massive excavation and burning of corpses at war's end.

The Jasenovac Memorial Area maintains a list of the names (collected until March 2013) of 83,145 Jasenovac victims, including 47,627 Serbs, 16,173 Romani, 13,116 Jews, 4,255 Croats, 1,128 Bosnian Muslims, and 266 Slovenes, among others. Of the 83,145 named victims, 20,101 are children under the age of 14, and 23,474 are women. The list is subject to update – in 2007, it had 69,842 entries. Ivo Goldstein also cites the same approximate total number by noting the victims list of 83,811 while adding that "10–20% may still be missing" with ongoing research still being conducted.

The United States Holocaust Memorial Museum estimates that the Ustaše murdered between 77,000 and 99,000 people at Jasenovac between 1941 and 1945, including "between 45,000 and 52,000 Serb residents of the so-called Independent State of Croatia, between 12,000 and 20,000 Jews, between 15,000 and 20,000 Roma (Gypsies), between 5,000 and 12,000 ethnic Croats and Muslims, who were political opponents of the regime". Its website states that "Determining the number of victims for Yugoslavia, for Croatia, and for Jasenovac is highly problematic, due to the destruction of many relevant documents, the long-term inaccessibility to independent scholars of those documents that survived, and the ideological agendas of postwar partisan scholarship and journalism". The ideological agendas led to a wide range of estimates, from gross exaggeration to complete minimization and denial of Jasenovac victims. Since World War II, scholars and Holocaust institutions have advanced diverse estimates of the number of victims killed at Jasenovac, ranging from 1.1 million to 30,000. Historian Tomislav Dulić disputed the previously often quoted 700,000 figure in Jasenovac, but stated that an estimated 100,000 victims still makes it one of the largest camps in Europe during World War II.

Most scholars have since settled on 25,000–27,000 Roma deaths, though there is still some uncertainty based on the pre-war and post-war issues in the registration of Roma people in censuses. Despite disagreements between historians on the exact victim numbers, there is no doubt that almost the entirety of the Roma community was annihilated by the Ustaše.

=== War-time sources ===
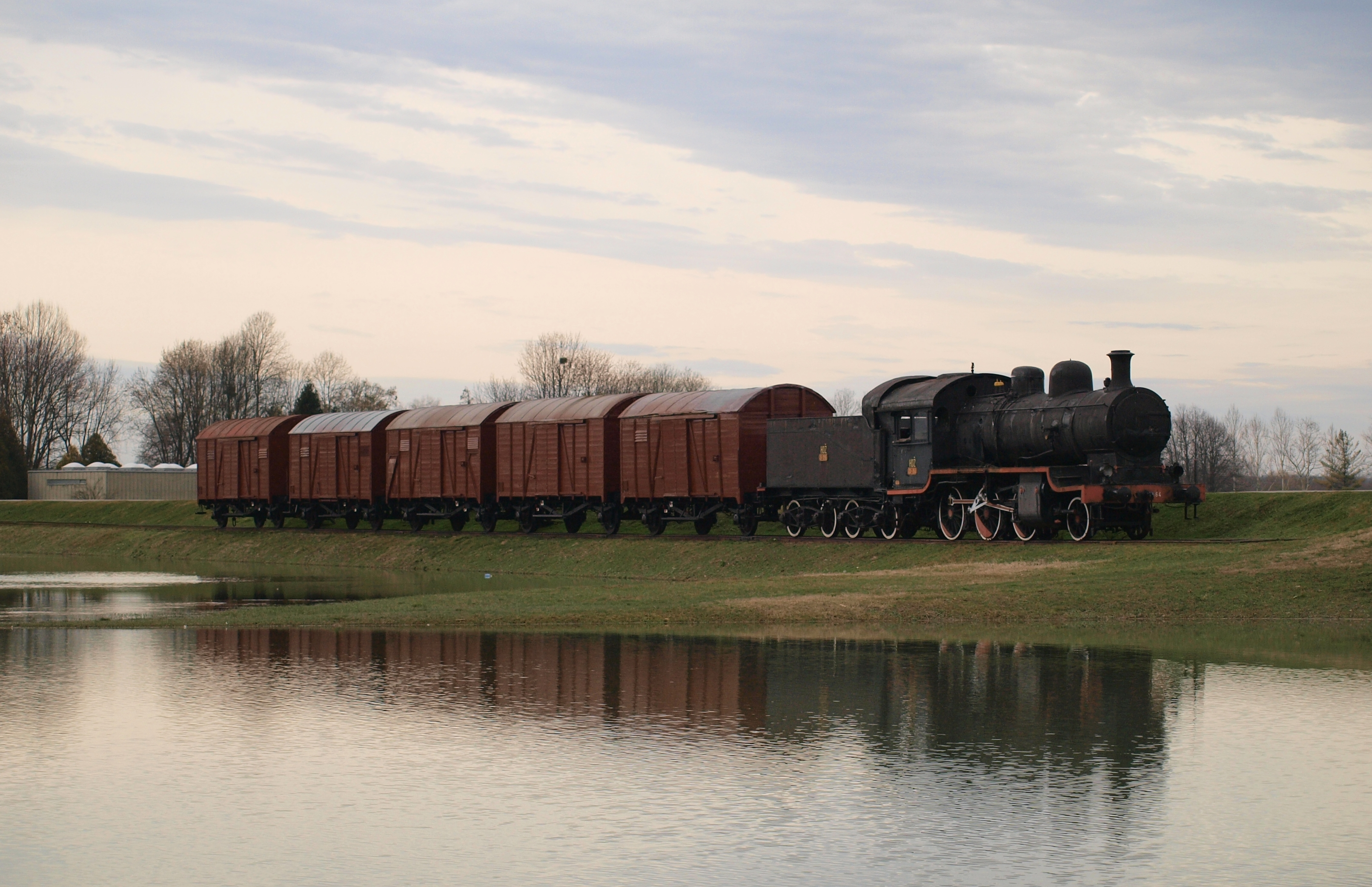
Train that carried prisoners to Jasenovac.

The documentation from the time of Jasenovac originates from the different sides in the battle for Yugoslavia: The Germans and Italians on the one hand, and the Partisans and the Allies on the other. There are also sources originating from the documentation of the Ustaše themselves and of the Vatican.

High-ranking German military officers estimated that the Ustaše killed between 250,000 (as of March 1943) and 700,000 Serbs in the entire NDH. Specifically regarding Jasenovac, the Nazi intelligence service, Sicherheitsdienst, in a report on Vjekoslav Luburić, the head of all Ustaše concentration camps, stated that the Ustaše had killed 120,000 people in Jasenovac, 80,000 in Stara Gradiška, and 20,000 in other Ustaše concentration camps. Germany's Plenipotentiary General, General von Horstenau, described his eyewitness account of children dying at the camp, the aftermath of the slaughter perpetrated by Jasenovac guards, when they herded Serb residents of nearby Crkveni Bok to the camp:

In Crkveni Bok, an unfortunate place, over which about five hundred 15- to 20-year-old thugs descended under the leadership of an Ustasha lieutenant colonel, people were killed everywhere, women were raped and then tortured to death, children were killed. I saw in the Sava River the corpse of a young woman with her eyes dug out and a stake driven into her sexual parts. This woman was at most twenty years old when she fell into the hands of these monsters. All around, pigs devoured unburied human beings. "Fortunate" residents were shipped in terrifying freight cars; many of these involuntary "travelers" cut their veins during transport to the camp [Jasenovac]"

The Ustaše themselves gave more exaggerated estimates of the number of people they killed. Vjekoslav "Maks" Luburić, the commander-in-chief of all the Croatian camps, announced the great "efficiency" of the Jasenovac camp at a ceremony on 9 October 1942. During a banquet that followed, he reported:

We have slaughtered here at Jasenovac more people than the Ottoman Empire was able to do during its occupation of Europe.

A circular from the Ustaše general headquarters reads: "the concentration and labor camp in Jasenovac can receive an unlimited number of internees." In the same spirit, Filipović-Majstorović, once captured by Yugoslav forces, admitted that during his three months of administration, 20,000 to 30,000 people died. As it became clear that his confession was an attempt to somewhat minimize the rate of crimes committed in Jasenovac, his claim to have personally killed 100 people being extremely understated, Filipović-Majstorović's figures are reevaluated so that in some sources they appear as 30,000–40,000. Filipović was Commandant of Jasenovac in Summer-early Fall of 1942, when the scholarly consensus is that the Ustaše exterminated 25,000–27,000 Roma, nearly all at Jasenovac, while the mass murder of other ethnic groups was also underway.

Jasenovac camp commanders, Miroslav Filipović and Ljubo Miloš both testified that just before the end of the war the Ustaše gave the command to completely destroy all evidence of mass graves at Jasenovac, by forcing remaining inmates to dig up and burn the corpses. This is similar to what the Nazis did, including at Sajmište concentration camp, on the territory of the Independent State of Croatia. The mass burning of corpses at Jasenovac was separately attested to by many surviving Jasenovac inmates, as well as postwar excavations which in many places found only ashes and burnt remains of bones.

Jure Paršić was appointed Catholic priest in the town of Jasenovac, by Alojzije Stepinac, in November, 1942. Although Paršić sympathized with the Ustaše cause, and arrived in Jasenovac after the great majority of the victims were killed, he still estimated that the Ustaše killed 30,000 to 40,000 people at Jasenovac. Writing in Germany in 1985, he says the whole town knew what went on in the camp, "even the children knew more than they should know." From the Ustaše guards he confessed, Paršić learned of things "far more terrible than he had supposed", adding that he doubted there were any guards who had not "bloodied their hands". But since he heard this in confession, Paršić stated he would "take this information with him to the grave".

Jure Paršić also wrote that he told Archbishop Stepinac in detail what he discovered at Jasenovac, to which he says Stepinac "shed a tear". After the Ustaše killed seven Slovenian Catholic priests in Jasenovac, Stepinac on February 24, 1943, wrote Ante Pavelić that this represented a "shameful stain and a crime that cries out for revenge, just as the whole of Jasenovac is a shameful stain on the Independent State of Croatia."

In June 1942, the well-connected Catholic theologian, Monsignor Augustin Juretić, wrote: "The concentration camp at Jasenovac is a real slaughterhouse. You have not read anywhere – not even under the GPU or Gestapo – of such horrible things as the "Ustashi" commit....the story of Jasenovac is the blackest page of the Ustashi regime, because thousands of men have been killed there."

Jasenovac inmates Milko Riffer and Egon Berger wrote of "hundreds of thousands" victims. Đorđe Miliša also published a first-hand testimony in 1945. The Roma were all hauled in at the same time, kept in an open, barbed-wired area where other inmates could see them, and all murdered within a couple of months. The primary-source estimates of Roma victims appear to have been exaggerated – from up to 20,000 (Riffer, p. 155) to 40,000 (Miliša 1945 pp. 59–61, 139–142) to 45,000 (Berger 1966, p. 67). Riffer also mentions why other estimates were more difficult – many victims were killed before even entering the camp and thus were never registered, plus to hide their crimes, the Ustaše burned the camp records.

The anti-Communist, anti-Yugoslav political exile, and former Jasenovac inmate, Ante Ciliga described Jasenovac as a "huge machine" with the sole purpose, that "some be killed as soon as they enter – others, over time". He identified Gradina as the main killing-ground, "our Styx – whoever crossed the river and stepped onto Gradina, there was no return among the living". He also stated that the life expectancy of inmates in the Jasenovac III C sub-camp was 2 weeks, and described witnessing the mass execution of Roma who attempted to escape the sub-camp. He and other inmates noted that the occupancy of Jasenovac was kept at 3,000 to 5,000 men, and all those brought into the camp in excess of that number were continuously killed. Ciliga and others described cannibalism in the camp, i.e. inmates eating their dead comrades, due to extreme starvation.

=== Post-war victim number estimates ===
In post-war Yugoslavia and later independent Croatia and Serbia, Jasenovac victim estimates became the subject of fierce ideological battles, with initial exaggerated estimates, followed by later minimizations of victim numbers and denial of Ustaše crimes. The extent of the crime committed in Jasenovac led to it becoming a paradigm of victimhood, both organically and through state-sponsored propaganda, which in turn caused the paradigm to have a life of its own, leading to a multitude of manipulations.

A 15 November 1945 report of the National Committee of Croatia for the investigation of the crimes of the occupation forces and their collaborators, which was commissioned by the new government of Yugoslavia under Josip Broz Tito, indicated that between 500,000 and 600,000 people were murdered at Jasenovac. The report suffered from methodological shortcomings since it was based on the testimonies of survivors along with general approximations.

The State Commission of Croatia for the Investigation of the Crimes of the Occupation Forces and their Collaborators from 1946 concluded:

Such a manner of preconceived and inhumane torture and slaughter of a people has never been recorded in history. The Ustase criminals followed precisely the model of their German masters, most consciously executed all their orders, and did so in pursuit of a single goal: to exterminate as many of our people as possible, and to create a living space as large as possible for them. The total dependence by the Ustase on their German masters, the foundation of the camp itself, the dispatch of the "disloyal", the brutal implementation of Hitler's racist Nazi theories and the deportation to the camps and extermination of the racially and nationally "impure", the same methods of torture and atrocities with minor varieties of Ustase cruelty, the building of furnaces and incineration of victims in furnaces (the Picilli furnace) — all of the evidence points to the conclusion that both Jasenovac and the crimes committed in it were fashioned from a German recipe, owing to a German Hitlerite order as implemented by their servants, the Ustase. Subsequently, responsibility for the crimes of Jasenovac falls equally on their German masters and the Ustase executioners.

The 1945 figures were cited by researchers Israel Gutman and Menachem Shelach in the Encyclopedia of the Holocaust from 1990. Shelach wrote that some 300,000 bodies were found and exhumed. The Simon Wiesenthal Center's Museum of Tolerance website adopted the number of 600,000 at some point.

In 1964, the Yugoslav Federal Bureau of Statistics created a list of World War II victims with 597,323 names and deficiency estimated at 20–30%, giving between 750,000 and 780,000 victims. Together with the estimate of 200,000 "collaborators and quislings" killed, the total number would reach about one million. The bureau's list was declared a state secret in 1964 and published only in 1989. After the war, a figure of 700,000 reflected the "conventional wisdom".

According to the 1964 victim census, 49,874 people perished in Jasenovac, 9,587 people in Stara Gradiška and 128 persons in Gradina, in total 59,589 people. The survey results showed a far lower figure of 59,188 killed at Jasenovac, of whom 33,944 were recorded as Serbs.

In 1946, 967 victims from the Stara Gradiška sub-camp were exhumed (311 men, 467 women and 189 children) from 4 mass graves, at Uskočke šume. The remains were later interred in a common cemetery at Stara Gradiška, while identified victims were returned to where they had come from, mostly the Syrmia (Srijem/Srem) region. About a thousand additional victims are buried in Međustrugovi Woods in one enormous mass grave. These victims were thrown, naked and tangled together, into the pit. and it was impossible to exhume and identify them due to the condition and position of the bodies.

On 16 November 1961, the municipal committee of former partisans from Bosanska Dubica organized an unofficial investigation at the grounds of Donja Gradina, led by locals who were not forensic experts. This investigation uncovered three mass graves and identified 17 human skulls in one of them. In response, scientists were called in to verify the site. Dr Alojz Šercelj started preliminary drilling to identify the most likely grave locations, and then between 22 and 27 June 1964, exhumations of bodies and the use of sampling methods was conducted at Jasenovac by Vida Brodar and Anton Pogačnik from Ljubljana University and Srboljub Živanović from Novi Sad University.

Consistent with accounts by captured Ustaše and the few surviving inmates of Ustaše camps, excavations of sites in and around the former concentration camps revealed evidence of mass burning of corpses before the end of the war were conducted. In some places the scientists found only ashes and the charred remains of bones. They also uncovered a total of seven mass graves, which held a total of 284 victims' remains, including one mass grave with 197 corpses, of whom 51 were children below age 14, and 123 were women. A large number of these corpses, especially the children, showed evidence of blunt force trauma, as their skulls were cracked, fractured and broken in numerous places. The scientists concluded that the entire Jasenovac complex could have around 200 similar sites.

The Jasenovac Memorial Area states that to date more than 160 mass graves have been discovered, including 105 mass graves at Gradina, covering a total area of 10,130 m^{2}. A further 22 mass graves have been found at the same site, plus an additional 21 mass graves at Uštica, site of a camp for Roma and Serb women and children, the latter with a surface area of 1218 m^{2}. At the Limani site, inside the Jasenovac III Camp site, seven mass graves are located, with a total surface area of 1,175 m^{2}. An additional 3 mass graves are found at Krapje, where mostly Jewish victims were buried. At the Jablanac and Mlaka sites, where mostly Serb women and children were held and murdered, 5 mass graves were found. Four more mass graves were uncovered at Uskočke šume, with 947 exhumed bodies, and one large one at Međustrugovi, with some 1,000 bodies.

The second edition of Vojna enciklopedija (1972) reproduced the figure of the State Commission of Crimes, 600,000 victims in Jasenovac up to 1943. In August 1983, General Velimir Terzić of the Partisans asserted that, according to the newest data, at least one million Serbs were killed at Jasenovac. Novelist Milan D. Miletić (1923–2003) speculated the number at one million or more. Based on documentary material and information from inmates and camp officials, and from official war crimes commissions, archivist Antun Miletić quoted from the sources the estimation at 600–700,000 victims, most Serbs.

An analysis of 1970s high school history textbooks published in Yugoslavia showed that while all textbooks devoted about 1 or 2 paragraphs to Ustaše crimes, there were considerable differences in victim estimates across the then republics. Thus the main 1970's Croatian history textbook had the lowest estimate of Jasenovac victims ("thousands of people"), while the Serbian textbook wrote of "hundreds of thousands", and the Bosnian textbook listed 800,000 victims.

Antun Miletić, a researcher at the Military Archives in Belgrade, collected data on Jasenovac since 1979. By 1999, his list contained the names of 77,200 victims, of whom 41,936 were Serbs.

In the 1980s, calculations were done by Serbian statistician Bogoljub Kočović, and by Croatian economist Vladimir Žerjavić, who claimed that total number of victims in Yugoslavia was less than 1.7 million, an official estimate at the time, both concluding that the number of victims was around one million. Kočović estimated that, of that number, between 370,000 and 410,000 ethnic Serbs died in the Independent State of Croatia, of whom 45–52,000 died at Jasenovac. Žerjavić estimated that 322,000 Serbs died in the NDH, of whom 50,000 were killed at Jasenovac. Both Kočović and Žerjavić estimated 83,000 total deaths at Jasenovac, Žerjavić's figure includes Jews, Roma, Croats and Bosnian Muslims, as well as Serbs. His figures also showed that 13,000 Jews perished in the camp, along with about 10,000 Croats, 10,000 Roma and others. According to Vladimir Žerjavić the number of killed is about 85,000 people, respectively 50 thousand Serbs, 13,000 Jews, 10,000 Croats, 10,000 of Romani people and 2,000 Muslims.

In October 1985, a group of investigators from the Serbian Academy of Sciences and Arts, led by Vladimir Dedijer, visited Jasenovac and made a record of it, in which the record taker, Antun Miletić, mentioned the 1961 excavation, but misquoted the number of victims it identified as 550,800. They also noted the 1964 excavation, and estimated that Gradina held the remains of 366,000 victims, without further explanation.

In November 1989, Živanović claimed on television that their research resulted in victim counts of more than 500,000, with estimates of 700,000–800,000 being realistic, stating that in every mass grave there were 800 skeletons. Vida Brodar then commented on that statement and said the research never resulted in any victim counts, and that these numbers were Živanović's manipulations, providing a copy of the research log as corroboration. A Croatian historian, Željko Krušelj, publicly criticized Živanović and labeled him a fraud over this.

During the 1980s and early 1990s, 700,000 to 1.2 million victims were highlighted in many Serbian publications as part of the SANU memorandum program and also as part of the Slobodan Milosević policy. Antun Miletić, the director of Belgrade's military archives, in 1997 claimed the figure for Jasenovac was 1.1 million, and criticized Žerjavić's research. Another critic of Žerjavić, Milan Bulajić, former director of the Belgrade Museum of Genocide Victims, maintained that the numbers were in the range of 700,000–1,000,000. Bulajić based his estimates entirely on survivor accounts, without scrutinizing the numbers, which led to him advocating for statistical improbabilities. In 1997, the Museum of Genocide Victims in Belgrade identified 10,521 Jewish victims at Jasenovac, with full names. The Belgrade Museum of Genocide Victims had supported the figure of 700,000 to 1 million victims of the camp, but ceased to do so since 2002. After Bulajić retired from his post, Dragan Cvetković, a researcher from the museum, published a book on wartime losses together with a Croatian co-author, giving a figure of approximately 100,000 victims in Jasenovac. In 2013, Cvetković has estimated the total deaths at Jasenovac between 122,000 and 130,000 based on their then-current victim list containing 88,000 names.

In his 1989 book, Franjo Tudjman, the future president of Croatia, claimed there were only 30–40 thousand Jasenovac victims, without explaining how he got these figures. He also claimed "most of the victims were Gypsies, then Jews and Serbs", thus putting Serbs in third place, when all credible sources state Serbs were the most numerous victims. The book met with widespread criticism around the world, not only for reducing Jasenovac victims, but also for downplaying the guilt of Ustaše murderers. Tudjman claimed Jasenovac was administered by Jews, that estimates of 6 million Jewish Holocaust victims were exaggerated, that Jews invented ethnic cleansing, while accusing Jews of genocide and other misdeeds. David Bruce Macdonald writes, "What emerged from Tudjman's extreme moral relativism was the essential insignificance of Jasenovac and, in fact, the Holocaust in world history."

During the breakup of Yugoslavia, the Croatian side began publicly suggesting substantially smaller numbers of victims. In 1991 the new Croatian government established the Commission for the Determination of War and Post-War Victims, which in its final report listed only 2,238 victims of Jasenovac, and only 293 Jewish victims in all Croatia. Later the head of the Commission and former Constitutional Court justice, Vice Vukojević, claimed that "The Jasenovac camp was run by Jews, the [NDH] State only provided guards".

In 1998, the Bosniak Institute published SFR Yugoslavia's final List of war victims from the Jasenovac camp (created in 1992). The list contained the names of 49,602 victims at Jasenovac, including 26,170 Serbs, 8,121 Jews, 5,900 Croats, 1,471 Romani, 787 Bosnian Muslims, 6,792 of unidentifiable ethnicity, and some listed simply as "others."

In 1998, the Croatian State Archives issued an announcement that a notebook had been found containing partial raw data of the State Commission for War Crimes, where the number of victims of Jasenovac from the territory of the People's Republic of Croatia was 15,792, with victims by year: 2,891 persons in 1941, 8,935 in 1942, 676 in 1943, 2,167 in 1944, and 1,123 in 1945. The notebook was generally described as incomplete, particularly the Jasenovac records, but the said numbers were deemed credible as all the other numbers of victims mentioned in the book were consistent with those from the other documents released by the State Commission.

The Jasenovac Memorial Site, the museum institution sponsored by the Croatian government since the end of the Croatian War of Independence, has since stated that current research estimates the number of victims at between 80,000 and 100,000. There have been revisionist efforts in Croatia that greatly minimize Jasenovac victim numbers, or entirely deny that it was a place of mass murder of Jews, Serbs and Roma, instead claiming that Jasenovac was a mere "work-camp, and some of these have received the support of the Croatian Catholic Church, state media, some politicians, and have even obtained state funding.

== Memorial site ==
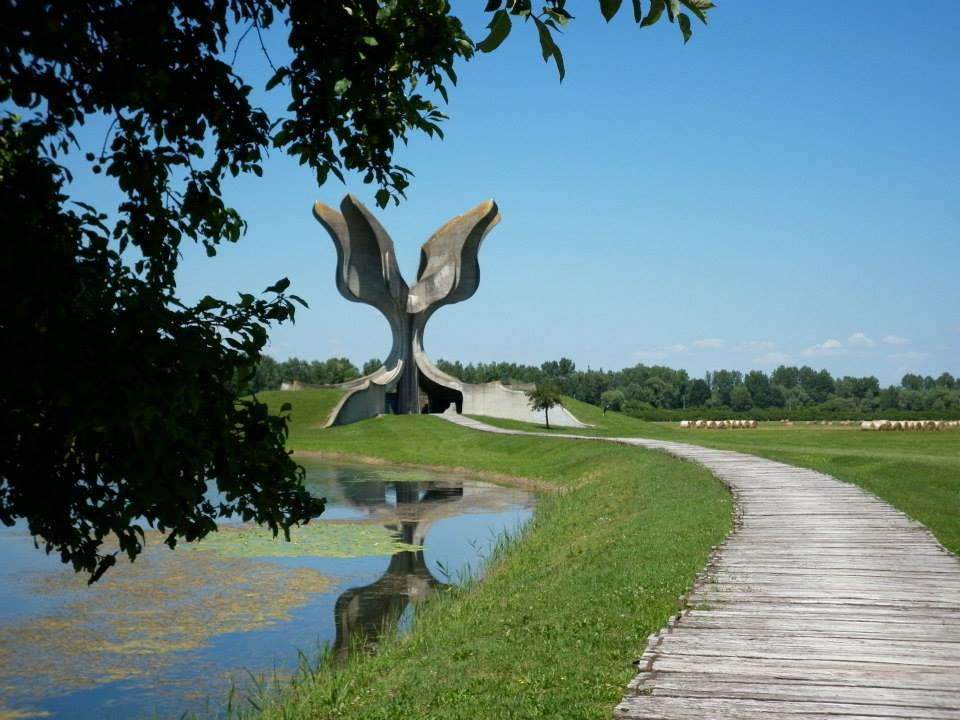
Jasenovac monument by Bogdan Bogdanović.

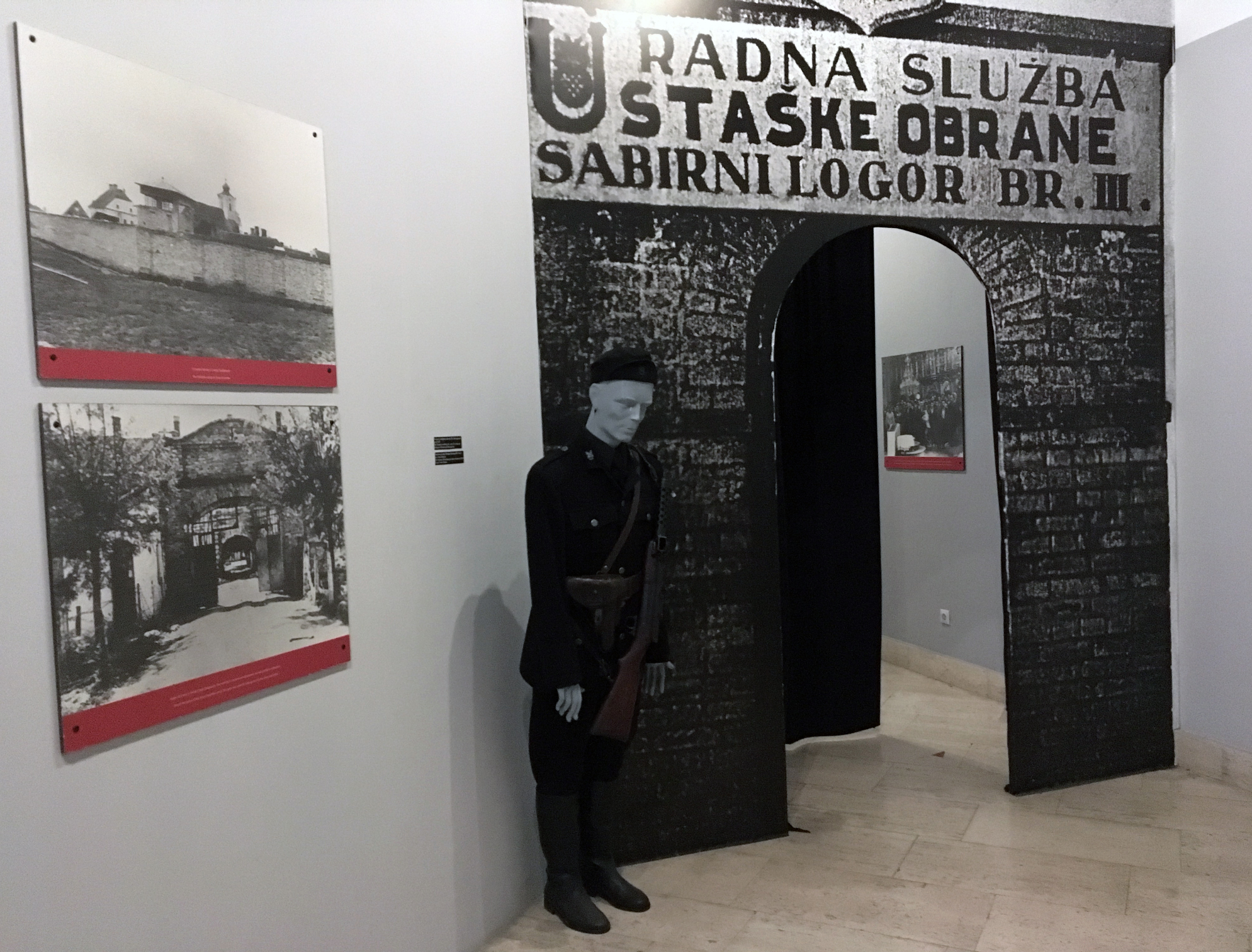
Ustaše death camp reconstruction, museum exhibit in Banja Luka

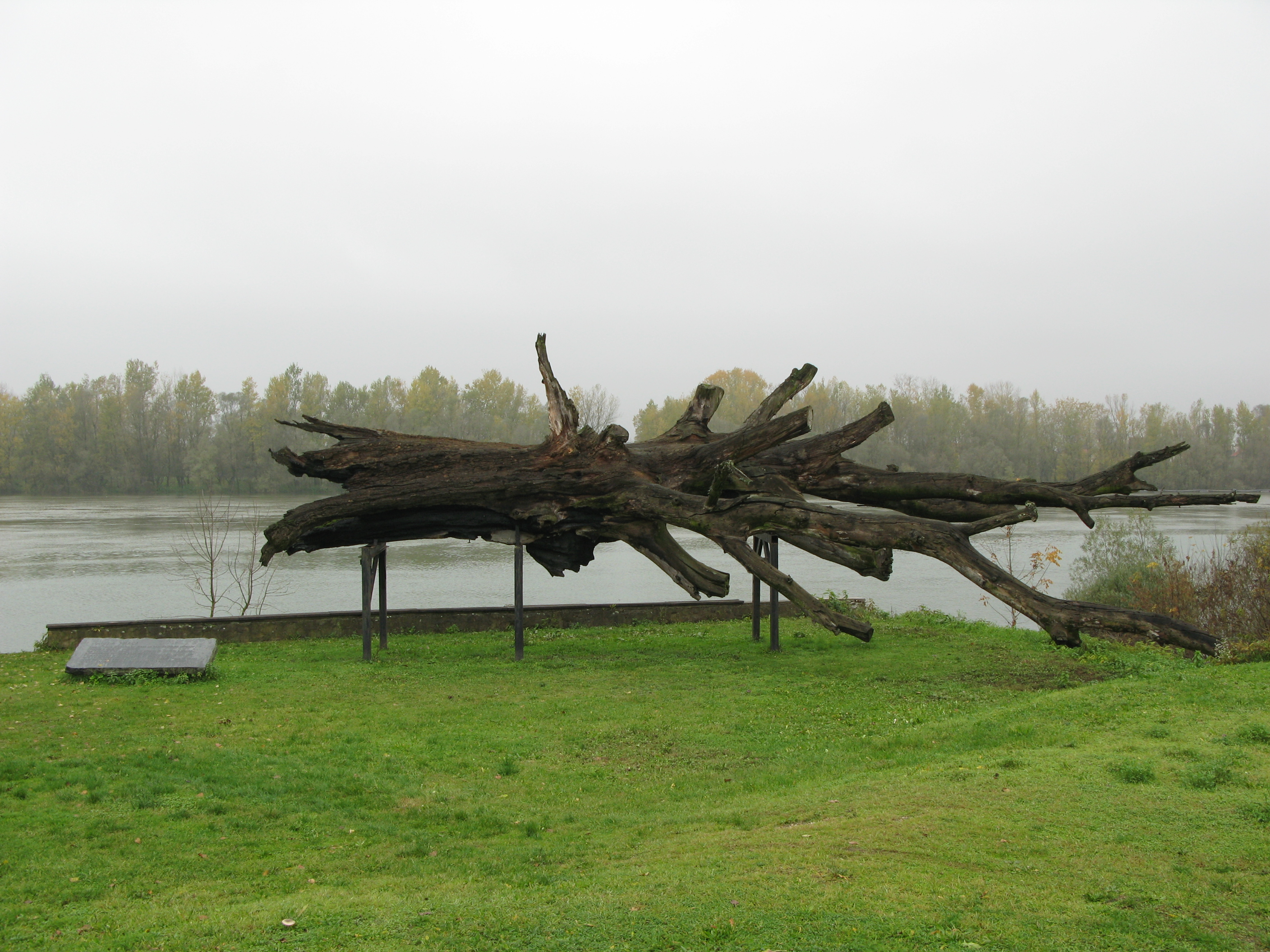
The Poplar of horror

In post-WWII Yugoslavia the emphasis was on memorializing the Partisan resistance, not civilian victims. The authorities sought to present Nazi and fascist occupiers as the main criminals, with domestic quislings being only secondary actors. In the name of "brotherhood and unity" the ethnicity of Ustaše and Chetnik victims was not emphasized. While high Jasenovac victim estimates became frozen, Goldstein notes that specific details – like the Jasenovac-related memoirs of Riffer, Miliša, Ciliga, Von Horstenau and Diana Budisavljević – were almost never presented.

The Jasenovac Memorial Site was established in 1960, on the initiative of the Yugoslav Federation of War Veterans' Organizations. Its central symbol is the Flower Memorial, "a sign of eternal renewal" designed by Bogdan Bogdanovic, with a plaque inscribed with a verse from the antiwar poem "The Pit", by the Croatian poet-Partisan, Ivan Goran Kovačić:

That simple happiness, the window's glint;
Swallow and young; or windborne garden sweet -
Where? – The unhurried cradle's drowsy tilt?
Or, by the threshold, sunshine at my feet?

In 1968, the museum was added to the Memorial Site, with the exhibit focusing on the victims. The Socialist Republic of Croatia adopted a new law on the Jasenovac Memorial Site in 1990, shortly before the first democratic elections in the country.

When Franjo Tuđman was elected for Croatia's president that year, revisionist views on the concentration camp's history came into prominence. The memorial's status was demoted to that of a nature park, and its funding was cut. After Croatia declared its independence and exited the Yugoslav Federation in June 1991, the memorial site found itself in two separate countries. Its grounds at Donja Gradina belonged to Bosnia and Herzegovina, which was then still part of Yugoslavia.

Simo Brdar, assistant director of the Jasenovac Memorial Site, doubted that the Croatian authorities, dominated by nationalists, were committed to preserving the artifacts and documentation of the concentration camp. In August 1991, he transported some of the materials to Bosnia and Herzegovina. As the Yugoslav wars unfolded, Croatian forces vandalized, devastated and looted the memorial site and its museum during September 1991. They were driven out from Jasenovac after a month by the Yugoslav People's Army (JNA). Brdar returned to the site and collected what was left of the museum's exhibits and documentation. He kept the collections until 1999, when they were housed in the Archives of Republika Srpska. This account however is disputed by Croatian sources who say that the Memorial Museum was devastated by paramilitary units after the entry of the Army of the Republic of Serbian Krajina into Jasenovac on October 8 and that archival, museum and documentary material from the site was not destroyed but preserved, and later used in a museum exhibition in Belgrade in April 1997.

In 1996 President Franjo Tuđman announced plans to relocate to Jasenovac bodies of the Ustaše, which led to protests from the US, Israel, the international Jewish Community and Croatian leftists, thus the plans were abandoned.

At the end of 2000, the collections were transferred to the United States Holocaust Memorial Museum (USHMM), after an agreement with the government of Republika Srpska. A year later, the USHMM transported the collections to Croatia and gave them to the Jasenovac Memorial Site. Israeli President Moshe Katsav visited Jasenovac in 2003, and was the first Israeli head of state to officially visit the country.

In 2004, at the yearly Jasenovac commemoration, the Croatian authorities presented new plans for the memorial site, changing the concept of the museum as well as some of the content. The director of the Memorial Site, Nataša Jovičić, explained how the permanent museum exhibition would be changed to avoid provoking fear, and cease displaying the "technology of death" (mallets, daggers, etc.), rather it would concentrate on individualizing it with personal stories of former prisoners. The German ambassador to Croatia at the time, Gebhard Weiss, expressed skepticism towards "the avoidance of explicit photographs of the reign of terror".

The New York City Parks Department, the Holocaust Park Committee and the Jasenovac Research Institute, with the help of former U.S. Representative Anthony Weiner (D-NY), established a public monument to the victims of Jasenovac in April 2005 (the sixtieth anniversary of the liberation of the camps). The dedication ceremony was attended by ten Yugoslav Holocaust survivors, as well as diplomats from Serbia, Bosnia and Israel. It remains the only public monument to Jasenovac victims outside of the Balkans. Annual commemorations are held there every April.

The Jasenovac Memorial Museum reopened in November 2006 with a new exhibition designed by Croatian architect Helena Paver Njirić, and an educational center designed by the firm Produkcija. The Memorial Museum features an interior of rubber-clad steel modules, video and projection screens, and glass cases displaying artifacts from the camp. Above the exhibition space, which is quite dark, is a field of glass panels inscribed with the names of the victims. Njirić won the first prize of the 2006 Zagreb Architectural Salon for her work on the museum.

However, the new exhibition was described as "postmodernist trash" by Efraim Zuroff, and criticized for the removal of all Ustaše killing instruments from the display and a lack of explanation of the ideology that led to the crimes committed there in the name of the Croatian people.

Israeli President Shimon Peres visited Jasenovac on 25 July 2010, dubbing it a "demonstration of sheer sadism".

On 17 April 2011, in a commemoration ceremony, former-Croatian President Ivo Josipović warned that there were "attempts to drastically reduce or decrease the number of Jasenovac victims ... faced with the devastating truth here that certain members of the Croatian people were capable of committing the cruelest of crimes, I want to say that all of us are responsible for the things that we do." At the same ceremony, then Croatian Prime Minister Jadranka Kosor said, "there is no excuse for the crimes and therefore the Croatian government decisively rejects and condemns every attempt at historical revisionism and rehabilitation of the fascist ideology, every form of totalitarianism, extremism and radicalism ... Pavelić's regime was a regime of evil, hatred and intolerance, in which people were abused and killed because of their race, religion, nationality, their political beliefs and because they were the others and were different."

In 2020 the U.S. State Department issued its JUST Act Report which surveys efforts at justice for Holocaust survivors. The report states that while information in the Jasenovac Memorial Site and museum "is appropriately victims-focused, the permanent exhibition notably lacks the requisite historical and cultural context, such as information on Croatia's role in the Holocaust, the formation of and popular support for the NDH, and the full extent of crimes committed inside Croatia".

== Controversies ==
In 1986, a new touring exhibition titled "Concentration camp Jasenovac, 1941–1945" was appointed by the Jasenovac Memorial Museum, sometimes erroneously referred to as "The dead open the eyes of the living" due to that phrase being used in promotional contexts. The exhibition featured graphic photographs with explicit depictions of Ustaše victims, some of which were unintentionally misattributed to Jasenovac. In Croatia, the 1986 exhibition is claimed as Serbian premeditation to stir up war in Croatia which began in 1991, thereby dismissing its complex causes. Similar but more inflammatory exhibitions were shown in JNA barracks during the early 1990s. A description of one photograph read: "They killed children in the mangers, then slaughtered them with knives, axes and razors, impaled them on bayonets, burned in the Jasenovac crematorium and in cauldrons they cooked soup from them". Instead of being educational, these served as a propagandistic tool, writes scholar Nataša Jovičić.

Jewish and Serb organizations, Croatian historians and antifascists, as well as international observers, have repeatedly warned of revisionism and Holocaust-denial in Croatia. Recent examples include the 2018 publication of a book celebrating "the Croatian knight", Vjekoslav Luburić, who as head of all Ustaše concentration camps, including Jasenovac, was responsible for over 100,000 deaths, and a documentary minimizing children's deaths in Ustaše concentration camps. The Luburić book was promoted with the assistance of the Croatian Catholic Church,. and Church sources minimized children's deaths in concentration camps.

Croatian historians have noted that the Church has been a leader in promoting revisionism and minimizing Ustaše crimes. In 2013, the main Croatian Catholic Church newspaper, Glas Koncila, published a series on Jasenovac, by the Jasenovac-denier Igor Vukić, who claims Jasenovac was a "mere work-camp", where no mass executions took place. In 2015, the head of the Croatian Bishops' Conference asked that the Ustaše "Za dom spremni" salute be adopted by the Croatian army. In 2020, the official newspaper of Croatian Catholic Archdioceses, Glas Koncila, published yet another series engaging in Jasenovac- and even Holocaust-denial, with selective, blatantly distorted quotes from Jewish and other prisoners, in an attempt to yet again claim no mass extermination took place in Jasenovac.

Historians in Croatia have criticized the Government's financing of Jasenovac-denier organizations, such as the "Society for research of the triple camp Jasenovac" (led by Igor Vukić), and the promotion of a false equivalence between the various totalitarian regimes as well as between the Yugoslav army in 1945 and in 1991. The chief ombudsman in 2019 Lora Vidović criticized the Government for tacitly supporting revisionism that downplays the character of the NDH. Zagreb University historian Goran Hutinec notes that Vukić massively distorts the truth, for example citing books by Jasenovac survivors, like Milko Riffer, as "proof" that no mass killing took place in Jasenovac, when on the contrary, the books describe eyewitness accounts of bestial killings of thousands, as well as extermination of tens-of-thousands of Roma at Jasenovac. Croatian state television (HRT) has likewise uncritically presented the Jasenovac deniers Roman Leljak and Igor Vukić on morning shows in 2018, prompting condemnation from the HRT section of the Croatian Journalists' Association.

In 2016 the Croatian HOS war veterans' organization posted a plaque in the town of Jasenovac with the Ustaše "Za dom spremni" salute, the equal of the Nazi "Sieg Heil" (the same salute hung on the Zagreb transit camp from which Jews were sent to Ustaše death camps). Despite protests by Jewish, Serb and Croat antifascist organizations, the plaque and Ustaše salute were allowed to remain at Jasenovac until criticism by the US State Department special envoy on Holocaust issues, forced the Croatian government to move it to a nearby town. As a result of this, and allegations of the government's tolerance for the minimization of Ustaše crimes, Jewish, Serb and Croat WWII resistance groups have refused to appear with government representatives at the annual Jasenovac commemoration in 2017.

In 2016 the filmmaker, Jakov Sedlar released a revisionist documentary, "Jasenovac – the Truth", which minimized the death toll in the Ustaše camp, while inventing a "postwar Jasenovac" in which the Partisans supposedly killed Croats. The premiere was attended and praised by 4 ministers of the ruling Croatian HDZ party, including the Minister of Culture Zlatko Hasanbegović. Historians noted the film contained many lies and fabrications, including a forged newspaper headline, proclaiming corpses from the invented "postwar Jasenovac" floated more than 60 miles upriver, to Zagreb. The Israeli ambassador condemned the film. The mayor of Zagreb at the time, Milan Bandić, issued Sedlar the Award of the City of Zagreb despite disagreement in the city Committee for Public Recognition and caused protests from left-wingers, Croatian Jewish and Serb groups, and Efraim Zuroff of the Simon Wiesenthal Centre. Sedlar's response to the protests included a quote attributed to Winston Churchill, but the International Churchill Society denied he had ever said that. The president of Zagreb University, Damir Boras, appointed Sedlar as his cultural advisor, drawing condemnation from Jurica Pavičić in 2019.

== In film and literature ==
Ljudolovka Jasenovac is a novel written by camp survivor and writer Zaim Topčić which was published in 1985. He was imprisoned in the camp in 1943. Topčić was one of few who survived it.

German writer and academic W.G. Sebald discusses and describes the atrocious acts committed at Jasenovac in his 1995 book The Rings of Saturn.

Remake is a 2003 war film directed by Dino Mustafić, written by Zlatko Topčić. Part of the film thematizes the camp.

Witness to Jasenovac's Hell by camp survivor Ilija Ivanović, was released in English language in 2002, and tells the author's experiences as an eight-year-old boy deported to the camp and one of few who survived the escape from it.

44 Months in Jasenovac is a book written by camp survivor Egon Berger which was published in Serbo-Croatian in 1966 and in English in 2016. According to Berger, 250,000 people were killed from June through November 1942.

The film Dara of Jasenovac is a historical drama directed by Predrag Antonijević, whose 2020 release date was to coincide with the 75th anniversary of the camp's liberation. The first modern Holocaust-film about Jasenovac, it stars Marko Janketić as commandant Luburić and Vuk Kostić as Filipović 'Majstorović'.

== See also ==
- Saint Martyrs of Jasenovac
- Genocide of Serbs in the Independent State of Croatia
- The Holocaust
- Jadovno concentration camp
- Kaiser Wilhelm Institute of Anthropology, Human Heredity, and Eugenics
- Concentration camps in the Independent State of Croatia
- Research Materials: Max Planck Society Archive
- Sisak concentration camp
- Stara Gradiška concentration camp
- World War II casualties
- Bleiburg repatriations
- Roma Memorial Center Uštica
