= Catholic clergy involvement with the Ustaše =

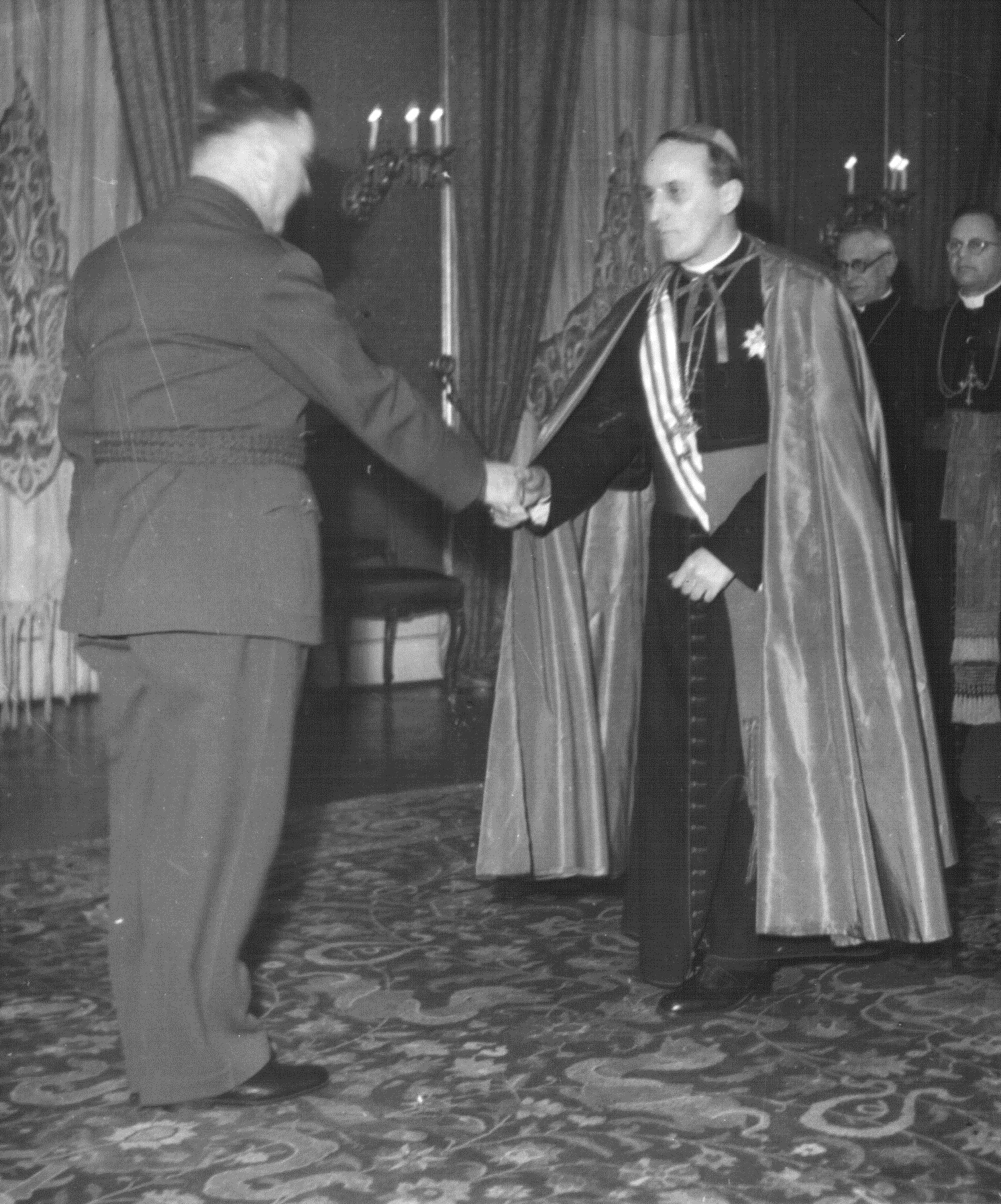
Archbishop Aloysius Stepinac of Zagreb meeting with the Ustaše leader Ante Pavelić in 1941

Catholic clergy involvement with the Ustaše covers the role of the Croatian Catholic Church in the Independent State of Croatia (NDH), a Nazi puppet state created on the territory of Axis-occupied Yugoslavia in 1941.

== Background ==
For centuries, Croatia had been a part of the Habsburg Empire. A variety of ethnic groups have long existed in the region, and there has been a strong correlation between ethnic identity and religious affiliation, with Croats being mainly Catholic, and more Western-oriented, while the Serbs are Eastern Orthodox.

Following the dissolution of the Habsburg Empire at the close of World War I, the desire of Croatian nationalists for independence was not realised, and the region found itself first in the Serb-dominated Kingdom of Serbs, Croats and Slovenes, and then in the equally Serb-dominated dictatorship of Yugoslavia established by King Alexander in 1929. Internal borders were redrawn dividing historical Croatia into several provinces. Political repression bred extremism, and the "Ustaša" ("Insurgence") was formed in 1929 by Ante Pavelić, with the support of Fascist Italy. In 1934, King Alexander was assassinated by a Bulgarian gunman, a member of the Internal Macedonian Revolutionary Organization, a radical group seeking independence, allied with the Croatian Ustaše group led by Pavelić. The new Regent Prince, Paul Karadjordjević, was convinced by the success of Vladko Maček's more moderate Croatian Peasant's Party at 1938 elections to grant further autonomy to Croatia.

On 6 April 1941, Nazi Germany invaded Yugoslavia and Greece. In their military campaign, the Axis forces exploited ethnic divisions in Yugoslavia, and presented themselves as liberators of the Croats. The then-victorious Axis powers set up a puppet state, the Independent State of Croatia (Nezavisna Država Hrvatska, NDH), which included Bosnia and Herzegovina, and the parts of Dalmatia not annexed to Italy. Deputy prime minister Maček refused to collaborate in a puppet government, and Pavelić's Ustaše was installed in power. In Pavelić, Hitler found an ally.

Initially there was enthusiasm for Croatian independence, but the state was in fact under occupation by the German and Italian armies, while the Ustaša commenced a ruthless persecution of Serbs, Jews, Roma and dissident Croats and Bosnian Muslims. Archbishop Aloysius Stepinac of Zagreb welcomed Croat independence in 1941, but subsequently condemned Croat atrocities against both Serbs and Jews, and involved himself in personally saving Jews. The Pavelić government intended to rid Croatia of its Eastern Orthodox Serb minority in three ways: forcible conversion (1/3), deportation (1/3) and murder (1/3). From around 217,00 to 500,000 people (although the exact number is impossible to ascertain and is disputed by different sides) were killed by the Ustaša, both in massacres and at concentration camps, most infamously the one at Jasenovac. Most of the victims were Serbs, but Jews, Roma and dissident Croats and Bosnian Muslims were also targeted.

== Independent State of Croatia ==
=== Creation and recognition ===
Ante Pavelić, the head of the Ustaša, was anti-Serb and viewed Catholicism as an integral part of Croat culture. Historian Michael Phayer wrote that for the Ustaša, "relations with the Vatican were as important as relations with Germany" as Vatican recognition was the key to widespread Croat support. The creation of the Independent State of Croatia was welcomed by the hierarchy of the Catholic Church and by many Catholic priests. Archbishop Stepinac supported Croatia's independence from the Serb-dominated Yugoslav state and arranged an audience with Pius XII for Pavelić.

Author Peter Hebblethwaite wrote that Pavelić was anxious to get diplomatic relations and a Vatican blessing for the new "Catholic state" but that "Neither was forthcoming". Giovanni Montini (the future Pope Paul VI) advised Pavelić that the Holy See could not recognize frontiers changed by force. The Yugoslav royal legation remained at the Vatican. When the King of Italy averred that the Duke of Spoleto was to be "King of Croatia", Montini advised that the Pope could not hold a private audience with the Duke once any such coronation occurred.

=== Pavelić audience ===
Pavelić visited Rome on 18 May 1941 to sign a treaty with Mussolini granting Italy control over several Croatian cities and districts on the Dalmatian coast. While in Rome, Pius subsequently relented, allowing a half-hour private audience with Pavelić in May 1941. In the 1831 papal bull Sollicitudo Ecclesiarum, Pope Gregory XVI had drawn a clear distinction between de facto recognition and de jure, saying that the church would negotiate with de facto governments, but that was not an endorsement of either their legitimacy or policies. Soon afterwards, Abbot Giuseppe Ramiro Marcone was appointed apostolic legate to Zagreb. The minutes of a meeting, taken by Vatican Under Secretary of State Montini (later Pope Paul VI), noted that no recognition of the new state could come before a peace treaty and that "the Holy See must be impartial; it must think of all; there are Catholics on all sides to whom the [Holy See] must be respectful." Phayer wrote that just after becoming dictator of Croatia and "after receiving a papal blessing in 1941, Ante Pavelić and his Ustaša lieutenants unleashed an unspeakable genocide in their new country."

=== Giuseppe Ramiro Marcone ===
The Vatican refused formal recognition of the NDH, though it did not cut diplomatic relations, preferring to work diplomatically to end Ustaša terror. In 1941, Pope Pius XII did not send a nuncio, or diplomatic representative, but an apostolic visitor, Benedictine abbot Dom Giuseppe Ramiro Marcone, as representative to the Croatian Catholic Church, rather than the government. Phayer wrote that this suited Pavelić well enough.

Marcone reported to Rome on the deteriorating conditions for Croatian Jews, made representations on behalf of the Jews to Croatian officials, and transported Jewish children to safety in neutral Turkey.

The Vatican used Marcone, together with Archbishop Stepinac of Zagreb, to pressure the Pavelić government to cease its facilitation of race murders. When deportation of Croatian Jews began, Stepinac and Marcone protested to Andrija Artuković. In his study of rescuers of Jews during the Holocaust, Martin Gilbert wrote: "In the Croatian capital of Zagreb, as a result of intervention by [Marcone] on behalf of Jewish partners in mixed marriages, a thousand Croat Jews survived the war."

The Pope met with Pavelić again in 1943. Pius was criticized for his reception of Pavelić: an unattributed British Foreign Office memo on the subject described Pius XII as "the greatest moral coward of our age." For their part, wrote Phayer, the Vatican hoped the Ustaša would defeat communism in Croatia and that many of the 200,000 who had left the Catholic Church for the Serbian Orthodox Church since World War I would return to the fold.

=== Clergy involved in Ustaše violence ===
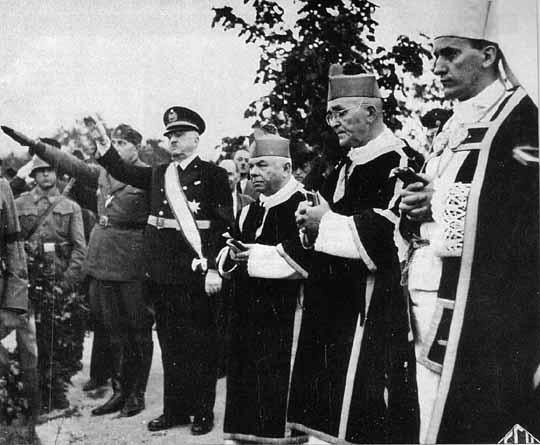
Catholic prelates led by Aloysius Stepinac at the funeral of Marko Došen, one of the senior Ustaše leaders, in September 1944

Mark Biondich notes that "[T]he younger generation of radical Catholics, particularly those of the crusader organisation, supported the Ustaša with considerable enthusiasm, while the older generation of Croat Populists [HSS] was more reserved and in some cases overtly hostile." This generational gap between conservative and radical Catholic priests was further reflected by region (urban vs rural), the geographical location of churches and bishoprics, and an individual priest's relative place within the Church hierarchy. More senior clerics generally disassociated themselves from the NDH. They were also divided by religious orders. The Franciscans, who had resisted for over fifty years Vatican efforts to turn over parishes to secular clergy, were far more prominently associated with the Ustaša than were the Salesians.

Mass murder occurred through the summer and autumn of 1941. The first Croatian concentration camp was opened at the end of April 1941, and in June a law was passed to establish a network across the country, in order to exterminate ethnic and religious minorities. According to writer Richard Evans, atrocities at the notorious Jasenovac concentration camp were "egged on by some Franciscan friars". Phayer wrote that it is well known that many Catholic clerics participated directly or indirectly in Ustaša campaigns of violence, as is attested in the work of Corrado Zoli (Italian) and Evelyn Waugh (British), both Roman Catholics themselves; Waugh by conversion.

The Croatian Franciscans were heavily involved in the Ustaše regime. A particularly notorious example was the Franciscan friar Tomislav Filipović, also known as Miroslav Filipović-Majstorović, known as "Fra Sotona" ("Friar Satan"), "the devil of Jasenovac", for running the Jasenovac concentration camp, where most estimates put the number of people killed at approximately 100,000. According to Evans, Filipović led murder squads at Jasenovac. According to the Jasenovac Memorial Site, "Because of his participation in the mass murders in February 1942 the church authorities excommunicated him from the Franciscan order, which was confirmed by the Holy See in July 1942." He was also required to relinquish the right to his religious name, Tomislav. When he was hanged for war crimes, however, he wore his clerical garb.

Ivan Šarić, the Roman Catholic Archbishop of Vrhbosna in Sarajevo, supported the Ustaša, in particular the forcible conversion of Orthodox Serbs. His diocesan newspaper wrote: "[T]here is a limit to love. The movement of liberation of the world from the Jews is a movement for the renewal of human dignity. Omniscient and omnipotent God stands behind this movement." Šarić appropriated Jewish property for his own use, but was never legally charged. Some priests served in the personal bodyguard of Pavelić, including Ivan Guberina, a leader of the Croatian Catholic movement, a form of Catholic Action. Another priest, Božidar Bralo, served as chief of the security police in Sarajevo, who initiated many anti-Semitic actions.

To consolidate Ustaša party power, much of the party work in Bosnia and Herzegovina was put in the hands of Catholic priests by Jure Francetić, an Ustaše Commissioner of this province. One priest, Mate Mugos, wrote that clergy should put down the prayer book and take up the revolver. Another cleric, Dionysius Juričev, wrote in the Novi list that to kill children at least seven years of age was not a sin. Phayer argues that "establishing the fact of genocide in Croatia prior to the Holocaust carries great historical weight for our study because Catholics were the perpetrators and not, as in Poland, the victims."

Sister Gaudencija Šplajt (born Fanika Šplajt) was a Catholic nun sentenced by the Partisan military court in Zagreb on 29 June 1945 to execution by shooting for aiding, harboring, and hiding a German bandit, the notorious Ustaša Tolj, and other Ustaše after the liberation of Zagreb.

=== Clergy opposed to Ustaše violence ===
Pavelić told Nazi Foreign Minister von Ribbentrop that while the lower clergy supported the Ustaše, the bishops, and particularly Archbishop Stepinac, were opposed to the movement because of "Vatican international policy". Along with Archbishop Stepinac, bishops Mišić and Rožman objected to the Ustaša violence. Hebblethwaite wrote that to oppose the violence of the new Ustaše state, the "Vatican's policy was to strengthen the hand of [Archbishop Stepinac] in his rejection of forcible conversions and brutalities."

Phayer wrote that Stepinac came to be considered as jeudenfreundlich (Jew friendly) by the Nazi-linked Ustaše authorities. He suspended a number of priest collaborators in his diocese. Thirty-one priests were arrested following Stepinac's July and October 1943 explicit condemnations of race murders being read from pulpits across Croatia. Historian Martin Gilbert wrote that Stepinac, "who in 1941 had welcomed Croat independence, subsequently condemned Croat atrocities against both Serbs and Jews, and himself saved a group of Jews." Aloysius Mišić, Bishop of Mostar, was a prominent resister. Gregorij Rožman, the bishop of Ljubljana in Slovenia, allowed some Jews who had converted to Catholicism and fled from Croatia into his diocese to remain there, with assistance from the Jesuit Pietro Tacchi Venturi in obtaining the permission of the Italian civil authorities.

In Italian-occupied Croatia, Nazi envoy Siegfried Kasche advised Berlin that Italian forces were not willing to hand over Jews and had "apparently been influenced" by Vatican opposition to German anti-Semitism. The intervention of Giuseppe Marcone, Pius XII's Apostolic Visitor to Zagreb, saved a thousand Croatian Jews married to non-Jews. The Apostolic delegate to Turkey, Angelo Roncalli, saved a number of Croatian Jews by assisting their migration to Palestine. Roncalli succeeded Pius XII as Pope, and always said that he had been acting on the orders of Pius XII in his actions to rescue Jews.

Yad Vashem has recognised many people from the area of the NDH as Righteous among the Nations for rescuing Jews from the Holocaust, as of 2019 117 from Croatia, 47 from Bosnia and Herzegovina, and 15 from Slovenia. Those include Catholic nuns, Jožica Jurin (Sister Cecilija), Marija Pirović (Sister Karitas), and Sister Amadeja Pavlović, and a priest, Father Dragutin Jesih, who was murdered.

Archbishop Stepinac denounced atrocities against the Serbs. Phayer wrote that in July 1941, Stepinac wrote to Pavelić objecting to the condition of deportation of Jews and Serbs and then, realizing that conversion could save Serbs, he instructed clergy to baptise people upon demand without the normal waiting time for instruction. As Pavelić's government cracked down on Serbs, along with Jews, Roma, Communists and anti-fascists, the Catholic clergy took steps to encourage Orthodox Serbs to convert to Roman Catholicism.

=== Church and forced conversions ===
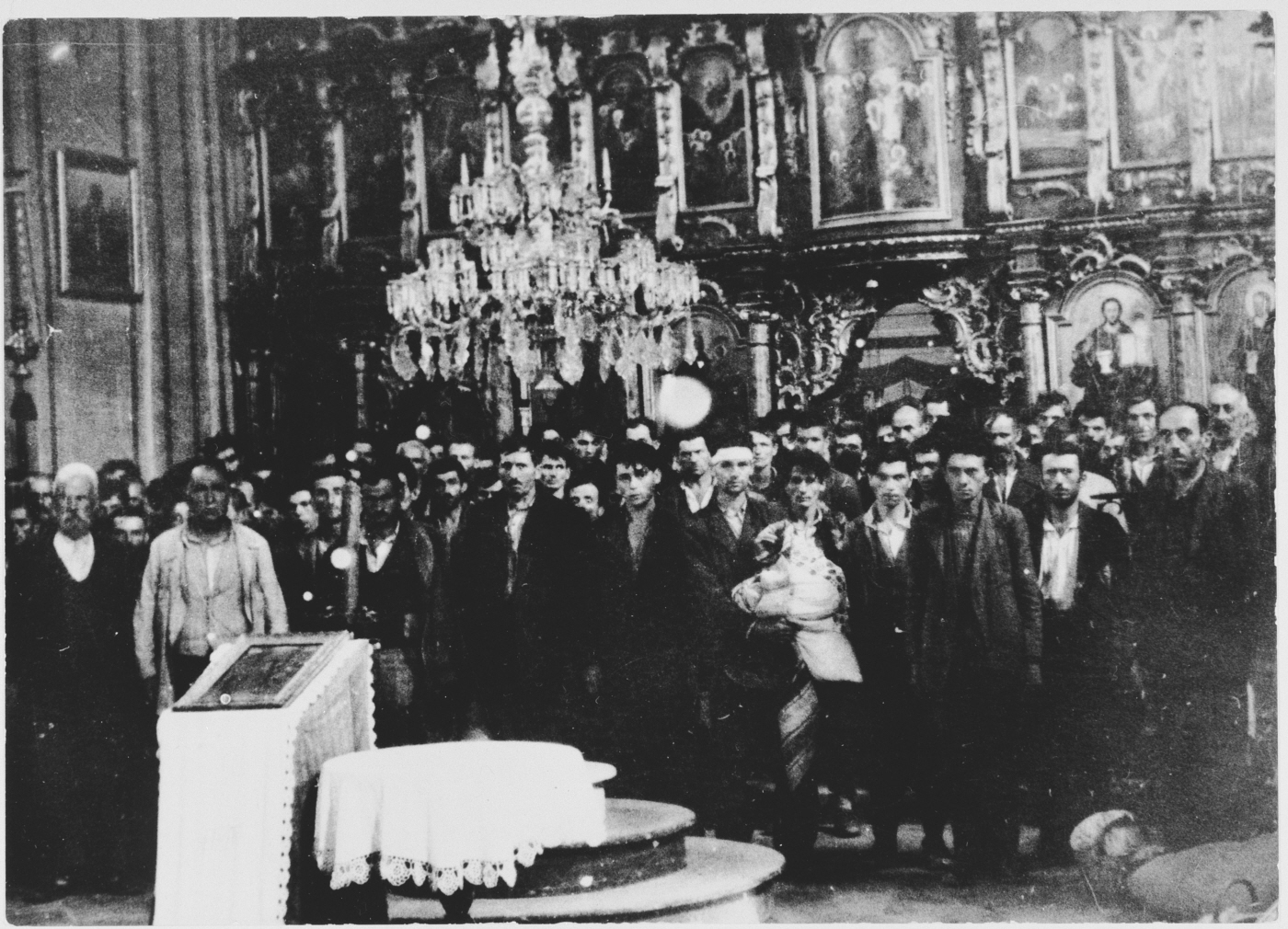
Serb civilians forced by the Ustaše to convert to Catholicism in Glina

According to Matthew Feldman, "[T]he NDH, not the Catholic orders, oversaw forced conversions; it was Ustaša ideology behind the influx of racial – not religious – anti-Semitism in 1941". "[T]his was a secular, not a religious, regime, one that appealed to (and ultimately perverted) centuries-long Croatian traditions of Roman Catholicism to initially legitimate its rule." By 14 July 1941 – "anticipating its selective conversion policy and eventual goal of genocide" – the Croatian Ministry of Justice instructed the Croatian episcopate that "priests or schoolmasters or, in a word, any of the intelligentsia, including rich Orthodox tradesmen and artisans", should not be admitted. Those precluded from the "coming program of enforced conversion" were deported and killed, although many who converted or tried to do so met the same fate, anyway. Croats appropriated many Serbian Orthodox churches as "vacated or requisitioned". The Catholic episcopate and HKP, the Croatian branch of Catholic Action, a lay organization, were involved in the coordination and administration of these policies.

According to Edmund Paris, over 50% of the Catholic clergy were active supporters of the Ustaše regime. Ustaše crimes committed against the Serbian population were generally done so under the pretext of expanding Catholicism in the region. In many municipalities around the NDH, the majority of Serbians interned in concentration camps were sent because they refused to convert to Catholicism.

== Catholic hierarchy ==
=== Archbishop Stepinac ===
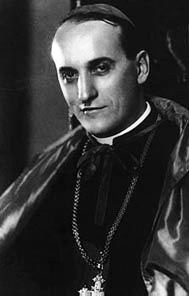
Archbishop Aloysius Stepinac of Zagreb initially welcomed the Independent State of Croatia granted by Nazi Germany, but subsequently voiced criticism of the regime.

Archbishop Aloysius Stepinac of Zagreb was, at the time of his appointment in 1934 at the age of 39, the youngest Catholic bishop in the world. He initially received very little guidance from the Vatican and was given great leeway in how to deal with the rise of the Ustaše. His control over the lower bishops and clergy was not uniform. Historian of the Holocaust Martin Gilbert wrote that, "Stepinac, who in 1941 had welcomed Croat independence, subsequently condemned Croat atrocities against both Serbs and Jews, and himself saved a group of Jews in an old age home."

Stepinac shared the hope for a Catholic Croatia and viewed the Yugoslav state as "the jail of the Croatian nation". The Vatican was not as enthusiastic as Stepinac and did not formally recognize the Ustaša, instead sending Giuseppe Ramiro Marcone as an apostolic visitor. According to Phayer, Stepinac, who arranged the meeting between Pius XII and Pavelić, was satisfied with this step, viewing it as de facto recognition and Marcone as a nuncio in all but name. Stepinac began attempting to publicly distance himself from the Ustaša in May 1941. As the Ustaše murders "increased exponentially" in the summer and fall of 1941, Stepinac fell under "heavy criticism" for the church's collaboration, but he was not yet prepared to break completely with the Ustaše. Phayer wrote that Stepinac gave the Ustaše the "benefit of the doubt ... [and] decided on a limited response."

Stepinac called a synod of Croatian bishops in November 1941. The synod appealed to Pavelić to treat Jews "as humanely as possible, considering that there were German troops in the country." The Vatican replied with praise to Marcone for what the synod had done for "citizens of Jewish origin", although Israeli historian Menachem Shelah wrote that the synod concerned itself only with converted Jews. Pius XII personally praised the synod for "courage and decisiveness". Shelach has written that:

A bishops' conference that met in Zagreb in November 1941 was not ... prepared to denounce the forced conversion of Serbs that had taken place in the summer of 1941, let alone condemn the persecution and murder of Serbs and Jews. It was not until the middle of 1943 that Stepinac, the Archbishop of Zagreb, publicly came out against the murder of Croatian Jews (most of whom had been killed by that time), the Serbs, and other nationalities. In the early stage, the Croatian massacres were explained as "teething troubles of a new regime" in Rome by Msgr Domenico Tardini of the Vatican state secretariat.— Excerpt from Encyclopedia of the Holocaust.

According to scholar Ronald J. Rychlak:

Stepinac, after having received direction from Rome, condemned the brutal actions of the government. A speech he gave on 24 October 1942 stated in part: "All men and all races are children of God; all without distinction. Those who are Gypsies, black, European, or Aryan all have the same rights. ... For this reason, the Catholic Church had always condemned, and continues to condemn, all injustice and all violence committed in the name of theories of class, race, or nationality. It is not permissible to persecute Gypsies or Jews because they are thought to be an inferior race".

Rychlak writes that the "Associated Press reported that "by 1942 Stepinac had become a harsh critic" of the Nazi puppet regime, condemning its "genocidal policies, which killed tens of thousands of Serbs, Jews, Gypsies, and Croats." He thereby earned the enmity of the Croatian dictator, Ante Pavelić. ... [When] Pavelić traveled to Rome, he was greatly angered because he was denied the diplomatic audience he had wanted", although he enjoyed at least two "devotional" audiences with the pontiff, under whom the Vatican granted Pavelić "de facto recognition" as a "bastion against communism". Phayer wrote that Stepinac came to be known as jeudenfreundlich (Jew friendly) to the Nazis and the Ustaše regime. He suspended a number of priest collaborators in his diocese.

Stepinac declared publicly in mid-1942 that it was "forbidden to exterminate Gypsies and Jews because they are said to belong to an inferior race". When Himmler visited Zagreb a year later, indicating the impending roundup of remaining Jews, Stepinac wrote Pavelić that if this occurred, he would protest for "the Catholic Church is not afraid of any secular power, whatever it may be, when it has to protect basic human values". When the deportations began, Stepinac and papal envoy Giuseppe Marcone protested to Andrija Artuković. According to Phayer, the Vatican ordered Stepinac to save as many Jews as possible during the upcoming roundup. Although Stepinac reportedly personally saved many potential victims, his protests had little effect on Pavelić.

=== Role of the Vatican ===
Cornwell considers Catholic involvement important because of "the Vatican's knowledge of the atrocities, Pacelli's failure to use his good offices to intervene, and the complicity it represented in the Final Solution being planned in northern Europe." Pius XII was a long-standing supporter of Croat nationalism; he hosted a national pilgrimage to Rome in November 1939 for the cause of the canonization of Nikola Tavelić, and largely "confirmed the Ustashe perception of history". In a meeting with Stepinac, Pius XII reiterated the words of Pope Leo X, that the Croats were "the outpost of Christianity", which implied that Orthodox Serbs were not true Christians. Pius XII foretold to Stepinac, "[T]he hope of a better future seems to be smiling on you, a future in which the relations between Church and State in your country will be regulated in harmonious action to the advantage of both."

Undersecretary of State Montini (later elected Pope Paul VI) was responsible for "day-to-day matters concerning Croatia and Poland". He reported to Pius XII on a daily basis, and heard of the Ustaša atrocities in 1941. In March 1942, Montini asked the Ustaša representative to the Vatican, "Is it possible that these atrocities have taken place?", and responded that he would view such accusations with "considerable reserve" once the representative called them "lies and propaganda". Montini's fellow Undersecretary, Domenico Tardini, told the Ustaša representative that the Vatican was willing to indulge the Ustaša because: "Croatia is a young state. ... Youngsters often err because of their age. It is therefore not surprising that Croatia also erred."

Stepinac was summoned to Rome in April 1942, where he delivered a nine-page document detailing various misdeeds of Pavelić. This document described the atrocities as "anomalies" that were either unknown or unauthorized by Pavelić himself; it is omitted from the ADSS. However, by 1942, the Vatican "preferred to have Stepinac try to rein the fascists in rather than risk the effect that a papal denunciation would have on the unstable Croatian state."

According to Eugene Tisserant, future Dean of the College of Cardinals, "we have the list of all clergymen who participated in these atrocities and we shall punish them at the right time to cleanse our conscience of the stain with which they spotted us." Pius XII was well-informed of the involvement of Croatian Roman Catholic clergy with the Ustaša, but decided against condemning them or even taking action against the involved clergy, who had "joined in the slaughter", fearing it would lead to schism in the Croatian church or undermine the formation of a future Croatian state.

Phayer contrasts the Vatican's "limited and sketchy" knowledge of the genocide in Poland with "the Croatian case, in which both the nuncio and the head of the church, Bishop Alojzje Stepinac, were in continuous contact with the Holy See while the genocide was being committed." Cardinal Secretary of State Maglione instructed nuncio Marcone that "if your eminence can find a suitable occasion, he should recommend in a discreet manner, that would not be interpreted as an official appeal, that moderation be employed with regard to Jews on Croatian territory. Your Eminence should see to it that ... the impression of loyal cooperation with the civil authorities be always preserved." According to Phayer, the Vatican "preferred to bring diplomatic pressure on the Ushtasha [sic] government instead of challenging the fascists publicly on the immorality of genocide."

However, according to Professor Rychlak, "Between 1941 and 1944, the Vatican sent four official letters and made numerous oral pleas and protests regarding the deportation of Jews from Slovakia." Rychlak quotes a letter from Pius himself, dated 7 April 1943: "The Holy See has always entertained the firm hope that the Slovak government, interpreting also the sentiments of its own people, Catholics almost entirely, would never proceed with the forcible removal of persons belonging to the Jewish race. It is therefore with great pain that the Holy See has learned of the continued transfers of such a nature from the territory of the Republic. This pain is aggravated further now that it appears from various reports that the Slovak government intends to proceed with the total removal of the Jewish residents of Slovakia, not even sparing women and children. The Holy See would fail in its Divine Mandate if it did not deplore these measures, which gravely damage man in his natural right, merely for the reason that these people belong to a certain race."

Rychlak adds:

The following day, a message went out from the Holy See instructing its representative in Bulgaria to take steps in support of Jewish residents who were facing deportation. Shortly thereafter, the secretary of the Jewish Agency for Palestine met with Archbishop Angelo Roncalli (later Pope John XXIII) "to thank the Holy See for the happy outcome of the steps taken on behalf of the Israelites in Slovakia ... [I]n October 1942, a message went out from the Vatican to its representatives in Zagreb regarding the "painful situation that spills out against the Jews in Croatia" and instructing them to petition the government for "a more benevolent treatment of those unfortunates". The Cardinal Secretary of State's notes reflect that Vatican petitions were successful in getting a suspension of 'dispatches of Jews from Croatia' by January 1943, but Germany was applying pressure for 'an attitude more firm against the Jews'. Another instruction from the Holy See to its representatives in Zagreb directing them to work on behalf of the Jews went out on 6 March 1943.

== Aftermath ==
=== Relations with SFR Yugoslavia ===
Following the defeat of Axis forces in Croatia in 1945, the Communist Partisan leader Marshal Josip Broz Tito established the Socialist Federal Republic of Yugoslavia, a Communist state which lasted until 1991. Yugoslavia was the only post-war Eastern European Communist state which had not been conquered by the Red Army. After the war, writer Evelyn Waugh, a Roman Catholic convert, advised the British Foreign Office, and Pope Pius XII that Tito "threatens to destroy the Catholic faith in a region where there are now some 5,000,000 Catholics." According to Phayer, "even before the end of the war, Tito had begun to settle the score with the Ustaša, which meant with the Catholic Church as well, because of the close relations between the two."

Some of Tito's Partisans retaliated against the Catholic clergy for their perceived or actual collaboration with the Ustaše. By February 1945, at least fourteen priests had been killed; by March 1945, as many as 160 priests; by the end of the year, 270 priests. According to Waugh (who visited Croatia after the war), "the task of the partisans was made easier in that the clergy as a whole had undoubtedly compromised the church by tolerating the pro-Axis Ustashis, if not actively collaborating with them." Franciscans, in particular, were singled out for Partisan attacks and fifteen Franciscan monasteries were destroyed. Pius XII sent an American bishop, Joseph Patrick Hurley, as his envoy to Tito (as Hurley carried the title of "regent", this was a step below official diplomatic recognition). Tito requested to Hurley that Stepinac be recalled to Rome; the pope, however, deferred to Stepinac, who chose to remain.

=== Vatican "ratlines" ===
Following the end of the war, clandestine networks smuggled fugitive Axis officials out of Europe. The USA codenamed the activity the "ratline". In Rome, the pro-Nazi Austrian bishop Alois Hudal was linked to the chain, and the Croatian College offered refuge to many fleeing Croatia, guided by Msgr Krunoslav Draganović.

According to Phayer, "at the end of the war, the leaders of the Ustasha movement, including its clerical supporters such as Bishop Šarić, fled the country, taking gold looted from massacred Jews and Serbs with them to Rome." Intelligence reports differed over the location of Pavelić himself. Counter Intelligence Corps agent William Gowen (the son of Franklin Gowen, a US diplomat in the Vatican) was one of those tasked with finding Pavelić; although the CIC hoped the relationship would reveal Pavelić's location, eventually, Phayer wrote, the opposite occurred and the Vatican convinced the US to back off.

By Phayer's account, Pope Pius XII protected Ante Pavelić after World War II, gave him "refuge in the Vatican properties in Rome", and assisted in his flight to South America; Pavelić and Pius XII shared the goal of a Catholic state in the Balkans and were unified in their opposition to the rising Communist state under Tito. By Hebblethwaite's account, Pavelić was hidden in a Salzburg convent until 1948, then brought to Rome by Draganović, who "was a law unto himself and ran his own show and lodged him in the Collegio Pio Latino Americano disguised as 'Father Gomez'" until Perón invited him to Argentina. Phayer wrote that, after arriving in Rome in 1946, Pavelić used the Vatican "ratline" to reach Argentina in 1948, along with other Ustaša, Russian, Yugoslav, Italian, and American spies and agents all tried to apprehend Pavelić in Rome but the Vatican refused all cooperation and vigorously defended its extraterritorial status. Pavelić was never captured or tried for his crimes, escaping to Argentina, where he was eventually shot by a Montenegrin-Yugoslav agent; he later died of his injuries. According to Phayer, "the Vatican's motivation for harboring Pavelić grew in lockstep with its apprehension about Tito's treatment of the church."

Dozens of Croatians, including war criminals, were housed in the Pontifical Croatian College of St Jerome in Rome. By the spring of 1947, the Vatican was putting intense diplomatic pressure on the US and the UK not to extradite Ustaša war criminals to Yugoslavia. Special Agent Gowen warned in 1947 that, due to Pavelić's record of opposing the Orthodox Church as well as Communism, his "contacts are so high and his present position is so compromising to the Vatican, that any extradition of the subject would be a staggering blow to the Roman Catholic Church." Phayer contends that the feared embarrassment of the Church was not due to Pavelić's use of the Vatican "ratline" (which Pavelić at this point, still hoping to return, had not yet committed to using), but rather due to the facts the Vatican believed would be revealed in an eventual trial of Pavelić, which never occurred.

Phayer wrote that Pius XII believed Pavelić and other war criminals could not get a fair trial in Yugoslavia. During this period, across Central and Eastern Europe, a number of prominent Catholics were being punished in reprisals, or silenced as potential sources of dissent by the new Communist governments being formed. The priest-collaborator Joseph Tiso, former President of the Nazi puppet state of Slovakia, was hanged as a war criminal. Rome had been advised that Communist Yugoslavia was threatening to destroy Catholicism throughout the country. In this climate, the Church faced the prospect that the risk of handing over the innocent could be "greater than the danger that some of the guilty should escape."

According to Eugene Tisserant, future Dean of the College of Cardinals, "we have the list of all clergymen who participated in these atrocities and we shall punish them at the right time to cleanse our conscience of the stain with which they spotted us." Pius XII was well-informed of the involvement of Croatian Roman Catholic clergy with the Ustaša, but decided against condemning them or even taking action against the involved clergy, who had "joined in the slaughter", fearing it would lead to schism in the Croatian church or undermine the formation of a future Croatian state.

=== Post-war trials ===
Rožman

Bishop Gregorij Rožman of Ljubljana was the first bishop tried for "collaboration" in Yugoslavia, in absentia, by the military court in August 1946. The case was reopened in 2007 by the Slovene Supreme Court and the 1946 verdict was annulled on procedural grounds. The British occupational authorities recommended he "be arrested and interned as a Ustaša collaborator". Phayer views his trial as a "warm-up for proceedings against Stepinac." After Rožman was convicted, Stepinac was arrested. Rožman emigrated to the U.S. sometime after the war and found a haven in the United States through the intercession of influential clerics. He died in the U.S., a legal alien but not a U.S. citizen.

Stepinac

The Archbishop of Zagreb, Aloysius Stepinac, was brought to trial by the Yugoslav government on 26 September 1946. Hebblethwaite called it a "showtrial for dramatic effect with the verdict decided in advance, it had nothing to do with justice or evidence." Time magazine reported in October 1946 that:

In a Zagreb sports auditorium, brilliantly lit for photographers and 500 spectators, the show trial of Archbishop Aloysius Stepinac and twelve Catholic priests was rolling to a close. Charged by Marshal Tito with "crimes against the people", the 48-year-old head of the world's fifth largest Catholic diocese ... temporarily lost his equanimity. He shook an angry finger at the court, cried: "Not only does the church in Yugoslavia have no freedom, but in a short while the church will be annihilated."

Stepinac was indicted on charges of supporting the Ustaše government, encouraging forcible conversions of Orthodox Serbs, and encouraging Ustaše resistance in Yugoslavia. He repeatedly refused to defend himself against the charges and was sentenced to sixteen years in prison. Phayer argues that Stepinac could have defended himself from the charge of supporting forced conversions, but not the other two charges. Hebblethwaite wrote that Stepinac's support for Croatian independence had been based on the Atlantic Charter and the principle that all nations have a right to exist.

Archbishop Stepinac served 5 years in Lepoglava prison before the sentence was commuted to house arrest. Pope Pius XII elevated Stepinac to the College of Cardinals in 1952. Although Phayer agrees that Stepinac's conviction was the result of a "show trial", Phayer also states that "the charge that he supported the Ustaša regime was, of course, true, as everyone knew," and that "if Stepinac had responded to the charges against him, his defense would have inevitably unraveled, exposing the Vatican's support of the genocidal Pavelić." Stepinac had allowed state papers from the Ustaše to be stored in his episcopal residence, papers crucial to the Ustaše in retaking control of the country and which contained volumes of incriminating information against Ustaše war criminals. Stepinac was transferred back home to the village of Krašić in 1953 and died in his residence seven years later. In 1998, Pope John Paul II beatified him.

=== Ustaše gold ===
The Ustaše hiding in Pontifical Croatian College of St. Jerome brought a large amount of looted gold with them; this was later moved to other Vatican extraterritorial property and/or the Vatican Bank. Although this gold would be worth hundreds of thousands of 2008 US dollars, it constituted only a small percentage of the gold looted during World War II, mostly by the Nazis. According to Phayer, "top Vatican personnel would have known the whereabouts of the gold."

Surviving victims of the Ustaše and their next of kin living in California brought a class action lawsuit against the Vatican bank and others in US federal court, Alperin v. Vatican Bank. Specifically, the Vatican bank was charged with laundering and converting "the Ustaša treasury, making deposits in Europe and North and South American, [and] distributing the funds to exiled Ustaša leaders including Pavelić". A principal piece of evidence against the Vatican is the "Bigelow dispatch", a 16 October 1946 dispatch from Emerson Bigelow in Rome to Harold Glasser, the director of monetary research for the U.S. Treasury Department.

Former OSS agent William Gowen gave a deposition as an expert witness that in 1946 Colonel Ivan Babić transported ten truckloads of gold from Switzerland to the Pontifical College. All the charges were eventually dismissed.

== Contemporary Croatia ==
Each year in December, the Croatian Catholic Church holds the annual memorial Mass dedicated to Ante Pavelić in Zagreb and Split, which frequently attract his supporters.

During the funeral of convicted ustasha WWII concentration camp commander Dinko Šakić, priest Vjekoslav Lasić said that "every honest Croat should be proud of Šakić's name" and that "court which convicted Šakić, also convicted Croatia and its people". These statements were strongly condemned by Simon Wiesenthal Center and Croatian Helsinki Committee.

Croatian president Kolinda Grabar-Kitarović was criticised on live TV by Croatian friar Luka Prcela for saying that the Independent State of Croatia was a criminal state and wasn't independent. Prcela said that the Independent State of Croatia "never killed anyone outside its own borders" and that former two left-wing presidents of Croatia were "anti-Croatian".

In 2017, Bishop of Sisak Vlado Košić was one of the signatories of a petition for the introduction of the fascist Ustasha movement salute Za dom spremni to the official use in the Croatian Armed Forces. On 1 July, Don Anđelko Kaćunko held a memorial mass for Ustasha Black Legion commander Jure Francetić on which he described Francetić as "a patriot who was willing to give his life for the homeland". On 2 July, media published a picture of a Croatian Catholic priest posing for a picture with a group of young boys on a children's football tournament in Široki Brijeg, Bosnia and Herzegovina. Their team was named "The Black Legion" and boys were all wearing black T-shirts, thus alluding to notorious ustasha militia of the same name. On 2 September, while holding a mass near the town of Sinj, friar Božo Norac Kljajo equalized Za dom spremni and Praised be Jesus by saying that these are "both good intentioned, human and ancient Christian salutes which don't hold a single drop of hate or vengeance."

Upon the death of Slavko Goldstein in September 2017, a prominent Croatian writer and publisher of Jewish origin, Mili Plenković, pastor of Hvar, published a Facebook post in which he expressed that he was "happy upon hearing the news that Goldstein died" because according to him: "yet another hater of Croatia vanished from this world".

== Notable people ==
- Krunoslav Draganović (1903–1983), Catholic priest, organized Ratlines.
- Tomislav Filipović-Majstorović (1915–1946; born Miroslav Filipović), Franciscan friar and Jasenovac camp commander infamous for his sadism and cruelty, known as "brother Satan". Captured by Partisans, tried and executed in 1946.
- Petar Brzica (1917–?), Franciscan friar who won a contest on 29 August 1942 after cutting the throats of 1,360 inmates at the Jasenovac concentration camp. His post-war fate is unknown.

== See also ==
- Magnum Crimen
- Clerical fascism
- Catholic Church and Nazi Germany during World War II
- Holy See–Yugoslavia relations

== Sources ==
Books

- Bank, Jan; Gevers, Lieve (2016). Churches and Religion in the Second World War. Bloomsbury Publishing. ISBN 9781472504807.
- Bulajić, Milan (2002). Jasenovac: The Jewish-Serbian Holocaust (the role of the Vatican) in Nazi-Ustasha Croatia (1941-1945). Belgrade: Fund for Genocide Research, Stručna knjiga. ISBN 9788641902211.
- Bulajić, Milan (1992). Misija Vatikana u Nezavisnoj Državi Hrvatskoj: "Politika Stepinac" razbijanja jugoslovenske države i pokatoličavanja pravoslavnih Srba po cijenu genocida : stvaranje Civitas Dei--Antemurale Christianitatis. Politika. ISBN 9788676070411.
- Bulajić, Milan (1994). The Role of the Vatican in the break-up of the Yugoslav State: The Mission of the Vatican in the Independent State of Croatia. Ustashi Crimes of Genocide. Belgrade: Stručna knjiga.
- Cornwell, John (1999). Hitler's Pope: The Silence of Pius XII. London: Viking. ISBN 9780670876204.
- Dakina, Gojo Riste (1994). Genocide Over the Serbs in the Independent State of Croatia: Be Catholic Or Die. Institute of Contemporary History. ISBN 9788674030585.
- Dedijer, Vladimir (1992). The Yugoslav Auschwitz and the Vatican: The Croatian Massacre of the Serbs During World War II. Amherst: Prometheus Books. ISBN 9780879757526.
- Dedijer, Vladimir (1987). Vatikan i Jasenovac: dokumenti. Rad. ISBN 9788609000751.
- Đurić, Veljko Đ. (1991). Прекрштавање Срба у Независној Држави Хрватској: Прилози за историју верског геноцида. Београд: Алфа.
- Evans, Richard J. (2008). The Third Reich at War. New York: Penguin Press. ISBN 9781594202063.
- Falconi, Carlo (1970). The Silence of Pius XII. Boston and Toronto: Little, Brown, and Company.
- Feldman, Matthew; Turda, Marius; Georgescu, Tudor, eds. (2008). Clerical Fascism in Interwar Europe. Routledge. ISBN 9781317968993.
- Fournemont, Jean-Francois (1996). Le Vatican et l'ex-Yougoslavie [The Vatican and ex-Yugoslavia]. Paris: L'Harmattan.
- Kertzer, David I. (2014). The Pope and Mussolini: The Secret History of Pius XI and the Rise of Fascism in Europe. Oxford University Press. ISBN 9780198716167.
- Korb, Alexander (2010). "A Multipronged Attack: Ustaša Persecution of Serbs, Jews, and Roma in Wartime Croatia". Eradicating Differences: The Treatment of Minorities in Nazi-Dominated Europe. Newcastle upon Tyne: Cambridge Scholars Publishing. pp. 145–163. ISBN 9781443824491.
- Lituchy, Barry M., ed. (2006). Jasenovac and the Holocaust in Yugoslavia: Analyses and Survivor Testimonies. New York: Jasenovac Research Institute.
- Nelis, Jan; Morelli, Anne; Praet, Danny, eds. (2015). Catholicism and Fascism in Europe 1918-1945. Georg Olms Verlag. ISBN 9783487421278.
- Novak, Viktor (2011a). Magnum Crimen: Half a Century of Clericalism in Croatia. Vol. 1. Jagodina: Gambit. ISBN 9788676240494.
- Novak, Viktor (2011b). Magnum Crimen: Half a Century of Clericalism in Croatia. Vol. 2. Jagodina: Gambit. ISBN 9788676240494.
- Paris, Edmond (1961). Genocide in Satellite Croatia, 1941–1945: A Record of Racial and Religious Persecutions and Massacres. Chicago: American Institute for Balkan Affairs.
- Phayer, Michael (2000). The Catholic Church and the Holocaust, 1930–1965. Bloomington and Indianapolis: Indiana University Press. ISBN 978-0253214713.
- Phayer, Michael (2008). Pius XII, the Holocaust, and the Cold War. Bloomington and Indianapolis: Indiana University Press. ISBN 9780253349309.
- Ramet, Sabrina P. (2006). The Three Yugoslavias: State-Building and Legitimation, 1918–2005. New York: Indiana University Press. ISBN 978-0-253-34656-8.
- Rhodes, Anthony (1973). The Vatican in the Age of the Dictators 1922-1945. New York: Holt, Rinehart and Winston. ISBN 9780030077364.
- Rivelli, Marco Aurelio (1999). L'arcivescovo del genocidio: Monsignor Stepinac, il Vaticano e la dittatura ustascia in Croazia, 1941-1945 [The Archbishop of Genocide: Monsignor Stepinac, the Vatican and the Ustaše dictatorship in Croatia, 1941-1945] (in Italian). Milano: Kaos. ISBN 9788879530798.
- Rivelli, Marco Aurelio (1998). Le génocide occulté: État Indépendant de Croatie 1941–1945 [Hidden Genocide: The Independent State of Croatia 1941–1945] (in French). Lausanne: L'age d'Homme. ISBN 9782825111529.
- Rivelli, Marco Aurelio (2002). "Dio è con noi!": La Chiesa di Pio XII complice del nazifascismo ["God is with us!": The Church of Pius XII accomplice to Nazi Fascism] (in Italian). Milano: Kaos. ISBN 9788879531047.
- Rychlak, Ronald J. (2010). Hitler, the War, and the Pope (Revised and expanded ed.). South Bend: Our Sunday Visitor. ISBN 9781612781969.
- Simić, Sima (1958). Прекрштавање Срба за време Другог светског рата. Титоград: Графички завод.
- Tomasevich, Jozo (2001). War and Revolution in Yugoslavia, 1941–1945: Occupation and Collaboration. Stanford: Stanford University Press. ISBN 9780804779241.
- Yeomans, Rory (2013). Visions of Annihilation: The Ustasha Regime and the Cultural Politics of Fascism, 1941–1945. Pittsburgh: University of Pittsburgh Press. ISBN 9780822977933.
- Yeomans, Rory (2015). The Utopia of Terror: Life and Death in Wartime Croatia. Boydell & Brewer. ISBN 978-1-58046-545-8.

Journals

- Biondich, Mark (2005). "Religion and Nation in Wartime Croatia: Reflections on the Ustaša Policy of Forced Religious Conversions, 1941-1942". The Slavonic and East European Review. 83 (1): 71–116. doi:10.1353/see.2005.0063. JSTOR 4214049. S2CID 151704526.
- Biondich, Mark (2006). "Controversies Surrounding the Catholic Church in Wartime Croatia, 1941–45". Totalitarian Movements and Political Religions. 7 (4): 429–457. doi:10.1080/14690760600963222. S2CID 143351253.
- Biondich, Mark (2007b). "Radical Catholicism and Fascism in Croatia, 1918–1945". Totalitarian Movements and Political Religions. 8 (2): 383–399. doi:10.1080/14690760701321346. S2CID 145148083.
- Stojanović, Aleksandar (2017). "A Beleaguered Church: The Serbian Orthodox Church in the Independent State of Croatia (NDH) 1941-1945" (PDF). Balcanica (48): 269–287. doi:10.2298/BALC1748269S.
- Vuković, Slobodan V. (2004). "Uloga Vatikana u razbijanju Jugoslavije". Sociološki pregled. 38 (3): 423–443. doi:10.5937/socpreg0403423V.

Conference papers

- Schindley, Wanda; Makara, Petar, eds. (2005). Jasenovac: Proceedings of the First International Conference and Exhibit on the Jasenovac Concentration Camps. Dallas Publishing. ISBN 9780912011646.
