= Edmond Paris =

French anticlerical historian

Edmond Paris (25 January 1894 – 1970) was a French author on history and anti-Catholic polemicist.

== Personal life ==
He was born in Paris to a Roman Catholic family of scholars. Having come from a religious background, he was very much interested in philosophical, religious, and social matters right from his childhood.

After he left Sorbonne where he was a student, he completed his studies in various parts of the world, such as Rome, Geneva, Salamanca, and Montreal.

== Work ==
According to the author Philip J. Cohen, Paris was "the author of several rabidly anti-Catholic works." Cohen also observes that Paris is described on the jacket of Genocide in Satellite Croatia, 1941–1945 (1961) as "a French historian from a Catholic family".

L. E. Lee, writing about Genocide in Satellite Croatia, described the work as frightening documentation of the Ustaše.

The journalist Richard West says that Paris was one of a group of "anti-Catholic polemicists" who used events in the Independent State of Croatia to attack the Catholic Church as a whole. West said that Genocide in Satellite Croatia, 1941–1945 was first published in French, and later in English. It was subsequently reprinted by a Protestant publisher in the United States as Convert or Die..., with a "blood-red cover showing a man kneeling at gunpoint in front of a priest". West said that "In spite of this lurid presentation, Paris's book is based on careful research, much of it from Magnum Crimen. He relies to a great extent on the testimony of Serbs who fled Yugoslavia after the war. However, their testimony bears out what we know of the Ustasha massacres from German, Italian and Yugoslav government sources".

== Bibliography ==
French:

- Le Vatican contre la France (1957)
- Le Vatican contre l'Europe (1959)
- Les mysteres de Lourdes, La Salette, Fatima
- L'histoire secrète des jésuites
- Regards sur l'Education Catholique: à Travers Couvents, Presbytères, Sacristies, Confessionnaux, écoles ... Le fer rouge sur des plaies hideuses (1972)
- Bréviaire de la Superstition Catholique (1974)
- L'enseignement Catholique ou le Merveilleux Catholique (1978?)

English translations:

- Paris, Edmond (1961). Genocide in Satellite Croatia, 1941-1945: A Record of Racial and Religious Persecutions and Massacres. Chicago: American Institute for Balkan Affairs.
- The Vatican against Europe (1961)
- The Secret History of the Jesuits (1975)

== See also ==
- Viktor Novak
- Avro Manhattan
- Branko Bokun
- Djoko Slijepčević
- Philip Vincent
