= Branko Bokun =

Croatian sociologist and psychologist

Branko Bokun (Serbian Cyrillic: Бранко Бокун; 28 June 1920 – 1 January 2011) was an author in the fields of sociology and psychology.

== Early life ==
Bokun was born in Koljane, Croatia, a small village in the Dalmatian mountains of the Kingdom of Yugoslavia. He began to study at the University of Belgrade; however, his education there was interrupted by the German invasion of Yugoslavia in 1941. He fled to Italy, where he enrolled at the University of Rome, studying economics and social sciences. At the same time, he also signed on as an extra with the Cinecittà film studio to earn a living. Later, he acted as a go-between on behalf of the Yugoslavian embassy to the Holy See, communicating with the many Yugoslav Jews who were hidden in Italy at the time. He recorded these years in his Spy in the Vatican, 1941–45 (1973). He also exposed the genocide committed by the Ustashi in the so-called Independent State of Croatia against its citizens, the Serbs, Roma and Jews.

Bokun graduated from the University of Rome in 1945 and went on to attend the Sorbonne University in Paris, taking courses in sociology and social psychology, and graduating in 1949. In Paris, he at one time supported himself by working as a dishwasher.

== Life in England ==
In 1960, Bokun settled in London, United Kingdom, where he remained for the rest of his life. After his death at the Chelsea and Westminster Hospital on 1 January 2011, an obituary in The Times described him as "a beguiling Balkan boulevardier, author and anecdotist, and for half a century a familiar figure in the cafés and bookshops of Chelsea." He left a son and two grandchildren.

== Bibliography ==
- Are We Freaks of Nature?: A New View on Evolution ISBN 1-902914-00-7
- Humour and Pathos in Judaeo-Christianity ISBN 1-86033-441-5
- Spy in the Vatican, 1941-45
- Stress-addiction: A New Theory on Evolution
- Self-help with Stress: A New Approach
- The Pornocracy
- Man — The Fallen Ape
- Bioeconomy — Matriarchy in Post-capitalism
- Humour Therapy

== See also ==
- Edmond Paris
- Viktor Novak
- Avro Manhattan
- Djoko Slijepčević
- Philip Vincent
