= Avro Manhattan =

Italian writer (1914–1990)

Baron Avro Manhattan K.T.
- Born: Teofilo Lucifero Gardini; April 6, 1914; Milan, Italy
- Died: November 27, 1990 (aged 76)
- Resting place: Shotley Bridge, County Durham, England
- Education: The Sorbonne and the London School of Economics
- Occupations: Writer, historian, poet and artist
- Writing career
- Subjects: The Roman Catholic Church, Economics, War, Genocide, History, Role of the Roman Catholic Church in European Imperialism, the Vietnam War, and the Persecution of Buddhists (and other religious groups) in Vietnam
- Notable work: The Vatican in World Politics

Baron Avro Manhattan (April 6, 1914 – November 27, 1990) was an Italian writer, historian, poet, and artist. A born aristocrat who wrote about various political topics throughout his career, Manhattan is perhaps best remembered as the author of several works discussing the Vatican's role in world politics and global affairs. Manhattan attended both the Sorbonne and the London School of Economics.

== Life and career ==
Born in Milan, Italy, on April 6, 1914, to American and Swiss/Dutch parents of Jewish extraction, Manhattan was originally known as Teofilo Lucifero Gardini in his early days in Italy. Before his exile, Manhattan was known to spend his summers at the home of the artist, Paolo Troubetzkoy, in Verbania.

Manhattan, himself a painter, exhibited a number of his works at local Italian museums. The last of these exhibitions was at the Museo del Paesaggio, in Verbania, where two of his paintings remain to this day.

Manhattan was exiled to England from Italy during the Second Italo-Ethiopian War. During World War II, he operated a radio station called "Radio Freedom" broadcasting to nations occupied by the Axis powers. Manhattan officially changed residence to the United Kingdom in 1945 for "political reasons," but not until 1953 did Manhattan legally change his name, relinquishing the names "Teofilo Angelo Mario Gardini" and "Teophile Lucifer Gardini." At the time, he lived in Wimbledon, London.

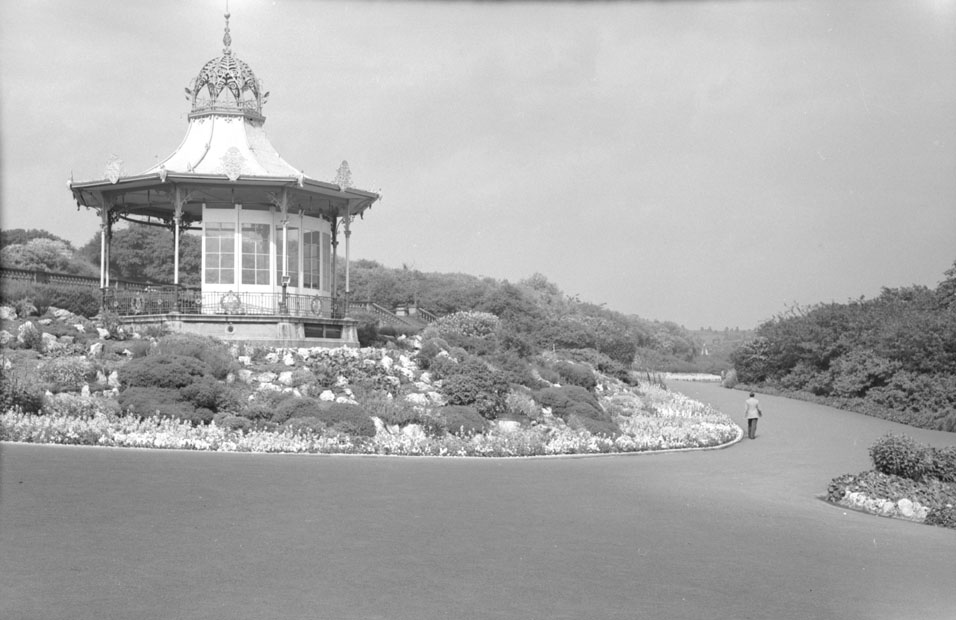
August 1950 photo of the South Marine Park in South Shields where Manhattan and his wife were known to enjoy walking.

In 1961, Manhattan met his future wife, Anne Manhattan née Cunningham Brown, in London, and two years later, they moved into a house on Henry Nelson Street in South Shields, North East England.

He is buried with his wife at Shotley Bridge in Benfieldside Cemetery, Consett, County Durham, England. Their gravestone reads:

To The Beloved Memory of BARON AVRO MANHATTAN, K.T. P.H.d. Knight Commander of the Crown of Savoy, Grand Cross of the Order of Mercedes, Knight Commander of Justice...Malta, Commander Grand Cross of Bethlehem, Writer and historian, Poet and Artist. Departed This Life Nov. 27th 1990, Deeply Mourned and Sadly Missed By His Beloved Wife Anne, Friends and Readership – Worldwide. Also His Dear Wife BARONESS ANNE MANHATTAN Died 18th Jan, 2008 Aged 86 Years.

His friends included H. G. Wells, Pablo Picasso, George Bernard Shaw, scientist Marie Stopes and the Rev. Ian Paisley.

== Works ==
The following is a list of Avro Manhattan's most notable books, ordered chronologically:

- The Rumbling of the Apocalypse (1934)
- Towards the New Italy (Preface by H. G. Wells, 1943)
- Latin America and the Vatican (1946)
- The Catholic Church Against the Twentieth Century (1947; 2nd ed. 1950)
- The Vatican in Asia (1948)
- Religion in Russia (1949)
- The Vatican in World Politics (1949)
- Catholic Imperialism and World Freedom (1952; 2nd ed. 1959)
- Terror Over Yugoslavia: The Threat to Europe (1953)
- The Dollar and the Vatican (1956)
- Vatican Imperialism in the Twentieth Century (1965)
- Catholic Terror Today (1969)
- Religious Terror in Ireland (1974)
- Catholic Power Today (1967)
- The Vatican-Moscow-Washington Alliance (1982)
- The Vatican Billions (1983)
- Vietnam... Why Did We Go? The Shocking Story of the Catholic "Church's" Role in Starting the Vietnam War (1984)
- Murder in the Vatican: American, Russian, and Papal Plots (1985)
- The Vatican’s Holocaust (1986)
- The Dollar and the Vatican (1988)
- Catholic Terror in Ireland (1988)

== See also ==
- Viktor Novak
- Edmond Paris
- Djoko Slijepčević
- Branko Bokun
- Philip Vincent
