= Waterboard =

Waterboard may refer to:

- Water board, an organisation charged with the supply of water and care of water levels
- Waterboarding, a form of torture consisting of immobilizing the victim and pouring water over the face and into the breathing passages
- Water cure, a form of torture in which the victim is forced to drink large quantities of water in a short time
- Surfboard, a narrow plank used in surfing
