= Spy in the Vatican, 1941–45 =

1973 memoir by Tom Stacey

- Author: Branko Bokun
- Publisher: Tom Stacey
- Publication date: 1973
- Publication place: United Kingdom

Spy in the Vatican, 1941–45 is an autobiographical writing by author Branko Bokun. It was first published in 1973, in the United Kingdom by Tom Stacey and in the United States by Praeger.

The book is about Bokun's experiences in wartime Rome working for the Red Cross, and includes a collection of anecdotes on rulers and the ruled, and on the half-world of spies and counter-spies.
