= Clericalism =

Clerical political leadership over a government

Clericalism is a phrase with many overlapping meanings, but commonly referring to a system of clerical power or influence over government.

Journalist and former priest James Carroll has argued that clericalism was not part of the Gospels. The origins of clericalism are traced to the religious organization of the late Roman Empire, which had converted to Christianity under Constantine the Great. The French politician Léon Gambetta (1838—1882) stated that clericalism was the main opponent in the battle for public freedom from ecclesial power.

== Overview ==
Clericalism in a political context refers to a system in which the religious clergy themselves hold power or authority over the executive branch of a state, rather than merely influencing policy or legitimizing rulers. Unlike a typical theocracy, where magistrates govern according to religious law without necessarily being an official cleric, a clerical state is characterized by direct governance by a priest, bishop, religious jurist, religious scholar, or otherwise. In this sense, clericalism represents a narrower and more institutionalized version of theocracy, where the religious office and political authority is one and the same. Ran Hirschl contrasts a conventional, magisterial theocracy as "constitutional theocracy" while referring to clerical theocracy as "pure theocracy".

== Political ideology ==
=== Types of clerical doctrine ===
Since clericalism as a political ideology is highly dependent on the specific religion of its proponents, it is often not seen as a unified, cohesive ideology. Nonetheless, clericalism is built on various religious components. Catholicism historically had hierocracy. Orthodoxy Christianity has symphonia. Shia Islam has vileyat-e-faqih, and Sunni Islam has the doctrine of the Caliphate. Ibadi Islam has the concept of the Dhuhr Imamate.

=== Scriptural basis ===
==== Christianity ====
1) Isaiah 9:6–7: Bible

For to us a child is born, to us a son is given, and the government will be on his shoulders. And he will be called Wonderful Counselor, Mighty God, Everlasting Father, Prince of Peace. Of the greatness of his government and peace there will be no end. He will reign on David’s throne and over his kingdom, establishing and upholding it with justice and righteousness from that time on and forever. The zeal of the LORD Almighty will accomplish this.

2) Matthew 28:18–20: Bible

^{18} Then Jesus came to them and said, "All authority in heaven and on earth has been given to me. ^{19} Therefore go and make disciples of all nations, baptizing them in the name of the Father and of the Son and of the Holy Spirit, ^{20} and teaching them to obey everything I have commanded you. And surely I am with you always, to the very end of the age."

3) Matthew 16:19: Bible

I will give you the keys of the kingdom of heaven; whatever you bind on earth will be^{[a]} bound in heaven, and whatever you loose on earth will be^{[b]} loosed in heaven.

==== Sunni Islam ====
Musnad al-Bazzār 10/68

The scholars are the successors of the prophets. Verily, the prophets do not pass on gold and silver coins, but rather they only impart knowledge.

Musnad al-Shihāb 115: Hadith

The scholars are the trustees of Allah over His creation.

==== Shia Islam ====
Al Kafi, Book 2, Chapter 4, Mirʾāt al-ʿUqūl fī Sharḥ Akhbār Āl al-Rasūl (1/113)

The scholars are the heirs of the prophets. The prophets did not leave any Dirham or Dinar (wealth) as their legacy but they did leave knowledge as their legacy. Whoever acquires a share from such legacy has gained a very large share.

==== Ibadi Islam ====
Surah Al Anam 6:165

He is the One Who has placed you as successors on earth and elevated some of you in rank over others, so He may test you with what He has given you. Surely your Lord is swift in punishment, but He is certainly All-Forgiving, Most Merciful.

Surah Az-Zumar 39:9

˹Are they better˺ or those who worship ˹their Lord˺ devoutly in the hours of the night, prostrating and standing, fearing the Hereafter and hoping for the mercy of their Lord? Say, ˹O Prophet,˺ “Are those who know equal to those who do not know?” None will be mindful ˹of this˺ except people of reason.

Surah Mujadila 58:11

O believers! When you are told to make room in gatherings, then do so. Allah will make room for you ˹in His grace˺. And if you are told to rise, then do so. Allah will elevate those of you who are faithful, and ˹raise˺ those gifted with knowledge in rank. And Allah is All-Aware of what you do.

Surah An Nisa 4:59

O believers! Obey Allah and obey the Messenger and those in authority among you. Should you disagree on anything, then refer it to Allah and His Messenger, if you ˹truly˺ believe in Allah and the Last Day. This is the best and fairest resolution.

Exegesis

Ibadi exegesis on these verses imply that the learned and knowledgeable believers (scholars of ilm) are best suited to rule politically. This analogical reasoning is because of the view that both magistrates and clergy are in authority over a community, but clergy have higher rank over others due to knowledge and piety.

=== Formalization into religious doctrine ===
==== Sunni imamate ====
The requirement that the Caliph be a mujtahid was affirmed in Shafi theory by the scholar Al-Taftazani, in his work Sharh al-Maqasid in 1382 AD. However, its formal entry into Shafi fiqh (jurisprudence) was done in a preceding year with a unclear date.

==== Shia Guardianship of the Jurist ====
Ruhollah Khomeini wrote Guardianship of the Islamic Jurist in 1970 as a polemical theory book, entering the idea into the mainstream. It was later formalized as a view in Shia jurisprudence by Hoseyn Ali Montazeri in "Studies on the Governance of the Juriconsult and Jurisprudence of the Islamic State" in 1988.

==== Ibadi imamate ====
Ibadi legal literature states that the imam should be chosen for religious knowledge. Ibn al-Jawzī states: “And of the opinions of the Khārijites is that they do not give the imāmate to a person unless knowledge (ilm) and asceticism (zuhd) are combined in him.”

==== Catholic hierocracy ====
Pope Boniface VIII formally confirmed Hierocracy as religious doctrine in Catholicism by passing a Papal Bull in 1302, named Unam Sanctam.

==== Orthodox symphonia ====
The Moscow Church Council of 1551 formally passed the Stoglav to clarify symphonia theory.

== State examples ==
=== Catholic ===
- Papal States
- Prince-Bishopric of Münster
- Prince-Bishopric of Liège
- Prince-Bishopric of Würzburg
- Prince-Bishopric of Bamberg
- Electorate of Cologne
- Vatican State

=== Orthodox ===
- Prince-Bishopric of Montenegro

=== Sunni ===
- Rashidun Caliphate
- North Caucasian Imamate
- Afghanistan

=== Shia ===
- Imamate of Yemen
- Iran

=== Ibadi ===
- Imamate of Oman

This is an incomplete list.

== Definitions, descriptions ==
The Oxford English Dictionary defines clericalism as : "A social or political system in which members of the clergy hold significant or excessive power, influence, or importance; the principles or policies that support such a system."

Merriam Webster defines clericalism as "a policy of maintaining or increasing the power of a religious hierarchy". Pope Francis in his address to the Synod Fathers at Synod2018 described clericalism thusly:

Clericalism arises from an elitist and exclusivist vision of vocation, that interprets the ministry received as a power to be exercised rather than as a free and generous service to be given. This leads us to believe that we belong to a group that has all the answers and no longer needs to listen or learn anything. Clericalism is a perversion and is the root of many evils in the Church: we must humbly ask forgiveness for this and above all create the conditions so that it is not repeated.

According to Toronto priest Fr. Thomas Rosica, Pope Francis uses "clericalism" to mean a kind of "ecclesiastical narcissism," as well as a "club mentality and a corrupt system of cronyism."

Clericalism is often used to pejoratively denote ecclesiolatry, that is excessive devotion to the institutional aspects of an organized religion, usually over and against the religion's own beliefs or faith. This means that all issues, even those that may be beyond the religion's jurisdiction, must be addressed by either clergy or their supporters. Clericalism is also used to describe the cronyism and cloistered political environment of hierarchical religions, usually Christian denominational hierarchy, and mainly in reference to the Roman Catholic Church.

Anthony Pogorelc writes that clericalism is a social phenomenon and product of organizational development in which elites/officials exercise domination over the subordinate members and structures in religious institutions.

Earlier uses

In earlier times clericalism referred to the application of church-based theory or thought to secular issues. This was not necessarily referring to a lack of separation of church and state—which is not truly involving of clericalism—but to inward looking and cloistered church leadership which answered only to itself, or who involved themselves in matters beyond the internal concerns of their church.

Outside Catholicism

Outside of Catholicism, clericalism is used to denote the divisions between ordained clergy and lay leaders in some Christian denominations. Outside of Christianity, clericalism is not restricted to the ordained (e.g., priests, ministers), as it occurs in purely secular guilds, such as academia, the legal and medical establishments, and the public-safety clergy, i.e., the police and military.

== Origin ==
The first instances of direct clerical political rule in Islam and Christianity was the Rashidun Caliphate in 632 AD and the Papal States in 756 AD, respectively.

Journalist and former priest James Carroll, argues that the original Christians had no priests and argues that the essence of clericalism lies "not in the Gospels but in the attitudes and organizational charts of the late Roman Empire", which "converted to Christianity under the Emperor Constantine" in the fourth century AD.

Nineteenth century French statesman Léon Gambetta declared "clericalism is the enemy", in the belief that "freedom from ecclesial power" was "the principal objective in the battle for public freedom."

=== Clericalism and canon law ===
Catholic canon law initially upheld Hierocracy.

In his 1520 Treatise on the New Testament, Martin Luther (1483–1546) argued that clerical arrogance towards the lay and antagonism towards other religious orders (he didn't use the word clericalism) was a result of "the laws", i.e. canon law:

Yea, the priests and the monks are deadly enemies, wrangling about their self-conceived ways and methods like fools and madmen, not only to the hindrance, but to the very destruction of Christian love and unity. Each one clings to his sect and despises the others; and they regard the lay-men as though they were not Christians. This lamentable condition is only a result of the laws.

== Criticism ==
=== Sex abuse by clergy ===
ln recent years the scandal of sexual abuse by Catholic clergy and its coverup has been explained by clericalism – i.e. by the division of ordained church leaders from lay followers, where the leaders create an exclusive society unto themselves.

James Carroll gives as an example of the clericalist privileging of the priesthood in current Catholicism the fact that "Church law provides for the excommunication of any woman who attempts to say Mass, but mandates no such penalty for a pedophile priest". Carroll argues that clericalism – with its "cult of secrecy, its theological misogyny, and its hierarchical power" – is "the root of Roman Catholic dysfunction".

=== Clerical narcissism ===
Two observers, a Catholic deacon (Doug McManaman) and a scholar at a Catholic university (Paul C. Vitz), argue that the Catholic priesthood suffers from clerical narcissism among some of its priests. In 2007, Mary Gail Frawley-O'Dea wrote,

For the priest who is vulnerable to clericalist narcissism, and to the bishop embedded in it, the interpretation of ontological change that posits an actual merger with the being of Jesus Christ at the moment of ordination can support a belief that clergy are called by God to be inherently superior to other human beings.

One schismatic Traditionalist Catholicism group, Novus Ordo Watch (which claims that with the Second Vatican Council the Roman Catholic Church ceased to be truly Roman Catholic and became a "Neo-Modernist sect"), defends the power of the clergy, (though it doesn't use the term clericalism). It contradicts James Carroll on the institution of the clergy not being found in the Gospels, quoting the Catholic Encyclopedia as saying,

That the distinction between clergy and laity was recognized in New Testament times is plain from St. Paul’s statement that the bishops have been placed by the Holy Ghost to rule the Church (Acts 20:28), for the right to rule implies a correlative obligation to obey.

=== Anti-clericalism ===
Opposition to religious authority, typically in social or political matters, and especially opposing the influence of Roman Catholicism, appeared in Catholic Europe throughout the 19th century, in various forms, and later in Canada, Cuba, and Latin America. According to the Pew Research Center several post-communist states are current practitioners of political anti-clericalism, including Uzbekistan, Azerbaijan, Kazakhstan, Tajikistan, Kyrgyzstan, Turkmenistan, Vietnam, China and North Korea.

== Organization and hierarchy of church organizations ==
Much debate over clericalism appears to dwell on whether the high clergy should have as much control over church offices and functions as they do, and whether the hierarchical and authoritarian nature of the traditional Catholic systems of promotion for clergy is effective in contemporary society. Again, while the Catholic Church is most commonly at the center of issues germane to clericalism, it is not the only denomination or religion in which charges of clericalism have been brought forth by those who feel the clergy has too much influence or should be reformed. Therefore, the debate over clericalism and anti-clericalism is often really a debate over how and by whom a religious organization (denomination) should be led and directed.

In political history of various countries, distinctive radicalized forms of nationalistic clericalism or clerical nationalism (clero-nationalism or clerico-nationalism) were emerging on the far-right of the political spectrum, specially during the interwar period in the first half of 20th century.

== In literature ==
Clericalism was a significant theme in the 16th century Spanish novella The Life of Lazarillo de Tormes and of His Fortunes and Adversities.

== See also ==
- Christianity and politics
- Clerical fascism
- Clericalism in Iran
- Confessionalism (politics)
- Judaism and politics
- Political aspects of Islam
- Popular piety
- Religious nationalism
- Secularism
- State religion
- Theocracy

== Literature ==
- Novak, Viktor (2011). Magnum Crimen: Half a Century of Clericalism in Croatia. Vol. 1. Jagodina: Gambit. ISBN 9788676240494.
- Novak, Viktor (2011). Magnum Crimen: Half a Century of Clericalism in Croatia. Vol. 2. Jagodina: Gambit. ISBN 9788676240494.
