= Magnum Crimen =

1948 non-fiction book by Viktor Novak

- Author: Viktor Novak
- Language: Croatian
- Publisher: Nakladni zavod Hrvatske, Zagreb
- Publication date: 1948
- Publication place: Yugoslavia
- Pages: 1,119
- Preceded by: Magnum sacerdos

The Magnum Crimen is a book about clericalism in Croatia from the end of 19th century until the end of the Second World War. The book, whose full title is Magnum crimen – pola vijeka klerikalizma u Hrvatskoj (The Great Crime – a half-century of clericalism in Croatia), was written by a professor and historian at Belgrade University, Viktor Novak (1889–1977). The book was first published in Zagreb in 1948.

Immediately after the book was published, the Roman Curia placed this book on the Index Librorum Prohibitorum and pronounced anathema against the author.

== Background ==
Novak wrote a trilogy, of which the last part was Magnum Crimen (the first two parts were the Magnum Tempus and the Magnum Sacerdos). According to O. Neumann, Novak was a Croat by birth, and he has been, since 1924, active among the Serbs. "He was Chair of Croatian History, which was founded at the University of Belgrade in order to promote mutual understanding between the two kindred peoples". One of the determining factors in his life was his visit to Rome before 1914 and his research in the Vatican Archives. As a medievalist, he came into close contact with problems of modern religious life, and took lively interest in relations between the Vatican and Catholic Croats.

Observing the Roman Catholic Church activities in Yugoslavia for more than fifty years, Novak concluded that this Church replaced the idea of service to God with service to the Roman curia, i.e., to the government of the Roman Pontiff in the role of its world leader. As a result of this idea, in the Kingdom of Yugoslavia, the Roman Catholic Church identified Catholicism with Croatian nationhood, which Novak argues turned most of its priesthood into ardent Ustashe supporters.

== Content ==
=== First edition [1948] ===
Viktor Novak was imprisoned in Banjica Concentration Camp in autumn of 1941. In the camp he met refugees from the Independent State of Croatia and heard of the crimes committed by Ustashe and their clerical supporters. After leaving the camp he started to write Magnum Crimen.

The book describes the activities of the Roman Catholic clergy in the Kingdom of Yugoslavia, including their intention and attempts to become above the state, to control the state and eventually the everyday lives of the common people. It has two distinct parts. The first part consists of 15 chapters, covering Catholic clericalism from the end of the 19th and beginning of the 20th century in Austria-Hungary, then in the Kingdom of Yugoslavia. The second part, the last four chapters, covers the rise and fall of the 1941–45 Independent State of Croatia (NDH), and the active support of provided to it by the Catholic clergy.

According to Novak, the main doctrine of the Roman Catholic Church in the Kingdom of Yugoslavia was based on the following:

- the clergy shall be paid by the state as state officials;
- the state cannot have any control over the Church;
- the Church has right to be fully involved in the political life of the Kingdom of Yugoslavia;
- the Church doctrine/religious education shall be a part of primary and secondary school curricula;
- the Roman Catholic Church curricula in the schools shall be obligatory to all pupils whose at least one parent is a Roman Catholic.
- the state should not allow conversion of Christians to non-Christianity nor allow any Catholic to be un-confessional (Constitutional section of the Roman Catholic Church doctrine in the Kingdom of Serbs, Croats and Slovenes as of November 1921)

Josip Juraj Strossmayer's ideas, of which the most important one was that serving God is equal to serving the people, created close relations between ethnic Croats and Serbs by introducing the Old Church Slavonic language as the liturgical language of the Catholic church in the Balkans and were aggressively suppressed by the Catholic clergy in Croatia and Slovenia.

Ante Pavelić's nationalism identified Catholicism with the Croat people, which was actively supported and interpreted by the clergy.

The second part of this book focuses on the establishment of the 1941–45 Independent State of Croatia (NDH), the active support extended to the state by the Catholic clergy, and the clergy's involvement and support in the extermination and/or forceful conversion of the Orthodox Serbs as well as the extermination of the Jews and the Roma people.

Novak bases his gloomy picture of the NDH and the wartime not only on written documents which, despite strict police measures found their way to the occupied capital, but also on personal narratives by some of his fellow prisoners in the Banjica konclogor.

Archbishop Aloysius Stepinac is portrayed in this book as an ardent Catholic crusader who publicly endorsed the establishment of the NDH, acknowledged the Ustashe as Croatian patriots, defended it before the Roman Pope and was responsible for the racist attitude and behaviour of his clergy.

Historians L. Hory and Martin Broszat wrote that the second part of this book, about the Independent State of Croatia crimes, was based on the Yugoslav state commission whose role was to investigate the crimes of the occupying powers and their Ustashe accomplices in World War II and the Croatian Catholic Church press.

=== English language edition [2011] ===
This edition, except from being an English language translation of the 1948 edition, contains two new chapters - XIV. Ecclesia militants at war with the ideology of Tyrš, and XV. Libellus accusations, both omitted in the original version under the pressure of Josip Broz Tito's OZNA chief Maks Baće.

Chapter XIV is about the Sokol Society (Falcon), founded in Prague in 1862 by Jindřich Fügner and Miroslav Tyrš. The goal of the Sokol Society was to revive and enhance the national awareness and promote mental and physical health of the Czech people through sports and moral education. The idea soon gained a pan-Slavic character, and Sokol organizations were later established in Croatia, Slovenia, Serbia, Bulgaria, Poland, and Russia. The Sokol movement had full support from Strossmayer, then Bishop of Đakovo. After the dissolution of Austria-Hungary and the establishment of the Kingdom of Serbs, Croats, and Slovenes in 1918, and under the leadership of Lazar Car, Croatian Sokol societies were united with Serbian and Slovenian Sokol clubs into a large Sokol Alliance on 15 June 1919.

The separatism-prone Croatian clergy forced Croatian Sokols to leave the Yugoslav Sokol Alliance in 1919–20, fueling internal conflicts within the Alliance on political grounds. At the same time, high Catholic clergy established the Orlovi (Eagles) clerical organization with the aim of taking youths away from the Alliance. The Croatian Catholic Church rejected the pan-Slavic idea of bringing together Catholic, Orthodox, and Muslim believers under the motto that "a brother is dear regardless of his faith". The two Catholic organizations, Orlovi (Eagles) and Katolička Akcija (Catholic Action) were a main base of this resistance to the idea of Yugoslavism, brotherhood and religious tolerance. The Catholic Church's resistance to this idea of pan-Slavism led the Polish Sokols to abstain from the international All Sokol Rally held in Prague in 1926.

Chapter XV, titled Libellus Accusations, is about a few Croatian clergymen who were followers of Strossmayer's idea (namely, that to serve people means to serve God). The most prominent among them was Frano Ivanišević, a national fighter and promoter of Old Slavonic Church language as the language of liturgy in the Croatian Catholic Church. He demonstrated that a Catholic priest serving his people would not be against his Church and faith.

== Reception ==
The earliest international surveys of the book are the ones written by Russian S. Troicky (1949) and the Swede Oscar Neumann (1950). Neumann stressed three things particular to this book: the role of Novak in spreading and defending the idea of Yugoslavism, the abundance of documents used to support the book content, and the imbalance in tone, stating that "Some passages have been written by a scholar in a dignified academic gown, in other parts of the book the author assumes the role of public prosecutor." The abridged edition of this book published in 1960 in Sarajevo was reviewed in the Yugoslav journal of history, Istorijski glasnik, that same year by Yugoslav historian Branko Petranović, and the same review was echoed in the Historical abstracts.

William Bundy gave a short survey of this book, the full text of which is: A Yugoslav historian's lengthy indictment of clericalism in Croatia over the past half-century. The latter half of the book, covering the period of "independent" Croatian state of Ante Pavelić on the basis of a wealth of material from many sources, pays particular attention to the role of Archbishop Stepinac.

There is a number of authors who left short negative notes about the book. These include John R. Lampe (the book is not impartial), John Neubauer (commissioned by the communist authorities) or completely rejecting it, Robin Harris (as slanderous, anti-catholic).

Hubert Butler used Magnum Crimen as a starting reference for his research about the Croatian Society of St. Jerome in Rome and its support to the Ustashe during the Second World War and after.

The book has seven full editions, and one abridged where the full 1986 edition was released with a foreword by Jakov Blažević.

The most recent, 2011 edition, translated into English, was published in two volumes, and includes two chapters which had been excluded from all earlier editions of this book, which, according to Serbian historian Vasilije Krestić, were censored upon the request of two Croatian communist leaders, Vladimir Bakarić and Maks Baće. As reported by the Serbian daily Politika, the publication of the English language edition was financed by a schoolmate of Milorad Ekmečić, who also wrote the foreword to the edition. According to the same article, the publication of the English translation was coincided with the Croatia's lawsuit against Serbia in front of the International Court of Justice, so that "the world would be informed about Ustashe crimes against Serbs during the Second World War".

== See also ==
- Catholic Church in Croatia
- Catholic clergy involvement with the Ustaše
- Genocide of Serbs in the Independent State of Croatia

== Sources ==
- Novak, Viktor (1948). Magnum Crimen: Pola vijeka klerikalizma u Hrvatskoj. Zagreb: Nakladni zavod Hrvatske.
- Magnum Crimen - в продолжение темы...
- Rivelli, Marco Aurelio (1998). Le génocide occulté: État Indépendant de Croatie 1941–1945 [Hidden Genocide: The Independent State of Croatia 1941–1945] (in French). Lausanne: L'age d'Homme. ISBN 9782825111529.
