= Schwedentrunk =

Method of torture

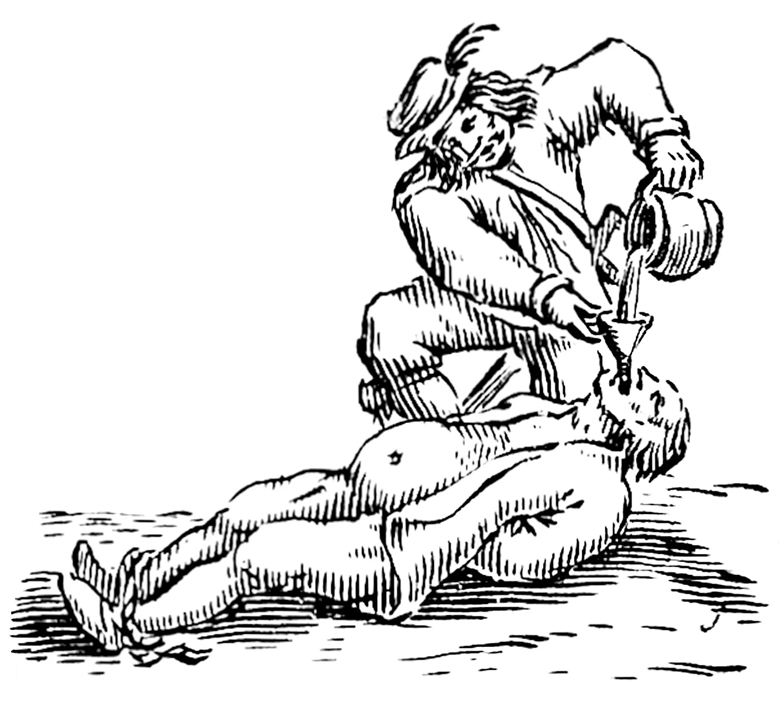
"pisse poured down there throates" - illustration from The Lamentations of Germany by Philip Vincent, published 1638

The Schwedentrunk (German: [ˈʃveːdn̩ˌtʁʊŋk], Swedish drink) is a method of torture and execution in which the victim is forced to swallow large amounts of a foul liquid, such as excrement. The name was invented by German victims of Swedish troops during the Thirty Years' War. This method of torture was administered by other international troops, mercenaries, and marauders, and especially by civilians following the Swedish baggage train, who received no pay. It was used to force peasants or town citizens to hand over hidden money, food, animals, etc., or to rape women.

The memory of the Schwedentrunk was immortalized in one of the first widely read German books, the satirical Der abenteuerliche Simplicissimus published by Hans Jakob Christoffel von Grimmelshausen in 1668.

== Mechanism ==
Den Knecht legten sie gebunden auf die Erd, stecketen ihm ein Sperrholz ins Maul, und schütteten ihm einen Melkkübel voll garstig Mistlachenwasser in Leib, das nenneten sie ein Schwedischen Trunk.

— Grimmelshausen, Simplicissimus, bk. I, ch. 4,

Its English translation is:

They laid the bound soldier on the ground, stuck a wooden wedge into his mouth, and poured into his belly a bucket full of disgusting liquid manure, which they called a Swedish Drink.

— Grimmelshausen, Simplicissimus, bk. I, ch. 4,

Use of the Schwedentrunk is recorded in the histories of towns throughout Southern Germany. Though specific circumstances differed, in every case a restrained and gagged victim was forced to swallow (by means of a funnel) a large amount of unappetizing, sometimes boiling liquid. Substances such as urine, excrement, liquid manure, and sullage were used for this purpose.

Apart from disgust, illness, and the possibility of bacterial infection, the Schwedentrunk inflicted intense gastric pain. Because liquids are incompressible, the victim's stomach and bowels must expand to painful proportions to accommodate the copious quantities of fluid. The torturers then squeezed the distended belly with wooden boards, trampled the victim underfoot or beat them with sticks. Sometimes a victim was stabbed with spears in the stomach.

== See also ==
- Water cure (torture) – Form of torture
- Waterboarding – Torture method simulating drowning
