= Viktor Novak =

Yugoslav Croat historian (1889–1977)

- Born: 4 February 1889; Donja Stubica, Kingdom of Croatia-Slavonia, Austria-Hungary
- Died: 1 January 1977 (aged 87); Belgrade, SR Serbia, SFR Yugoslavia
- Occupation: historian
- Known for: full member of the Serbian Academy of Sciences and Arts (SANU), and a corresponding member of the Yugoslav Academy of Sciences and Arts (JAZU)
- Notable work: Magnum Crimen (The Great Crime - a half-century of clericalism in Croatia)

Viktor Novak (4 February 1889 – 1 January 1977) was a Yugoslav Croat historian, professor at the University of Belgrade and full member of the Serbian Academy of Sciences and Arts (SANU), and a corresponding member of the Yugoslav Academy of Sciences and Arts (JAZU).

== Biography ==
While working at the University of Zagreb, Novak, an ethnic Croat, was frequently attacked by Croatian nationalists for his balanced approach to the history of South Slavs and for his pan-Slavic Yugoslavist persuasion. From 1920 to 1924 he held the chair of Auxiliary Sciences of History at the Faculty of Philosophy in Zagreb. Novak left his position there in 1924 to go to the University of Belgrade. Viktor Novak dedicated many years to the extensive research of clericalism and extreme nationalism among Roman Catholic Croats in Croatia, Slavonia, and Dalmatia. He did extensive research on the cultural and political foundations of the Yugoslav movement in the nineteenth century (with works on key persons such as Josip Juraj Strossmayer, Franjo Rački, and Natko Nodilo), as well as on the relations between the reformer of the Serbian alphabet Vuk Stefanović Karadžić and members of the Croatian Illyrian movement.

In Belgrade, Novak's writings represented a strict Yugoslav unitary concept. During the January 6 Dictatorship, Novak wrote his Antologija jugoslovenske misli i narodnog jedinstva (Anthology of Yugoslav Consciousness and National Unity). According to historian Ivan Mužić, the work was an attempt "to justify a newly conceived myth of a three-tribed nation and its ostensible united national consciousness which dates to the sixth century". Novak would write: The future generations, freed of atavistic woes, with the aid of conscious national education, can bear in their hearts one great and holy idea, which will safeguard the people from external and internal enemies. That idea is the Yugoslav idea alone. In Belgrade Novak was a member of the Yugoslav Cultural Club and wrote in its unofficial journal Vidici. Novak would write in Serbian ekavian while working in Belgrade.

Novak authored Magnum Tempus, Magnum Sacerdos and Magnum Crimen (The Great Crime - a half-century of clericalism in Croatia), a trilogy about the Roman Catholic Church in Yugoslavia and its relation to the Kingdom of Yugoslavia, the Roman Curia, and the Croatian clerical nationalism including Ustashe supporters and World War II. From 1929 to 1959, he was a professor of Yugoslav history at the University of Belgrade. The Vatican Curia placed Magnum Crimen on their list of banned books Index librorum prohibitorum and named Viktor Novak "an enemy of Catholic Church".

As an ardent Yugoslav patriot and anti-fascist activist, Viktor Novak was during the Second World War arrested and spent some time in the Nazi detention camp at Banjica, near Belgrade.

After the Second World War, Novak continued teaching Yugoslav history and methodology of history at the University of Belgrade. He was later elected to membership of the Serbian Academy of Sciences and Arts (SANU; corresponding member in 1948 and full member in 1961) and was made head of the Department for Social Sciences of the Academy (1966–1969). Novak was co-founder and first director of the History Institute of SANU (Istorijski institut SANU) from 1947 to 1954. He was also praised for his books on Latin paleography, which are considered to be seminal works on the subject in Serbian historiography.

Magnum Crimen, which is considered the main source of first-hand accounts of close relations between Croatian clericalism and pro-Nazi Croatian Ustashas, that led to the genocide against the Serbs, Jews, and Roma in the 1941–45 Independent State of Croatia, was first published in 1948, and again in an abridged version in 1960 in Sarajevo. The 1948 edition, reprinted several times in Belgrade after 1986, was highly acclaimed as a masterpiece left in oblivion.

'The English edition of his magnum opus - Magnum Crimen was completed eventually in 2011 and published in two volumes on more than 1,300 pages, with two chapters that were omitted from the first edition in 1948, due to the communist censorship.

Viktor Novak was decorated with the Order of St. Sava bestowed by the Serbian Orthodox Church.

== Selected works ==
- Scriptura Beneventana s osobitim obzirom na tip dalmatinske beneventane, Zagreb 1920.
- Evangeliarium Spalatense, Split 1923.
- Franjo Rački u govorima i raspravama, Zagreb 1925.
- Maksimilijan Vrhovac, Bratstvo, Beograd 1928.
- Notae palaeographicae, chronologicae et historicae, Journal of the Zagreb Archaeological Museum, Vol.15 No.1 January (1928)
- Aliquid de nominibus ducum Croatorum in antiquissimo evangeliario Cividalensi. Nota palaeographico-historica, Zbornik u čast Bogdana Popovića, Beograd 1929.
- Franjo Rački, Bratstvo, Beograd 1929.
- Masarik i Jugosloveni, SKG, Beograd 1930.
- Sveslavenska misao, Ljubljana 1930.
- Antologija jugoslovenske misli i narodnog jedinstva, Štampa državne štamparije, Belgrade 1930
- Mihailo Polit-Desančić i Hrvati, LMS, Novi Sad 1932.
- Natko Nodilo, Novi Sad 1935.
- Le Roi Alexandre Ier Karageorgevitch et la Formation de l'Unité Nationale Yougoslave, Paris : Amitiés franco-yougoslaves, 1935.
- Rad Stanoja Stanojevića na srpskoj diplomatici, Glasnik Istorijskog društva u Novom Sadu, 1938.
- Dva antipoda. Štrosmajer i Mihanović, Beograd 1940.
- J. J. Štrosmajer, apostol jugoslovenske misli, Savez sokola kraljevine Jugoslavije, Belgrade 1941
- Oko Trsta [editor], Državni izdavački zavod Jugoslavije, Belgrade, 1945.
- Novak, Viktor (1948). Magnum Crimen: Pola vijeka klerikalizma u Hrvatskoj. Zagreb: Nakladni zavod Hrvatske.
  - Novak, Viktor (1960). Velika optužba (Magnum crimen): Pola vijeka klerikalizma u Hrvatskoj. Vol. 1. Sarajevo: Svjetlost.
  - Novak, Viktor (1960). Velika optužba (Magnum crimen): Pola vijeka klerikalizma u Hrvatskoj. Vol. 2. Sarajevo: Svjetlost.
  - Novak, Viktor (1960). Velika optužba (Magnum crimen): Pola vijeka klerikalizma u Hrvatskoj. Vol. 3. Sarajevo: Svjetlost.
  - Novak, Viktor (1986). Magnum Crimen: Pola vijeka klerikalizma u Hrvatskoj. Beograd: Nova knjiga. ISBN 978-86-7604-928-8.
  - Novak, Viktor (1989). Magnum Crimen: Pola vijeka klerikalizma u Hrvatskoj. Beograd: Nova knjiga.
  - Novak, Viktor (2011). Magnum Crimen: Half a Century of Clericalism in Croatia. Vol. 1. Jagodina: Gambit. ISBN 978-86-7624-049-4.
  - Novak, Viktor (2011). Magnum Crimen: Half a Century of Clericalism in Croatia. Vol. 2. Jagodina: Gambit. ISBN 978-86-7624-049-4.
- Ferdo Šišić, Ljetopis JA, 1949, 54.
- Jedno sporno pitanje iz srpsko-hrvatskih odnosa 60-tih godina prošlog veka, Istorijski časopis, 1-2, Belgrade 1949
- Principium et finis - veritas (Concerning the Case of Archbishop Stepinac), Review of International Affairs, Volumes 1-2, Socialist Alliance of the Working People of Yugoslavia, 1950
- Supetarski kartular, Djela JA, 1952, 43.
- Latinska paleografija, Beograd 1952, 1980 2nd edition.
- Vatikan i Jugoslavija, I, Belgrade 1953 (ed., na srpskohrvatskom, francuskom i engleskom jeziku).
- Outline of Jugoslav Historiography, Ten Years of Jugoslav Historiography, 1945–1955, Beograd 1955.
- Natko Nodilo, Zadarska revija, 1955.
- Paleografija i slavensko-latinska simbioza od VII–XV stoljeća, Istorijski časopis, Beograd 1957.
- Franjo Rački, Beograd, Prosveta 1958.
- Nikola Vulić, naučnik i čovek. Uvod u knjigu N. Vulića: Iz rimske književnosti, SKZ, Beograd 1959.
- Valtazar Bogišić i Franjo Rački. Prepiska (1866–1893), Zbornik za istoriju, jezik i književnost srpskog naroda, SAN, I od., vol. XXV, Beograd 1960.
- Pojava i proširenje karolinške minuskule u Dalmaciji, Glas SAN, vol. CCLV, Beograd 1963.
- Вук и Хрвати [Vuk and Croats]: примљено на VII скупу Одељења друштвених наука САНУ, 27. IX 1966, по приказу самог аутора, Београд, 1967.
- Magnum tempus : ilirizam i katoličko sveštenstvo : ideje i ličnosti 1830-1849, Beograd, Nova knjiga 1987.ISBN 86-7335-040-9
- Celokupna bibliografija: B. Telebaković-Pecarski, Zbornik filozofskog fakulteta u Beogradu, 1963 (Целокупна библиографија: Б. Телебаковић-Пецарски, Зборник филозофског факултета у Београду, 1963).

=== Awards ===
- SR Serbia: July 7 Award (1960)
- SFR Yugoslavia: Order of Labor with Red Banner (1961)
- SFR Yugoslavia: Medal for Merits for the People (1964)

== See also ==
- Edmond Paris
- Avro Manhattan
- Djoko Slijepčević
- Branko Bokun
- Philip Vincent

== Bibliography ==
- Radovan Samardžić: "Novak, Viktor", Enciklopedija Jugoslavije, 1. izdanje, Zagreb 1965.
- Vasilije Krestić: "Viktor Novak: Ecclesia militans ratuje s Tyrševom ideologijom i Libellus accusationis : dva izostavljena poglavlja iz knjige Magnum Crimen Viktora Novaka", Zbornik o Srbima u Hrvatskoj = Recueil des Travaux sur les Serbes en Croatie ISSN 0353-5967.- Br. 5 (2004), Belgrade 2004, pp. 7–80
