= Sociološki pregled =

Academic journal

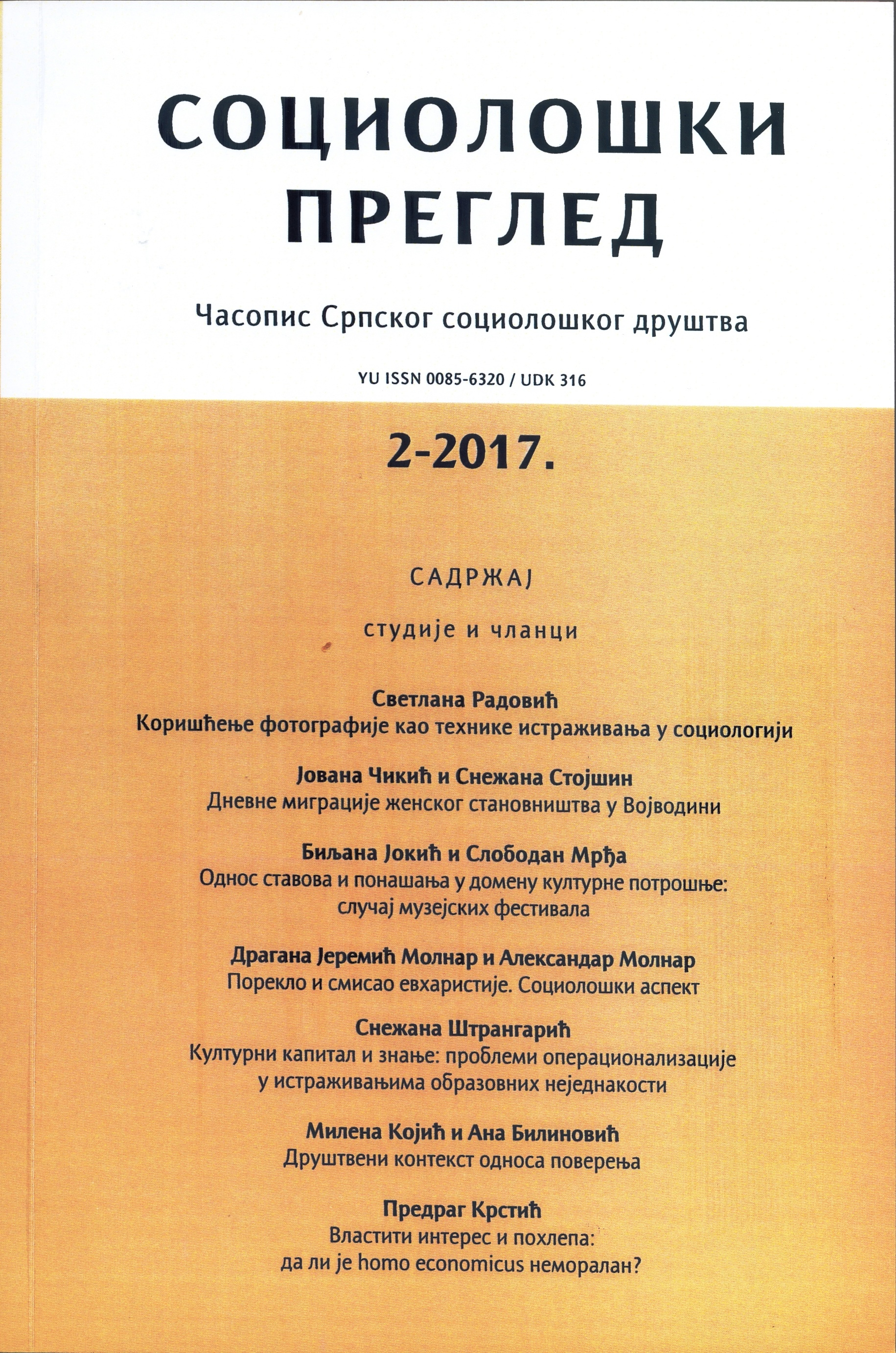
- Discipline: Sociology
- Language: Serbian & English
- Edited by: Snežana Stojšin

Publication details
- History: 1938/1961–present
- Publisher: Serbian Sociological Association (Serbia)
- Frequency: Quarterly
- Open access: Yes
- License: CC-BY-NC-ND

Standard abbreviations
- ISO 4: Sociol. Pregl.

Indexing
- ISSN: 0085-6320 (print); 2560-4880 (web)

Links
- Journal homepage

Sociološki pregled (Serbian Cyrillic: Социолошки преглед; transl. Sociological Review) is a quarterly peer-reviewed open access academic journal published by the Serbian Sociological Association since 1938 and regularly since 1961. Journal publishes theoretical, empirical, and methodological papers in the field of sociology, as well as multidisciplinary works in which sociology is one of the approaches. It is the oldest scientific journal in the field of sociology in the Balkans. The journal is published both in Serbian and English language. Initially printed in Latin script, since 1998 it has been printed in Serbian Cyrillic alphabet. The journal is indexed by the SCIndeks, CEEOL, ERIH PLUS, DOAJ, Sherpa/Romeo, ROAD (the Directory of Open Access Scholarly Resources), OpenAIRE, Crossref, EZB and ZDB. During the Yugoslav Wars and concurrent deep economic crysis in Serbia the journal received operational funding from the Open Society Foundations.

== History ==
Social Life, founded by Mirko Kosić in 1920, was Serbia's first sociological journal and it was modelled after the example of German journals. The journal was published until the following year when it was interrupted due to inadequate funding. In the 1930s, sociology gained recognition as an academic discipline in Serbia, primarily at the Faculty of Law in Belgrade. The new Sociološki Pregled aimed to follow French sociological traditions, publishing extensive, high-quality articles on various sociological topics fostering a multidisciplinary approach aimed to dispel romantic and nationalistic ideas. The journal was initially published by the Association for Sociology and Social Sciences in Belgrade.

World War II in Yugoslavia interrupted the journal's publication. In the 1950s, sociology re-emerged in Serbia, largely due to Radomir Lukić's efforts, who also contributed to the revival of Sociološki Pregled in 1961. Serbian Sociological Society revived the publication in 1961, initially as a collection, and since 1964, it has been published as a journal. In 1973, after one year interruption, double issue was published dealing with socialist self-management in Yugoslavia and Third World social trends. Since 1977, the co-publisher has been the Center for Sociological Research of the Institute of Social Sciences, while in 1983 the Sociological Association of SAP Vojvodina participated in the preparation of journal.

In 1992, during the Yugoslav Wars in Bosnia and Herzegovina and Croatia, the journal published a special issue on Sociology and War with contributions from Zagorka Golubović, Vesna Pešić, Žarana Papić and other prominent authors.

At the end of 2012 a three-volume proceedings special issue of the journal was published with 65 papers from 50 participantats of the 100 Years of Sociology in Serbia conference, held at Avala in early September 2012. 2017 decision to introduce 5,000.00 RSD (≈42 € at the time per InforEuro) article processing charge attracted wider public attention highlighting financial difficulties journals in Serbia are facing due to insufficient support from the Ministry of Science, Technological Development and Innovation. According to editor at the time, this fee does not in any way influence the selection outcome of the submitted works. In 2018 Egyptian-French Marxian economist Samir Amin published one of his last texts in this journal.
