= Philip Vincent =

Relatively little is known of the "P. Vincent" who published two works in London in 1637–38. However, he did give a genealogical account of his family up until 1630. Little is known about him after this date except that he was in America in 1637 at the time of the Pequot War. According to Charles Orr, this work was never printed, but he was able to take a look at it when writing his History of the Pequot War.

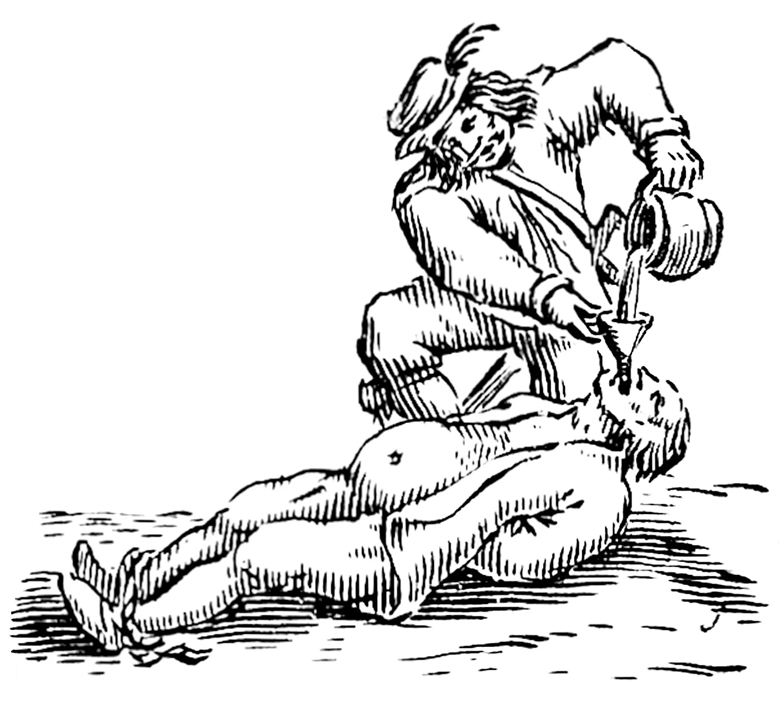
Schwedentrunk was a common method of torture during the Thirty Years' War. pisse poured down there throates, The mouthes of some have they opened with gags, and then poured downe their throats water, stinking puddle, filthy liquids, and pisse it selfe, saying: This is a Swedish draught. So growing sicke, and their bellies swelling like a Tun, they have died by leysure with the greater torment. - From The Lamentations of Germany by Philip Vincent, published 1638 in London

Vincent's family was from Yorkshire, descended from a John Vincent. Philip's father's name was Richard and his mother was Elizabeth, daughter of Thomas Rokeby, of another Yorkshire family. Philip also had two brothers, Thomas and William. Philip was christened on 23 November 1600 in Coningsborough. He was in Peter House in the University of Cambridge and became Master of the Arts there. He married Frances, daughter of Sir Heydon in Norfolk when he was about twenty-five and they had three children Francis, John and Henry. Francis and John died in infancy. Henry was born in London in December 1629. He was ordained in 1625 and given a rectory in Surrey, but resigned in August 1629. His wife died in November 1630.

Philip also stated that his mother, father, and aunt died within seven weeks of each other in 1617, but Orr suggests that the deaths may have been even closer together according to the Coningsborough Register. Which states that Elizabeth died 6 June, Richard 19 June and his sister Jane Vincent on 26 June, all in 1617.

The first work published was an account of the Mystic Massacre of the Pequot War. It is uncertain whether Vincent was present at the events in America he described or got his information from an informant. This work proved fairly popular and was reissued twice the following year. It is attributed to Vincent on the basis of the Latin poem "Ad Lectorem" ("To the Reader"), which is signed "P. Vincentius."

Another work bearing the signature "P. Vincent" was published around the same time: The lamentations of Germany, wherein, as in a glasse, we may behold her miserable condition, composed by Dr Vincent, Theo. (London, 1638). This is an extended and gruesome illustrated account of atrocities like the Schwedentrunk committed during the ongoing religious wars in Germany.

The author of these works may have been the Philip Vincent, baptized in 1600 at Conisbrough, Yorkshire, and educated at Peterhouse, Cambridge. This same Philip Vincent was censured and warned against practising medicine, 6 September 1639.
