= Croatian State Government =

Croatian State Government may refer to:

- Government of the Independent State of Croatia (1941-1945)
- Croatian Government, the government of the modern-day Republic of Croatia (1990-)
