= Trial of Mile Budak =

The Trial of Mile Budak was the one-day trial of Mile Budak and a number of other members of the government of the Independent State of Croatia for high treason and war crimes on 6 June 1945 in Zagreb. The trial was held by the Military Court of the 2nd Army of Yugoslavia. Seven of the accused were executed the following day, and another died in prison.

== Apprehension ==
Following the Independent State of Croatia evacuation to Austria, several of the accused were apprehended by the British in their occupation zone in Austria. They were subsequently held at the Spittal detainment camp. On 17 May the British sent Nikola Mandić, Julije Makanec and Pavao Canki from Spittal to a train headed to Zagreb. They were joined en route by Nikola Steinfel and Mile Budak.

== The Indicted ==
1. Mile Budak - Minister of Education (1941), Minister of Foreign Affairs (1943)
2. Pavao Canki - Minister of Justice and Religion (1943-1945)
3. Julije Makanec - Minister of Education (1943-1945)
4. Nikola Mandić - Prime Minister (1943-1945)
5. Ademaga Mešić - Doglavnik
6. Lavoslav Milić - General
7. Bruno Nardelli - Governor
8. Juraj Rukavina - Ustaša Colonel
9. Nikola Steinfel - Minister of the Armed Forces (1944-1945)
10. Ivan Vidnjević - President of "Mobile Kangaroo Court" (Note: In Croatian the court was called 'mobilni prijeki sud'. 'Prijeki sud' is court who judges quickly without respecting regular court procedure.)

== Sentences ==
=== Executed 7 June ===
1. Mile Budak
2. Pavao Canki
3. Julije Makanec
4. Nikola Mandić
5. Nikola Steinfel
6. Juraj Rukavina
7. Ivan Vidnjević

=== Life imprisonment ===
1. Ademaga Mešić (died at Stara Gradiška, 1945)

=== Twenty years imprisonment ===
1. Lavoslav Milić
2. Bruno Nardelli
