= Mile Budak =

Croatian politician (1889–1945)

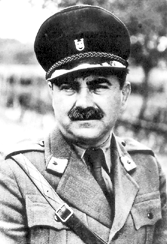
- Mile Budak

3rd Foreign Minister of the Independent State of Croatia
- In office 23 April 1943 – 5 November 1943
- Leader: Ante Pavelić
- Preceded by: Mladen Lorković
- Succeeded by: Stijepo Perić

Ambassador to Nazi Germany
- In office 2 November 1941 – 23 April 1943

1st Minister of Education of the Independent State of Croatia
- In office 16 April 1941 – 2 November 1941
- Leader: Ante Pavelić
- Preceded by: Office established
- Succeeded by: Stjepan Ratković

President of the Croatian State Leadership
- In office 12 April 1941 – 16 April 1941
- Preceded by: Office established
- Succeeded by: Office abolished

Personal details
- Born: 30 August 1889 Sveti Rok, Croatia-Slavonia, Austria-Hungary
- Died: 7 June 1945 (aged 55) Zagreb, SR Croatia, Democratic Federal Yugoslavia
- Cause of death: Execution by hanging
- Party: Ustaše
- Occupation: Politician; writer
- Profession: Lawyer

Mile Budak (30 August 1889 – 7 June 1945) was a Croatian politician and writer best known as one of the chief ideologists of the Croatian fascist Ustasha movement, which ruled the Independent State of Croatia (NDH) during World War II in Yugoslavia from 1941 to 1945 and waged a genocidal campaign of extermination against its Roma and Jewish population, and of extermination, expulsion and religious conversion against its Serb population. He was sentenced to death in 1945 by the post-war communist authorities in Yugoslavia for war crimes and crimes against humanity.

== Youth and early political activities ==
Mile Budak was born in Sveti Rok, in Lika, which was then a part of the Austro-Hungarian Empire. He attended school in Sarajevo and studied law at the University of Zagreb.

In 1912, he was arrested by Austro-Hungarian authorities over his alleged role in the attempted assassination of Slavko Cuvaj, the ban of Croatia.

== Kingdom of Yugoslavia ==
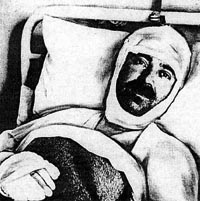
Budak after the assassination attempt, 1932

Budak and Vladko Maček served as lawyers representing Marko Hranilović and Matija Soldin at trial amid the 6 January Dictatorship. On 7 June 1932, he survived an assassination attempt by operatives close to the Kingdom of Yugoslavia. Afterwards, he migrated to Italy to join the Ustashas and become the commander of an Ustasha training camp.

Budak was known for his literary work, especially novels and plays in which he had glorified Croatian peasantry. His works included the 1938 Ognjište (The Hearth), the 1933 Opanci dida Vidurine (Grandpa Vidurina's Opanci), and the 1939 Rascvjetana trešnja (The Blossoming Cherry Tree). About Budak's writing, his contemporary Ernst Erich Noth wrote: "Here we find the stubborn, spiritual-realistic conception of man and his relation to the soil on which he lives and which Mile Budak symbolizes as 'the hearth'".

In 1938, he returned to Zagreb where he began publishing the weekly newspaper Hrvatski narod. The newspaper was vocal in its criticism of the Croatian Peasant Party (HSS) and opposed the Cvetković–Maček Agreement, by which the autonomous Banovina of Croatia was created. In 1940, the authorities of the Banovina of Croatia banned the newspaper and had Budak arrested, along with 50 other Ustaše members. They were first interned in the Lepoglava prison, and were later transferred to Kruščica near Travnik. On 31 March 1941, in a joint letter to Adolf Hitler, Ante Pavelić and Budak asked him "to help Croatian people establish an independent Croatian state that would encompass the old Croatian regions, among them Bosnia and Herzegovina".

== World War II ==
Upon the proclamation of the Independent State of Croatia (NDH) on 10 April 1941, Budak became the state's chief propagandist and Minister of Education and Faith. As such, he publicly stated that forcible expulsion and religious conversion of the ethnic Serb minority was the official national policy. Budak signed the Ustashe regime's racial laws against Serbs, Jews, and Roma. Croatian novelist Miroslav Krleža described Budak as "a minister of culture with a machine gun".

Budak pursued in his positions virulent anti-Serb agitation. Thus, he remarked on 6 June 1941 in Križevci:

"The Serbs came to our territories, because they were persecuted by the Turkish gangs, they came as plunderers and the filth from the Balkans. We can not allow our national state to be ruled by two nations. There is only one God, and there is only one nation, that is ruling: and this is the Croat nation. These ones, who arrived here 200, 300 years ago, might go back to whence they came. [...] One has to know, that we are a state that has two religions: the Catholic, and the Mohammedan."

According to an alleged statement, reportedly said by Budak, the Ustaše plan was to "kill one part of the Serbs, evacuate another and lead over one part to Catholicism and thus transform them into Croats." The origins of this statement are unclear. According to Veljko Bulajić, the statement originates from a speech in Gospić on 22 July 1941. Other authors claim that it came in a radio broadcast, while some attribute it to Dido Kvaternik. In a report to the Yugoslav government-in-exile, the statement was attributed to Andrija Artuković. There are various versions of the quote that differ in wording. The historian Tomislav Dulić said that he "tried to find a primary source that could confirm the existence and exact wording of this statement", but was "not been able to ascertain whether such a statement actually exists".

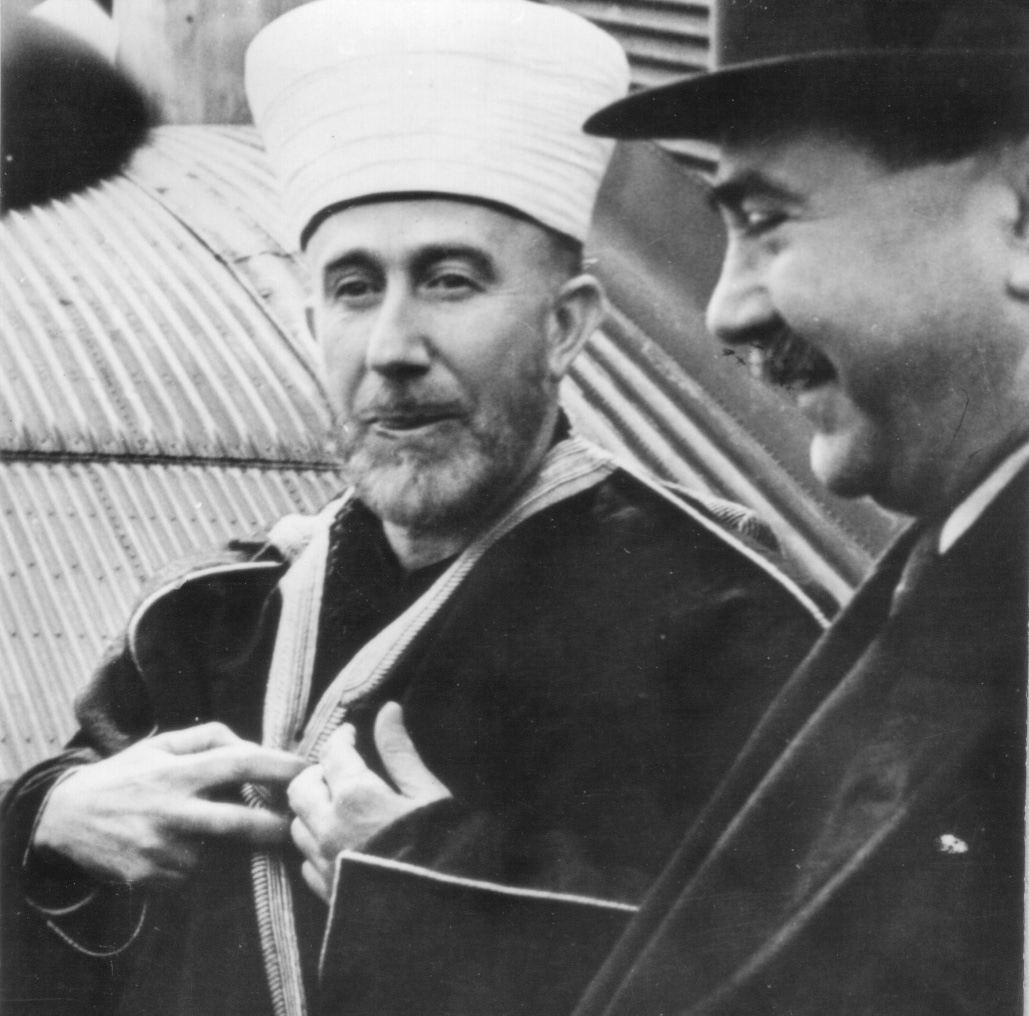
Nazi collaborator Haj Amin al-Husseini and Mile Budak meeting in occupied Sarajevo, 1943.

He later became a Croatian envoy to Nazi Germany (November 1941 – April 1943) and the Foreign Minister (May 1943 – November 1943). Following the Independent State of Croatia evacuation to Austria, Budak was captured by British military authorities and handed over to Josip Broz Tito's Partisans on 18 May 1945. He was court-martialled (before the military court of the 2nd Yugoslav army) in Zagreb on 6 June 1945 and was sentenced to death by hanging the same day. His execution the following day took place exactly 13 years after the assassination attempt on his life. During the trial, Budak was described to behave "cowardly, constantly weeping, and claiming he was not guilty of anything".

== Legacy ==
After the war, his books were banned by Yugoslav Communist authorities. Thus, many Croatian nationalists viewed Budak as a great figure of Croatian literature, equal, if not superior to the leftist Miroslav Krleža. Following Croatian independence in the early 1990s, the Croatian Democratic Union aimed to reinterpret the Ustasha as a Croatian patriotic force. In early 1993, the collected works of Mile Budak were republished, and Croatian writer Giancarlo Kravar at the time wrote: "... Ustashism, in its history, was undoubtly also a positive political movement for the state-building affirmation of Croatianism, the expression of the centuries-long aspiration of the Croatian people".

Elsewhere and more recently, Budak was described as "a mediocre Croatian author", "a mediocre writer at best", "a writer of middling originality and imagination" or a writer which literary work is "average and without lasting value".

Following Croatian independence, the Franjo Tuđman government renamed streets after Budak. As of August 2004, there were seventeen cities in Croatia which had streets named after Budak. In 2013, the Ministry of Public Administration announced plans to rename all those streets as they were unconstitutional. The Aleksa Šantić Street in Mostar, Bosnia and Herzegovina was named after Budak between 1995 and 2022. The Archdiocese of Zagreb declared at one point that it had no objection to the erection of a monument dedicated to the dead Ustaša leader.
