= Stijepo Perić =

Croatian lawyer, politician and diplomat

Knight Stjepan "Stijepo" Perić
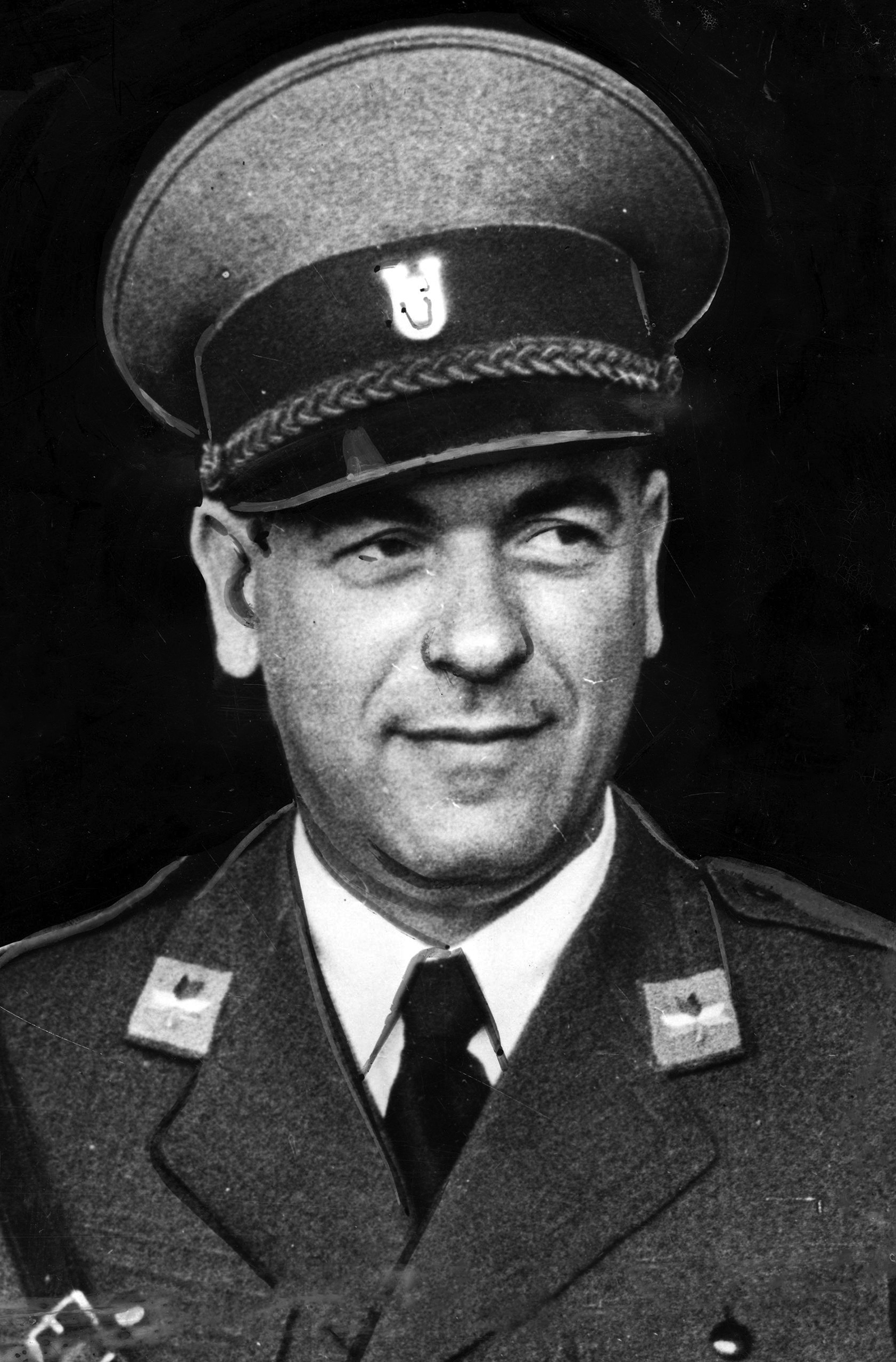

Foreign Minister of Croatia
- In office 5 November 1943 – 28 April 1944
- Prime Minister: Nikola Mandić
- Preceded by: Mile Budak
- Succeeded by: Mladen Lorković

Croatian ambassador to Bulgaria
- In office July 1943 – November 1943
- Preceded by: Vladimir Židovec
- Succeeded by: Đuro Jakčin

Croatian ambassador to Italy
- In office October 1941 – April 1943
- Preceded by: Office established
- Succeeded by: Ante Nikšić

Personal details
- Born: Stjepan Perić; 12 October 1896 Broce, Ston, Dalmatia, Austria-Hungary
- Died: 12 June 1954 (aged 57) Buenos Aires, Argentina
- Party: Ustaše
- Education: University of Zagreb
- Occupation: Diplomat, politician
- Profession: Lawyer

Stjepan "Stijepo" Perić (12 October 1896 – 12 June 1954) was a Croatian lawyer, politician, diplomat and member of the Croatian ultra-nationalist Ustaše. After the creation of the Independent State of Croatia in April 1941, he served as ambassador to Italy and to Bulgaria, and then as Foreign Minister. He was forced to resign from his ministerial post in April 1944 after a string of incidents in which his attitude and behavior irritated senior Axis leaders, including Adolf Hitler and Benito Mussolini.

== Early life ==
Stijepo Perić was born in Broce near Ston in 1896. After elementary school, he attended gymnasium in Dubrovnik, Kotor and Split. In 1922 he gained his doctorate of law from the University of Zagreb. He then ran a law office in Dubrovnik. He started to cooperate with Ante Pavelić in 1928 when both of them joined the list of Split-Dubrovnik County of Croatian Bloc during the 1928 elections. Perić became radicalized by the implementation of the 6 January Dictatorship of Alexander I of Yugoslavia. In January 1933 he emigrated from Yugoslavia, living in Germany, Belgium and Italy. In the same year he joined the Ustaše and become Pavelić's adjutant in Main Ustaše Headquarters. After the assassination of King Alexander in Marseille in 1934 he was detained for a short period. In 1937 he returned to Dalmatia where he was involved in organizing the Ustaše and kept in contact with Mile Budak.

== Diplomatic career ==
At the end of October 1941 he was named Ambassador to Italy. Before he was sent to Rome, Perić requested that he be appointed as Ambassador to Spain, but his request was refused. In late December 1942, Perić was directed to lodge a strong protest with the Chief of the Italian Supreme Command (Comando Supremo), Marshal Ugo Cavallero, regarding the Italians use of Chetnik auxiliaries in the areas of the NDH that were occupied by Italy. The protest was ineffective, as the Italians continued to arm and supply the Chetniks.

Perić was aware that the Italian forces supported the Chetniks on the Croatian territory to gain support against pro-German oriented Croats. He discussed the Chetnik issue with Italian Foreign Minister Galeazzo Ciano, who stated that he personally was opposed to the Italian Army's use of Chetnik auxiliaries but that only Benito Mussolini was able to do influence the Army to stop using the Chetniks. Ciano proposed a meeting between Pavelić and Mussolini to resolve the matter.

Perić was recalled from duty on 8 April 1943 because of his action against Italian Ambassador to Croatia, Raffaele Casertano. After that he was Ambassador to Bulgaria in Sofia from July until beginning of November 1943. Perić was named a Knight of the Independent State of Croatia.

From 5 November 1943 he was Foreign Minister. During his career as Foreign Minister, he was opponent of terror, supporter of the idea of cooperation with the Croatian Peasant Party and he advocated more independent foreign policy. During the meeting with Adolf Hitler in Schloss Klessheim near Salzburg, Hitler called him a "Levantine", while German Foreign Minister, Joachim von Ribbentrop stated that Perić was a person with whom they would have problems. Perić protested and demanded punishment for German soldiers who had robbed Ston during the November and December 1943.

In March 1944, members of the 7th SS Volunteer Mountain Division Prinz Eugen were involved in mass killings of civilians during operations around Sinj and Poljica in Dalmatia. After a complaint from Edo Bulat, the NDH Minister for Liberated Areas, Perić directed the NDH chargé d'affaires in Berlin, Tomislav Sambugnach to lodge a sharp note of protest with the German Foreign Ministry. The note demanded that criminal charges be made against the German troops involved in the killings, and that the Chetniks involved be handed over to the NDH authorities. The Germans refused to accept the note, and instead had a note of protest read to the NDH Prime Minister advising him that any future communications should reflect the relative positions of the NDH and the Greater German Reich.

When the NDH authorities arrested 70 Chetniks in connection with the killings, the Gestapo attempted to have them released, but broke off their attempt when they were threatened with machine guns. This incident was the last in a long list of incidents where Perić had irritated the Axis powers, and he was forced to resign on 28 April 1944. After his resignation he lived in Switzerland and Slovakia. At the end of April 1945 he went to Italy where he stayed in various Allied camps. He escaped one of the camps in 1947 and went to Argentina, where he died in Buenos Aires.
