= Government of the Independent State of Croatia =

1941–45 Axis-aligned WWII government

Croatian State Government Hrvatska državna vlada
- Government of Independent State of Croatia

- Flag of Ministers
- Date formed: 16 April 1941
- Date dissolved: 8 May 1945

People and organisations
- Head of state: Tomislav II (1941–1943); Ante Pavelić (1943–1945)
- Head of government: Ante Pavelić (1941–1943); Nikola Mandić (1943–1945)
- Member party: Ustaše
- Status in legislature: Totalitarian dictatorship

The Croatian State Government (Croatian: Hrvatska državna vlada) was the government of the Independent State of Croatia from 16 April 1941 until 8 May 1945. The political system included a head of state and head of government, under a variety of official titles, throughout its four-year period of existence.

On 11 April 1941, after the proclamation of the Independent State of Croatia, Slavko Kvaternik, Deputy Leader of the Ustaše issued an order in which all state questions would be dealt with by the Ban Government Department (Odjel Banske vlasti). One day later, he formed an interim government called the Croatian State Leadership (Croatian: Hrvatsko državno vodstvo). Kvaternik appointed the members of the Croatian State Leadership until Ante Pavelić formed the government. The chairman of the interim government was Mile Budak, other members were Mirko Puk (Deputy Leader), Andrija Artuković, Branko Benzon, Jozo Dumandžić, Mladen Lorković, Ismet Muftić, Marko Veršić, Đuro Vranešić and Milovan Žanić.

Ante Pavelić arrived in Zagreb on 15 April 1941. He formally established the government the following day by declaring the Provision for the Appointment of the Croatian State Government, which he signed as Poglavnik of the Independent State of Croatia. By this Provision, Pavelić inaugurated the official name of the state and his function in it. According to this provision, the State Government was the supreme state body that performed state administration. The State Government was responsible to the Poglavnik, who appointed members of the government, and he or the president or vice president led government sessions. State affairs were managed by the Government's Presidency or certain ministries.

After the war, Pavelić established the Croatian State Committee with Lovro Sušić, Mate Frković, and Božidar Kavran as its leaders. In 1951, Pavelić filled Croatian State Government since some of earlier government members were arrested and executed. His new government acted as the government in exile. Džafer-beg Kulenović was named Minister-President.

== Government composition ==
Portfolio	Minister	Took office	Left office
Minister-President	Ante Pavelić	27 June 1941	2 September 1943
Minister-President	Nikola Mandić (Note: Sentenced to death by communist authorities and executed after World War II)	2 September 1943	8 May 1945
Minister-Vice President	Osman Kulenović	16 April 1941	7 November 1941
Minister-Vice President	Džafer-beg Kulenović	7 November 1941	8 May 1945
Deputy Leader of Ustaše	Ljudevit Šolc	16 April 1941	30 April 1943
Deputy Leader of Ustaše	Lovro Sušić	30 April 1943	8 May 1945
Government Secretary	Mirko Puk	11 October 1942	11 October 1943
Government Secretary	Andrija Artuković (Note: Emigrated to the United States; extradited to Yugoslavia and convicted of war crimes, later died in Yugoslav custody)	11 October 1943	8 May 1945
Minister-President of the Legislative Committee	Milovan Žanić	16 April 1941	8 May 1945
Minister of Armed Forces	Slavko Kvaternik	10 April 1941	4 January 1943
Minister of Armed Forces	Ante Pavelić	4 January 1943	2 September 1943
Minister of Armed Forces	Miroslav Navratil	2 September 1943	29 January 1944
Minister of Armed Forces	Ante Vokić (Note: Executed by the Ustaše for involvement in the Lorković-Vokić plot)	29 January 1944	30 August 1944
Minister of Armed Forces	Nikola Steinfl	30 August 1944	8 May 1945
Foreign Minister	Ante Pavelić	16 April 1941	9 June 1941
Foreign Minister	Mladen Lorković	9 June 1941	23 April 1943
Foreign Minister	Mile Budak	23 April 1943	5 November 1943
Foreign Minister	Stijepo Perić	5 November 1943	28 April 1944
Foreign Minister	Mladen Lorković	28 April 1944	5 May 1944
Foreign Minister	Mehmed Alajbegović	5 May 1944	8 May 1945
Minister of Interior	Andrija Artuković	16 April 1941	10 October 1942
Minister of Interior	Ante Nikšić	10 October 1942	29 April 1943
Minister of Interior	Andrija Artuković	29 April 1943	11 October 1943
Minister of Interior	Mladen Lorković	11 October 1943	30 August 1944
Minister of Interior	Mato Frković	30 August 1944	8 May 1945
Minister of Justice and Religion	Mirko Puk	16 April 1941	10 October 1942
Minister of Justice and Religion	Andrija Artuković	10 October 1942	1 April 1943
Minister of Justice and Religion	Jozo Dumandžić	1 April 1943	25 August 1943
Minister of Justice and Religion	Pavao Canki	25 August 1943	8 May 1945
Minister of Education	Mile Budak	16 April 1941	2 November 1941
Minister of Education	Stjepan Ratković	2 November 1941	10 October 1942
Minister of Education	Mile Starčević	10 October 1942	11 October 1943
Minister of Education	Julije Makanec	11 October 1943	8 May 1945
Minister of Craftmanship and Trade	Marijan Šimić	16 April 1941	15 October 1941
Minister of Craftmanship and Trade	Dragutin Toth	15 October 1941	10 October 1942
Minister of Craftmanship and Trade	Josip Cabas	10 October 1942	1 February 1944
Minister of Craftmanship and Trade	Vjekoslav Vrančić	1 February 1944	8 May 1945
Minister of People's Economy	Lovro Sušić	16 April 1941	30 June 1941
Minister of People's Economy	Andrija Artuković	11 October 1942	11 October 1943
Minister of Rural Economy	Jozo Dumandžić	1 July 1941	10 October 1942
Minister of Rural Economy	Stjepan Hefer	11 October 1942	11 October 1943
Minister of State Treasury	Vladimir Košak	1 July 1941	1 April 1943
Minister of State Treasury	Ante Filipančić	1 April 1943	10 October 1943
Minister of State Treasury	Dragutin Toth	10 October 1943	8 May 1945
Minister of Traffic and Public Works	Hilmija Bešlagić	1 July 1941	11 October 1943
Minister of Traffic and Public Works	Ante Vokić	11 October 1943	30 August 1944
Minister of Traffic and Public Works	Jozo Dumandžić	30 August 1944	8 May 1945
Minister of Forestry and Mining	Ivica Frković	16 April 1941	10 October 1943
Minister of Forestry and Mining	Josip Balen	10 October 1943	8 May 1945
Minister of Delivery	Jozo Dumandžić	16 April 1941	1 July 1941
Minister of Delivery	Lovro Sušić	1 July 1941	10 October 1942
Minister of Health	Ivan Petrić	16 April 1941	10 October 1942
Minister of Health and Delivery	Janko Tortić	10 October 1942	8 May 1945
Minister of Welfare for Perished Lands	Mehmed Alajbegović	11 October 1943	5 May 1944
Minister of Welfare for Perished Lands	Meho Mehičić	5 May 1944	8 May 1944
Minister for Liberated Areas	Edo Bulat	11 October 1943	20 May 1944

== Government in exile ==
The government in exile was announced by Ante Pavelić on 10 April 1951. It dissolved following Pavelić's death on 28 December 1959.

Portfolio	Minister
Minister-President	Džafer-beg Kulenović
Minister-Vice President	Vjekoslav Vrančić
Minister of Interior	Andrija Artuković
Foreign Minister	Petar Pejačević
Minister of Education	Andrija Ilić
Minister of Armed Forces	Rafael Boban
Minister of Telecommunications and Post	Jozo Dumandžić
Minister of Forests and Mines	Ivica Frković
Minister without portfolio	Stjepan Hefer
Minister without portfolio	Hilmija Bešlagić
Minister without portfolio	Jozo Turina
