= Andrija Artuković =

Convicted World War II war criminal (1899-1988)

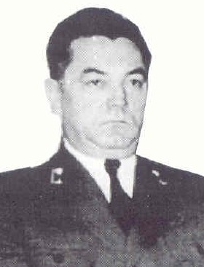
- Andrija Artuković, 1940s

1st Minister of Interior of the Independent State of Croatia
- In office 16 April 1941 – 10 October 1942
- Preceded by: Office established
- Succeeded by: Ante Nikšić

Minister of Justice of the Independent State of Croatia
- In office 10 October 1942 – 29 April 1943

3rd Minister of Interior of the Independent State of Croatia
- In office 29 April 1943 – 1 November 1943
- Leader: Ante Pavelić
- Preceded by: Ante Nikšić
- Succeeded by: Mladen Lorković

State Secretary
- In office 11 November 1943 – 8 May 1945
- Preceded by: Mirko Puk
- Succeeded by: Office abolished

Personal details
- Born: 19 November 1899 Ljubuški, Condominium of Bosnia and Herzegovina, Austria-Hungary
- Died: 16 January 1988 (aged 88) Zagreb, SR Croatia, SFR Yugoslavia
- Party: Ustaše
- Spouse: Ana Maria Heidler
- Education: University of Zagreb
- Profession: Lawyer

Andrija Artuković (19 November 1899 – 16 January 1988) was a Croatian lawyer, politician, and senior member of the fascist Ustaše movement, who served as the Minister of Internal Affairs and Minister of Justice in the Government of the Independent State of Croatia (NDH) during World War II in Yugoslavia. He signed into law several racial laws against Serbs, Jews, and Roma, and was responsible for a string of concentration camps where civilians were tortured and murdered. He escaped to the United States after the war, where he lived until he was extradited to Yugoslavia in 1986. He was tried and found guilty of several mass killings in the NDH and was sentenced to death, but the sentence was not carried out due to his age and health. He died in custody in 1988.

== Early life and career ==
Andrija Artuković was born on 19 November 1899, in Klobuk, near Ljubuški in Austro-Hungarian to Marijan and Ruža (née Rašić) Artuković. He was one of 14 siblings raised on a farm. He studied at a Franciscan gymnasium (high school) run by the friary in nearby Široki Brijeg, and obtained a doctorate in law from the University of Zagreb in 1924. From 1926 he was practising law in Gospić in the Lika region of the Kingdom of Yugoslavia.

== Ustaše activities ==
Artuković joined the Croatian nationalist and terrorist Ustaše organisation which had been formed in 1929 and 1932, he was one of the organisers of their small Velebit uprising in Lika, which involved an attack on a Yugoslav gendarmerie station by a group of Ustaše. Artuković fled Yugoslavia before the uprising commenced, escaping via Rijeka to Venice on 31 August. On arrival in Italy, the poglavnik (supreme leader) of the Ustaše, Ante Pavelić, appointed Artuković as an adjutant to Main Ustaša Headquarters and commander of all Ustaše in Italy, and Artuković adopted the pseudonym "Hadžija" (pilgrim). The uprising he helped organise was quickly and brutally suppressed by the Yugoslav authorities, which brought the Ustaše some public attention and prestige.

In Italy, Artuković came into conflict with a group of supporters of fellow Ustaša Mijo Babić (known as "Giovanni"). In late 1933, Artuković left the country. After that, he went to Budapest and then Vienna, where he was arrested and briefly detained in March 1934 before being expelled from Austria. He returned to Budapest, then after meeting Pavelić in Milan in early October, he travelled to London. He was arrested there after the Ustaše assassination of the Yugoslav King Alexander I in Marseille, France.

After his arrest, he was handed over to French authorities and spent three months in a Paris prison. In January 1935, he was extradited to Yugoslavia, and after 16 months spent in prison in Belgrade, he was acquitted by the Court for the Protection of the State. He was released on 16 April 1936 and briefly returned to Gospić before travelling to Austria in May. He later went to Germany, where he spread Ustaše propaganda. In early 1937, he was living in Berlin when he was interrogated by the Gestapo, and under threat of arrest, he fled to France. This was followed by a stint in Budapest, after which he returned to Berlin. By the late 1930s, the Ustaše had adopted the fascist principles of their financial backer and protector, Italy.

== Independent State of Croatia ==
In late March 1941, Yugoslavia joined the Axis. Still, two days later, a pro-Allied coup d'état overthrew the government that had signed the treaty. In response, Adolf Hitler decided to invade and dismember Yugoslavia. The German-led Axis invasion of Yugoslavia in early April comprehensively defeated the Yugoslav military, and the country was divided up between the Axis powers. Before the Yugoslav government had capitulated, the Germans engineered the creation of the Independent State of Croatia, and placed Pavelić and the Ustaše in charge.

Slavko Kvaternik, the most senior Ustaše still in Yugoslavia, proclaimed the Independent State of Croatia on 10 April 1941, and Artuković and the other émigré Ustaše returned to Zagreb. On 12 April, Kvaternik formed an interim government, which included Artuković. Pavelić arrived in Zagreb on 15 April, and on the following day, Artuković became the Interior Minister in the first Croatian government. As a member of Pavelić's trusted inner circle, Artuković carried out the orders he was given.

On 17 April, to provide authority for Ustaše policies targeting Serbs, Jews, Roma, and anti-Ustaše Croats within the NDH, Pavelić proclaimed the Law Decree on the Defence of the People and the State. It prohibited any person from acting against the Croatian people and their interests, for which the penalty was death. Such alleged offences were to be dealt with in a summary manner by a panel similar to a court martial. On 22 April, Artuković announced that the NDH government would solve the "Jewish question" in the same way as the German government, and a week later, he issued further racial laws, and advocated a policy of terror. These first and subsequent racial laws were vaguely worded, permitting broad interpretation. The organisation charged with enforcing these laws was the Directorate of Public Order and Security, which was subordinated to Artuković's Interior Ministry. The Directorate was established in May and was headed by Eugen "Dido" Kvaternik, the son of Slavko Kvaternik.

In the meantime, Artuković participated in the Croatian-Italian border negotiations that took place between Pavelić and the Italian Foreign Minister Count Galeazzo Ciano in Italian-annexed Ljubljana on 25 April 1941. The Italians claimed the entire eastern shore of the Adriatic. Still, Pavelić made a counter-offer of that part of Dalmatia that had been offered to Italy in the secret Treaty of London of 1915. The earlier Pavelić-Ciano agreement became the basis for the Treaties of Rome, which ceded these areas to Italy, and Artuković also accompanied Pavelić to the signing of those treaties in mid-May.

On 6 June, Artuković accompanied Pavelić during his visit to Adolf Hitler. On 24 February 1942, at the opening of the Croatian Parliament (Croatian: Sabor), Artuković announced the creation of the Croatian Orthodox Church, which was intended to replace the Serbian Orthodox Church for Serbs living within the NDH. During the same speech, he promised that the NDH would take more radical action against Jews than Nazi Germany, referring to the Jewish people of the NDH as "insatiable and poisonous parasites" who would be destroyed, and stating that Croats had been forced to serve the Jews in pursuit of their "filthy" profits and "materialistic and grasping" ambitions. This speech preceded a systematic campaign against Croatian Jews which included mass deportations to NDH concentration camps and German extermination camps. After the government reshuffle on 10 October 1942, Artuković became Minister of Justice and Religion, then from 29 April 1943 until 1 October 1943 he was again the Minister of Interior. He was Secretary of State from 11 October 1943 until the collapse of the Independent State of Croatia on 8 May 1945.

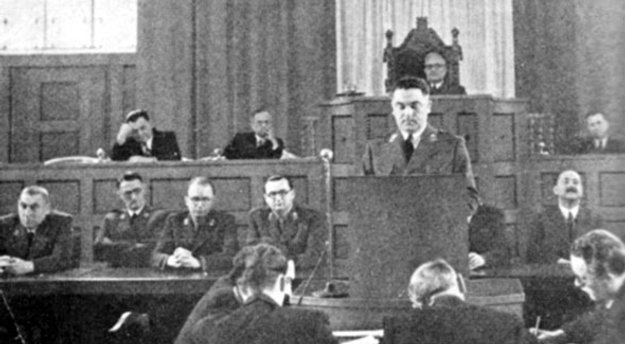
Andrija Artuković delivering a speech in the Sabor in 1942

== Emigration, repatriation, and trials ==
With other members of the Government, he left Zagreb on 6 May 1945 in the Independent State of Croatia evacuation to Austria. He was detained in an Allied camp in Spittal an der Drau. On 18 May 1945, the British extradited some Croatian ministers and Prime Minister Nikola Mandić to the Yugoslav authorities. Artuković was not extradited, but he was released soon with the remaining ministers. He left the British occupational zone and then went via the American to the French occupational zone, where his family was. In November 1946, he crossed the Austria–Switzerland border. He declared a false name, Alois Anich, and a false visa in Switzerland. In February 1947, he asked Swiss authorities for a Nansen passport. Some months later, they found out his real identity. Switzerland offered him the chance to keep his Nansen passport, provided that he and his family would leave Switzerland until 15 July 1947. Exactly at that date, they took a plane to Ireland. About one year later, they entered the United States on a tourist visa and settled in Seal Beach, California. He worked at a company owned by his brother. As an accused war criminal, Romani Holocaust perpetrator and Ustaše official, he did not qualify for legal status in the United States. He remained in the country after overstaying his visa.

In July 1945, the Yugoslav State Commission for Investigation of Crimes of Occupiers and Their Allies declared Artuković a war criminal. The Government of the FPR Yugoslavia requested his extradition on 29 August 1951. Their request met with a seven-year-long bureaucratic delay in Los Angeles, California due to the influence of the Croatian émigré community and the Roman Catholic Archdiocese of Los Angeles, to whom Artuković and his family had appealed. On 15 January 1959, U.S. Commissioner Theodore Hocke rejected Yugoslavia's extradition request; the INS's grounds for refusing extradition was "...since the crimes for which extradition was requested were deemed 'political' by the court, if Artukovic were deported to Yugoslavia, he would be "subject to physical persecution". When the United States Immigration and Naturalization Service (INS) raised the question of the legal basis of the stay in the US of a large number of associates of and/or collaborationists with Nazi Germany, the Yugoslav authorities, under the initiative of the Special Investigation Court of the U.S. Department of Justice, renewed their request for Artuković's extradition. He was arrested on 14 November 1984, and a court process began in New York. Artuković remained in custody until his deportation. In 1985, he was transferred to the United States Medical Center for Federal Prisoners in Springfield, Missouri due to his health problems.

Artuković was prosecuted by the Office of Special Investigations of the U.S. Department of Justice as the "Butcher of the Balkans". He was ordered extradited to Yugoslavia on 11 November 1986, where he was tried in the Zagreb District Court. He was found guilty of:

- ordering the deaths of a lawyer and former member of the Yugoslav National Assembly, Dr. Ješa Vidić, in early 1941;
- ordering the deaths by machine-gun fire of 450 men, women and children in late 1941 because there was no room for them in a concentration camp;
- ordering the killing of the entire population of the town of Vrginmost and its surrounding villages in 1942; and
- ordering the execution of "several hundred" prisoners at Samobor Castle near Zagreb in 1943 by having them driven into an open field, where they were machine-gunned and then crushed by tanks.

The court held that Artuković's intent had originated with "his Ustaša orientation, by which persecutions, concentration camps and mass killings of Serbs, Jews, Gypsies, as well as Croats who did not accept the ideology, were part of the implementation of a program of creating a 'pure' Croatia". In sentencing him to death, the court described him as one of the "ruthless murderers, who under the cover of 'protecting purity of race and faith' and to realise their Nazi-Fascist ideology, [... ] killed, slaughtered, tortured, crippled, exposed to great suffering, and persecuted thousands and thousands of people, among whom were women and children." He was sentenced to death, but the sentence was not carried out due to his age and poor health.

== Death ==
Artuković died of natural causes in the prison hospital in Zagreb on 16 January 1988. His son, Radoslav (a California native), requested information about his father's burial from the Yugoslav authorities. A special law was passed in Yugoslavia that the remains of those convicted and sentenced to death but who escaped execution, were to be disposed of as those of executed persons. It is unclear what happened to his remains. In 2010—also at Radoslav's request—the president of the Croatian Helsinki Committee, Ivan Zvonimir Čičak, called for authorities to investigate what happened to the remains.
