= Ante Pavelić =

Dictator of the Independent State of Croatia from 1941 to 1945

Poglavnik Ante Pavelić
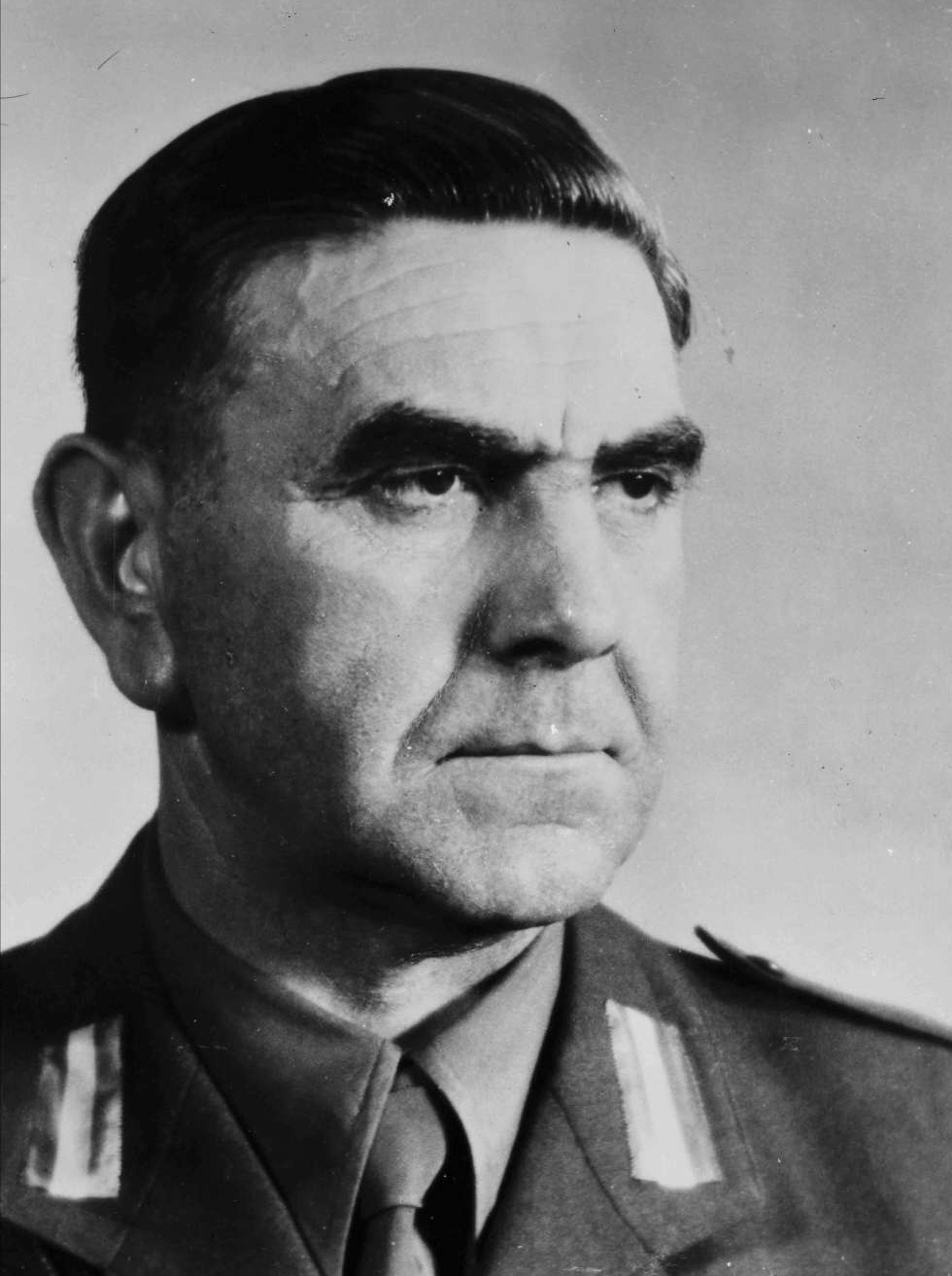
- Pavelić in 1942

Poglavnik of the Independent State of Croatia
- In office 10 April 1941 – 8 May 1945
- Monarch: Tomislav II (1941–1943)
- Prime Minister: Himself (1941–1943); Nikola Mandić (1943–1945)
- Preceded by: Position established
- Succeeded by: Position abolished

1st Prime Minister of the Independent State of Croatia
- In office 16 April 1941 – 2 September 1943
- Monarch: Tomislav II
- Preceded by: Position established
- Succeeded by: Nikola Mandić

2nd Minister of Armed Forces of the Independent State of Croatia
- In office 4 January 1943 – 2 September 1943
- Prime Minister: Himself
- Preceded by: Slavko Kvaternik
- Succeeded by: Miroslav Navratil

1st Foreign Minister of the Independent State of Croatia
- In office 16 April 1941 – 9 June 1941
- Monarch: Tomislav II
- Prime Minister: Himself
- Preceded by: Position established
- Succeeded by: Mladen Lorković

Member of the Yugoslav Parliament
- In office 11 September 1927 – 7 January 1929
- Monarch: Alexander I
- Prime Minister: Velimir Vukićević (1927–1928); Anton Korošec (1928–1929)
- Constituency: Zagreb

Personal details
- Born: 14 July 1889 Bradina, Bosnia and Herzegovina, Austria-Hungary
- Died: 28 December 1959 (aged 70) Madrid, Spain
- Cause of death: Complications from gunshot wounds
- Resting place: Saint Isidore Cemetery, Madrid
- Party: Ustaše (1929–1945)
- Other political affiliations: Croatian Party of Rights (1910–1929); Croatian Statehood Party (1950); Croatian Liberation Movement (1956–1959)
- Education: University of Zagreb
- Occupation: Politician
- Profession: Lawyer

Ante Pavelić (Croatian: [ǎːnte pǎʋelit͡ɕ]; 14 July 1889 – 28 December 1959) was a Croatian politician who founded and headed the Ustaše in 1929 and was dictator of the Independent State of Croatia (NDH), a fascist puppet state built out of parts of occupied Yugoslavia by the authorities of Nazi Germany and Fascist Italy, from 1941 to 1945. Pavelić and the Ustaše persecuted many racial minorities and political opponents in the NDH during the war, including Serbs, Jews, Romani, and Yugoslav Partisans, becoming one of the key figures of the genocide of Serbs, the Porajmos and the Holocaust in the NDH.

At the start of his career, Pavelić was a lawyer and a politician of the Croatian Party of Rights in the Kingdom of Yugoslavia known for his nationalist beliefs and support for an independent Croatia. By the end of the 1920s, his political activity became more radical as he called on Croats to revolt against Yugoslavia, and schemed an Italian protectorate of Croatia separate from Yugoslavia. After King Alexander I declared his 6 January Dictatorship in 1929 and banned all political parties, Pavelić went abroad and plotted with the Internal Macedonian Revolutionary Organization (IMRO) to undermine the Yugoslav state, which prompted the Yugoslav authorities to try him in absentia and sentence him to death. In the meantime, Pavelić had moved to Fascist Italy where he founded the Ustaše, a Croatian nationalist movement with the goal of creating an independent Croatia by any means, including the use of terror. Pavelić incorporated terrorist actions in the Ustaše program, such as train bombings and assassinations, staged a small uprising in Lika in 1932, culminating in the assassination of King Alexander in 1934 in conjunction with the IMRO. Pavelić was once again sentenced to death after being tried in France in absentia and, under international pressure, the Italians imprisoned him for 18 months, and largely obstructed the Ustaše in the following period.

At the behest of the Germans, senior Ustaša Slavko Kvaternik declared the NDH's establishment on 10 April 1941 in the name of Pavelić. Calling himself the Poglavnik, or supreme leader, Pavelić returned from Italy and took control of the puppet government. He created a political system similar to that of Fascist Italy and Nazi Germany. The NDH, though constituting a Greater Croatia, was forced by the Italians to relinquish several territorial concessions to the latter. After taking control, Pavelić imposed largely anti-Serbian, anti-Semitic and anti-Roma policies that resulted in the deaths of hundreds of thousands of Serbs, and tens of thousands of Jews and Roma in the NDH, many of which in dedicated concentration and extermination camps run by the Ustaše. Under the NDH regime, hundreds of thousands of Orthodox Christians were also forcibly converted to Catholicism, or expelled to German-occupied Serbia. These mass killings and persecutions have been described as the "single most disastrous episode in Yugoslav history".

In 1945, Pavelić ordered the executions of prominent NDH politicians Mladen Lorković and Ante Vokić on charges of treason when they were arrested for plotting to oust him and align the NDH with the Allies. Following the surrender of Germany that May, Pavelić ordered his troops to keep fighting even after the surrender. He subsequently ordered the NDH to flee to Austria to offer the surrender of their armed forces to the advancing British Army, which refused to accept it, and directed them to surrender to the Yugoslav Partisans instead. Sparked by attacks on their position, the Partisans began carrying out mass killings of surrendered Axis forces and their alleged collaborators, in which tens of thousands perished.

Pavelić fled to Austria before obtaining a false passport from the Vatican and escaping to Argentina, where he continued to engage in fascist activities. He later served as a security advisor to Juan Perón, the President of Argentina, who provided sanctuary for many fascist war criminals. On 10 April 1957, Pavelić was shot in an assassination attempt in Buenos Aires. The shooting and subsequent hospitalization caused him unwelcome public attention; fearing arrest and extradition to Yugoslavia, he fled to Francoist Spain, where he would be granted political asylum. He spent two and a half years in Spain before dying in Madrid from complications of the gunshot wounds on 28 December 1959, aged 70.

== Early life ==
=== Birth and education ===
Ante Pavelić was born in the Herzegovinian village of Bradina on the slopes of Ivan Mountain north of Konjic, roughly 15 kilometres (9.3 miles) southwest of Hadžići, then part of the Ottoman Empire occupied by the Austro-Hungarian Empire. His parents had moved to Bosnia and Herzegovina from the village of Krivi Put in the central part of the Velebit plain, in southern Lika (in today's Croatia), to work on the Sarajevo-Metković railway line.

Searching for work, his family moved to the village of Jezero outside Jajce, where Pavelić attended primary school, or maktab. Here Pavelić learned Muslim traditions and lessons that influenced his attitude towards Bosnia and its Muslims. Pavelić's sense of Croat nationalism grew from a visit to Lika with his parents, where he heard townspeople speaking Croatian, and realised it was not just the language of peasants. While attending school in Travnik he became an adherent of the nationalist ideologies of Ante Starčević and his successor as the leader of the Party of Rights, Josip Frank.

Health problems briefly interrupted his education in 1905. In summer he found work on the railway in Sarajevo and Višegrad. He continued his education in Zagreb, the home city of his elder brother Josip. In Zagreb, Pavelić attended high school. His failure to complete his fourth-year classes meant he had to retake the exam. Early in his high school days, he joined the Croatian Party of Rights as well as the Frankovci students' organization, founded by Josip Frank, the father-in-law of Slavko Kvaternik, an Austro-Hungarian colonel. Later he attended high school in Senj at the classical gymnasium, where he completed his fifth-year classes. Health problems again interrupted his education, and he took a job on the road in Istria, near Buzet. In 1909 he finished his sixth-year classes in Karlovac. His seventh-year classes were completed in Senj. Pavelić graduated in Zagreb in 1910 and entered the Law Faculty of the University of Zagreb. In 1912 Pavelić was arrested on suspicion of involvement in the attempted assassination of the Ban of Croatia-Slavonia, Slavko Cuvaj. He completed his law degree in 1914 and obtained his doctorate in July 1915. From 1915 until 1918 he worked as a clerk in the office of Aleksandar Horvat, president of the Party of Rights. After completing his clerkship, he became a lawyer in Zagreb.

=== Political rise ===
During World War I, Pavelić played an active role in the Croatian Party of Rights. As an employee and friend of its leader Horvat, he often attended important party meetings, taking over Horvat's duties when he was absent. In 1918, Pavelić entered the party leadership and its Business Committee. After the unification of the State of Slovenes, Croats and Serbs with the Kingdom of Serbia on 1 December 1918, the Party of Rights held a day of public protest claiming that the Croatian people were against having a Serbian king, and that their highest state authorities had not agreed to unification. Further, the party expressed their wish for a Croatian republic in a program from March 1919, signed by president of the party, Vladimir Prebeg and Pavelić. At the 1921 local elections in Zagreb, Pavelić was elected member of the city assembly. In the name of the party, he contacted Nikola Pašić, the Yugoslav Prime Minister and member of the People's Radical Party, with the goal of weakening the Croatian Peasant Party (HSS), the dominant Croatian party in the interwar period.

Pavelić was a member of the Frankovci faction of the Party of Rights. Ivica Peršić, a Croatian politician from the competing Milinovci faction, wrote in his memoir how Pavelić's 1921 election significantly raised the standing of his law office in Zagreb – a number of rich Jewish clients paid him to obtain Yugoslav citizenship, and Pavelić subsequently started to make frequent visits to Belgrade, where he would procure those documents through his increasing number of connections to the members of the ruling People's Radical Party.

In 1921, 14 Party of Rights members, including Pavelić, Ivo Pilar and Milan Šufflay, were arrested for anti-Yugoslav activities, for their alleged contacts with the Croatian Committee, a Croatian nationalist organization that was based in Hungary at the time. Pavelić acted as the defence lawyer at the subsequent trial and was released.

On 12 August 1922, in St. Mark's Church, Zagreb, Pavelić married Maria Lovrenčević. They had three children, daughters Višnja and Mirjana and son Velimir.

Later Pavelić became vice-president of the Croatian Bar Association, the professional body representing Croatian lawyers.

In his speeches to the Yugoslav Parliament he opposed Serbian nationalism and spoke in favor of Croatian independence. He was active with the youth of the Croatian Party of Rights and began contributing to the Starčević and Kvaternik newspapers.

Serbian members of the Yugoslav Parliament disliked him and when a Serbian member said "Good night" to him in parliament, Pavelić responded:

Gentleman, I will be euphoric when I will be able to say to you "good night". I will be happy when all Croats can say "good night" and thank you, for this "party" we had here with you. I think that you will all be happy when you don't have Croats here any more.

In 1927, Pavelić became the vice president of the party.

In June 1927, Pavelić represented Zagreb County at the European Congress of Cities in Paris. When he was returning from Paris, he visited Rome and submitted a memorandum in the name of HSP to the Italian ministry of foreign affairs in which he offered to cooperate with Italy in dismembering Yugoslavia. In order to obtain Italian support for Croatian independence, the memorandum effectively made any such Croatia 'little more than an Italian protectorate'. The memorandum also stated that the Party of Rights recognised the existing territorial settlements between Italy and Yugoslavia, thus giving up all Croatian claims to Istria, Rijeka, Zadar and the Adriatic islands which Italy had annexed after World War I. These areas contained between 300,000 and 400,000 Croats. Further, the memorandum also agreed to cede the Bay of Kotor and Dalmatian headlands of strategic importance to Italy, and agreed that a future Croatia would not establish a navy.

As the most radical politician of the Croatian Bloc, Pavelić sought opportunities to internationalize the "Croatian question" and highlight Yugoslavia's unsustainability. In December 1927, Pavelić defended four Macedonian students in Skopje who were accused of belonging to the Macedonian Youth Secret Revolutionary Organization founded by Ivan Mihailov. During the trial, Pavelić accused the court of setting them up and stressed the right to self-determination. This trial received public attention in Bulgaria and Yugoslavia.

Following his election as a member of the Croatian Bloc in the 1927 election, Pavelić became his party's liaison with Nikola Pašić. He was one of two elected Croatian Bloc candidates alongside Ante Trumbić, one of the key politicians in the creation of a Yugoslav state. From 1927 until 1929, he was part of the minuscule delegation of the Party of Rights in the Yugoslav Parliament.

In 1927, he secretly contacted the fascist dictator of Italy, Benito Mussolini, and presented his separatist ideas to him. Pavelić proposed an independent Greater Croatia that should cover the entire historical and ethnic area of the Croats. In mid-1928, the leaders of the Croatian Bloc, Trumbić and Pavelić, addressed the Italian consul in Zagreb to gain support for the Croatian struggle against regime of King Alexander. On 14 July, they received a positive response, after which Pavelić maintained contact.

Historian Rory Yeomans claimed that there are indications that Pavelić had been considering the formation of some kind of nationalist insurgency group as early as 1928. After the assassination of Croatian politicians in the National Assembly, of which he was an eyewitness, Pavelić joined the Peasant-Democratic Coalition and started to publish a magazine called Hrvatski domobran in which he advocated Croatian independence. His political party radicalised after the assassination. He found support in the Croatian Rights Republican Youth (Hrvatska pravaška republikanska omladina), a youth wing of the Party of Rights led by Branimir Jelić. On 1 October 1928 he founded an armed group with the same name, an act through which he openly called on Croatians to revolt. This group trained as part of a legal sport society. Yugoslav authorities declared the organization illegal and banned its activities.

== In exile ==
Pavelić held the position of the Party of Rights secretary until 1929, the beginning of the 6 January Dictatorship in the Kingdom of Yugoslavia. According to Croatian historian Hrvoje Matković, after the King declared his dictatorship Pavelić's house was under constant police watch.

At this time, Pavelić started to organize the Ustaša (Ustaša – Hrvatski revolucionarni pokret) as an organization with military and conspiratorial principles. Its official foundation date was 7 January 1929. The Ustaša movement was "founded on the principles of racialism and intolerance".

Because of the threat of arrest, Pavelić escaped during a surveillance lapse and went to Austria on the night of 19/20 January 1929. According to Tomasevich, Pavelić left for Vienna to "seek medical aid".

=== Initial exile and trial ===
He contacted other Croatian emigrants, mainly political émigrés, former Austrian-Hungarian officers, who gathered around Stjepan Sarkotić and refused to return to Yugoslavia. After a short stay in Austria, alongside Gustav Perčec, Pavelić moved to Budapest.

In March 1929, the Ustaše commenced a campaign of terrorism within Yugoslavia with the assassination of Toni Schlegel in Zagreb. Schlegel was a pro-Yugoslav editor of the newspaper Novosti who was also a close confidante of King Alexander.

After establishing contact with the Internal Macedonian Revolutionary Organization in April 1929, he and Perčec went to Sofia in Bulgaria. On 29 April 1929, Pavelić and Ivan Mihailov signed the Sofia Declaration in which they formalized cooperation between their movements. In the declaration, they obligated themselves to separate Croatia and Macedonia from Yugoslavia. Yugoslavia protested to Bulgaria. Pavelić was found guilty of high treason and sentenced to death in absentia along with Perčec on 17 August 1929.

Because of the Yugoslav verdict, on 25 September 1929 Pavelić was arrested in Vienna and expelled to Germany. Pavelić's stay in Germany was constrained by opposition from the German ambassador to Yugoslavia, Adolf Köster, a supporter of Yugoslavia. A friend of King Alexander, he did his best to prevent Croatian nationalist activity in Yugoslavia.

=== Exile in Italy ===
Pavelić left Germany under a false passport and went to Italy, where his family already lived. In Italy he frequently changed location and lived under false names, most often as "Antonio Serdar". Since he had been in contact with Italian authorities since 1927, he easily established contact with the fascists. In autumn 1929 he established contacts with Italian journalists and Mussolini's brother Arnaldo, who supported Croatian independence without any territorial concession. Pavelić created sympathy and understanding of Croats among Italians.

That autumn Pavelić published a brochure called Establishment of the Croatian State: Lasting Peace in the Balkans which summarized important events of Croatian history. The Italian authorities did not want to formally support Ustaše or Pavelić, to protect their reputation; nevertheless, the group received support from Mussolini, who saw them as a means to help destroy Yugoslavia and expand Italian influence in the Adriatic. Mussolini allowed Pavelić to live in exile in Rome and train his paramilitaries for war with Yugoslavia. In the Ustaša organization of 1929–1930, Pavelić's closest associates were Gustav Perčec, Branimir Jelić, Ivan Perčević and later Mladen Lorković and Mile Budak.

The Ustaše began with the creation of military formations trained for sabotage and terrorism. With financial help from Mussolini, in 1931 Pavelić established terrorist training camps, first in Bovegno in the Brescia region, and encouraged the foundation of such camps all around Italy. Camps were founded in Borgotaro, Lepari and Janka-Puszta in Hungary. The Ustaše were involved with smuggling weapons and propaganda into Yugoslavia from their camps in Italy and Hungary. At the demands of Italian authorities, the camps were often moved. The main Ustaše headquarters was at first in Torino, and later in Bologna.

On Pavelić's initiative, his associates established Ustaše associations in Belgium, Netherlands, France, Germany, Argentina, Uruguay, Bolivia, Brazil and North America. Pavelić also encouraged publishing magazines in various countries.

The series of bombings and shootings by the Ustaše in Yugoslavia resulted in a severe crackdown on political activity as the state met terror with terror. Impoverished Croat peasants were hardest hit by the counter-terror, usually meted out by Serb policemen.

In 1932 he started a newspaper named the "Ustaša – –Herald of Croatian Revolutionaries" (Croatian: Ustaša – vijesnik hrvatskih revolucionaraca). From its very first publication, Pavelić announced that the use of violence was central to the Ustaše: ‘

"The dagger, revolver, machine-gun and time bomb; these are the bells that will announce the dawn and the resurrection of the Independent State of Croatia."’

According to Ivo Goldstein, there were no instances of antisemitism in the newspaper in the beginning. Goldstein suggests there were three reasons for this; the total focus of the Ustaše on the Belgrade government, lack of the necessary intellectual capacity within the early Ustaše movement to properly develop their ideology, and the active involvement of Jews with the Ustaše. Goldstein points out that as Ustaše ideology developed in later years it became more anti-Semitic.

At a meeting held in Spittal in Austria in 1932, Pavelić, Perčec and Vjekoslav Servatzy decided to start a small uprising. It began at midnight on 6 September 1932 and was known as the Velebit uprising. Led by Andrija Artuković, the insurgency involved around 20 Ustaše members armed with Italian equipment. They attacked a police station and half an hour later pulled back to Velebit with no casualties. This uprising was to scare Yugoslav authorities. Despite the small scale the Yugoslav authorities were unnerved because the power of the Ustaše had been unknown. As a result, major security measures were introduced. This action appeared in the foreign press, especially in Italy and Hungary.

On 1 June 1933 and 16 April 1941, the Ustaša program and "The Seventeen Principles of the Ustaše Movement" were published in Zagreb by the Propaganda Department of the Supreme Ustaša Headquarters. The main goal was the creation of an independent Croatian state based on its historical and ethnic areas, with Pavelić stating that Ustaše must pursue this end by any means necessary, even by force of arms. According to his rules he would organize actions, assassinations and diversions. With this document the organization changed its name from Ustaša – Croatian Revolutionary Movement to Ustaša – Croatian Revolutionary Organization (Croatian: Ustaša – Hrvatska revolucionarna organizacija; abbreviated to UHRO).

=== Assassination of King Alexander and aftermath ===
By killing the king of Yugoslavia, Pavelić saw an opportunity to cause riots in Yugoslavia and eventual collapse of the state. In December 1933, Pavelić ordered the assassination of King Alexander. The assassin was caught by the police and the assassination attempt failed. However, Pavelić tried again in October 1934 in Marseille.

On 9 October 1934, King Alexander I of Yugoslavia and French foreign minister Louis Barthou were assassinated in Marseille. The perpetrator Vlado Chernozemski, a Bulgarian revolutionary, was killed right after the assassination by French police. Three Ustaša members, who had been waiting at different locations for the king, were captured and sentenced to life imprisonment by a French court. Pavelić along with Eugen Kvaternik and Ivan Perčević were subsequently sentenced to death in absentia by a French court. That the security was lax even though one attempt had already been made on Alexander's life testified to Pavelić's organizational abilities; he had apparently been able to bribe a high official in the Sûreté General. The Marseilles Prefect of Police, Jouhannaud, was subsequently removed from office. The Ustaša believed that the assassination of King Alexander had effectively "broken the backbone of Yugoslavia" and that it was their "most important achievement."

Under pressure from France, the Italian police arrested Pavelić and several Ustaša emigrants on 17 October 1934. Pavelić was imprisoned in Turin and released in March 1936. After he met with Eugen Dido Kvaternik on Christmas 1934 in prison, he stated that assassination was "the only language Serbs understand". During his time in prison, Pavelić was informed about the situation in Yugoslavia and the 5 May 1935 election, in which a coalition of opposition parties was led by HSS leader Vladko Maček. Pavelić declared the election results as a "success of the Ustaše actions". By the mid-1930s, graffiti with the initials ŽAP meaning "Long live Ante Pavelić" (Croatian: Živio Ante Pavelić) had begun to appear on the streets of Zagreb.

After Pavelić's released from prison, he remained under surveillance by the Italian authorities, and his Ustaše were interned. Disappointed with relations between the Italians and the Ustaše organization, Pavelić became closer to Nazi Germany, who promised to change the map of Europe fixed under the 1919 Treaty of Versailles. In October 1936, he finished a survey for the German Ministry of Foreign Affairs called the Croatian Question (Croatian: Hrvatsko pitanje; German: Die kroatische Frage). According to Ivo Goldstein, the survey deemed the "Serbian state authorities, international Freemasonry, Jews and communism"’ as enemies and stated that:

Today almost all banking and almost all trade in Croatia is in the hands of the Jews. This became possible only because the state gave them privileges, because the government believed that this would weaken Croatian national strength. The Jews greeted the foundation of the so-called Yugoslav state with great enthusiasm because a national Croatian state would never suit them as well as Yugoslavia did. ... All the press in Croatia is in Jewish hands. This Jewish Freemason press is constantly attacking Germany, the German people and national socialism.

According to Matković, after 1937, Pavelić paid more attention to the Ustaše in Yugoslavia than elsewhere, since the emigrants had become passive after the assassination. In 1938, he instructed the Ustaše to form stations in Yugoslav towns. The fall of Stojadinović's government and the creation of the Banovina of Croatia in 1939 further increased Ustaše activity; they founded Uzdanica (Hope), a savings co-operative. Under Uzdanica, Ustaše founded Ustaše University Headquarters and the illegal association Matija Gubec. However, Pavlowitch observes that Pavelić had few contacts with the Ustaše within Yugoslavia, and that his esteemed position within the Ustaše was partly due to his isolation in Italy. Despite their rise in activity in the 1930s, the movement experienced only moderate growth of popularity, and remained a marginal group.

In the late 1930s, about half of the 500 Ustaša in Italy were voluntarily repatriated to Yugoslavia, went underground and increased their activities. During the intensification of ties with Nazi Germany in the 1930s, Pavelić's concept of the Croatian nation became increasingly race-oriented.

On 1 April 1937, after the Stojadinović-Ciano agreement, all Ustaše units were dissolved by the Italian government. After that, Pavelić was put under house arrest in Siena, where he lived until 1939. During this period he penned his anti-Bolshevik work Horrors and Mistakes (Italian: Errori e orrori; Croatian: Strahote zabluda) which was published in 1938. It was immediately seized by the authorities. At the onset of World War II he moved to a villa near Florence under police watch until spring 1941.

After Italy occupied Albania and prepared an attack on Yugoslavia, Ciano invited Pavelić to negotiations. They discussed Croatian armed revolt, Italian military intervention and the creation of a Croatian state with monetary, customs and personal unions with Italy, which Pavelić later refused.

In 1940, Pavelić negotiated with the Italians for military assistance in creating a separate Croatian state which would have had strong ties to Italy, but this plan was postponed by the invasion of France, and subsequently derailed by Adolf Hitler.

== Ustaše regime ==
=== Establishment ===
On 25 March 1941, Yugoslavia signed the Tripartite Pact, but two days later the government was overthrown in a bloodless military coup by opponents who were motivated by a range of factors.

Two days after the Belgrade coup, Mussolini invited Pavelić from Florence to his private residence in Rome, the Villa Torlonia; this was their first meeting since Pavelić's arrival in Italy. Pavelić was escorted by Matija Bzik, but Mussolini received only Pavelić. Acting Foreign Minister Filippo Anfuso was present during the meeting.

Pavelić and Mussolini discussed Croatia's position after Yugoslav capitulation. Mussolini was concerned that Italian designs on Dalmatia be achieved, and in response Pavelić acknowledged the agreements he had made earlier and reassured him. Pavelić requested the release of the remaining interned Ustaše, an Italian liaison officer was allocated to him, and the Italians also lent him a radio station in Florence so he could conduct late evening broadcasts. On 1 April 1941 Pavelić called for the liberation of Croatia.

On 6 April 1941, the Axis invaded Yugoslavia from multiple directions, rapidly overwhelming the under-prepared Royal Yugoslav Army which capitulated 11 days later. The German operational plan included making 'political promises to the Croats' to increase internal discord.

The Germans generally preferred to collaborate with non-fascists who were willing to work with them, and only placed out-and-out fascists in charge as a last resort. Croatia was no exception. The Nazis wanted any Croatian puppet government to have popular support, so that they could control their zone of occupation with minimal forces and exploit the available resources peacefully. The administration of Banovina Croatia had been under the control of an alliance of Vladko Maček's HSS and the mostly Croatian Serb Independent Democratic Party. Maček was very popular among Croats, had been vice-premier in the Yugoslav Cvetković government, was a supporter of Yugoslav accession to the Axis and had a ready made para-military force in the form of the HSS Croatian Peasant Defence. As a result, the Germans attempted to get Maček to proclaim an "independent Croatian state" and form a government. When he refused to cooperate, the Germans decided they had no alternative other than to support Pavelić, even though they considered that the Ustaše could not provide an assurance they could govern in the way the Germans wanted.

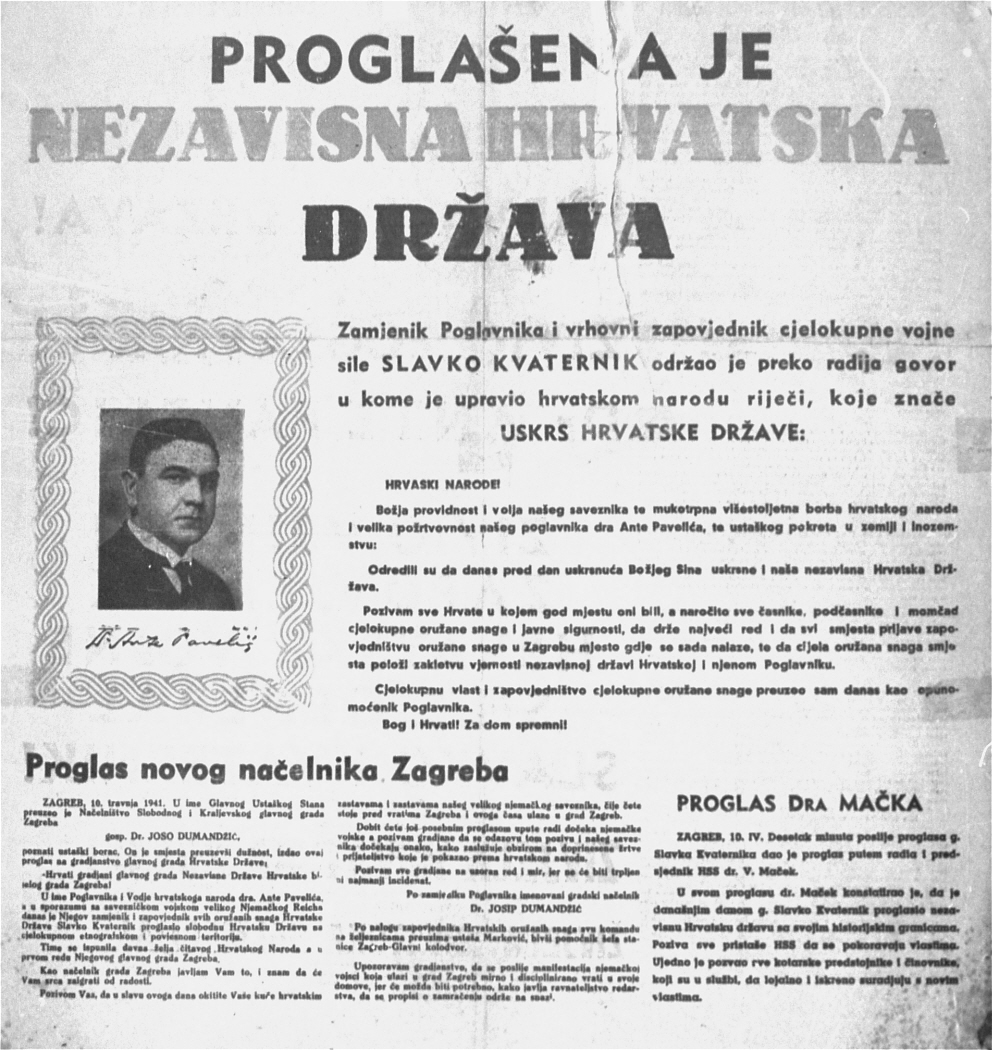
The official proclamation of the Independent State of Croatia by Slavko Kvaternik

It was estimated by the Germans that Pavelić had around 900 sworn Ustaše in Yugoslavia at the time of the invasion, and the Ustaše themselves considered that their supporters only numbered some 40,000. The Germans also considered Pavelić to be an Italian agent or "Mussolini's man", but considered that other senior Ustašas such as deputy leader (Croatian: Doglavnik) Slavko Kvaternik were sufficiently pro-German to ensure their interests would be supported by any regime led by Pavelić.

On 10 April 1941, Kvaternik declared an Independent State of Croatia in the name of the Poglavnik Ante Pavelić via the Zagreb Radio Station. Kvaternik was acting on the orders of SS-Brigadeführer (Brigadier) Edmund Veesenmayer. The proclamation was viewed favourably by a significant portion of the population, particularly those living in Zagreb, western Herzegovina and Lika. The Croatian Peasant Defence, which had been infiltrated by the Ustaše, assisted by disarming Royal Yugoslav Army units and imposing some control. However, the Ustashe received limited support from ordinary Croats. The commander of German forces in the NDH estimated that only around 2% of the country's population supported the Ustashe regime.

The Ustaše that had been interned in Italy had been concentrated at Pistoia, about 50 km from Florence where they were issued with Italian uniforms and small arms. They were joined by Pavelić on 10 April and listened to radio broadcasts announcing the proclamation of the NDH. Pavelić's visit to Pistoia was actually his first meeting with the Ustaše after the assassination in Marseilles. In Pistoia, Pavelić gave a speech in which he announced that their struggle for an independent Croatia was near the end. After that he returned to his home in Florence where he heard Kvaternik's proclamation on a radio broadcast from Vienna. On 11 April, Pavelić went to Rome, where he was hosted by Anfuso, after which he was received by Mussolini. During the meeting Pavelić was guaranteed that his government would be recognized immediately after he arrived in Zagreb.

After a meeting in Rome, Pavelić boarded the train with his Ustaše escort and went to Zagreb via Trieste and Rijeka. He arrived at Karlovac on 13 April with about 250—400 Ustaše where was greeted by Veesenmayer who was appointed by German foreign minister Joachim von Ribbentrop to supervise the state's creation. In Karlovac, Pavelić was asked to confirm that he had not made any commitments to the Italians, but Mussolini's envoy arrived while he was there and negotiations ensued to ensure that his messages to Hitler and Mussolini would deal satisfactorily with the questions of Dalmatia and recognition by the Axis powers. This issue was the first sign of Italo-German tensions over the NDH.

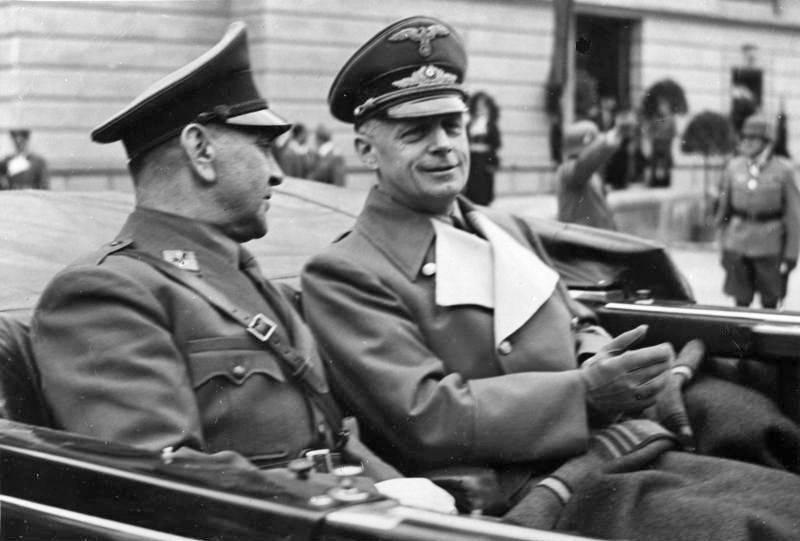
Ante Pavelić (left) and German Foreign Minister Joachim von Ribbentrop in June 1941

Diplomatic recognition of the NDH by the Axis was delayed to ensure that Pavelić made the promised territorial concessions to Italy. These concessions meant that Pavelić handed to Italy some 5,400 square kilometres of territory with a population of 380,000, consisting of about 280,000 Croats, 90,000 Serbs, 5,000 Italians and 5,000 others. Once this was completed Pavelić travelled to Zagreb on 15 April, and Axis recognition was also granted to the NDH on that day.

On 16 April 1941, Pavelić signed a decree appointing the new Croatian State Government. He was the first to take an oath, after which he stated:

Since 1102, [the] Croatian people [haven't had an] autonomous and independent state. And there, after...839 years, the time has come to form [a] responsible Croatian government.

Pavelić thus presented the NDH as the embodiment of the "historical aspirations of the Croatian people". The decree named Osman Kulenović as the vice-president of the government, and Slavko Kvaternik as Pavelić's deputy, and appointed eight other senior Ustaše as ministers. The Ustaše made use of the existing bureaucracy of the Banovina of Croatia, after it had been purged and "ustašised". The new regime drew upon the concept of an uninterrupted Croatian state since the arrival of the Croats in their contemporary homeland, and reflected extreme Croat nationalism mixed with Nazism and Italian Fascism, Catholic clerical authoritarianism and the peasantism of the Croatian Peasant Party.

When the anti-Serb atrocities were under way, Pavelić remained a devoted Catholic: he participated in mass in his chapel, worshipped and confessed his sins.

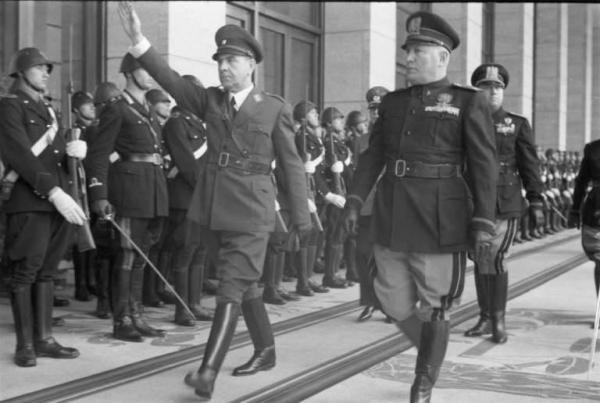
Ante Pavelić and Benito Mussolini in 1941, when Italy recognized Croatia as a sovereign state

Pavelić tried to prolong the negotiations with Italy about the boundary between the two states. At the time, he was receiving support from Berlin. Ciano insisted that Italy must annex the whole Croatian littoral, and after some time the Germans pulled back to protect German-Italian relations. On 25 April, Pavelić and Ciano met in Ljubljana again discussing borders. Ciano's first proposal was Italian annexation of the whole Croatian littoral and hinterland all the way to Karlovac. Another proposal was somewhat less demanding but with closer ties with Italy, including a monetary, customs and personal union. Pavelić refused and instead demanded that Croatian gain the towns of Trogir, Split and Dubrovnik. Ciano did not respond, but promised another meeting. Pavelić was still counting on German support, but without success. On 7 May 1941, Pavelić and Mussolini met in Tržič and agreed to discuss the matter in Rome. On 18 May 1941 Pavelić went to Rome with his delegation and signed a Treaty of Rome in which Croatia gave up part of Dalmatia, Krk, Rab, Korčula, Biograd, Šibenik, Trogir, Split, Čiovo, Veliki i Mali Drvenik, Šolta, Mljet and parts of Konavle and the Bay of Kotor to Italy. A Croatian proposal that Split and Korčula Island be jointly administered was ignored. These annexations shocked the people and led to the only public demonstration recorded in the Independent State of Croatia's history.

Hundreds of citizens, members of the Ustaše Movement and the Domobranstvo (Army) protested on 25 December 1941. Pavelić tried to retrieve the lost areas, but kept his real feelings and those of the people from the Italians to maintain the pretext of good relations.

=== Prime minister ===
Pavelić agreed to name Prince Aimone, Duke of Spoleto, as King of Croatia to avoid a union with the Kingdom of Italy, but delayed the formalities in the hope of gaining more territory in return for accepting the new king. Aimone was officially declared King of the Independent State of Croatia on 18 May 1941 under the name of Tomislav II, and he appointed Pavelić as Prime Minister. In March 1942, Aimone succeeded his brother to become The 4th Duke of Aosta. However, the King's powers were purely ceremonial, to the point that he never even visited Croatia during his reign, but preferred to deal with his royal duties from an office in Rome. On 10 July 1941, Pavelić accepted the annexation of Međimurje by Hungary.

==== Legislation ====
On 14 April 1941, in one of his first acts after assuming power, Pavelić signed the 'Decree-Law concerning the Preservation of Croatian National Property', which annulled all large property transactions made by Jews in the two months prior to the proclamation of the NDH.

He signed the Law-Decree on Protection of the Nation and the State on 17 April 1941, which came into effect immediately, was retrospective, and imposed the death penalty for any actions causing harm to the honour or vital interests of the NDH. This law was the first of three decrees that effectively placed the Serb, Jewish and Roma populations of the NDH outside the law and lead to their persecution and destruction.

On 19 and 22 April, the Ustashe issued decrees suspending all employees of state and local governments, and state enterprises. This allowed the new regime to get rid of all unwanted employees – "in principle this meant all Jews, Serbs and all Yugoslav-oriented Croats"

On 25 April 1941, he signed into law a decree prohibiting the use of the Cyrillic alphabet, which directly impacted on the Serbian Orthodox population of the NDH, as the rites of the church were written in Cyrillic.

On 30 April 1941, Pavelić enacted the 'Law concerning Nationality', which essentially made all Jews non-citizens, and this was followed by further laws restricting their movement and residency. From 23 May all Jews were required to wear yellow identification tags, and on 26 June Pavelić issued a decree which blamed Jews for activities against the NDH and ordered their internment in concentration camps.

==== Poglavnik ====
Pavelić's standard

As Prime Minister of the NDH, Pavelić had full control over the state. The oath taken by all government employees declared that Pavelić represented the sovereignty of the NDH. His title Poglavnik represented the close ties between the Croatian state and the Ustaše movement, since he had the same title as leader of the Ustaše. Moreover, Pavelić made all significant decisions, including naming state ministers and leaders of the Ustaše. As the NDH had no functional legislature, Pavelić approved all of the laws, which made him the most powerful person in the state. Through the incorporation of the extreme right-wing of the popular HSS, Pavelić's regime was initially accepted by the majority of Croats in the NDH. The regime also attempted to re-write history by falsely claiming the legacy of the founder of the HSS Stjepan Radić, and that of Croatian nationalist Ante Starčević.

Soon afterwards, Pavelić visited Pope Pius XII in May 1941, attempting to win Vatican recognition, but failed (although the Papacy placed a legat in Zagreb). The Vatican maintained relations with the Yugoslav Government-in-exile.

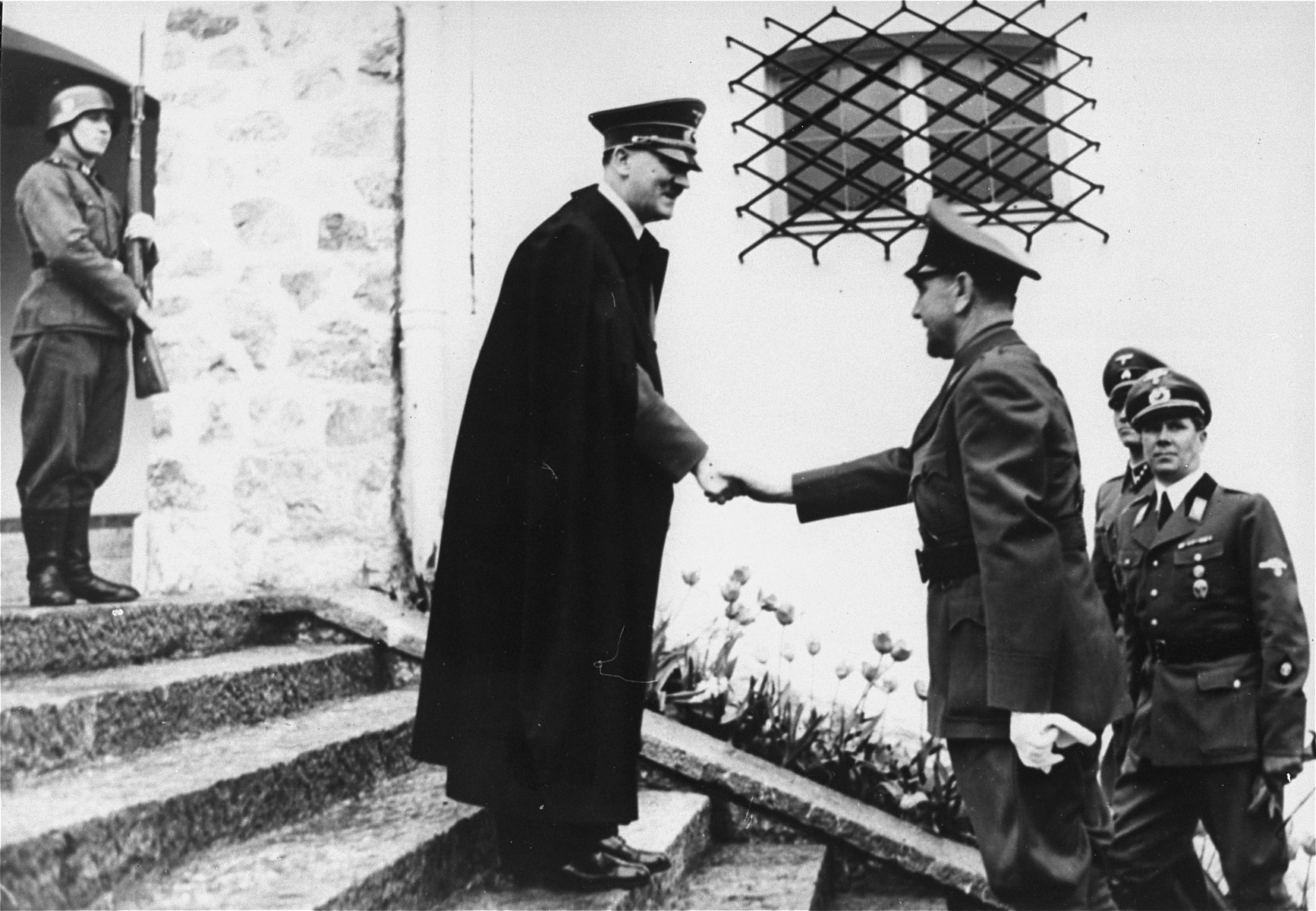
Poglavnik Pavelić greeted by Hitler on 9 June 1941 upon his arrival at the Berghof for a state visit

On 9 June 1941, Pavelić visited Hitler at the Berghof. Hitler impressed on Pavelić that he should maintain a policy of "national intolerance" for fifty years. Hitler also encouraged Pavelić to accept Slovenian immigrants and deport Serbs to the Territory of the Military Commander in Serbia. Over the next few months, the Ustaše deported around 120,000 Serbs.

In July 1941, the German Plenipotentiary General in the NDH, Edmund Glaise von Horstenau met with Pavelić to express his "grave concern over the excesses of the Ustaše". This was the first of many occasions over the next three years during which von Horstenau and Pavelić clashed over the conduct of the Ustaše. By the end of 1941, the acceptance of the Ustaše regime by most Croats had been transformed into disappointment and discontent, and as a result of the terror perpetrated by the regime some pro-Yugoslav sentiment was beginning to re-emerge, along with pro-communist feelings. The discontent was made worse when Pavelić had Vladko Maček arrested and sent to Jasenovac concentration camp in October 1941. By the end of 1941 HSS propaganda leaflets were urging peasants to be patient as the "day of liberation is near!"

In the public arena there were efforts to create a cult of personality around Pavelić. These efforts included the imposition of a Nazi-style salute, emphasising that he had been sentenced to death in absentia by a Yugoslav court, and repeatedly claiming that he had undergone great hardship to achieve the independence of the NDH. Pavelić summoned the Sabor on 24 January 1942. It met between 23 and 28 February, but it had little influence and after December 1942 was never called again.

Pavelić speaks at the Croatian Parliament on 23 February 1942

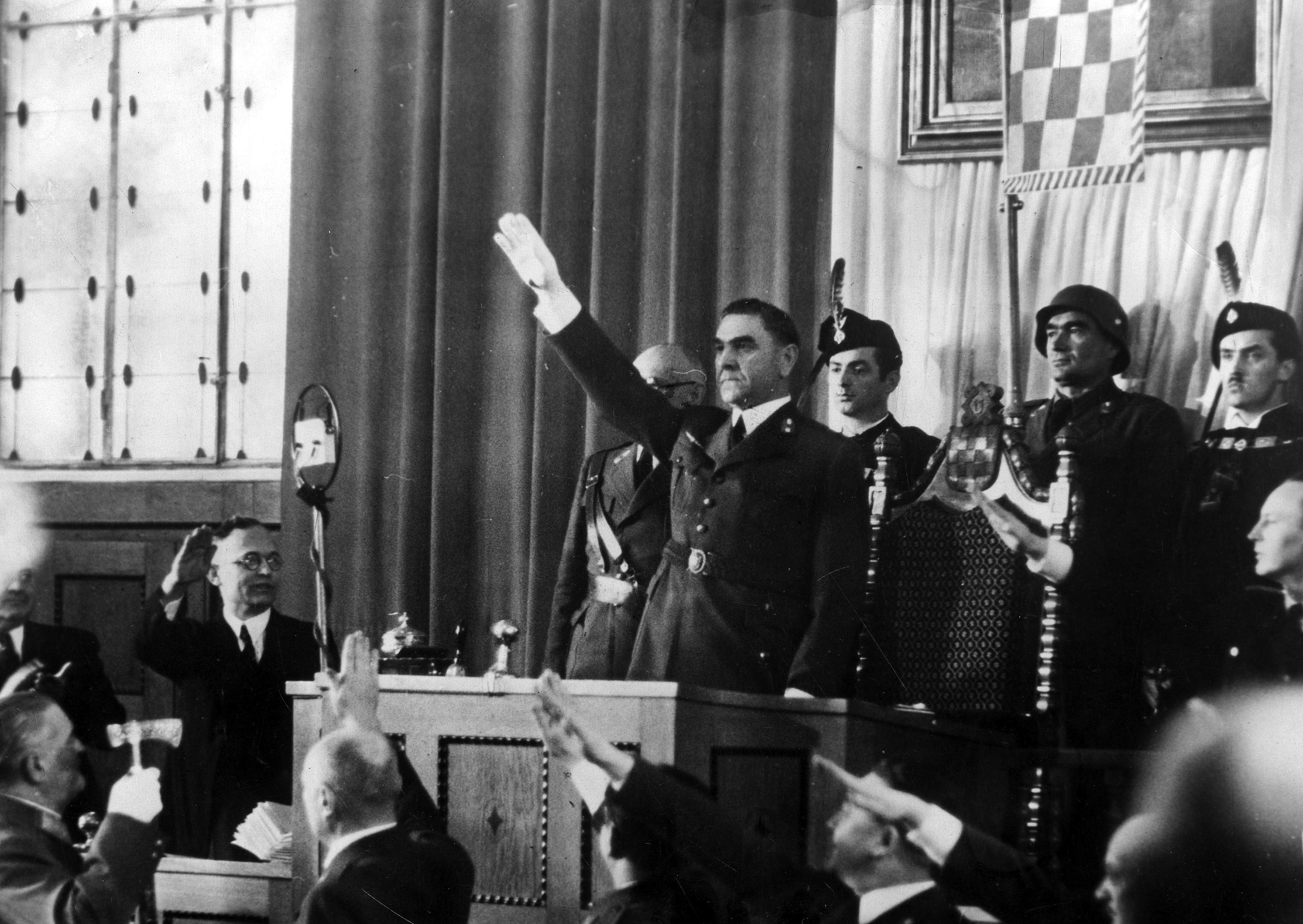
Pavelić greeting the Croatian parliament in February 1942

On 3 March 1942, Hitler awarded Pavelić the Grand Cross of the Order of the German Eagle. Siegfried Kasche, the German envoy, handed it to him in Zagreb. Eugen Dido Kvaternik, son of Slavko Kvaternik, and one of the main protagonists in the Ustaše genocide of the Serbs stated that Pavelić directed Croat nationalism against the Serbs in order to distract the Croat population from a potential backlash against the Italians over his territorial concessions to them in Dalmatia. The worst policies directed against minorities were Ustaše-run concentration and forced labor camps. The most notorious camp was the Jasenovac concentration camp, where 80,000–100,000 people died, including around 18,000 Croatian Jews, or around 90% of the pre-World War II Jewish community.

Pavelić founded the Croatian Orthodox Church with the aim of pacifying the Serbs. However, the underlying ideology behind the creation of the Croatian Orthodox Church was connected to the ideas of Ante Starčević, who considered that Serbs were "Orthodox Croats", and reflected a desire to create a Croatian state comprising three main religious groupings, Roman Catholic, Muslim and Croatian Orthodox. There is some evidence that the status of Sarajevo Serbs improved after they joined the Croatian Orthodox Church in significant numbers. Through both forcible and voluntary conversions between 1941 and 1945, 244,000 Serbs were converted to Catholicism.

In June 1942, Pavelić met with General Roatta and they agreed that Ustaše administration could be returned to Zone 3 except in towns with Italian garrisons. Pavelić agreed to the continued presence of the Chetnik Anti-Communist Volunteer Militia in this zone, and that the Italians would intervene in Zone 3 if they considered that was necessary. The result of this agreement was that Italian forces largely withdrew from areas that the NDH had virtually no presence and no means by which to reimpose their authority. This created a wide no-man's land from the Sandžak to western Bosnia in which the Chetniks and Partisans could operate. By mid-1942, Pavelić's regime effectively controlled only the Zagreb region along with some larger towns that were home to strong NDH and German garrisons.

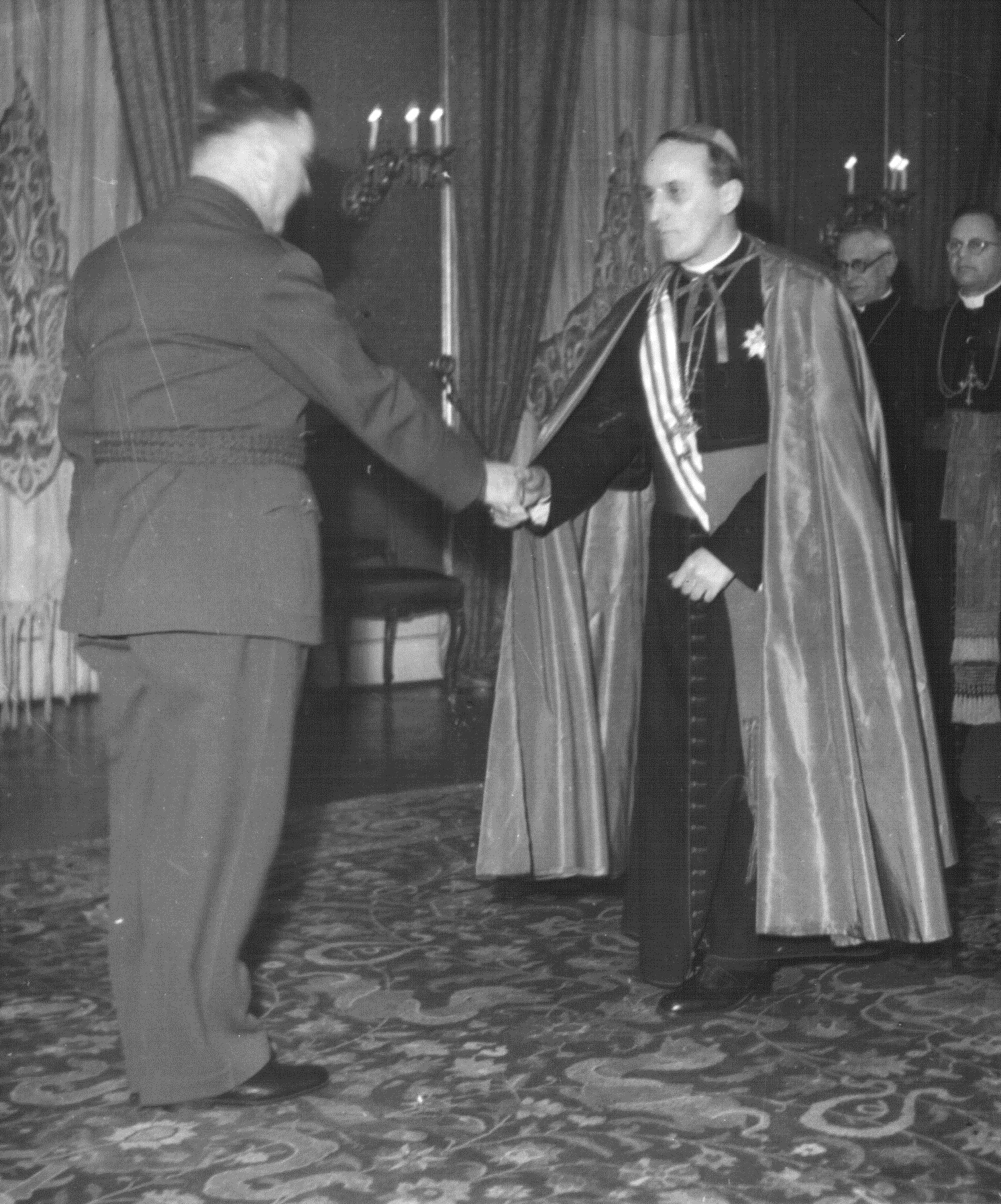
Pavelić with Roman Catholic Archbishop Stepinac (1943)

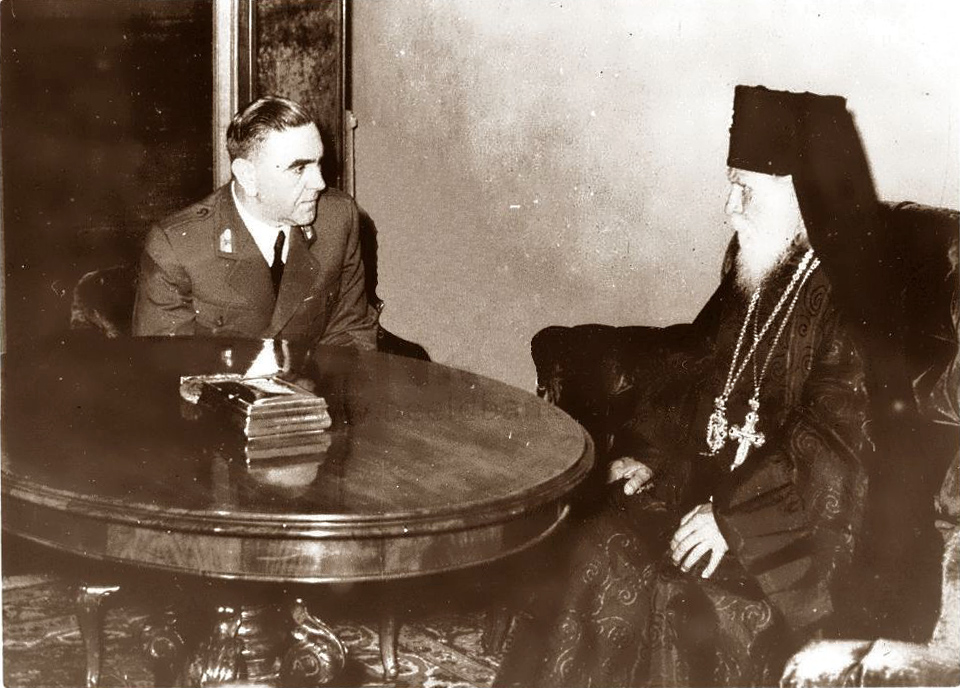
Pavelić with Archbishop Germogen of the Croatian Orthodox Church (1942)

Pavelić loyalists, mainly Ustaše, wanted to fight the Communist-led partisans while others, unnerved by the idea of a new Yugoslavia, also supported him. In 1941–42, the majority of Partisans in Croatia were Serbs, but by October 1943 the majority were Croats. This change was partly due to the decision of a key Croatian Peasant Party member, Božidar Magovac, to join the Partisans in June 1943, and partly due to the capitulation of Italy.

Pavelić and his government devoted attention to culture. Although most literature was propaganda, many books did not have an ideological basis, which allowed Croatian culture to flourish. The Croatian National Theatre received many world-famous actors as visitors. The major cultural milestone was the publication of the Croatian Encyclopedia, a work later outlawed under the Communist regime. In 1941 the Croatian Football Association joined FIFA.

On 16 December 1941, Pavelić met with Italian Foreign Minister Ciano in Venice and advised him that there were no more than 12,000 Jews left in the NDH.

In the second half of 1942, the Wehrmacht Commander-in-Chief of the South East, Generaloberst Alexander Löhr and Glaise urged Hitler to have Pavelić remove both the incompetent Slavko Kvaternik and his son the bloodthirsty Eugen "Dido" Kvaternik from power. When Pavelić visited Hitler in Ukraine in September 1942, he agreed. The following month Slavko Kvaternik was allowed to retire to Slovakia, and Eugen went with him. Pavelić then used the Kvaternik's as scapegoats for both the terror of 1941–42 and the failure of NDH forces to impose law and order within the state.

In January 1943, Glaise told Pavelić that it would be better for everyone "if all concentration camps in the NDH were closed and their inmates sent to work in Germany". Löhr also tried to get Hitler to remove Pavelić, disband the Ustaše and appoint Glaise as plenipotentiary general with supreme authority over the territory of the NDH. By March Hitler had decided to give the task of pacifying the NDH to the Reichsführer-SS (Field Marshal) Heinrich Himmler, who appointed his own plenipotentiary, Generalleutnant der Polizei (Major General of Police) Konstantin Kammerhofer. Kammerhofer brought the 7th SS Volunteer Mountain Division Prinz Eugen to the NDH and established a 20,000-strong German gendarmerie with a core of 6,000 Volksdeutsche reinforced by Croats taken from the NDH Home Guard and police. This new gendarmerie swore allegiance to Hitler, not Pavelić.

Shortly before the Italian capitulation, Pavelić appointed a new government led by Nikola Mandić as prime minister, which included Miroslav Navratil as Minister of the Armed Forces. Navratil was suggested by Glaise, and was appointed by Pavelić to placate the Germans. As a direct result, the 170,000-strong armed forces of the NDH were reorganised under German control into smaller units with greater mobility and the size of the Ustaše militia was also increased to 45,000.

In September 1944, Pavelić met with Hitler for the last time. Pavelić requested that the Germans stop arming and supplying Chetnik units, and asked that the Germans disarm the Chetniks or allow the NDH to disarm them. Hitler agreed that the Chetniks could not be trusted, and issued orders to German forces to stop cooperating with the Chetniks and assist NDH authorities to disarm them. However, German commanders were given sufficient leeway that they were able to avoid carrying out the orders.

=== After the Italian capitulation ===
Following the fall of Fascism in Italy, Tomislav II abdicated as King of Croatia on the orders of Victor Emmanuel III. With the King officially gone, Pavelić assumed functions as Head of State of the NDH under the title of Poglavnik and appointed Nikola Mandić as new prime minister. Italy was later invaded and occupied by the Germans in Operation Achse.

As soon as the Italians capitulated in September 1943, Pavelić was quick to amalgamate Italian-annexed Dalmatia into the NDH and offer an amnesty to Croats that had joined the rebels. However, the Germans occupied the previously Italian-occupied zone themselves, including the mines and key agricultural areas. By November 1943, Pavelić and his regime controlled little of the territory of the NDH, and by March 1944 SS-Brigadeführer und Generalmajor der Waffen-SS (Brigadier) Ernst Fick observed that "In terms of power, Dr. Ante Pavelić is only mayor of the city of Zagreb, excluding the suburbs".

One of the key events in the history of the Independent State of Croatia was the Lorković-Vokić coup of 1944. Minister Mladen Lorković and army officer Ante Vokić suggested a plan whereby Croatia would change sides in the war and Pavelić would no longer be head of state in accordance with British demands. At first, Pavelić supported their ideas but changed his mind following a visit from a local Gestapo officer who told him that Germany would win the war with new weapons under development.

Pavelić arrested Lorković and Vokić along with others involved in the coup (some representatives of the Croatian Peasant Party and a number of Domobran officers). Lorković and Vokić were shot at the end of April 1945 in the Lepoglava prison. After plans for an "Anglo-American" coup were discovered, from September 1944 until February 1945, Pavelić negotiated with the Soviet Union. The Soviets agreed to recognize the Croatian state on condition that the Red Army had free access and Communists were allowed free rein. Pavelić refused their proposal and remained allied with Nazi Germany until the end of the war.

=== Genocide ===
As leader of the Independent State of Croatia, Pavelić was the main instigator of the genocidal crimes committed in the NDH, and was responsible for a campaign of terror against Serbs, Jews, Roma and anti-Axis Croats and Bosniaks which included a network of concentration camps. Numerous testimonies from the Nuremberg Trials along with records in German, Italian and Austrian war archives bear witness to atrocities perpetrated against the civilian population. The NDH's racial policies greatly contributed to their rapid loss of control over Croatia as they fed the ranks of both the Chetniks and Partisans and caused even the Nazis to attempt to restrain Pavelić and his genocidal campaign.

In terms of the proportion of the state population killed by its own government, the Pavelić regime was the most murderous in Europe after Stalin's Soviet Union, Hitler's Germany, and outside of Europe has only been exceeded by the Khmer Rouge in Cambodia and some genocides in African states. As the main instigator of the genocide, Pavelić was supported by his closest associate Eugen Dido Kvaternik and Minister of Interior Andrija Artuković, who were responsible for planning and organization, and Vjekoslav Luburić, who executed the orders.

In late April 1941, Pavelić was interviewed by an Italian journalist, Alfio Russo. Pavelić stated that Serb rebels would be killed. In response, Russo asked him, "what if all Serbs rebel?" Pavelić answered, "We shall kill them all." Around this time the first mass atrocities occurred, the Gudovac, Veljun and Glina massacres, which were committed by groups of Ustaše under the direct command of Luburić.

Serbian, Jewish, and Romani men, women, and children were hacked to death. Whole villages were razed and people driven into barns, which the Ustaše then set on fire. Synagogues were also destroyed, most notably, the main one in Zagreb, which was completely razed. General Edmund von Glaise-Horstenau reported to the German Army Command OKW on 28 June 1941.

... according to reliable reports from countless German military and civil observers during the last few weeks the Ustaše have gone raving mad.

On 10 July, General Glaise-Horstenau added:

Our troops have to be mute witnesses of such events; it does not reflect well on their otherwise high reputation ... I am frequently told that German occupation troops would finally have to intervene against Ustaše crimes. This may happen eventually. Right now, with the available forces, I could not ask for such action. Ad hoc intervention in individual cases could make the German Army look responsible for countless crimes which it could not prevent in the past.

A report (to SS chief Heinrich Himmler, dated 17 February 1942) on increased partisan activities stated that "Increased activity of the bands is chiefly due to atrocities carried out by Ustaše units in Croatia against the Orthodox population." The Ustaše committed their crimes not only against males of conscript age, but especially against helpless elderly people, women and children.

Between 172,000 and 290,000 Serbs, 31,000 of the 40,000 Jews, and almost all of the 25,000—40,000 Roma were killed in the Independent State of Croatia by the Ustaše and their Axis allies. Both Jews and Roma were subject to a policy of extermination. According to an official Yugoslav report, only 1,500 out of 30,000 Croatian Jews remained alive at the end of World War II. Approximately 26,000 Roma were murdered of approximately 40,000 residents. Some 26,000 Croatian anti-fascists (Partisans, political opponents and civilians) were also killed by the NDH regime, including an estimated 5,000-12,000 Croat anti-fascists and other dissidents that were killed at the Jasenovac concentration camp alone.

=== End of the NDH ===
Seeing Germany's collapse and aware that the Croatian army could not resist the Communists, Pavelić started a move of his forces to Austria, causing several groups of tens of thousands of Croatian soldiers as well as civilians to start a major northward march without a clear strategy. Pavelić left the country on 6 May 1945, and on 8 May, he convened a final meeting of the NDH government in Rogaška Slatina. At the meeting, General Alexander Löhr informed the government of Germany's capitulation and handed command of the NDH forces to Pavelić. Pavelić subsequently named General Vjekoslav Luburić commander. Later that day Pavelić's convoy passed into the Soviet occupation zone in Austria, separate from the rest of the NDH government which went to the British occupation zone. The group made it into the American occupation zone and by 18 May arrived at the village of Leingreith near Radstadt where Pavelić's wife Mara and their two daughters had been living after leaving the NDH in December 1944.

On 8 May, Pavelić ordered that the columns from NDH continue to Austria, and that they refuse to surrender to the advancing Yugoslav Army, instead planning to surrender to the British. However, they were instead turned back in the mid-May Bleiburg repatriations, and many were subsequently killed by the Yugoslav Army. The sheer number of civilians slowed down the retreat, made the surrender unfeasible to the Allies, and ultimately led to the belief that they were nothing more than a human shield to the Ustashe. For his abandonment of Croatian soldiers and civilians, later Croatian emigrants would accuse Pavelić of cowardice.

Several members of the NDH government were executed after a one-day trial in Zagreb on 6 June. Shortly after this, Pavelić moved to the village of Tiefbrunau closer to Salzburg. In September, American officials – believing the family were refugees and unaware of their identity – resettled them in the village of St. Gilgen. After St Gilgen, Pavelić stayed with the family of a prewar Macedonian revolutionary for several weeks before settling in Obertrum. Pavelić stayed there until April 1946.

== Post-war ==
=== Italy ===
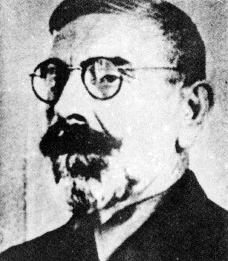
Pavelić's photo on his false passport under name Pablo Aranjos

He entered Italy disguised as a priest with a Peruvian passport. Passing Venice and Florence, he arrived in Rome in the spring of 1946 disguised as a Catholic priest and using the name Don Pedro Gonner. On arrival in Rome, he was provided shelter by the Vatican clergy and stayed at a number of residences that belonged to the Vatican while in Rome, where he started to gather his associates. Pavelić formed the Croatian State Committee (Croatian: Hrvatski državni odbor) headed by Lovro Sušić, Mate Frković and Božidar Kavran.

Tito and his new Communist government accused the Catholic Church of harboring Pavelić who they stated, along with the Western "imperialists", wanted to "revive Nazism" and take over communist Eastern Europe. The Yugoslav press claimed that Pavelić had stayed at the papal summer residence at Castel Gandolfo, while CIA information states that he stayed at a monastery near the papal residence in the summer and autumn of 1948.

For some time, Pavelić hid in a Jesuit house near Naples. In autumn of 1948, he met Krunoslav Draganović, a Roman Catholic priest, who helped him obtain a Red Cross passport in the Hungarian name of Pál Aranyos. Draganović allegedly planned to deliver Pavelić to the Italian police, but Pavelić avoided capture and fled to Argentina. The US never had any intention to have Pavelić extradited to Yugoslavia, even if they had known his location.

=== Argentina, Chile and attempted assassination ===
Pavelić arrived in Buenos Aires on 6 November 1948, on the Italian merchant ship Sestriere, where he initially lived with the former Ustaša and writer Vinko Nikolić. In Buenos Aires Pavelić was joined by his son Velimir and daughter Mirjana. Soon afterwards, his wife Maria and older daughter Višnja also arrived.

Pavelić took up employment as a security advisor to Argentinian president Juan Perón. Pavelić's arrival documents show the assumed name of Pablo Aranjos, which he continued to use. In 1950 Pavelić was given amnesty and allowed to stay in Argentina along with 34,000 other Croats, including former Nazi collaborators and those who had fled from the Allied advance. Following this, Pavelić reverted to his earlier pseudonym Antonio Serdar and continued to live in Buenos Aires.

According to Robert B. McCormick, the Vatican saw Pavelić as a man who had made mistakes but had fought for the just cause.

As for most other political immigrants in Argentina, life was hard and he had to work (as a bricklayer). His best contact with the Peróns was another former Ustaša Branko Benzon, who enjoyed good relations with Evita Perón, wife of the president. Benzon had briefly been the Croatian ambassador to Germany during World War II and had known Hitler personally, which benefited Croatian-German relations. Thanks to Benzon's friendship with Evita Perón, Pavelić became the owner of an influential building company. Not long after arriving he joined the Ustaše-related "Croatian Home Guard" (Croatian: Hrvatski domobran) organization.

At the end of the 1940s, many former Ustaše split from Pavelić because they believed that Croats, now under new circumstances, needed new political direction. Many who split from Pavelić continued to call themselves Ustaše and sought the revival of the Independent State of Croatia. The most well known of these separatists was the former Ustaše officer and head of the NDH concentration and extermination camp network, Vjekoslav Luburić, who lived in Spain. In Argentina, Pavelić used the "Croatian Home Guard" to gather Croatian political emigrants. Pavelić tried to expand the activities of this organization, and in 1950 founded the Croatian Statehood Party, which ceased to exist that year.

On 10 April 1951, on the 10th anniversary of the Independent State of Croatia, Pavelić announced the Croatia State Government. This new government considered itself to be a government in exile. Other Ustaše emigrants continued to arrive in Argentina, and they united under Pavelić's leadership, increasing their political activities. Pavelić himself remained politically active, publishing various statements, articles, and speeches in which he claimed that the Yugoslav Communist regime promoted Serbian hegemony.

In 1954, Pavelić met with Milan Stojadinović, a former Royal Yugoslav Prime Minister, who also lived in Buenos Aires. The subject of their meeting was trying to find a solution for the historic conciliation between the Serbs and Croats. The meeting stirred controversy, but had no practical significance. On 8 June 1956, Pavelić and other Ustaše immigrants founded the Croatian Liberation Movement (Croatian: Hrvatski oslobodilački pokret or HOP), which aimed to re-establish Nazism and the NDH. The HOP saw itself as "a determined adversary of communism, atheism and Yugoslavism in any possible form".

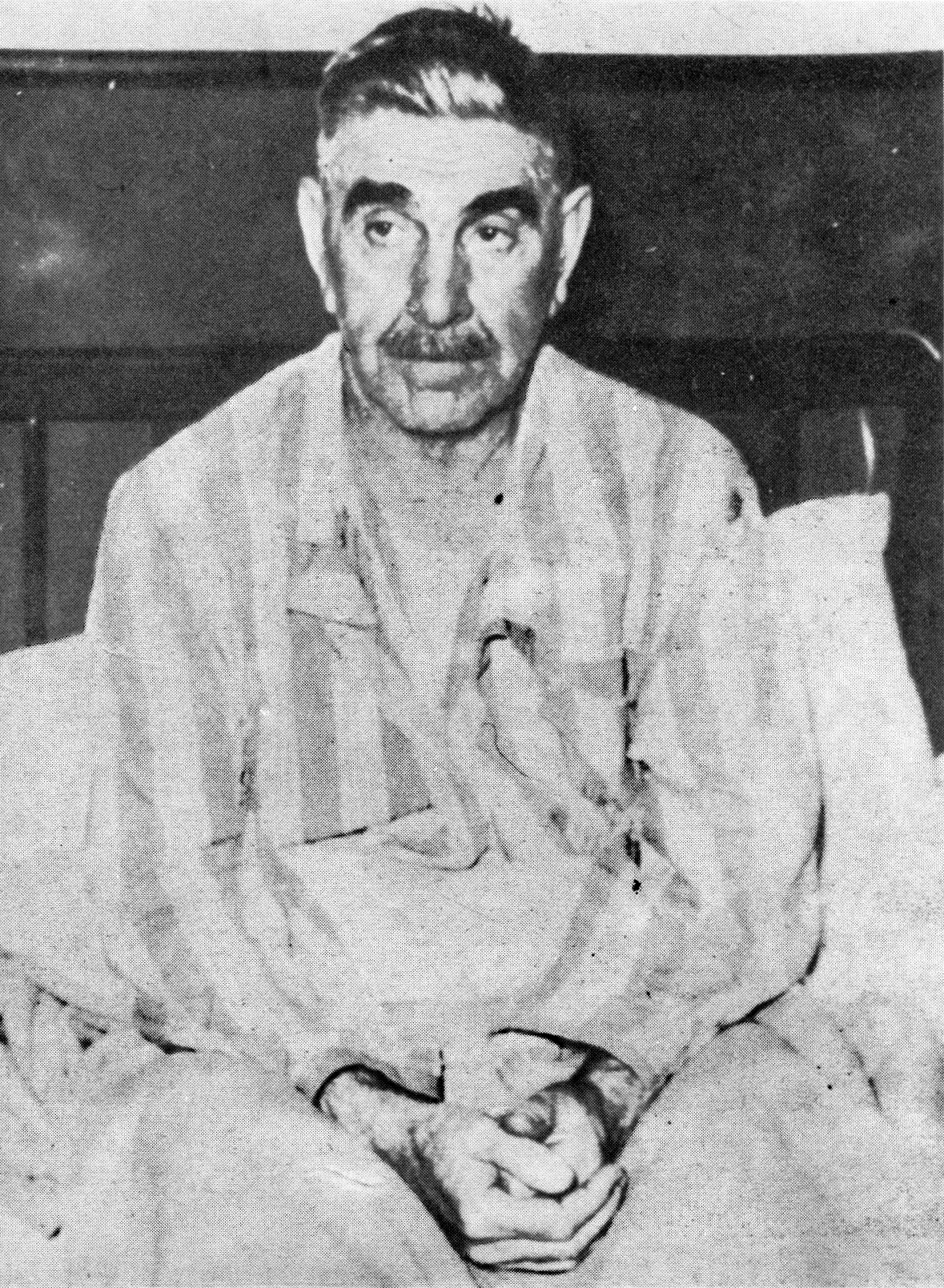
Pavelić at the Syrian Lebanese Hospital in Villa Devoto after the failed assassination attempt in Ciudad Jardín Lomas del Palomar.

On 10 April 1957, the 16th anniversary of the founding of the Independent State of Croatia, Pavelić was grievously wounded in an assassination attempt.

Pavelić was shot in the back and collar bone while exiting a bus in El Palomar, a Buenos Aires suburb near his home. Pavelić was transferred to the Syrian-Lebanese hospital, where his true identity was established. After Perón's fall from power, Pavelić fell out of favour with the Argentine government; Yugoslavia again requested his extradition. Pavelić refused to stay in hospital, even though a bullet was lodged in his spine. Two weeks after the shooting, as the Argentine authorities agreed to grant the Yugoslav government's extradition request, he moved to Chile. He spent four months in Santiago, and then moved to Spain. Reports circulated that Pavelić had fled to Paraguay to work for the Stroessner regime; his Spanish asylum became known only in late 1959.

42 years after the shooting, in 1999, Blagoje Jovović, a hotel owner who had emigrated from Montenegro to Argentina following WW2, claimed shortly before his death to have been behind the shooting. He asserted having tried to assassinate Pavelić multiple times, planning it as early as 1946, when he learned Pavelić was in hiding inside the Vatican. This was broadly covered by the media in Serbia and Montenegro, where he became hailed by many as a folk hero. Jovović claimed to have been a Royal Yugoslav officer who had fought with the Montenegrin Chetniks during the war.

=== Death in Spain ===
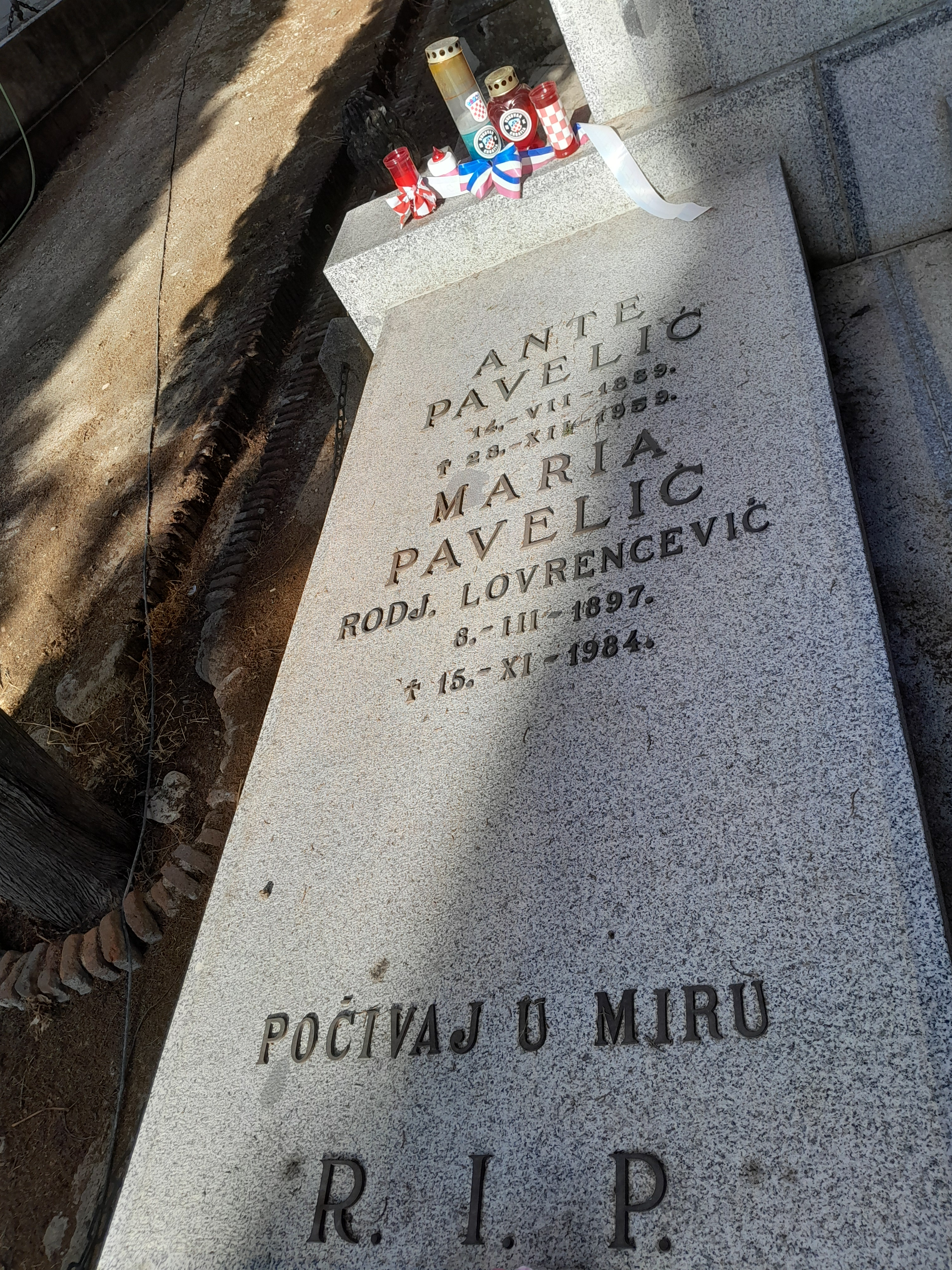
Ante Pavelić's grave on San Isidro Cemetery in Madrid

Pavelić arrived in Madrid on 29 November 1957. He continued contacts with members of the Croatian Liberation Movement and received visitors from around the world. Pavelić lived secretly with his family, probably by agreement with the Spanish authorities. Though he was granted asylum, the Spanish authorities did not allow him public appearances. In the middle of 1958, he sent a message from Madrid to the Assembly of Croatian Societies in Munich.

He expressed his wish that all Croats unite with the goal of re-establishing the Independent State of Croatia. Some groups distanced themselves from Pavelić and others did so after his death. In his will, he named Stjepan Hefer as his successor as the president of the Croatian Liberation Movement. Pavelić died on 28 December 1959 at the Hospital Alemán in Madrid, aged 70, from the wounds he had sustained in the assassination attempt. He was buried in San Isidro Cemetery, Madrid's oldest private burial ground.

== Honours ==
=== National honours ===
- Independent State of Croatia: Military Order of the Iron Trefoil as Head of the Order, special class with cross
- Independent State of Croatia: Order of the Crown of King Zvonimir as Head of the Order, Grand Order star and sash
- Independent State of Croatia: Order of Merit as Head of the Order, Grand Order with star and sash

=== Foreign honours ===
- Kingdom of Italy: Order of Saints Maurice and Lazarus, Knight Grand Cross
- Kingdom of Hungary: Order of Merit of the Kingdom of Hungary, Grand Cross
- Finland: Order of the White Rose of Finland, Grand Cross with sash
- Kingdom of Bulgaria: Order of Saints Cyril and Methodius, Knight Grand Cross
- Kingdom of Romania: Order of Carol I, Knight Grand Cross (7th July 1942)
- Nazi Germany: Order of the German Eagle, Grand Cross in Gold with Star
- Slovak Republic: Order of the Slovak Cross, Grand Cross with sash
- Spain: Imperial Order of the Yoke and Arrows, Knight Grand Collar

== In popular culture ==
- Harry Turtledove's short story Ready for the Fatherland is set in an alternate history where the Independent State of Croatia continues to exist in 1979. Pavelić is revered as the first Poglavnik and his image appears on the State's primary currency, but no further details are shared as to how his life played out in that timeline, which diverged from ours in February 1943.
- In a 2015 Croatian comedy film National Hero Lily Vidić, Pavelić is portrayed by Dražen Čuček. The movie follows a group of Yugoslav partisans, led by a young poet Lily Vidić, who compete in the NDH's fictional talent show "Factor X" whose winner wins the chance to perform at the Pavelić's reception for Hitler. Partisans see it as an opportunity to kill both Hitler and Pavelić, and thus end WWII. In 2017, the movie was adapted into a theatrical play where Pavelić was portrayed by Boris Mirković.

Political offices
Preceded by Office created	Poglavnik of the Independent State of Croatia; 10 April 1941 – 8 May 1945	Succeeded by Office abolished
Preceded by Office created	Prime Minister of the Independent State of Croatia; 10 April 1941 – 2 September 1943	Succeeded by Nikola Mandić
Party political offices
Preceded by Office created	Poglavnik of the Ustaše Movement; 7 January 1929 – 8 May 1945	Succeeded by Office abolished
