= Hrvatski domobran =

Croat political organization

Hrvatski domobran (Croatian Home Guard) was a Croat political organization that advocated independence for Croatia from Yugoslavia, and became associated with the Ustaše. It was founded in 1928 and took part in demonstrations in Zagreb in which it engaged in violent battles with police. After being shut down and forced to flee with the establishment of royal dictatorship in Yugoslavia, it was refounded as an émigré organization in 1933 in Buenos Aires, Argentina. A section was established in the United States to raise support for the Ustaše.
