= Foreign Ministry of the Independent State of Croatia =

Government ministry of Croatia (1941–1945)

- Ministarstvo vanjskih poslova Nezavisne Države Hrvatske
- Flag of Ministers

Foreign Ministry overview
- Formed: 24 June 1941
- Dissolved: 8 May 1945
- Jurisdiction: Government of the Independent State of Croatia
- Headquarters: Zagreb, Independent State of Croatia
- Child agencies: Embassy in Berlin; Embassy in Bratislava; Embassy in Budapest; Embassy in Bucharest; Embassy in Helsinki; Embassy in Madrid; Embassy in Rome; Embassy in Sofia; Consulate in Graz; Consulate in Rijeka; Consulate in Munich; Consular office in Belgrade; Reporting office of the Foreign Ministry

Foreign Ministry of the Independent State of Croatia (Croatian: Ministarstvo vanjskih poslova Nezavisne Države Hrvatske) was a ministry of the Government of the Independent State of Croatia established on a provision on 24 June 1941. This provision also contained determinations of the activity of this ministry.

Members of the ministry were chosen in 1941, while most changes of membership occurred in 1943 with smaller changes in 1944.

== Activity ==
The Foreign Ministry was assigned for all foreign affairs, establishment of agencies aboard, relationship with foreign countries, protection of Croatian interests and its citizens, collecting of political structure and its elaboration, collecting of print data, supervision of information offices, radio stations and press, supervision of the Report Office of the Ministry, tracking of the development of international law, cooperation at conclusion of international contracts, making powers for the signing of international treaties, saving of international contracts and documents, cultural cooperation with foreign countries, visa, international traffic and passengers, immigration and emigration, honor consulates and foreign consular representatives. Territorial jurisdiction of the Foreign Ministry also included Croatian consular offices aboard (embassies and consulates, general consulates, consular offices, social offices, trade delegations, etc.).

== Foreign Ministers ==
No.	Portrait	Name (Born-Died)	Term start	Term end	Notes
1		Ante Pavelić (1889–1956)	16 April 1941	9 June 1941	
2		Mladen Lorković (1909–1945)	9 June 1941	23 April 1943	
3		Mile Budak (1889–1945)	23 April 1943	5 November 1943	
4		Stijepo Perić (1896–1954)	5 November 1943	28 April 1944	
5		Mladen Lorković (1909–1945)	28 April 1944	5 May 1944	
6		Mehmed Alajbegović (1889–1947)	5 May 1944	8 May 1945	
