= Julije Makanec =

Croatian politician, philosopher and writer

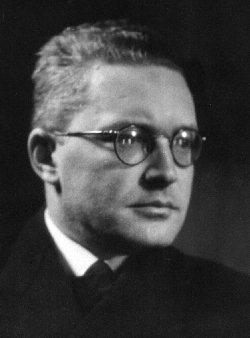

4th Minister of Education of the Independent State of Croatia
- In office 11 October 1943 – 8 May 1945
- Preceded by: Mile Starčević
- Succeeded by: Office abolished

Personal details
- Born: 19 September 1904 Sarajevo, Condominium of Bosnia and Herzegovina, Austria-Hungary
- Died: 7 June 1945 (aged 40) Zagreb, SR Croatia, SFR Yugoslavia
- Cause of death: Execution by firing squad
- Party: Ustaše
- Education: University of Zagreb
- Profession: Teacher

Julije Makanec (19 September 1904 – 7 June 1945) was a Croatian politician, teacher, philosopher and writer. During World War II in Yugoslavia, he was the Minister of Education of the Independent State of Croatia and a high-ranking member of the Ustaše.

== Early life ==
Makanec was born in Sarajevo. He was educated in Osijek and Bihać, and studied philosophy at the University of Zagreb, where he obtained a Ph.D. in 1927. Between 1929 and 1940 he served as a gymnasium professor in Koprivnica, Bjelovar and several other places in Croatia, as well as in Leskovac, Serbia. In November 1940, as a member of the Croatian Peasant Party, he became the mayor of Bjelovar. Here he played an important role in the Bjelovar rebellion of 8 April that year when, after the revolt by Croats in the Royal Yugoslav Army during the early days of invasion of Yugoslavia, he declared the "resurrection of the Croatian state".

== World War II ==
By his own account, Makanec swore the Ustaše oath in April 1941, days after the establishment of the Independent State of Croatia, but historians believe Makanec may have joined the Ustaše much earlier, in late 1939 or early 1940. Shortly after the formation of the Ustaše government he served as adjutant in the Croatian army's Bilogora headquarters, in Bjelovar. From 1942 he was the chief of spiritual upbringing in the Ustaše Youth. In March 1943 he was named extraordinary professor of philosophy at the Faculty of Philosophy in Zagreb. In October 1943 he became the Independent State of Croatia's Minister of National Education. He also wrote books in his field as well as contributing to various periodicals and newspapers.

In a 1942 brochure titled Ustaše Virtues (Ustaške vrline), Makanec openly advocated for genocide. He wrote: "[...] every community has the right to exterminate, destroy, or at least render harmless those individuals who weaken it and bring it to ruin due to their utter lack of virtue."

On 6 May 1945, shortly before Yugoslav Partisans entered Zagreb, Makanec fled the city in a group of sixteen government ministers. On 17 May, they surrendered to the British in Tamsweg, Austria, and were extradited to Yugoslav authorities. After a one-day trial before a military tribunal in Zagreb on 6 June he was sentenced to death for high treason and war crimes and executed by firing squad in the morning of the following day.

== Legacy ==
A street in Bjelovar bears Makanec's name. In 2016, a controversy erupted in Croatia when it was reported that the country's Minister of Science and Education, Pavo Barišić, had written a paper in 1992 praising Makanec's contributions to the field of philosophy without mentioning the war crimes with which he was associated. Barišić wrote that when Makanec was executed by the Partisans in 1945, he "joined the parade of Croatian martyrs", and described him as "a tragic hero and a victim". The paper prompted the philosophy professor Josip Talanga to resign from the editorial team of the journal that had published it. In 1993, Barišić edited a compilation of Makanec's lectures in which he again did not mention the atrocities committed by the NDH.

== Works ==
Books:

- Marksistička filozofija prirode (Zagreb, 1938)
- O podrijetlu i smislu države (Zagreb, 1939)
- Poglavnik o boljševizmu (Zagreb, 1942)
- Ustaške vrline (Zagreb, 1942)
- Veliko raskršće (Zagreb, 1942)
- Razvoj državne misli od Platona do Hegela (Zagreb, 1943)
- Hrvatski vidici (Zagreb, 1944)

== Sources ==
- Jakovina, Tvrtko (3 November 2016). "Ovako je zborio ustaški ministar kojem se divi Pavo Barišić: 'Ustaški pokret istrijebit će i uništiti nepoželjne elemente!'". Globus (in Croatian). No. 1345.
- Karaula, Željko; Miškulin, Ivica (December 2014). "Jedan prilog za političku biografiju. Zapisnik sa saslušanja dr. Julija Makaneca od 26. svibnja 1945. godine" [A Contribution to a Political Biography. A Protocol from a Hearing of Dr Julije Makanec, on 26 May 1945] (PDF). Cris (in Croatian). XVI (1): 77–85.
- Macut, Ivan (2016). "Filozofske teme i filozofi u tjedniku Spremnost (1942. – 1945.)" (PDF). Služba Božja (in Croatian). 56 (2–3–4): 159–188.
- Macut, Petar (2013). Roksandić, Drago; Cvijović Javorina, Ivana (eds.). "Julije Makanec kao duhovni odgojitelj Ustaške mladeži" [Julije Makanec as a spiritual educator of the Ustashe Youth] (PDF). Intelektualci I Rat 1939.–1947. Desničini susreti (in Croatian). 8 (1). Faculty of Humanities and Social Sciences, University of Zagreb: 147–161.
- Milekic, Sven (28 October 2016). "Croatian Minister Praised WWII Fascist Official". Balkan Insight.
- Vladisavljevic, Anja (9 April 2021). "Croatian Street Names Still Bear Names of WWII Fascists". Balkan Insight.
- Yeomans, Rory (2013). Visions of Annihilation: The Ustasha Regime and the Cultural Politics of Fascism, 1941-1945. University of Pittsburgh Press. ISBN 978-0-8229-6192-5.
