= Nikola Mandić =

Croatian politician

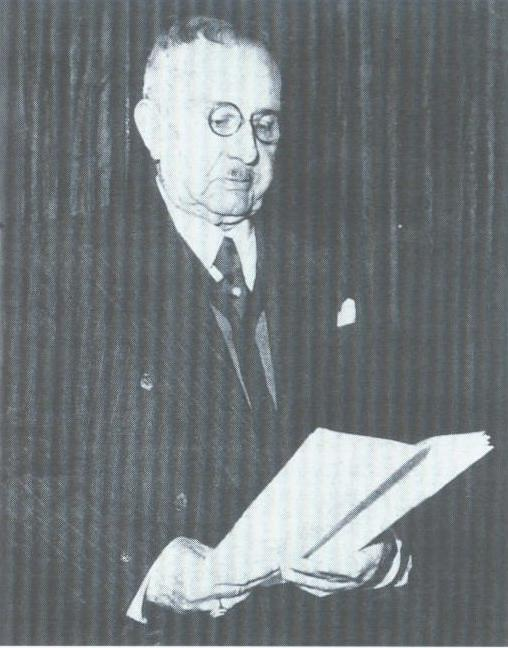
- Mandić in 1940

2nd Prime Minister of the Independent State of Croatia
- In office 2 September 1943 – 8 May 1945
- Poglavnik: Ante Pavelić
- Preceded by: Ante Pavelić
- Succeeded by: Office abolished

4th President of the Diet of Bosnia
- In office 1912 – 9 July 1914
- Preceded by: Safvet-beg Bašagić
- Succeeded by: Office abolished

Personal details
- Born: 20 January 1869 Travnik, Ottoman Empire
- Died: 7 June 1945 (aged 76) Zagreb, SR Croatia, Democratic Federal Yugoslavia
- Party: Croat National Union (1910–1919); Croatian Popular Party (1919–1929); Ustaše (1929–1945)
- Education: University of Vienna
- Profession: Lawyer, politician

Nikola Mandić (pronounced [nǐkola mǎnditɕ]; 20 January 1869 – 7 June 1945) was a Croatian politician and one of the leading political figures in Bosnia and Herzegovina under Austrian-Hungarian rule. He also served as a Prime Minister of the Independent State of Croatia (NDH) during World War II. He was executed by the Yugoslav Partisans as a war criminal on 7 June 1945.

== Early life ==
Nikola Mandić was born in the town of Travnik on 20 January 1869, to a Bosnian Croat family. He finished gymnasium in Sarajevo and went on to study law at the University of Vienna, where he received a doctorate in law in 1894. Mandić returned to Sarajevo and worked as a judicial clerk before becoming an attorney.

== Political career ==
=== Austria-Hungary ===
In the early 1900s, Mandić became one of the most influential Croat politicians in Bosnia and Herzegovina. In 1907, he and other Croat politicians founded a political party known as the Croat People's Union (Croatian: Hrvatska narodna zajednica, HNZ). The party received approval from Austria-Hungary in November 1907, and Mandić was elected party leader at its founding assembly in February 1908. At the time, he was serving as deputy mayor of Sarajevo.

On 6 October 1908, Austria-Hungary officially annexed Bosnia and Herzegovina. Mandić unconditionally supported the move, reasoning that the annexation would make it easier for the two regions to later be united with the nominally autonomous Kingdom of Croatia-Slavonia. He also believed that Bosnia and Herzegovina should receive the status of "empire's land", ruled jointly by both Austria and the Kingdom of Hungary.

Mandić became a member of the Diet of Bosnia (Bosanski sabor) in 1910, representing the HNZ. He was elected Speaker of the Diet in 1911 and, in 1914, he was named vice-governor of Bosnia and Herzegovina by decree of Emperor Franz Joseph. Mandić was also the founder and first president of the Croatian Central Bank (Hrvatska centralna banka, HCB), as well as its subsidiary, the Agricultural Bank of Sarajevo (Poljoprivredna banka u Sarajevu, PBS). He also founded a Croatian choir called "Trebević". In 1916, he became a real privy councilor. Mandić remained a member of the Bosnian Diet until Austria-Hungary's dissolution in November 1918.

=== Kingdom of Yugoslavia ===
Following the establishment of the Kingdom of Serbs, Croats and Slovenes, Mandić was chosen to become a deputy in the National Assembly, but never took office because prominent Serbian politicians vetoed his appointment.

In 1920, Mandić was appointed to the constituent assembly of the Kingdom of Serbs, Croats and Slovenes, representing the Croatian Popular Party (Hrvatska pučka stranka). At the assembly, he became notable as an advocate of Croatian, as opposed to Yugoslav, political aims. He expressed his opposition to King Alexander's Vidovdan Constitution and voted against it on 28 June 1921, when it was passed with 223 voted for, 35 voted against and 161 abstained. Disappointed by the outcome of the vote, Mandić tendered his resignation from the assembly.

=== Independent State of Croatia ===
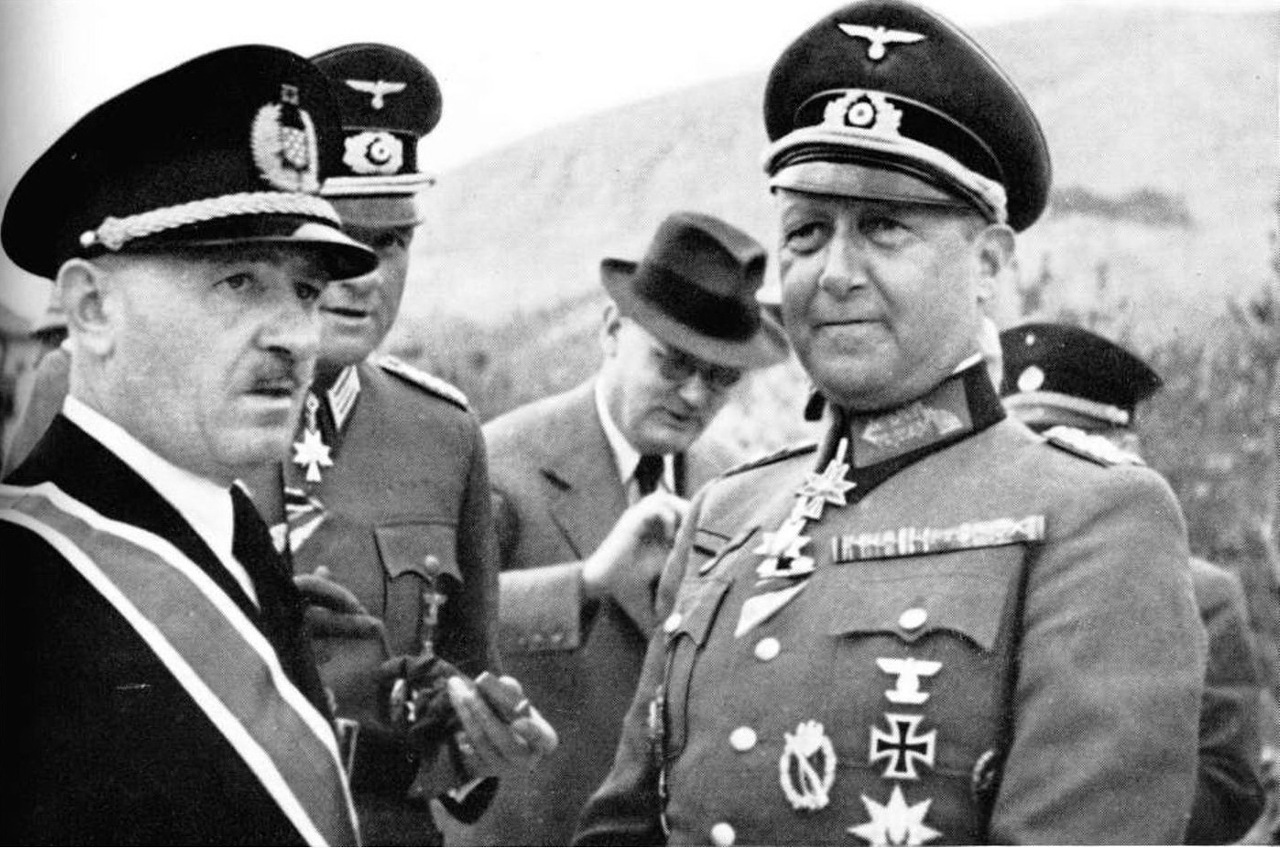
Nikola Mandić with Brigadier General Fritz Neidholt, the commander of the 369th (Croatian) Infantry Division, known as the Devil's Division.

Mandić was living as a retired government functionary at the time the Independent State of Croatia (Nezavisna Država Hrvatska, NDH) was declared. He worked as an attorney and served as president of the Sarajevo Chamber of Attorneys until September 1943. On 2 September 1943, Poglavnik Ante Pavelić offered Mandić the post of Prime Minister of the Independent State of Croatia. Mandić accepted the offer. His appointment was met with mixed feelings, and infuriated politicians such as Mladen Lorković, Mile Starčević and Vladimir Košak, some of whom threatened to resign due to the decision. They brought up Mandić's age and questioned whether he would be able to serve to the best of his ability.

Immediately, Mandić became involved in discussions with the Croatian Peasant Party (Croatian: Hrvatska seljačka stranka, HSS) regarding the composition and character of the Government of the Independent State of Croatia. He advocated the creation of a coalition government, while prominent HSS member August Košutić voiced support for a clerical, partisan one which distanced the Ustaše from Croatian state politics. The discussions ended in late September 1943, with no political compromise reached.

On 1 March 1944, Mandić and Croatian Foreign Minister Stijepo Perić visited Adolf Hitler at the Schloss Klessheim, a Baroque palace located 4 km (2.5 mi) west of Salzburg. German Foreign Minister Joachim von Ribbentrop was also in attendance. At the meeting, Hitler stressed that he considered Croatia an ally and partner and maintained that Serbia was merely a conquered state, stating: "[the] Serbs will never be [Germany's] friends". Mandić and Perić complained to Hitler that the staff officers of the 13th Waffen Mountain Division of the SS Handschar (1st Croatian) were promoting the autonomy of Bosnia and Herzegovina. Hitler disagreed with Mandić's assessment of the division, but later reached a compromise with Muslim autonomists whereby the division would remain in Bosnia and be used to defend its Muslim population. In return, the autonomists promised Hitler that they would support Bosnia and Herzegovina's integration into the NDH.

Mandić led an NDH government delegation to Sarajevo in late April 1944. There, he was presented with a memorandum documenting the persecution of Muslims by the Ustaše. Croatian politicians quickly condemned the memorandum, calling it "one of the greatest Muslim assaults...on the sovereignty and unity of the NDH." In March 1945, Mandić called for NDH citizens of all ethnicities to voice their thoughts on the Ustaše, the war and the communist Yugoslav Partisans. With his backing, the NDH drafted a memorandum to British Field Marshal Harold Alexander, Commander-in-Chief Middle East and commander of the 18th Army Group in Tunisia, expressing a desire to defect to the Allies in the wake of Hitler's death. The memorandum was ignored.

Together with the rest of the Croatian government, Mandić left Zagreb on 8 May 1945 in the Independent State of Croatia evacuation to Austria. He surrendered to the British on 15 May and demanded political asylum. The British ignored his requests and handed him over to the Partisans three days later, on 18 May. Mandić was charged with various war crimes and put before a military tribunal in Zagreb. Mandić was convicted and sentenced to death on 6 June 1945. His execution was carried out the following day.

== See also ==
- Villa Mandić (Sarajevo)
