= Kruščica concentration camp =

Concentration camp run by the Ustaše during World War II

Coordinates: 44°7′22.44″N 17°46′44.82″E

Kruščica
- Concentration camp
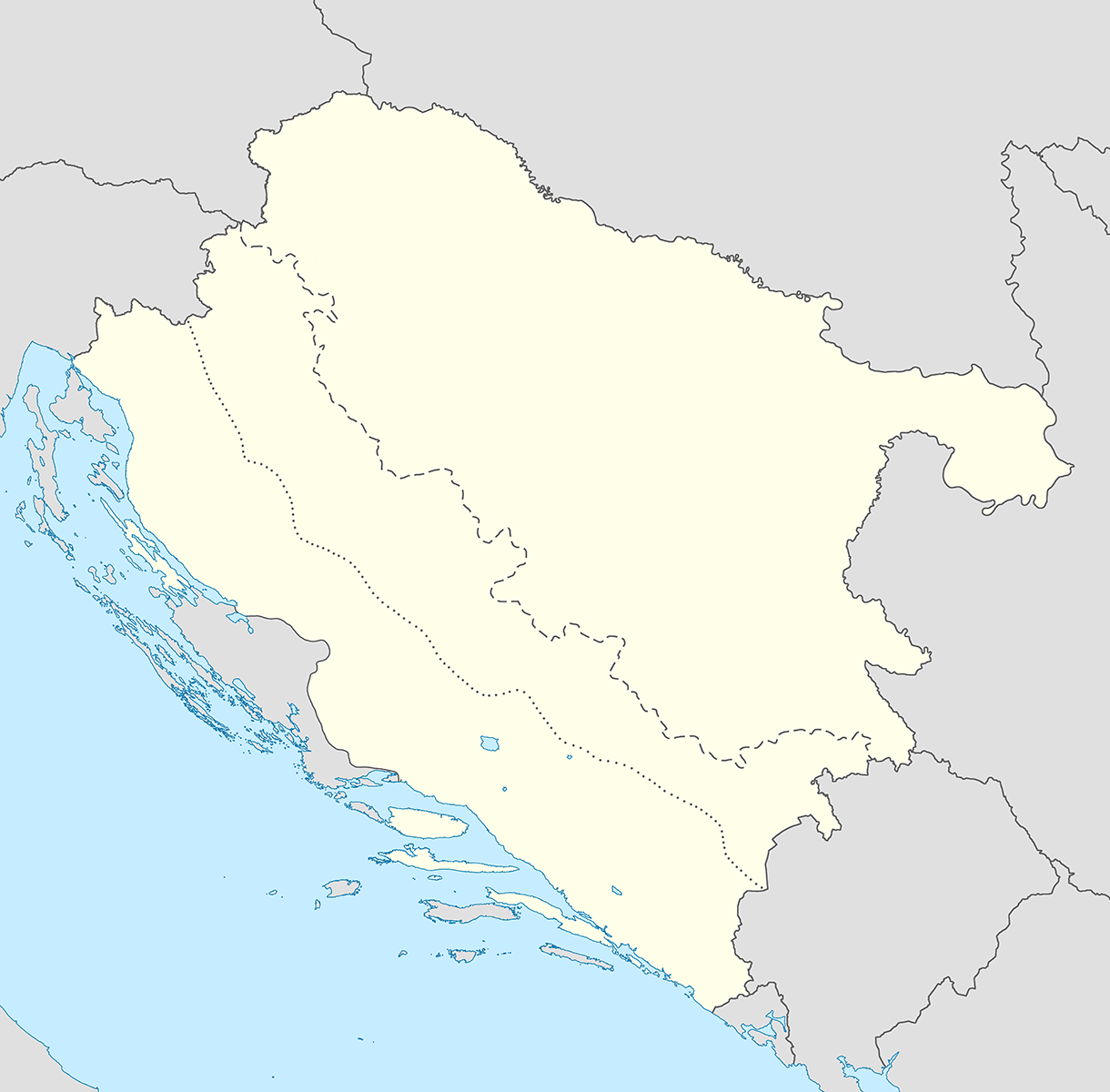
- Location of Kruščica in the Independent State of Croatia
- Location: Kruščica, Vitez, Independent State of Croatia
- Operated by: Ustaše
- Original use: Private estate, detention site
- Operational: August 1941 – 5 October 1941
- Inmates: Jews and Serbs
- Number of inmates: ~5,000
- Killed: 3,000

Kruščica was a concentration camp established and operated by the fascist, Croatian nationalist Ustaše movement near the town of Vitez, in the Independent State of Croatia (NDH), between August and October 1941, during World War II.

The camp's establishment was ordered by Vjekoslav Luburić, the head of the NDH's system of concentration camps, in July 1941. Prior to the establishment of the NDH, Kruščica had been used to detain members of the Ustaše movement. The first transport of 1,100 Jewish women and children arrived from Gospić on 28 August via Slavonski Brod. On 3 September, around 500 Jewish men, women, and children from Sarajevo arrived at Kruščica, followed by an additional 500 six days later. The prisoners were forced to live in semi-finished barracks, half with no floors, in poor sanitary conditions which resulted in the spread of lice among most of the camp's population. The inmates were given a ladle of bean soup each day and soon resorted to eating grass and pumpkin leaves to survive. On 1 October, 250 Jewish males were deported from Kruščica to Jasenovac. Between 5 and 7 October, 1,200 Jewish women and children, as well as 170 Serb women and children, were deported to Loborgrad. The Kruščica camp was subsequently dissolved.

Up to 5,000 inmates passed through the Kruščica camp over the course of its existence and as many as 3,000 lost their lives. Following the war, the campsite was converted into a memorial area, which included a museum, a monument and several commemorative plaques. During the Bosnian War, the museum's contents were removed. In 2014, the site was declared a National Monument of Bosnia and Herzegovina.

== Background ==
=== Interwar Yugoslavia ===
Ethnic tensions between Serbs and Croats increased following the establishment of the Kingdom of Serbs, Croats and Slovenes in the aftermath of World War I. During the interwar period, many Croats came to resent Serb political hegemony in the newly established state, which resulted in the passing of legislation that favoured Serb political, religious and business interests. Tensions flared in 1928, following the shooting of five Croatian parliamentary deputies by the Montenegrin Serb politician Puniša Račić. Two died on the spot and two others were wounded but survived. A fifth, the opposition leader Stjepan Radić, was also wounded and died nearly two months later of complications attributed to the shooting. In January 1929, King Alexander instituted a royal dictatorship and renamed the country Yugoslavia. Shortly thereafter, the Croatian politician Ante Pavelić formed the Ustaše, a Croatian nationalist and fascist movement which sought to achieve Croatian independence through violent means. The Ustaše were outlawed in Yugoslavia, but received covert assistance from Benito Mussolini's Italy, which had territorial pretensions in Istria and Dalmatia. The Ustaše carried out a number of actions aimed at undermining Yugoslavia, most notably the Velebit uprising in 1932 and the assassination of King Alexander in Marseille in 1934. Following Alexander's assassination, the Ustaše movement's seniormost leaders, including Pavelić, were tried in absentia in both France and Yugoslavia and sentenced to death, but were granted protection by Mussolini and thus evaded capture.

Following the Anschluss of March 1938, during which Germany annexed Austria, Yugoslavia came to share its northwestern border with Germany and fell under increasing pressure as its neighbours aligned themselves with the Axis powers. In April 1939, Italy invaded and occupied Albania, thereby establishing a second land border with Yugoslavia. At the outbreak of World War II, the Royal Yugoslav Government declared its neutrality. Between September and November 1940, Hungary and Romania joined the Tripartite Pact, aligning themselves with the Axis, and Italy invaded Greece. Yugoslavia was by then almost completely surrounded by the Axis powers and their satellites, and its neutral stance toward the war became strained. In late February 1941, Bulgaria joined the Pact. The following day, German troops entered Bulgaria from Romania, closing the ring around Yugoslavia. Intending to secure his southern flank for the impending attack on the Soviet Union, German dictator Adolf Hitler began placing heavy pressure on Yugoslavia to join the Axis. On 25 March 1941, after some delay, the Royal Yugoslav Government signed the Pact. Two days later, a group of pro-Western, Serbian nationalist Royal Yugoslav Air Force officers deposed the country's regent, Prince Paul, in a bloodless coup d'état. They placed his teenage nephew Peter on the throne and brought to power an ostensible government of national unity led by the head of the Royal Yugoslav Air Force, General Dušan Simović. The coup enraged Hitler, who wished to irrevocably dismantle Yugoslavia, which he dubbed a "Versailles construct". He thus immediately ordered Yugoslavia's invasion, which commenced on 6 April.

=== Creation of the NDH ===
A map depicting the occupation and partition of Yugoslavia, 1941–1943

Yugoslavia was quickly overwhelmed by the combined strength of the Axis powers and surrendered in less than two weeks. The government and royal family went into exile, and the country was occupied and dismembered by its neighbours. Serbia was reduced to its pre-Balkan War borders and directly occupied by Germany. Serb-inhabited territories west of the Drina River were incorporated into the Axis puppet state known as the Independent State of Croatia (Croatian: Nezavisna država Hrvatska; NDH), which included most of modern-day Croatia, all of modern-day Bosnia and Herzegovina, and parts of modern-day Serbia. (Note: The NDH was divided into German and Italian areas of influence. The Italian area of influence was divided into three operational zones. Zone I, which consisted of the coastal and island area surrounding the cities of Zadar, Šibenik, Trogir and Split, was directly annexed by Italy. Zone II was consigned to the NDH. It encompassed much of Dalmatia and the Dalmatian Hinterland. Zone III, also allotted to the NDH, extended as far as western and central Bosnia, a sliver of eastern Bosnia, and all of Herzegovina.) The establishment of the NDH was announced over the radio by Slavko Kvaternik, a former Austro-Hungarian Army officer who had been in contact with Croatian nationalists abroad, on 10 April.

Pavelić entered the NDH on 13 April and reached Zagreb two days later. The same day, Germany and Italy extended diplomatic recognition to the NDH. Pavelić assumed control and bestowed himself the title Poglavnik ("leader"). (Note: The following month, representatives of Italy and the NDH signed the Treaties of Rome. Under the terms of the treaties, the NDH ceded large swathes of Dalmatia to Italy and agreed to a member of the House of Savoy being named King of Croatia.) At the time of its establishment, the NDH had a population of 6.5 million inhabitants, about half of whom were Croats. It was also inhabited by nearly two million Serbs, who constituted about one-third of its total population. Nevertheless, Serbs—along with others whom the Ustaše deemed "undesirable", such as Jews and Roma—were denied citizenship on the basis that they were not Aryans, and immediate measures were taken to expunge the presence of the Cyrillic alphabet from the public sphere. On 17 April, the Ustaše instituted the Legal Provision for the Defence of the People and State, a law legitimizing the establishment of concentration camps and the mass shooting of hostages in the NDH. Thirty concentration camps in total were established across the puppet state.

== Operation ==
=== Establishment ===
In July 1941, Vjekoslav Luburić, the head of Bureau III of the Ustaše Surveillance Service (Croatian: Ustaška nadzorna služba; UNS), ordered the Ustaše commissioner for Bosnia-Herzegovina, Jure Francetić, to establish a camp for Jews and Serbs at the dilapidated Gutman family estate in the village of Kruščica, near Vitez, about 56 kilometres (35 mi) northwest of Sarajevo. Because the camps at Gospić, Jadovno and Pag Island had been closed down, and camps such as Jasenovac, Đakovo and Loborgrad had not yet become operational, Kruščica was intended as a temporary transit point. Between 1939 and 1941, the property had been used as a detention site for Ustaše prisoners who had previously been interned at the Lepoglava prison, near Varaždin. Notable members of the Ustaše movement who were imprisoned at Kruščica included future NDH government minister Mladen Lorković and the writer Marko Došen. Upon their arrival, the prisoners were greeted by an angry crowd demanding their release and shouting, "long live the Ustaše movement!" On 5 April 1941, the Ustaše imprisoned at Kruščica successfully escaped. Luburić appointed Francetić’s deputy, First Lieutenant (Croatian: Nadporučnik) Josip Gesler, as the camp's first commander. Under Gesler's orders, seventy-five Serb prisoners from the town of Pale were ordered to renovate the Gutman estate and erect a barbed-wire fence around the property.

The camp was guarded by the 17th Ustaše Company. The first twenty-three inmates – peasants and labourers from Željecare, as well as communists from Zenica – arrived at Kruščica in early August 1941. Among them were two Croats and one Bosnian Muslim. Gesler personally killed multiple inmates, often simply to steal their belongings, mainly their clothes. The detention of the two Croats and the Bosnian Muslim prompted Marjan Čilić, a policeman from Travnik, to open an investigation. Upon hearing the news, Gesler shot and killed one of the inmates. The night that Čilić's investigation began, the prisoners made an escape attempt. Seventeen were killed by Gesler and the camp guards. During the upheaval, one of the camp guards accidentally shot and killed Gesler. First Lieutenant Mate Mandušić was then appointed as his successor. An additional sixty men from the 13th Ustaše Battalion were subsequently dispatched from Travnik and Vitez. The seventy-five prisoners who had originally constructed the camp were then killed and buried in a lime pit. Mandušić earned a reputation for sadism.

=== Camp conditions ===
On 28 August, the first transport of 1,100 Jewish women and children arrived from Gospić via Slavonski Brod. At 3:00 a.m. on 3 September, the Ustaše raided the apartments of 500 Sarajevan Jews, and gave them thirty minutes to gather their belongings and assemble on the street. Under police escort, these Jews were taken to Sarajevo's main railway station and forced into cattle cars. They were subsequently taken to Kruščica. Their departure was followed by the frantic looting of their apartments. On 8 September, similar raids were conducted on the apartments of another 500 Sarajevan Jews. This group was also dispatched to Kruščica. On 15 September, two representatives of the Jewish community were permitted to visit Kruščica. They reported that the camp held around 3,000 detainees, including 300 Serbs, but failed to mention whether they were rounded up separately or together with the Jews. The inmates told the representatives they were not given any food until their fourth day at the camp.

Nikola Tusun, an Ustaše official from Travnik, estimated that by mid-September Kruščica held 1,539 prisoners. The historian Jens Hoppe believes this figure is "most likely too low", and suggests the camp held at least 3,000 inmates at this time, mostly Jewish women, but also around 300 Serb women from Herzegovina. "Conditions at Kruščica were perhaps even more frightful than at Jasenovac," the historian Yehuda Bauer writes. The prisoners were forced to live in semi-finished barracks, half with no floors, in poor sanitary conditions which resulted in the spread of lice among a majority of the inmates. The inmates were given a ladle of bean soup each day and soon resorted to eating grass and pumpkin leaves to survive. "Malnourishment rendered them hollow-eyed," the physician Janko Pajas remarked. "Their skin was peeling off, their hair was falling out, and they had loose teeth." The Jewish community in Sarajevo sent food to the camp, but it is unlikely that any of it reached the prisoners. Zagreb's Jewish community also sent about twenty crates of food, but this was likewise never distributed among the inmates. By some accounts, the Ustaše burned these food parcels before the eyes of the emaciated inmates, who were unable to retrieve anything. Sexual harassment and rape were common. Although the camp commander prohibited the guards from entering the women's quarters, they paid no heed.

The local inhabitants were aware of the camp's existence and the atrocious conditions to which its inmates were subjected. Some even complained to the local authorities, to no avail. In one instance, an Italian diplomatic delegation visited the camp to uncover if it contained any Italian citizens, who would be eligible for their protection. In late September or early October, some of the camp's Serb prisoners were killed in Smrikama, near Travnik.

=== Dissolution ===
On 1 October, 250 male prisoners were transferred from Kruščica to Jasenovac. These were Jewish males over the age of eleven. Between 5 and 7 October, 1,200 Jewish women and children, as well as 170 Serb women and children, were deported to Loborgrad. The Kruščica camp was subsequently dissolved. By some accounts, as many as 5,000 detainees had passed through the camp by the time of its dissolution, 90 percent of whom were Jewish. The historian Francine Friedman places the number of deaths at the camp at 3,000. Around 25,000 Jews were killed in the NDH during the Holocaust, according to Yad Vashem.

== Legacy ==
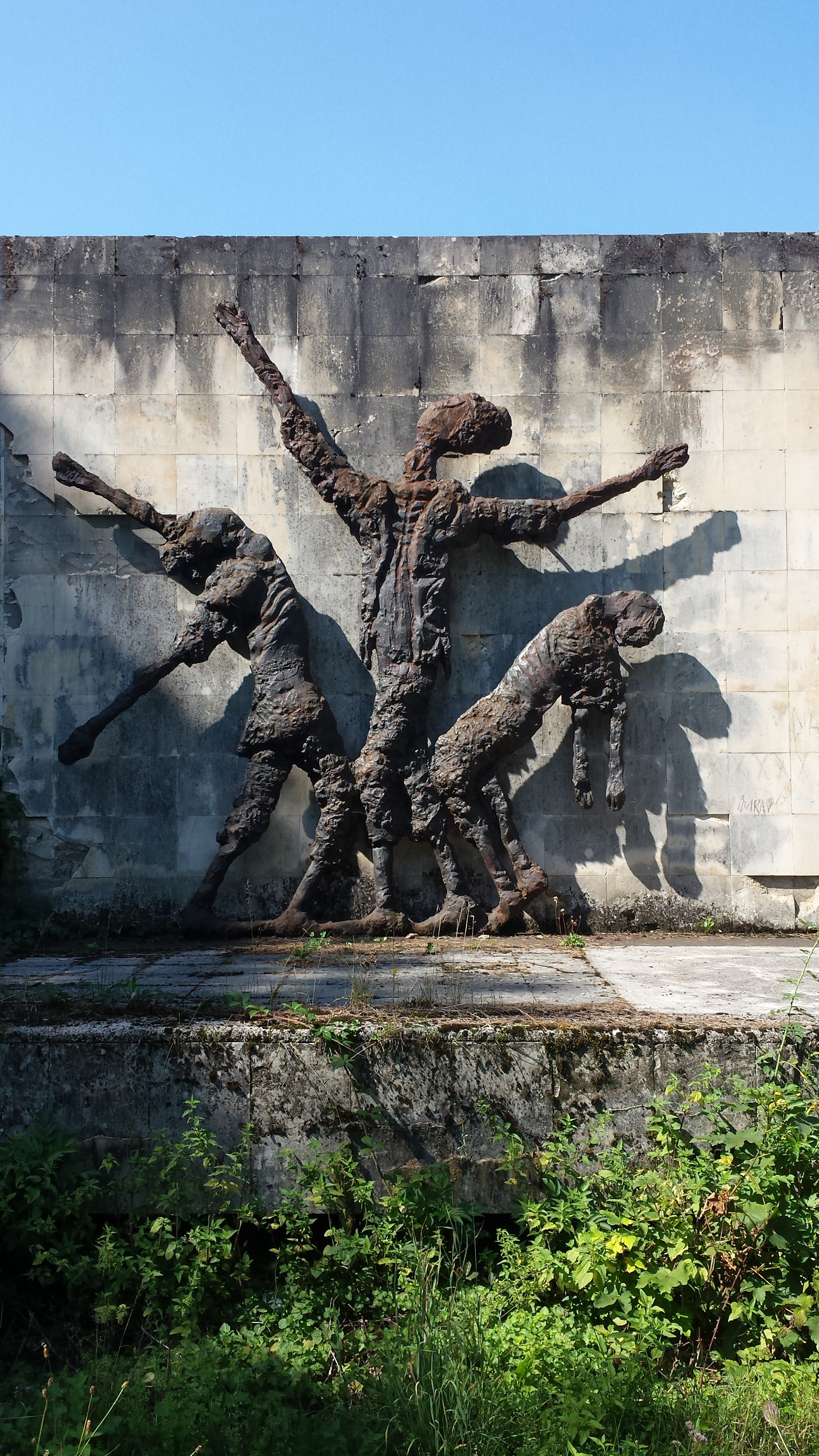
A monument at the campsite, created by Fadil Bilić

Following World War II, one of the camp's buildings was restored and converted into a museum, which became known as the Black House (Serbo-Croatian: Crna kuća, Serbo-Croatian Cyrillic: Црна кућа). A memorial area, occupying around 2,000 square metres (22,000 sq ft) has been established, consisting of the museum, a monument created by Fadil Bilić, incorporating several lines from Ivan Goran Kovačić's poem Jama (transl. The Pit), and several memorial plaques commemorating those that had been detained at the camp. During the Bosnian War, the museum's contents were removed. On 20 June 2014, the site was declared a National Monument of Bosnia and Herzegovina.
