= D534 road =

Road in Croatia

D534 state road

Route information
- Length: 2.4 km (1.5 mi)

Major junctions
- From: D25 and D50 in Budak
- To: A1 in Gospić interchange

Location
- Country: Croatia
- Counties: Lika-Senj
- Major cities: Gospić, Lički Osik

Highway system
- Highways in Croatia

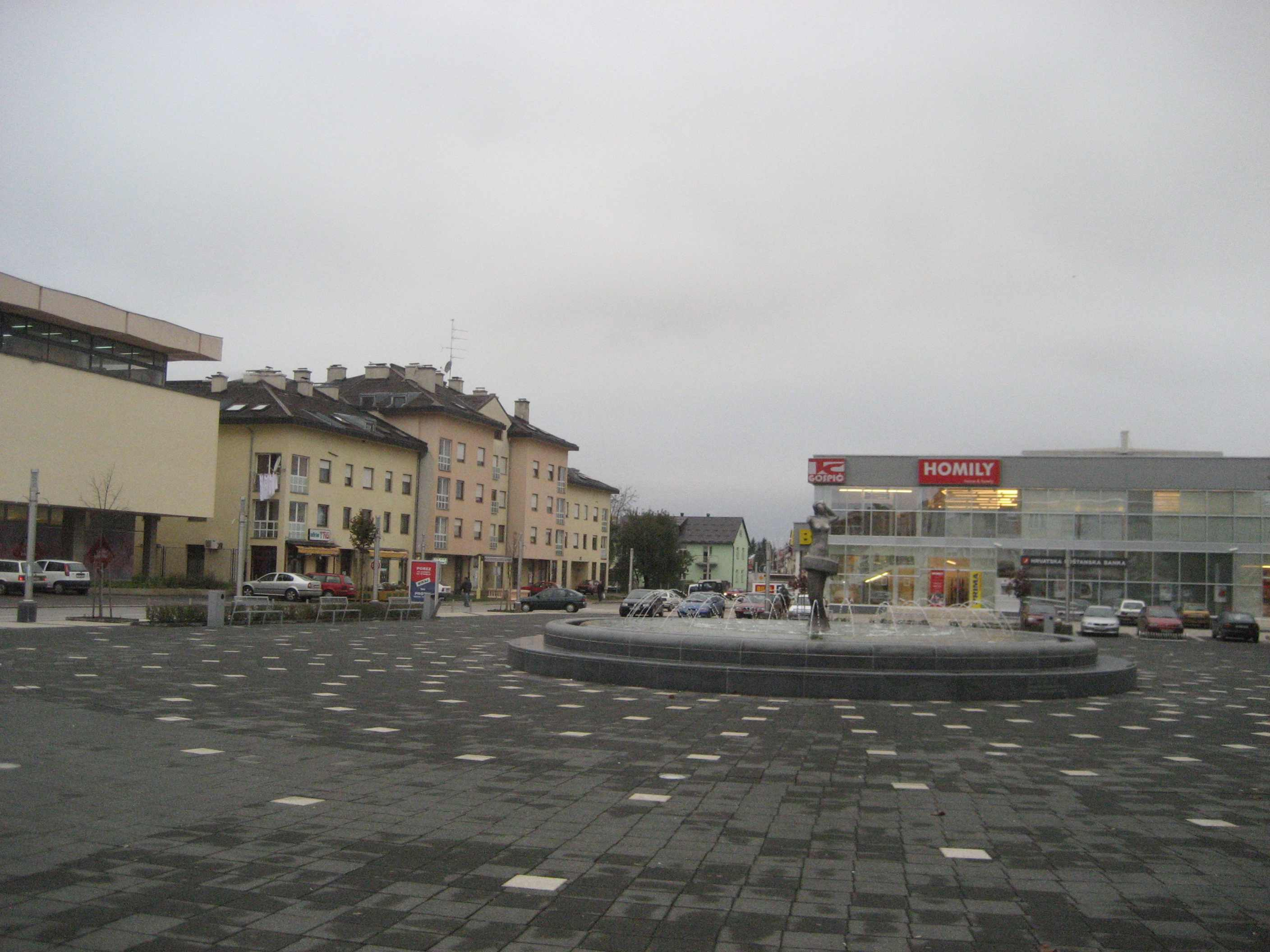
Gospić, near the starting terminus of D534

D534 connects A1 motorway Gospić interchange to Gospić and Lički Osik via D25 and D50 state roads, which are concurrent between Gospić and Lički Osik, where the starting terminus of the D534 road is located. The road is 2.4 km (1.5 mi) long.

The road, as well as all other state roads in Croatia, is managed and maintained by Hrvatske ceste, a state-owned company.

== Traffic volume ==
The D534 state road traffic volume is not reported by Hrvatske ceste. However, they regularly count and report traffic volume on the A1 motorway Gospić interchange, which connects to the D534 road only, thus permitting the D534 road traffic volume to be accurately calculated. The report includes no information on ASDT volumes.

D534 traffic volume
| Road | Counting site | AADT | ASDT | Notes |
| A1 | Gospić interchange | 299 | n/a | Southbound A1 traffic leaving the motorway at the interchange. |
| A1 | Gospić interchange | 201 | n/a | Southbound A1 traffic entering the motorway at the interchange. |
| A1 | Gospić interchange | 201 | n/a | Northbound A1 traffic leaving the motorway at the interchange. |
| A1 | Gospić interchange | 296 | n/a | Northbound A1 traffic entering the motorway at the interchange. |
| D534 | Gospić interchange | 997 | n/a | Total traffic entering/leaving the A1 motorway from/to D534. |

== Road junctions and populated areas ==
D534 junctions/populated areas
| Type | Slip roads/Notes |
| | Budak; D25 and D50 to Gospić (to the south) and Lički Osik (to the north). The western terminus of the road. |
| | A1 in Gospić interchange, to Zagreb (to the north) and to Zadar and Split (to the south). The eastern terminus of the road. |
