= Đakovo internment camp =

Internment camp run by the Ustaše in Croatia during World War II

Coordinates: 45.318063°N 18.417604°E

Đakovo
- Internment camp
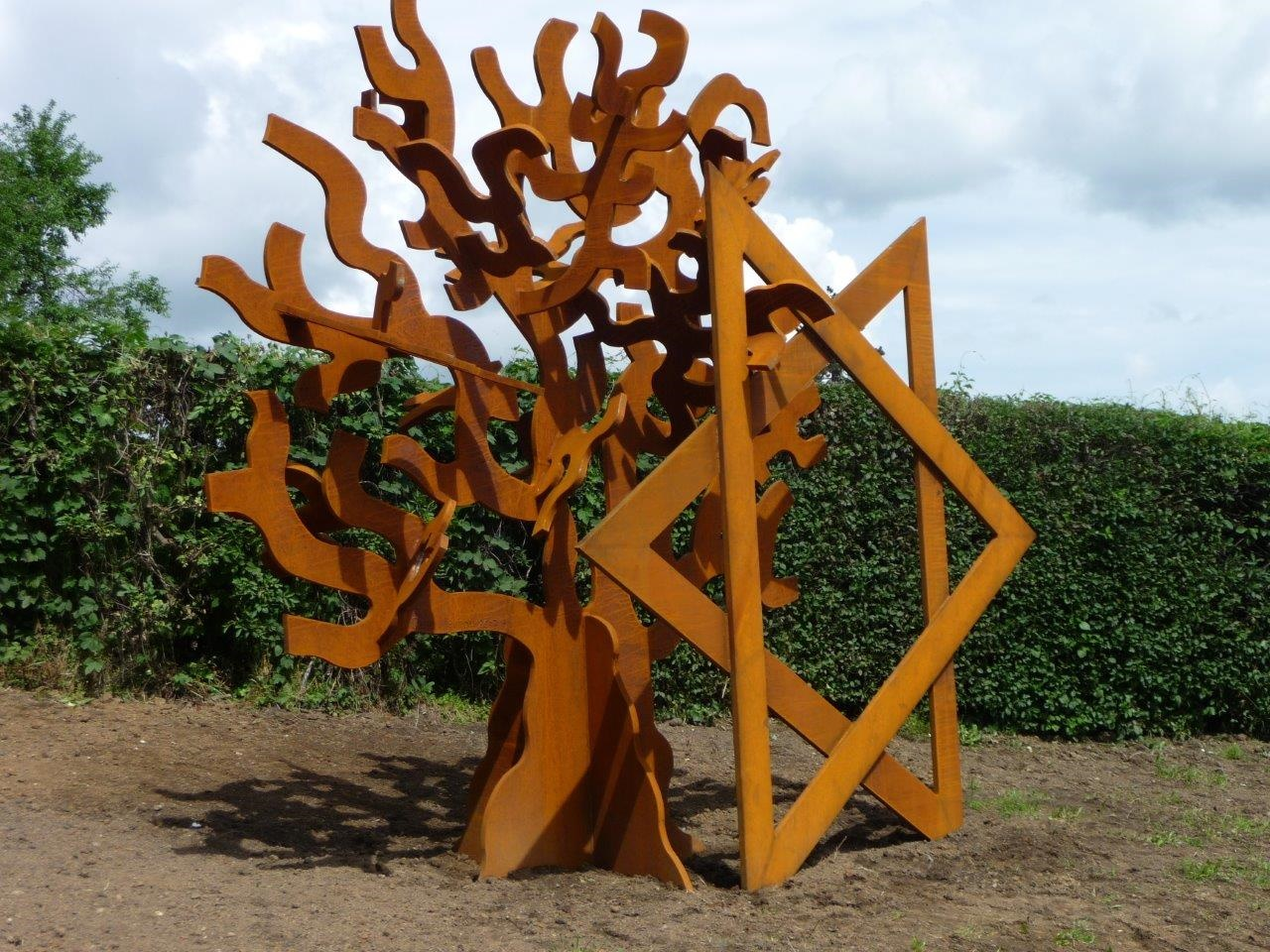
- The Peace in Heaven monument, by Dina Merhav, commemorates those who were interned at Đakovo

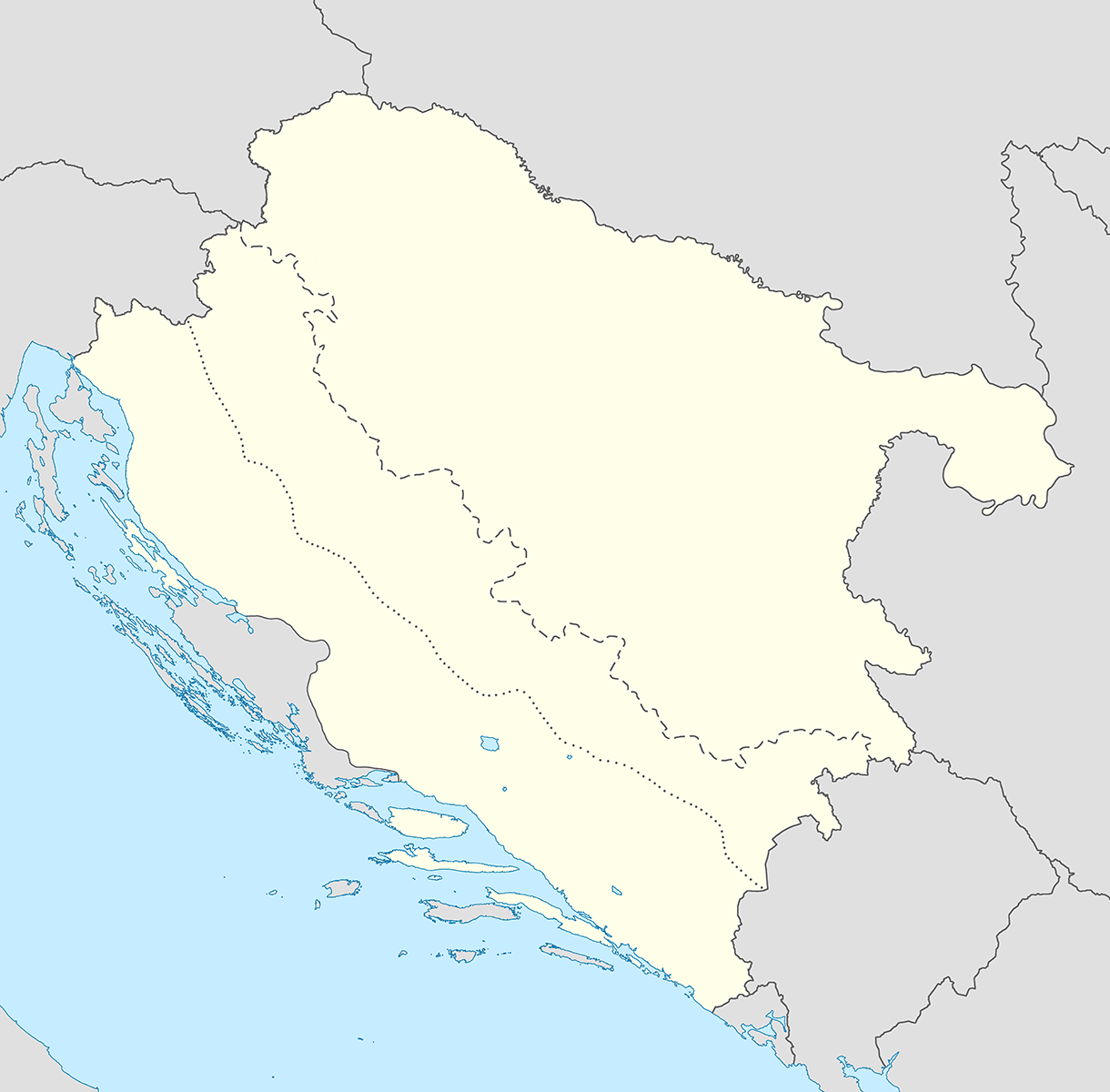
- Location of Đakovo in the Independent State of Croatia
- Location: Đakovo, Independent State of Croatia (modern-day Croatia)
- Operated by: Camp detainees (1941–1942), Ustaše (1942)
- Original use: Flour mill
- Operational: 2 December 1941 – 7 July 1942
- Inmates: Jewish and Serb women and children
- Number of inmates: ~3,800
- Killed: 569–800

Đakovo was an internment camp for Jewish, and to a lesser extent Serb, women and children in the town of Đakovo in the Independent State of Croatia (NDH) that was operational between December 1941 and July 1942, during World War II.

The camp was established on the site of an abandoned flour mill that was once used by the Roman Catholic Archdiocese of Đakovo-Osijek and was initially run autonomously by the Jewish community. It received its first arrivals on 2 December 1941. In early 1942, the camp experienced an outbreak of typhoid fever which was exacerbated by the arrival of Jewish deportees from Slovenia. The NDH's ruling Ustaše movement subsequently assumed direct control of the camp and many detainees were consequently subjected to torture, rape and degradation. In mid-May, the NDH's Ministry of Health ordered that the camp be shut down. Between 15 June and 7 July 1942, 2,400–3,200 detainees were transported to the Jasenovac concentration camp, where they perished. As many as 3,800 women and children were interned at the camp over the course of its existence, and at least 569 women and children died, although this figure may have been as high as 800.

In 1945, Yugoslavia's new communist authorities undertook exhumations on the Đakovo camp's former grounds. In September 1952, the Union of Jewish Communities of Yugoslavia unveiled a monument to the victims of the camp. Following Croatia's independence from Yugoslavia, the site of the former camp was turned into a gas station. A commemorative ceremony is held every year at the site, as well as at a nearby cemetery where the bodies of detainees were buried. The cemetery is unique in that it is the only burial site in Europe where victims of the Holocaust were interred under their first and last names and not merely their inmate numbers. In 2013, a sculpture titled Peace in Heaven, by Croatian-born Israeli sculptor Dina Merhav, was unveiled in Đakovo to commemorate those who were interned at the camp.

== Background ==
=== Interwar Yugoslavia ===
Ethnic tensions between Serbs and Croats increased following the establishment of the Kingdom of Serbs, Croats and Slovenes in the aftermath of World War I. During the interwar period, many Croats came to resent Serb political hegemony in the newly established state, which resulted in the passing of legislation that favoured Serb political, religious and business interests. Tensions flared in 1928, following the shooting of five Croatian parliamentary deputies by the Montenegrin Serb politician Puniša Račić. Two died on the spot and two others were wounded but survived. A fifth, the opposition leader Stjepan Radić, died nearly two months later of complications attributed to the shooting. In January 1929, King Alexander instituted a royal dictatorship and renamed the country Yugoslavia. Shortly thereafter, the Croatian politician Ante Pavelić formed the Ustaše, a Croatian nationalist and fascist movement which sought to achieve Croatian independence through violent means. The Ustaše were outlawed in Yugoslavia, but received covert assistance from Benito Mussolini's Italy, which had territorial pretensions in Istria and Dalmatia. The Ustaše carried out a number of actions aimed at undermining Yugoslavia, most notably the Velebit uprising in 1932 and the assassination of King Alexander in Marseille in 1934. Following Alexander's assassination, the Ustaše movement's senior-most leaders, including Pavelić, were tried in absentia in both France and Yugoslavia and sentenced to death, but were granted protection by Mussolini and thus evaded capture.

Following the 1938 Anschluss between Nazi Germany and Austria, Yugoslavia came to share its northwestern border with Germany and fell under increasing pressure as its neighbours aligned themselves with the Axis powers. In April 1939, Italy opened a second frontier with Yugoslavia when it invaded and occupied neighbouring Albania. At the outbreak of World War II, the Royal Yugoslav Government declared its neutrality. Between September and November 1940, Hungary and Romania joined the Tripartite Pact, aligning themselves with the Axis, and Italy invaded Greece. Yugoslavia was by then almost completely surrounded by the Axis powers and their satellites, and its neutral stance toward the war became strained. In late February 1941, Bulgaria joined the Pact. The following day, German troops entered Bulgaria from Romania, closing the ring around Yugoslavia. Intending to secure his southern flank for the impending attack on the Soviet Union, German dictator Adolf Hitler began placing heavy pressure on Yugoslavia to join the Axis. On 25 March 1941, after some delay, the Royal Yugoslav Government conditionally signed the Pact. Two days later, a group of pro-Western, Serbian nationalist Royal Yugoslav Air Force officers deposed the country's regent, Prince Paul, in a bloodless coup d'état. They placed his teenage nephew Peter on the throne and brought to power a "government of national unity" led by the head of the Royal Yugoslav Air Force, General Dušan Simović. The coup enraged Hitler, who immediately ordered Yugoslavia's invasion, which commenced on 6 April 1941.

=== Creation of the NDH ===
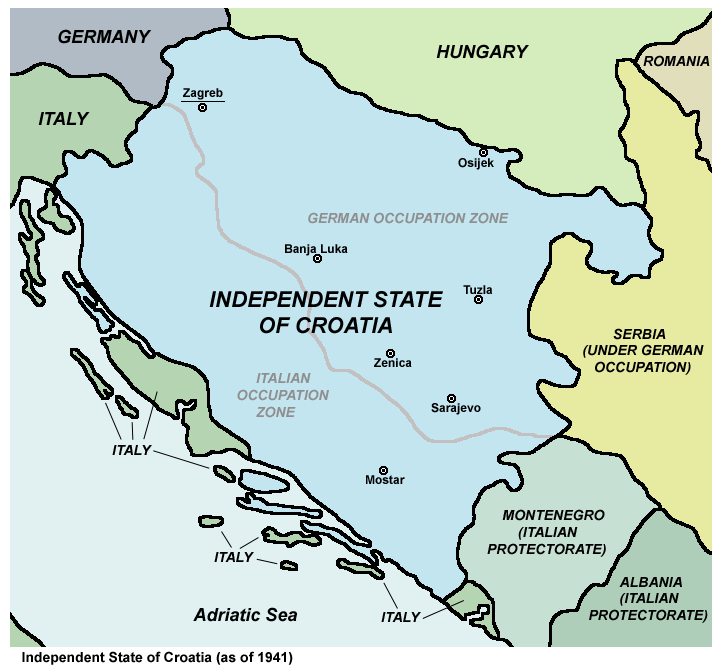
A map depicting the occupation and partition of Yugoslavia, 1941–1943

Yugoslavia was quickly overwhelmed by the combined strength of the Axis powers and surrendered in less than two weeks. The government and royal family went into exile, and the country was occupied and dismembered by its neighbours. Hitler wished to irrevocably dismantle Yugoslavia, which he dubbed a "Versailles construct". Hitler was known to be a virulent Serbophobe. He and other senior German leaders considered the Serbs to be subhuman (German: Untermenschen). Thus, in Hitler's conception of the New Order of Europe, they were to be collectively punished. Serbia was reduced to its pre-Balkan War borders, becoming the only country in the Western Balkans to be directly occupied by the Germans. Serb-inhabited territories west of the Drina River were incorporated into the Axis puppet state known as the Independent State of Croatia (Croatian: Nezavisna država Hrvatska; NDH), which included most of modern-day Croatia, all of modern-day Bosnia and Herzegovina, and parts of modern-day Serbia. The establishment of the NDH had been announced over the radio by Slavko Kvaternik, a former Austro-Hungarian Army officer who had been in contact with Croatian nationalists abroad, on 10 April.

Pavelić entered the NDH on 13 April and reached Zagreb two days later. The same day, Germany and Italy extended diplomatic recognition to the NDH. Pavelić assumed control and bestowed himself the title Poglavnik ("leader"). At the time of its establishment, the NDH had a population of 6.5 million inhabitants, about half of whom were Croats. It was also inhabited by nearly two million Serbs, who constituted about one-third of its total population. Lands inhabited by Serbs accounted for 60–70 percent of the NDH's total landmass. Nevertheless, Serbs – along with others whom the Ustaše deemed "undesirable", such as Jews and Roma – were denied citizenship on the basis that they were not Aryans. Within hours of the NDH's creation, businesses brandished signs reading: "No Serbs, Gypsies, Jews and dogs". Additionally, immediate measures were taken to expunge the presence of the Cyrillic alphabet from the public sphere. On 17 April, the Ustaše instituted the Legal Provision for the Defence of the People and State, a law legitimizing the establishment of concentration camps and the mass shooting of hostages in the NDH. Thirty concentration camps in total were established across the puppet state.

== Operation ==
=== Establishment and first arrivals ===
Đakovo, located about 197 kilometres (122 mi) southeast of Zagreb, is notable as the seat of the Roman Catholic Archdiocese of Đakovo-Osijek, and prior to and during World War II, was the home to one of Croatia's largest concentrations of ethnic Germans. In November 1941, two senior local Jewish community leaders, Dragutin Rosenberg and Aleksandar Klein, persuaded the head of the Jewish Bureau of the Ustaše Surveillance Service (Croatian: Ustaška nadzorna služba; UNS), Vilko Kühnel, to authorize the establishment of a refugee camp in Đakovo. In late November, the Osijek police ordered the town's Jewish community to make room within five days for 2,000 Jewish women and children. Whereas women and children would be deported to Đakovo, Jewish males were to be deported to the largest of the NDH's concentration camps, Jasenovac. Local Jewish youths quickly converted a 40-metre (130 ft)-long, three-storey abandoned flour mill that had once been used by the archdiocese into a refugee camp to house the women and children. Several surrounding buildings were subsequently added to the camp.

On 2 December, 1,800 Jewish women and children and fifty Bosnian Serb women arrived at the camp. Most were from Sarajevo, but also from Zagreb, Požega, Pakrac, Slavonski and Bosanski Brod, Nova Gradiška, Zenica and Travnik. On 8 December, the Jewish community in Sarajevo requested that the Jewish communities in Sarajevo, Zagreb and Osijek be permitted to provide donations to support the civilian populations of the Jasenovac, Loborgrad and Đakovo camps. Ten days later, the UNS's Jewish Bureau permitted the funds that had been raised by the Jewish communities to be allocated to the detainees at these camps. During their confinement, the detainees were made to do manual labour. Ceramics and leather workshops were established within the camp, where most of the adult female detainees worked. As many as 400 women were made to do agricultural work on farms and in fields near the camp. A kindergarten was organized for the children.

The campgrounds provided inadequate shelter from the elements. The detainees were subjected to appalling sanitary conditions. During the first several months of its existence, the camp was guarded by two or three police officers under the command of Dragutin Mayer. The policemen allowed detainees to leave the camp to purchase necessary goods in the town, to visit the hospital in Osijek and to call relatives and friends. Although the detainees were permitted to purchase medicine and the pesticide Zyklon B for disinfection, they were price gouged by the Ustaše.

=== Typhoid epidemic ===
In early 1942, the camp experienced a typhoid outbreak. Prominent locals, most notably the Archbishop of Đakovo, Anton Akšamović, feared that the outbreak could spread outside the camp. On 30 January 1942, the authorities dispatched a medical commission to Đakovo, which took note of the inhumane living conditions to which the detainees were subjected, and recommended an increase in the amount and quality of medical supplies allocated to the camp. No action was taken to remedy the situation. A small number of prisoners were consequently taken to hospitals. Around the same time, local officials demanded that the camp be relocated further from the town to stem the epidemic, but because the arrest and deportation of Slovenian Jews had recently commenced, the UNS sought to enlarge the camp. These deportations led to an increase in the number and size of transports to the camp by February. A transport of 1,161 women, originating from Stara Gradiška, arrived at Đakovo on 24 February 1942. By this time, the camp housed about 3,000 deportees, around one-quarter of them children under the age of 14. Of the 1,073 women and children who arrived at Đakovo between 26 February and 6 March 1942, 274 – or just over one-quarter – were from Zagreb.

The large increase in the number of detainees swiftly worsened the typhoid epidemic. According to several authors, the transfer of women and children from Stara Gradiška to Đakovo was made intentionally to further the spread of typhoid fever among the Đakovo detainees. By March 1942, 631 detainees were hospitalized, an additional 219 were infected, and 131 had died. In response to the epidemic, the authorities and the local Jewish community agreed to place some of the Jewish children from the camp in the care of local Jewish foster families. All Jewish children under the age of ten were to be removed from the camp as part of this arrangement. Jewish community officials administered the camp until 29 March 1942. In mid-April 1942, the Ustaše assumed direct control of the camp with a detachment from Jasenovac led by Jozo Matijević. Some of these new guards set up living quarters in adjacent villages and others lived on the camp premises. The new camp guards ensured that none of the detainees could leave the campgrounds, as had previously been the case, and the detainees were thus no longer able to make contact with the outside world. All subsequent aid deliveries were seized by the Ustaše and detainees were often robbed. Hunger became rampant; daily rations were reduced to two or three potatoes per person. Many detainees were subjected to rape and torture. Although no systematic killings took place, detainees were routinely abused and humiliated, and multiple individual killings occurred as well. On one occasion, the Ustaše amused themselves by tossing loaves of bread to the starving children. When the children set upon the bread, the Ustaše released their hungry dogs upon them. According to one eyewitness, after a dog tore a piece of flesh from one of the children, one of the Ustaše dragged both the child and the dog into a storehouse and locked the door. As the child screamed, the Ustaše danced to the accordion.

=== Closure ===
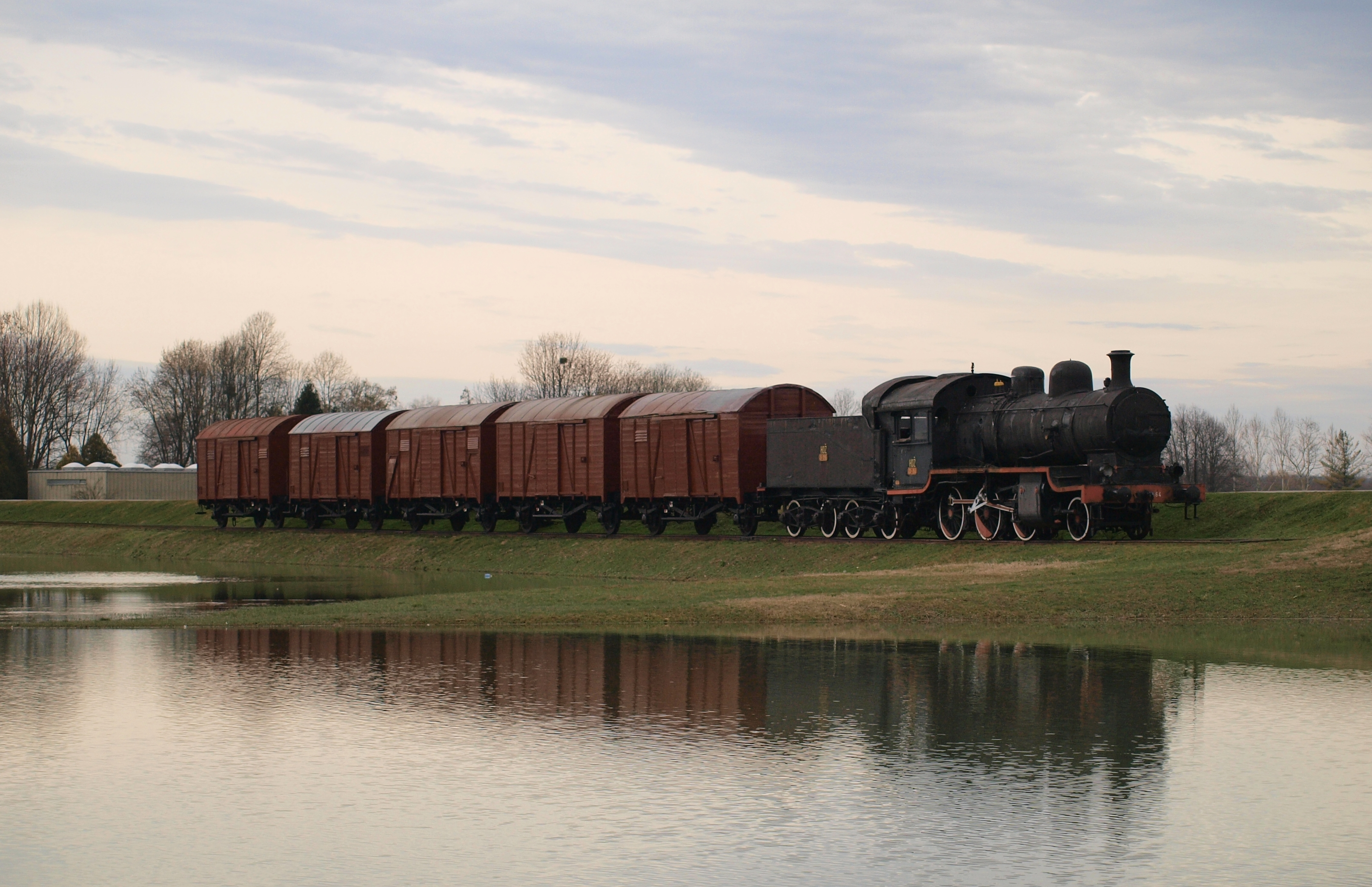
One of the trains that transported prisoners to Jasenovac on display in 2010

By May, as many as 800 detainees had succumbed to typhoid fever, which killed between five and six detainees daily. An additional 700 detainees contracted other diseases. By this point, the camp had become a burden to the Ustaše. On 18 May 1942, the Ministry of Health asked the Directorate for Public Order and Security (Croatian: Ravnateljstvo za javni red i sigurnost; RAVSIGUR) to dissolve the camp within one month. This message was personally relayed to RAVSIGUR by the Minister of Health, Ivo Petrić, who proposed the "relocation" or "closing down" of the camp together with the provision of "improved and increased food for the prisoners". Despite Petrić's suggestions, RAVSIGUR decided it would be most expedient to kill all the detainees. Zagreb's Jewish community subsequently offered to help restock the camp, but the authorities declined their offer because they had already decided to liquidate it.

Between 15 June and 7 July, 2,400–3,200 detainees were transported from Đakovo to Jasenovac. The operation was overseen by Lieutenant (Croatian: Poručnik) Joso Matković. For days, they were left in locked railway carriages on the train tracks outside the camp, and many consequently died of heat, thirst and hunger. Those that survived this ordeal were taken off the railway carriages, ferried across the Sava River and killed. Their bodies were then pushed into the Sava by Romani slave labourers, who were later killed themselves. Unaware of their fate, between 7 July and 14 July, the Jewish community in Zagreb sent about 120 food parcels to Jasenovac for the former Đakovo detainees. By September 1942, members of Zagreb's Jewish community began to suspect that the detainees had been killed, although when asked, Ustaše officials would only reply that the detainees had been transported to Jasenovac.

== Legacy ==
During the course of its existence, the Đakovo camp housed as many as 3,800 civilians. In August 1942, around 1,200 Jews were deported from Osijek, leaving all but 40 to 50 of the Jewish foster children that had been taken from the Đakovo camp left in the town. Many of these children subsequently escaped to Split, in the Italian occupation zone. Around 25,000 Jews were killed in the NDH during the Holocaust, according to Yad Vashem. In 1945, the Yugoslav authorities undertook exhumations on the Đakovo camp's former grounds. The following year, former Jasenovac concentration camp administrator Miroslav Filipović testified about the killing of the Đakovo detainees at Jasenovac in July 1942.

In September 1952, the Union of Jewish Communities of Yugoslavia unveiled five monuments to the victims of the Holocaust in Belgrade, Zagreb, Sarajevo, Novi Sad and Đakovo. Following Croatia's independence from Yugoslavia, the site of the former camp was turned into a gas station. A commemorative ceremony is held at the site every year on the first Sunday in June. The commemoration also encompasses the nearby cemetery in which the camp detainees who died were buried. The cemetery is unique in that it is the only burial site in Europe where victims of the Holocaust were interred under their first and last names and not merely their inmate number. There are 569 camp victims buried in the cemetery. On this basis, the historians Jens Hoppe and Alexander Korb have concluded that the camp's mortality rate amounted to nearly 19 percent. In June 2013, a sculpture titled Peace in Heaven, by Croatian-born Israeli sculptor Dina Merhav, was unveiled in Đakovo to commemorate those who were interned at the camp.
