= Nikola Tusun =

Croatian collaborationist official

Nikola Tusun (7 April 1899 – 1945) was a Croatian lawyer and Ustaše official in the Axis puppet state known as the Independent State of Croatia (Croatian: Nezavisna država Hrvatska; NDH) during World War II.

He was born in the village of Jankovići, near the town of Travnik in central Bosnia whilst the region was under Austro-Hungarian rule. After completing his secondary education in Travnik and receiving his juris doctor from the University of Zagreb, he worked as a civil servant until 1929, then opened a law practice in the town of Pregrada, north of Zagreb. Between 1934 and 1940, he worked as a lawyer in Petrinja. Having previously been a member of the Croatian Peasant Party, he relocated to Travnik in 1940 and joined the fascist, Croatian nationalist Ustaše movement, which sought Croatia's secession from the Kingdom of Yugoslavia. In June 1941, several months after the NDH's establishment following the Axis invasion of Yugoslavia, Tusun was appointed Grand Prefect (Croatian: veliki župan) of Lašva–Glaž, whose administrative centre was in Travnik.

On 19 September 1941, Tusun wrote to the Directorate for Security and Public Order (Croatian: Ravnateljstvo za javni red i sigurnost; RAVSIGUR) that "a certain territory must be found where Jews from the entire country could be deported to and where they would be isolated from our people. On this territory, Jews should be guarded and supervised. In this way, we would cleanse our cities from the Jewish element." He estimated that, by mid-September, the Kruščica concentration camp in nearby Vitez held 1,539 inmates. The historian Jens Hoppe believes this figure is "most likely too low", and suggests the camp held at least 3,000 prisoners at this time, mostly Jewish women, but also around 300 Serb women from Herzegovina.

From September 1942 to late December 1943, Tusun served as the Grand Prefect of Pokuplje, whose administrative centre was in Karlovac. In the town's local paper, Tusun mocked the official name of the Yugoslav Partisans (the National Liberation Army) by suggesting that it was an apt description: "if allowed, the Communists would gladly "liberate" people of their freedom, their Catholic religion, their property, and, ultimately, their lives." In his speeches, he heavily referenced NDH minister Mladen Lorković's Siva knjiga ("Grey Book"), which documented alleged rebel crimes against the NDH and its civilian population. Tusun accused "Serb renegades" of "decapitating people, gouging out their eyes and ears, cutting off the breasts of women, stabbing pregnant women, and even placing people on spears and roasting them like animals on a spit." According to the scholar Filip Erdeljac, "Such a description of the rebels' alleged crimes corresponded neatly to the overall propaganda campaign depicting the savagery of Eastern peoples, to whom the rebels belonged, and to the degenerate ideology of Communism that they represented."

Subsequently, Tusun was once again appointed as the Grand Prefect in Travnik, this time of the renamed Grand Prefecture of Lašva–Rama. He was killed by the Yugoslav Partisans in Travnik as the NDH disintegrated in 1945, alongside his wife and eldest son.
