= Occupied Bosnia and Herzegovina =

Occupied Bosnia and Herzegovina may refer to:

- Ottoman Bosnia and Herzegovina#Ottoman Rule, (1463-1878)
- Austro-Hungarian rule in Bosnia and Herzegovina, following the Congress of Berlin of 1878
- Bosnia and Herzegovina#World War II (1941–45), occupation by Independent State of Croatia, a Nazi puppet state

== See also ==
- Ottoman Bosnia and Herzegovina
- Counties of the Independent State of Croatia
