= D25 road (Croatia) =

Road in Croatia

D25 state road

Route information
- Length: 83.6 km (51.9 mi)

Major junctions
- From: D1 in Korenica
- D50 in Lički Osik and Gospić; D534 in Budak
- To: D8 in Karlobag

Location
- Country: Croatia
- Counties: Lika-Senj
- Major cities: Korenica, Gospić, Karlobag

Highway system
- Highways in Croatia

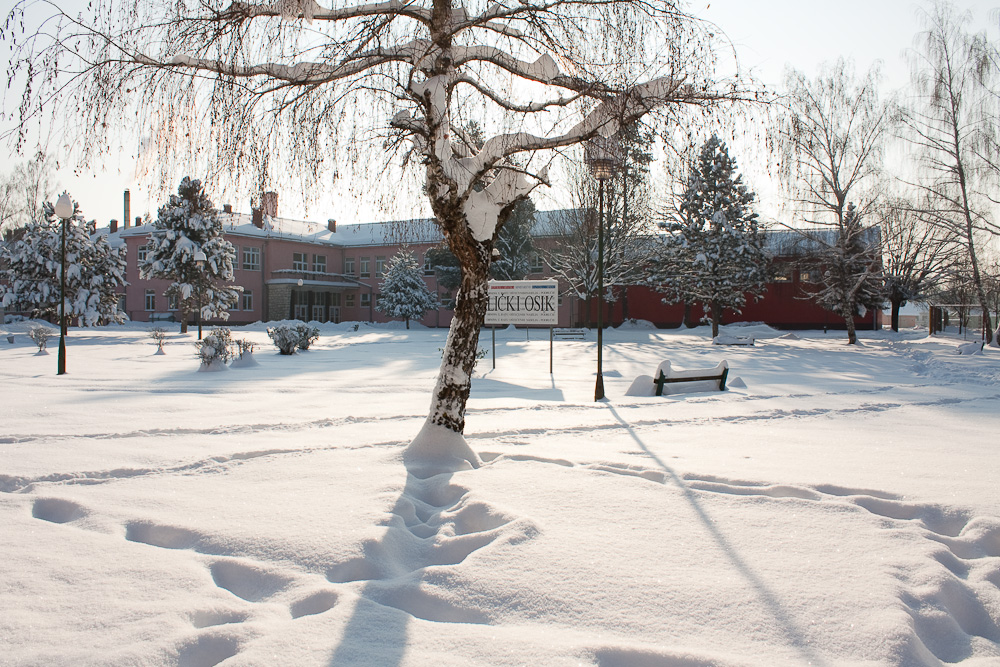
Lički Osik, on the D25 route

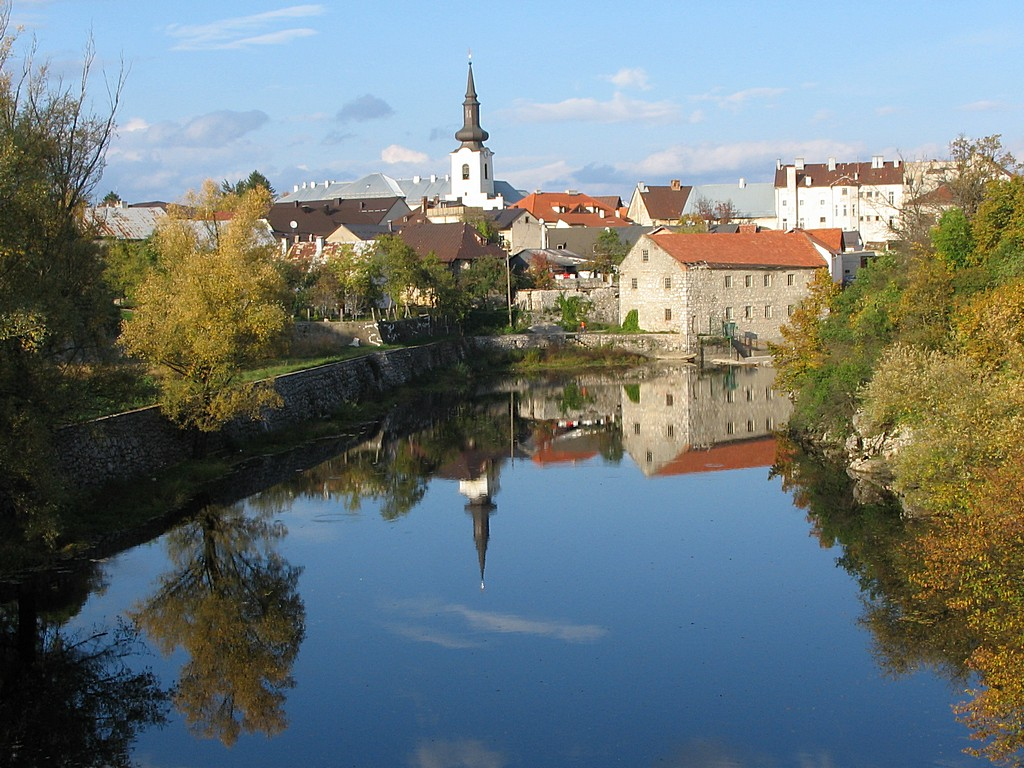
Gospić, on the D25 route

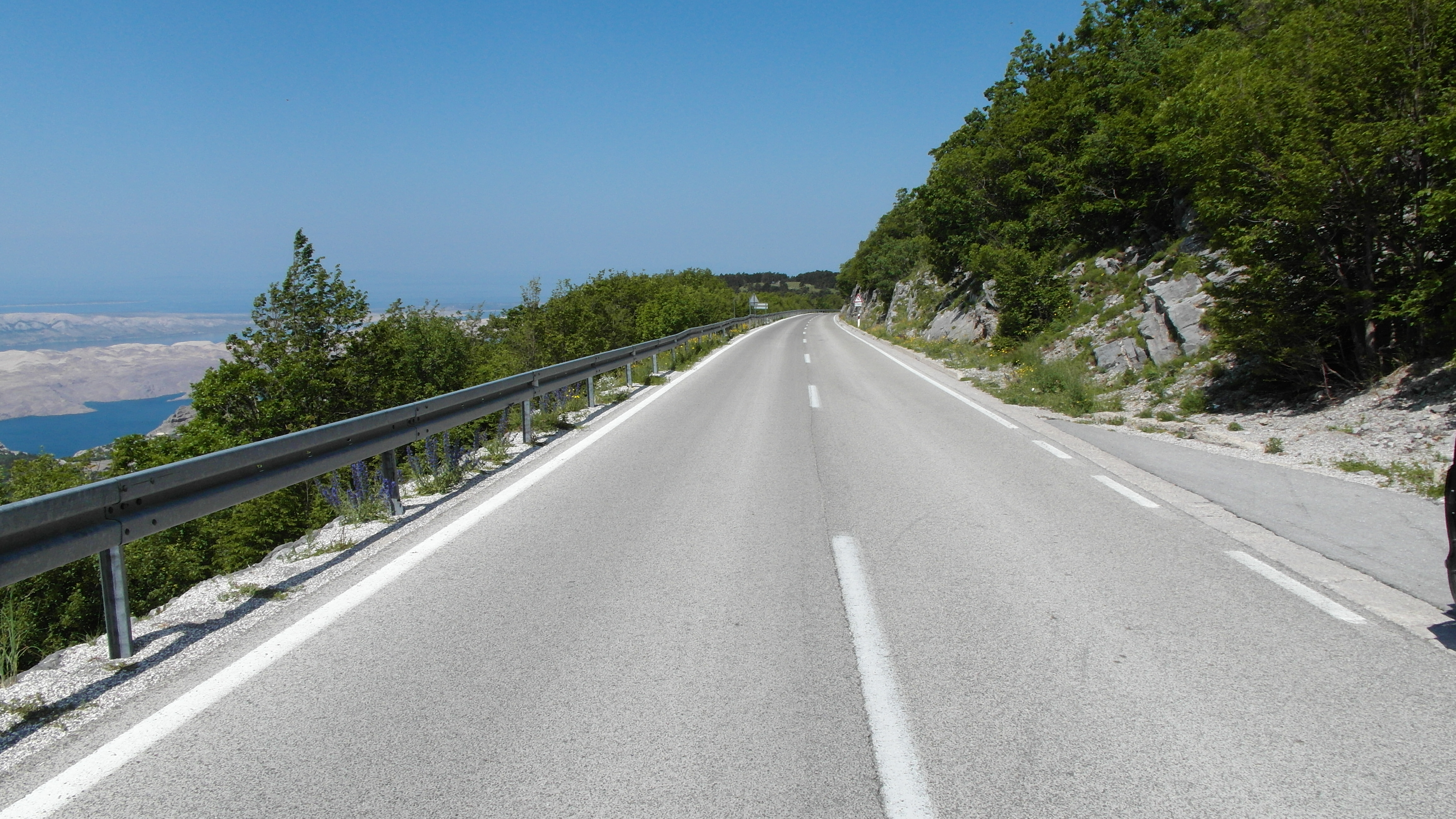
D25 route after the Oštarijska vrata to the sea

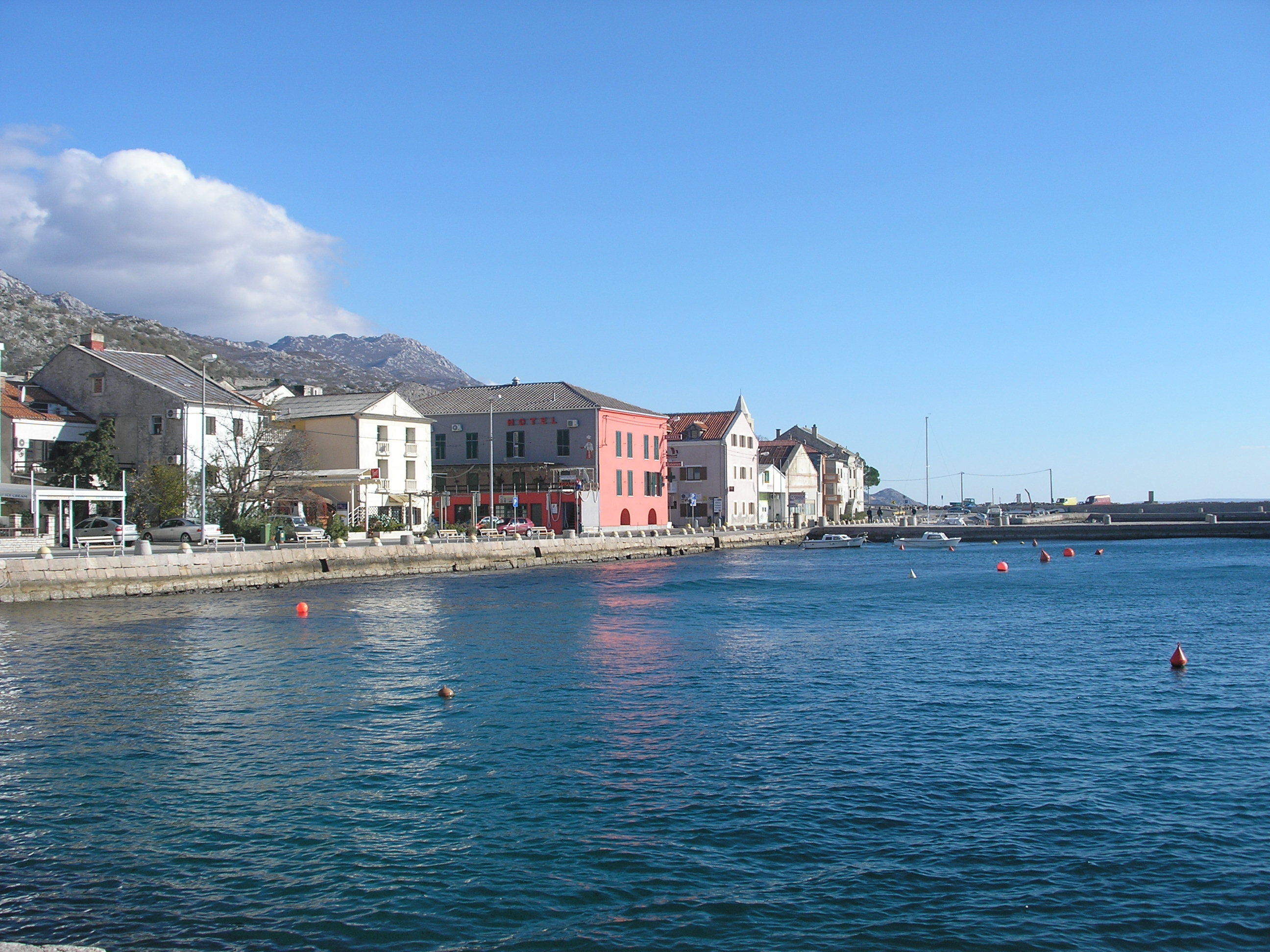
Karlobag, at the western terminus of the D25 route

D50 state road, located mainly in Lika region of Croatia connecting cities and towns of Korenica, Gospić and Karlobag, to the state road network of Croatia, and most notably to D1 and D8 state roads and the A1 motorway Gospić interchange (via D534 state road). The road is 83.6 km (51.9 mi) long. The route comprises a significant number of urban intersections, in segment of the road running through Gospić.

The D25 and D50 state roads are concurrent in a segment between Lički Osik and Gospić.

The road, as well as all other state roads in Croatia, is managed and maintained by Hrvatske ceste, a state-owned company.

== Traffic volume ==
Traffic is regularly counted and reported by Hrvatske ceste, operator of the road. Substantial variations between annual (AADT) and summer (ASDT) traffic volumes at some counting sites, especially those between Karlobag and Gospić, are attributed to the fact that the road connects to D8 state road which in turn provides connections to the Adriatic coast resorts.

D25 traffic volume
Road	Counting site	AADT	ASDT	Notes
D25	4303 Bunić	496	835	Adjacent to Ž5156 junction.
D25	4206 Budak	4,473	4,625	Adjacent to Ž5171 junction.
D25	4209 Novoselo Trnovačko	1,118	1,910	Between the Ž5162 and Ž5163 junctions.

== Road junctions and populated areas ==
D25 major junctions/populated areas
Type	Slip roads/Notes
	Korenica; D1 to Slunj and Karlovac (to the north) and Knin and Split (to the south). The eastern terminus of the road.
	Kalebovac
	Vrpile
	Bunić; Ž5156 to Kozjan.
	Široka Kula
	Lički Osik; D50 to Perušić (to the north). The westbound D25 and the southbound D50 are concurrent between Lički Osik and Gospić.
	Budak; D534 to A1 motorway in Gospić interchange.
	Gospić; D50 to Medak (to the south). The eastbound D25 and the northbound D50 are concurrent between Lički Osik and Gospić.
	Kaniža Gospićka
	Podoštra
	Novoselo Trnovačko
	Brušane
	Baške Oštarije
	Sušanj Cesarički
	Vidovac Cesarički
	Karlobag; D8 to Maslenica, Obrovac and A1 motorway Maslenica interchange (to the south), and to Senj (to the north). The western terminus of the road.

== See also ==
- Highways in Croatia
