= Došen Dabar =

- Village
- Location within Croatia
- Coordinates: 44°34′N 15°07′E
- Country: Croatia
- County: Lika-Senj
- Municipality: Karlobag

Area
  - Total: 17.4 km^{2} (6.7 sq mi)

Population (2021)
  - Total: 0
  - Density: 0.0/km^{2} (0.0/sq mi)
- Time zone: UTC+1 (CET)
  - Summer (DST): UTC+2 (CEST)

Došen Dabar is an uninhabited settlement in Croatia.
