= Lički Osik =

- Village
- Location of Lički Osik in Croatia
- Coordinates: 44°36′13″N 15°25′27″E
- Country: Croatia
- County: Lika-Senj
- Municipality: Gospić

Area
  - Total: 15.1 km^{2} (5.8 sq mi)
- Elevation: 575 m (1,886 ft)

Population (2021)
  - Total: 1,438
  - Density: 95.2/km^{2} (247/sq mi)
- Time zone: UTC+1 (CET)
  - Summer (DST): UTC+2 (CEST)
- Postal code: 53201
- Area code: (+385) 053

Lički Osik is a village in Croatia situated 8 km north-east from Gospić. It is connected by the D25 highway.

== Demographics ==
According to the 2011 census, the village of Lički Osik has 1914 inhabitants. This represents 66.34% of its pre-war population according to the 1991 census.

The 1991 census recorded that 54.42% of the village population were ethnic Serbs (1570/2885), 40.07% were Croats (1156/2885), 3.09% were Yugoslavs (89/2885) while 2.42% were of other ethnic origin (70/2885).

Historical population 1857-2011
v

population	429	490	428	732	674	674	652	689	532	726	2298	3035	3045	2885	1772	1914
	1857	1869	1880	1890	1900	1910	1921	1931	1948	1953	1961	1971	1981	1991	2001	2011

Sources: Croatian Bureau of Statistics publications

NOTE: The 1981 and 1991 figures include Budak population.

== Gallery ==
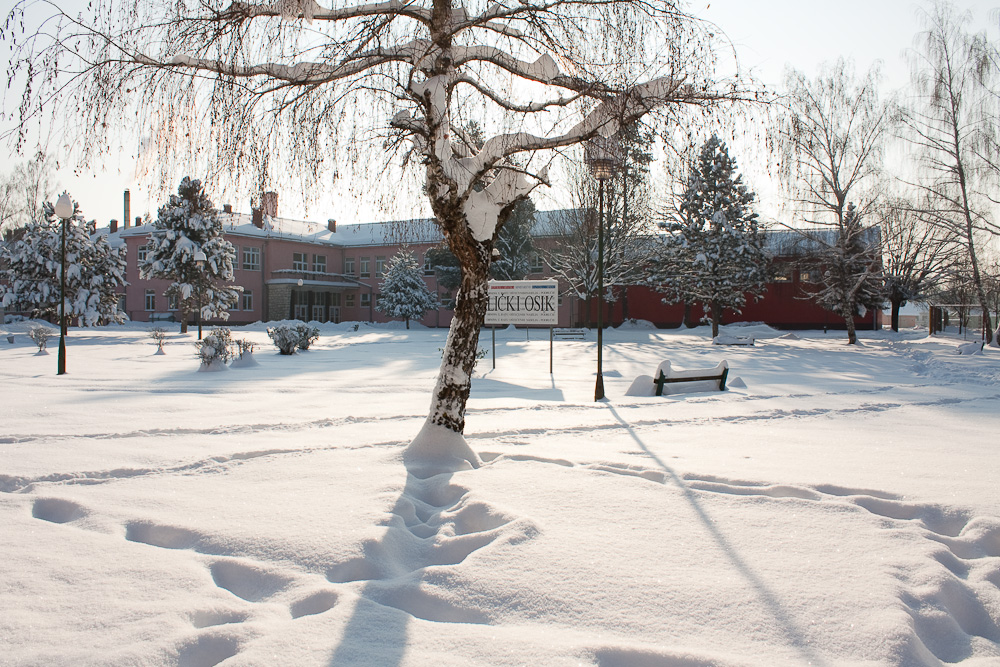
Park and primary school in Lički Osik

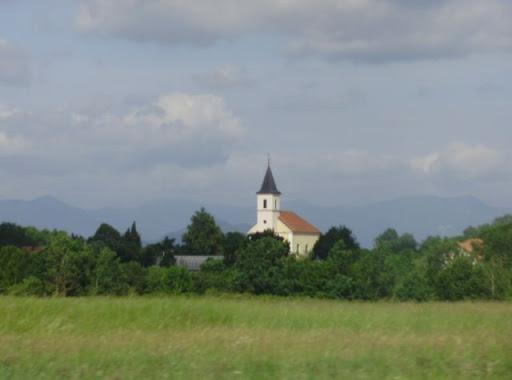
Roman Catholic church in Lički Osik
