= Novoselo Trnovačko =

- Village
- Interactive map of Novoselo Trnovačko
- Location within Croatia
- Coordinates: 44.51772°N 15.30797°E
- Country: Croatia
- County: Lika-Senj
- Municipality: Gospić

Area
  - Total: 0.82 sq mi (2.13 km^{2})

Population (2021)
  - Total: 93
  - Density: 110/sq mi (44/km^{2})
- Time zone: UTC+1 (CET)
  - Summer (DST): UTC+2 (CEST)

Novoselo Trnovačko is a village in the City of Gospić, Croatia. It is connected by the D25 road.
