= Lobor concentration camp =

WWII children's camp in modern-day Croatia

- Concentration camp
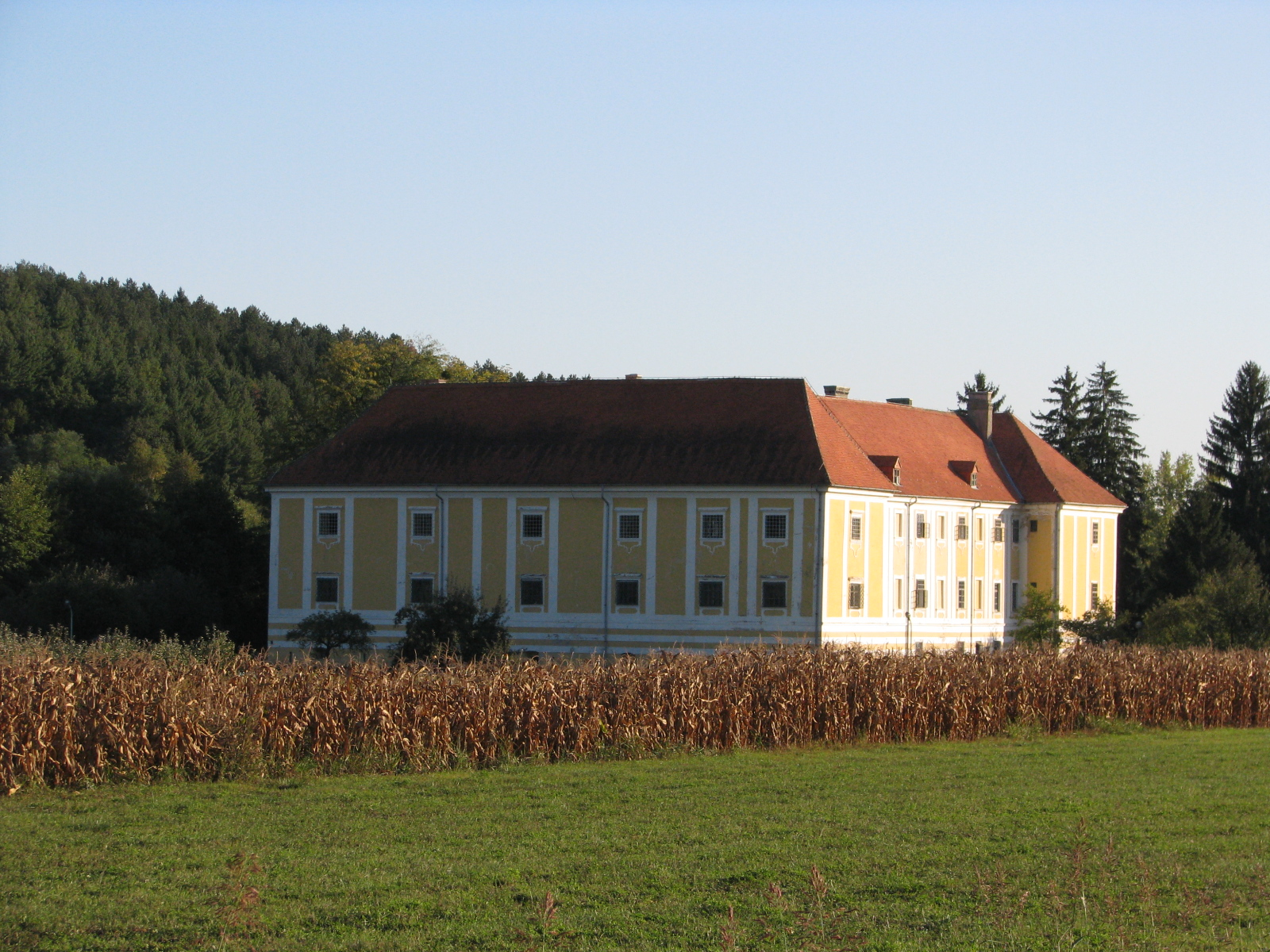
- The palace of Keglevich in 2011, the former place of Lobor concentration camp
- Coordinates: 46°7′16″N 16°4′3″E
- Other names: Loborgrad
- Location: Lobor, Zlatar Bistrica, Independent State of Croatia (modern-day Croatia)
- Operated by: Independent State of Croatia
- Original use: The palace of Keglevich family
- Operational: 9 August 1941 - November 1942
- Inmates: Jewish and Serb women and children
- Killed: at least 200

The Lobor concentration camp or Loborgrad camp (Croatian: Koncentracijski logor Lobor) was a concentration camp established in Lobor, Independent State of Croatia (modern-day Croatia) in the deserted palace of Keglevich family. It was established on 9 August 1941, mostly for Serb and Jewish women and children. The camp was established and operated by Ustaše, with 16 of its guards being members of the local Volksdeutsche community. Its inmates were subjected to systematic torture, robbery and murder of "undisciplined" individuals. All younger female inmates of the Lobor camp were subjected to rapes. More than 2,000 people were inmates of this camp and at least 200 died in it. All surviving children and women were transported to Auschwitz concentration camp in August 1942 where they all were killed.

== Establishment ==
The Lobor concentration camp was established on 9 August 1941, mostly for Serb and Jewish children and women. The camp was established in the deserted palace of the Keglevich family. It was established, operated, and controlled by the Ustasha Surveillance Service subordinated to the Main Ustaša Headquarters and the guards were members of the German ethnic community (Volksdeutsche), 16 in total. The maximum capacity of this camp was 800 prisoners.

== Inmates ==
Because of the significant proportion of children among its prisoners, this camp was categorized as a children's concentration camp, along with Jablanac, Mlaka, Bročica brickyard, Uštica, Sisak, Jastrebarsko and Gornja Rijeka. According to some sources, the total number of children held in concentration camps in Croatia in 1942 was at least 24,000. The first contingent of inmates numbering 1,300 people was transported to Lobor camp from Kruščica concentration camp. The number of women and children inmates in Lobor camp reached 1,500. All younger female inmates of the Lobor camp were subjected to rapes by the commanding officers and guards, which resulted in pregnancies in girls as young as 14 years old. Besides systematic rapes, the inmates were subjected to torture, robbery and murder of "undisciplined" individuals. At least 200 women and children died in Lobor camp. There was no mass killing of inmates in Lobor, but 150 inmates died because of a typhoid epidemic.

Around 2,000 Jewish women and children were inmates of this concentration camp during its existence. In the period between 13 and 28 August 1942 all children and women that survived were transported to Auschwitz concentration camp where they all were killed.

== Aftermath ==
In 2002 the Home for Mentally ill Adults Lobor-Grad was established at the location which housed the camp. According to its website, during the World War II its building was the almshouse of The Society for the Suppression of begging and supporting sick.

== Sources ==
- Premerl, Nada (1988). Židovi na tlu Jugoslavije: Muzejski prostor Zagreb, 14.IV.-12.VI.1988. MTM.
- Boban, Ljubo (1976). Sjeverozapadna Hrvatska u NOB-u i socijalističkoj revoluciji: zbornik. Zajednica općina memorijalnog područja Kalnik.
- Bulajić, Milan (1988). Ustaški zločini genocida i suđenje Andriji Artukoviću 1986. godine. Rad. ISBN 9788609001475.
- Bulajić, Milan (1994). The Role of the Vatican in the break-up of the Yugoslav State: The Mission of the Vatican in the Independent State of Croatia. Ustashi Crimes of Genocide. Belgrade: Stručna knjiga.
- Bulajić, Milan (2002). Jasenovac: The Jewish-Serbian Holocaust (the role of the Vatican) in Nazi-Ustasha Croatia (1941-1945). Belgrade: Fund for Genocide Research, Stručna knjiga. ISBN 9788641902211.
- Čulinović, Ferdo (1970). Okupatorska podjela Jugoslavije. Vojnoizdavački.
- Miletić, Antun (1986). Koncentracioni logor Jasenovac 1941-1945: dokumenta. Narodna knjiga. ISBN 9788633100250.
- Institut (1988). Historical contributions. Institut.
- Jelić-Butić, Fikreta (1977). Ustaše i Nezavisna Država Hrvatska: 1941-1945. Sveučiliǎna naklada Liber; Školska knjiga.
- Croatia (1990). Časopis za suvremenu povijest.
- Antonić, Zdravko (2001). Dokumenta o genocidu nad Srbima u Bosni i Herzegovini od aprila do avgusta 1941. Akademija nauka i umjetnosti Republike Srpske.
- Gerolymatos, Andre (20 March 2003). The Balkan Wars: Conquest, Revolution, and Retribution from the Ottoman Era to the Twentieth Century and Beyond. Basic Books. p. 242. ISBN 978-0-465-02732-3.
- Skolnik, Fred; Berenbaum, Michael (2007). Encyclopaedia Judaica. Macmillan Reference USA. ISBN 978-0-02-865949-7.
- Centre (1998). Jews in Eastern Europe. The Centre.
- Goldstein, Ivo; Lengel-Krizman, Narcisa (1997). Anti-semitism, Holocaust, anti-Fascism. Jewish Community. ISBN 978-953-96836-1-8.
- Bauer, Yehuda (1981). American Jewry and the Holocaust: The American Jewish Joint Distribution Committee, 1939-1945. Wayne State University Press. ISBN 0-8143-1672-7.
