= Podoštra =

- Village
- Image of Podoštra with Gospić in the background
- Interactive map of Podoštra
- Location within Croatia
- Coordinates: 44.52743°N 15.33446°E
- Country: Croatia
- Region: Lika
- County: Lika-Senj
- Municipality: Gospić

Area
  - Total: 1.44 sq mi (3.74 km^{2})

Population (2021)
  - Total: 160
  - Density: 110/sq mi (43/km^{2})
- Time zone: UTC+1 (CET)
  - Summer (DST): UTC+2 (CEST)

Podoštra is a village in the City of Gospić, Croatia. It is connected by the D25 road.
