= Velebit uprising =

1932 terrorist attack in Yugoslavia

Velebit Uprising
- Part of Interwar period
Date	6 to 7 September 1932
Location	Brušane, Lika region of Croatia
Result	Yugoslav Gendarmerie victory

Belligerents
Croatian Nationalists: UHRO; Croatian Monarchist Émigré; Supported by: (Fascist Italy) Kingdom of Italy; Hungary	Kingdom of Yugoslavia: Royal Yugoslav Gendarmerie

Commanders and leaders
Ante Pavelić; Andrija Artuković; Marko Došen; Stephan Duić	Alexander I of Yugoslavia

Casualties and losses
1 Ustaša millitant killed	Several gendarmes wounded

The Velebit uprising or Lika uprising (Croatian: Velebitski ustanak; Lički ustanak) was a minor action carried out by Ustaša militias against a Yugoslav gendarmerie station on 6 and 7 September 1932.

== Preparation ==
In the area near Gospić, the Ustaša militia was well-organized and led by lawyer Andrija Artuković. Some other notable members of Gospić's Ustaša branch were landowner Marko Došen, former Austrian-Hungarian officer Juraj Juco Rukavina, traders Josip Tomljenović and Nikola Orešković, and tax clerk Josip Japunčić.

Rukavina had one of the more important roles in the uprising. He visited a number of villages to gain support from local inhabitants for the uprising. The Ustaše spread propaganda stating that Fascist Italy supported Croatian independence, and that the Ustaše would help them to gain the area near the Triglav and Ljubljana mountains, while the Italians would give Rijeka and Trieste to Croatia.

Since the main goal was sabotage of the military depot and garrison in Gospić, the Ustaše tried to establish contact with some military personnel, but without major success. The Ustaše from Gospić were in contact with the Ustaše in emigration, constantly exchanging information and advice. Before the beginning of the action, Italian authorities gave permission to the Ustaše to start the action. Ustaša leader Ante Brkan was responsible for transferring arms from Italy through Zadar, which was then part of the Italian state. In early 1932, the first arms were transferred with a major shipment of arms arriving in August.

At the same time the Ustaše prepared by enlisting men for the action. Two sergeants, Josip Čačić and Ante Malbaša agreed to participate. Five armed and uniformed Ustaše arrived from Italy, among whom was Rafael Boban. They hid in a house of some peasants in Lukovo Šugarje village, and were later followed by another five Ustaše.

At a meeting held in Spittal in Austria held on 28 August 1932, Ante Pavelić, Gustav Perčec, and Vjekoslav Servatzy decided to start a small uprising. Servatzy was chosen to organize the action. Before the action started, Artuković and Došen went to Zadar to avoid arrest by the Yugoslav gendarmerie.

== Attack at Brušane ==
During the night between 6 and 7 September, the Ustaše launched an attack on the gendarmerie station in Brušane village near Gospić. Besides the ten Ustaše that arrived, some Ustaše from Gospić also participated in the assault. Before the attack, the Ustaše cut the phone lines to the gendarmerie station in Gospić, then opened fire on the gendarmerie station in Brušane. The attack lasted for half an hour, after which the Ustaše who lived in Croatia returned to their homes, while those who came from Italy went to Zadar across the Velebit. Though the leader of the action, Artuković, escaped, he was arrested and put on trial in 1936 in Belgrade. He was accused, among other Ustaše, of destruction of the gendarmerie station on the night of the action. One member of the group, Stjepan Devčić, was killed at Jadovno by gendarmerie members during the follow-up operation.

== Aftermath ==
Despite the small scale of the uprising, the Yugoslav authorities were unnerved because the power of the Ustaše was unknown. As a result, major security measures were introduced. This action had an impact in the foreign media, especially among the Italian and Hungarian press. In November 1932 in an article published in the official gazette of the Communist Party of Yugoslavia, party general secretary Milan Gorkić criticised the communist leadership in Dalmatia because they did not join the Ustaše during the Velebit uprising.

Juraj Rukavina was sentenced to death by hanging for his involvement, a sentence which was later commuted to life in prison by King Alexander I. Rukavina was released from prison in 1939, but then interned shortly after. He was freed after the invasion of Yugoslavia, and became the commandant of the Jadovno concentration camp, where tens of thousands of Serbs and Jews were killed. After the war, Rukavina was captured by the British in Bleiburg. He was handed over to Yugoslav authorities during the Bleiburg repatriations, after which he was immediately put on trial. Rukavina was sentenced to death for war crimes, and was executed by firing squad in June 1945.
