= Districts of the Independent State of Croatia =

The districts (Croatian: kotar, pl. kotari, German: Bezirk) were the secondary territorial subdivisions of the Independent State of Croatia. There were 139 of them originally, with that number changing after the capitulation of Italy and the discontinuation of the Treaties of Rome. The districts were each a part of a county, and were themselves further divided into municipalities.

== Districts from 1941–43 ==
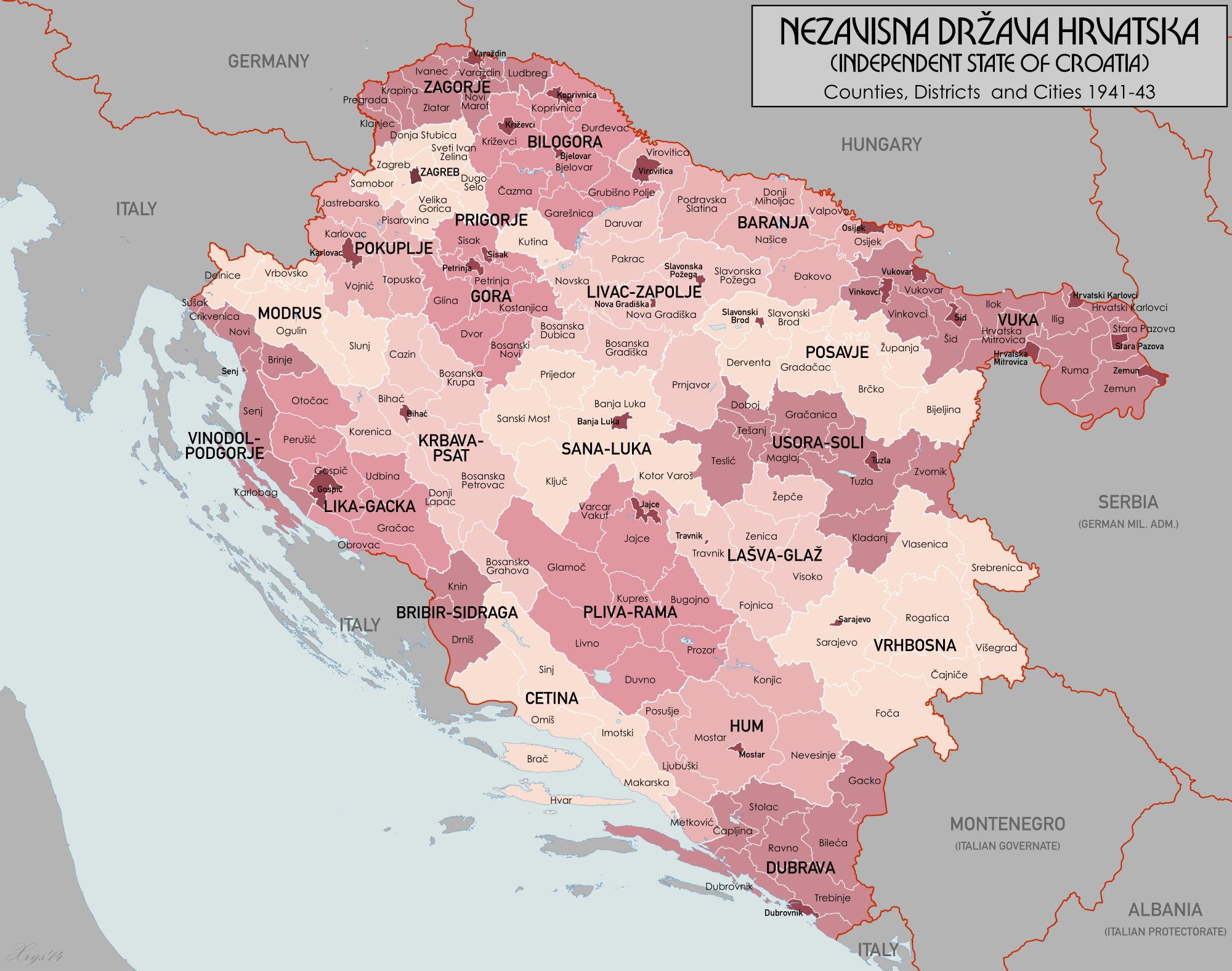
1941–1943

County	Districts	Cities
Baranja	Đakovo, Donji Miholjac, Našice, Osijek, Podravska Slatina, Valpovo, Virovitica	Osijek, Virovitica
Bilogora	Bjelovar, Čazma, Garešnica, Đurđevac, Grubišno Polje, Koprivnica, Križevci	Bjelovar, Koprivnica, Križevci
Bribir-Sidraga	Drniš, Knin	
Cetina	Brač, Hvar, Imotski, Makarska, Omiš, Sinj	
Dubrava	Bileća, Čapljina, Dubrovnik, Gacko, Ravno, Stolac, Trebinje	Dubrovnik
Gora	Bosanski Novi, Dvor, Glina, Kostajnica, Petrinja, Sisak, Topusko	Petrinja, Sisak
Hum	Konjic, Ljubuški, Metković, Mostar, Nevesinje, Posušje	Mostar
Krbava-Psat	Bihać, Bosanska Krupa, Bosansko Grahovo, Bosanski Petrovac, Cazin, Donji Lapac, Korenica	Bihać
Lašva-Glaž	Fojnica, Travnik, Visoko, Zenica, Žepče	Travnik
Lika-Gacka	Gospić, Gračac, Obrovac, Otočac, Perušić, Udbina	Gospić
Livac-Zapolje	Bosanska Dubica, Bosanska Gradiška, Daruvar, Nova Gradiška, Novska, Pakrac, Slavonska Požega, Prnjavor	Nova Gradiška, Slavonska Požega
Modruš	Delnice, Ogulin, Slunj, Vrbovsko	
Pliva-Rama	Bugojno, Duvno, Glamoč, Jajce, Kupres, Livno, Prozor, Varcar Vakuf	Jajce
Pokupje	Jastrebarsko, Karlovac, Pisarovina, Vojnić	
Posavje	Bijeljina, Brčko, Slavonski Brod, Derventa, Gradačac, Županja	Slavonski Brod
Prigorje	Donja Stubica, Dugo Selo, Kutina, Samobor, Sveti Ivan Zelina, Velika Gorica, Zagreb	
Sana-Luka	Banja Luka, Ključ, Kotor Varoš, Prijedor, Sanski Most	Banja Luka
Usora-Soli	Doboj, Gračanica, Kladanj, Maglaj, Teslić, Tešanj, Tuzla, Zvornik	Tuzla
Vinodol-Podgorje	Brinje, Karlobag, Kraljevica, Novi, Senj	Senj
Vrhbosna	Čajniče, Foča, Rogatica, Sarajevo, Srebrenica, Višegrad, Vlasenica	Sarajevo
Vuka	Hrvatska Mitrovica, Hrvatski Karlovci, Ilok, Irig, Ruma, Stara Pazova, Šid, Vinkovci, Vukovar, Zemun	Hrvatska Mitrovica, Hrvatski Karlovci, Stara Pazova, Šid, Vinkovci, Vukovar, Zemun
Zagorje	Ivanec, Klanjec, Krapina, Ludbreg, Novi Marof, Pregrada, Varaždin, Zlatar	Varaždin

== Districts from 1943–45 ==
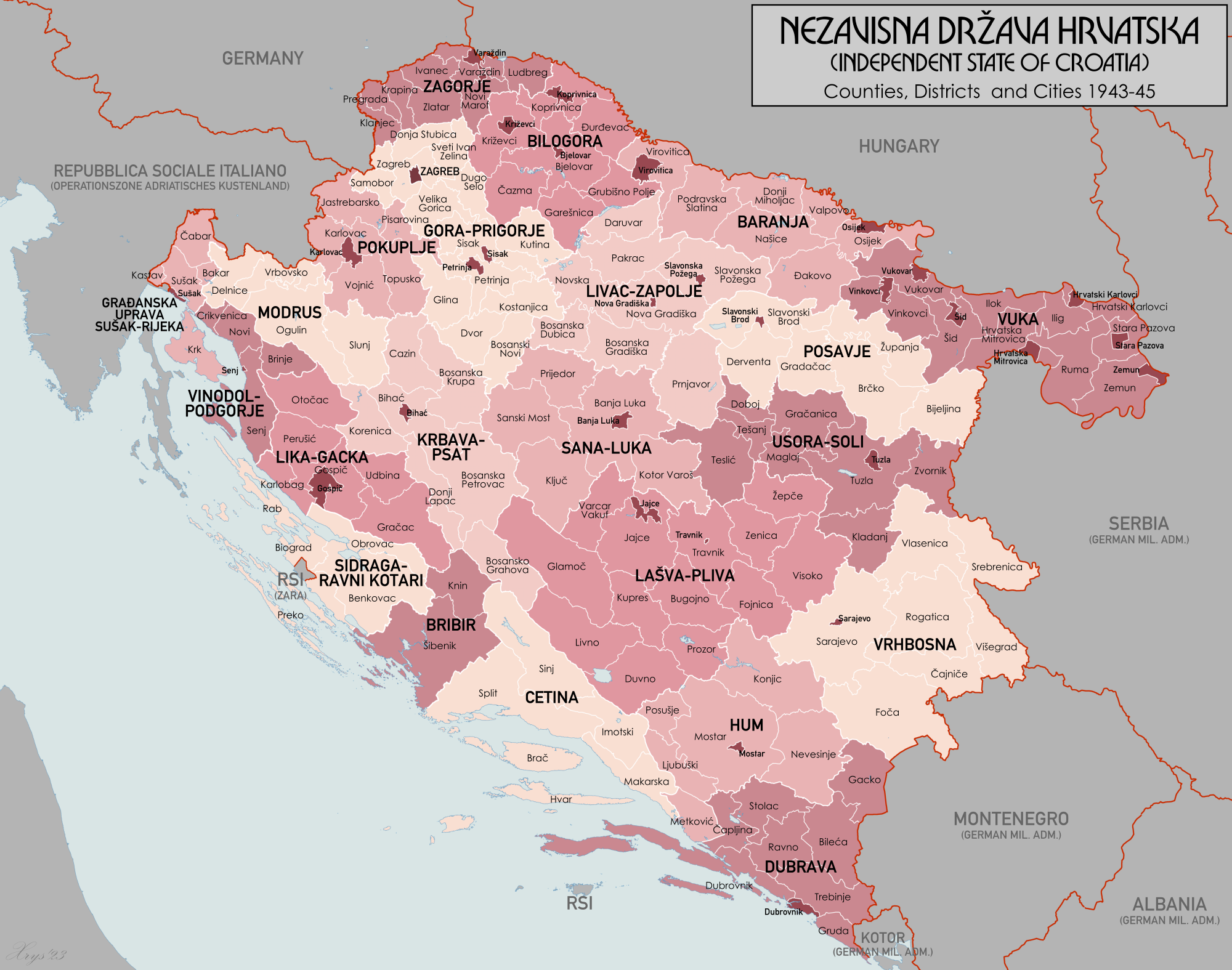
1943–1945

County	Districts	Cities
Baranja	Đakovo, Donji Miholjac, Našice, Osijek, Podravska Slatina, Valpovo, Virovitica	Osijek, Virovitica
Bilogora	Bjelovar, Čazma, Garešnica, Đurđevac, Grubišno Polje, Koprivnica, Križevci	Bjelovar, Koprivnica, Križevci
Bribir	Knin, Šibenik	
Cetina	Brač, Hvar, Imotski, Makarska, Sinj, Split	
Dubrava	Bileća, Čapljina, Dubrovnik, Gacko, Gruda. Ravno, Stolac, Trebinje	Dubrovnik
Gora-Prigorje	Bosanski Novi, Donja Stubica, Dugo Selo, Dvor, Glina, Kostajnica, Kutina, Petrinja, Samobor, Sisak, Sveti Ivan Zelina, Topusko, Velika Gorica, Zagreb	Petrinja, Sisak
Hum	Konjic, Ljubuški, Metković, Mostar, Nevesinje, Posušje	Mostar
Krbava-Psat	Bihać, Bosanska Krupa, Bosansko Grahovo, Bosanski Petrovac, Cazin, Donji Lapac, Korenica	Bihać
Lašva-Pliva	Bugojno, Duvno, Fojnica, Glamoč, Jajce, Kupres, Livno, Prozor, Varcar Vakuf, Travnik, Visoko, Zenica, Žepče	Jajce, Travnik
Lika-Gacka	Gospić, Gračac, Karlobag, Otočac, Perušić, Udbina	Gospić
Livac-Zapolje	Bosanska Dubica, Bosanska Gradiška, Daruvar, Nova Gradiška, Novska, Pakrac, Slavonska Požega, Prnjavor	Nova Gradiška, Slavonska Požega
Modruš	Delnice, Ogulin, Slunj, Vrbovsko	
Pokupje	Jastrebarsko, Karlovac, Pisarovina, Vojnić	
Posavje	Bijeljina, Brčko, Slavonski Brod, Derventa, Gradačac, Županja	Slavonski Brod
Sana-Luka	Banja Luka, Ključ, Kotor Varoš, Prijedor, Sanski Most	Banja Luka
Sidraga Ravni-Kotari	Benkovac, Biograd, Obrovac, Preko, Rab	
Usora-Soli	Doboj, Gračanica, Kladanj, Maglaj, Teslić, Tešanj, Tuzla, Zvornik	Tuzla
Vinodol-Podgorje	Brinje, Kraljevica, Novi, Senj	Senj
Vrhbosna	Čajniče, Foča, Rogatica, Sarajevo, Srebrenica, Višegrad, Vlasenica	Sarajevo
Vuka	Hrvatska Mitrovica, Hrvatski Karlovci, Ilok, Irig, Ruma, Stara Pazova, Šid, Vinkovci, Vukovar, Zemun	Hrvatska Mitrovica, Hrvatski Karlovci, Stara Pazova, Šid, Vinkovci, Vukovar, Zemun
Zagorje	Ivanec, Klanjec, Krapina, Ludbreg, Novi Marof, Pregrada, Varaždin, Zlatar	Varaždin
Građanska Uprava Sušak-Rijeka, OZAK	Bakar, Čabar, Kastav, Krk, Sušak	Rijeka
