= Posavje District (Independent State of Croatia) =

Posavje District Velika župa Posavje
- District of the Independent State of Croatia
- 1941–1945
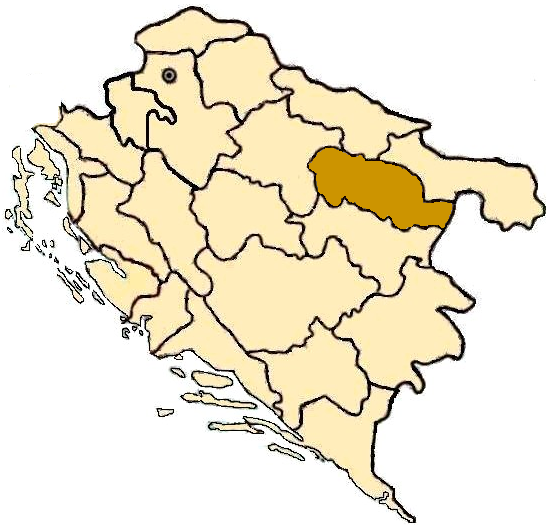
- Posavje District within the Independent State of Croatia (after September 1943).
- Capital: Brod na Savi ^{a}
- Area
  - 1941: 5,554 km^{2} (2,144 sq mi)
- Population
  - 1941: 498,398
- History
  - Established: 1941
  - Disestablished: 1945
- Today part of: Croatia; Bosnia and Herzegovina
- a. Present day Slavonski Brod and Bosnian Brod.

The Posavje District (Croatian: Velika župa Posavje) was an administrative division of the Independent State of Croatia. It was made of the kotars of Brod, Županja, Brčko, Derventa, Gradačac and Bijeljina. Its capital was in Brod.

It had a population of 498,398 people in 1941. It had an area of 5,554 square kilometres.

== Prefects ==
- Vladimir Sabolić (1941 – June 1943)
- Muhamed Omerović (June 1943 – 1944)
- Dragutin Urumović (1944–1945)
