= Kaniža Gospićka =

- Village
- Interactive map of Kaniža Gospićka
- Location within Croatia
- Coordinates: 44.54078°N 15.34971°E
- Country: Croatia
- County: Lika-Senj
- Municipality: Gospić

Area
  - Total: 0.98 sq mi (2.53 km^{2})

Population (2021)
  - Total: 347
  - Density: 355/sq mi (137/km^{2})
- Time zone: UTC+1 (CET)
  - Summer (DST): UTC+2 (CEST)

Kaniža Gospićka is a village in the City of Gospić, Croatia. It is connected by the D25 road.
