= Dina Merhav =

Israeli sculptor (1936–2022)

- דינה מרחב
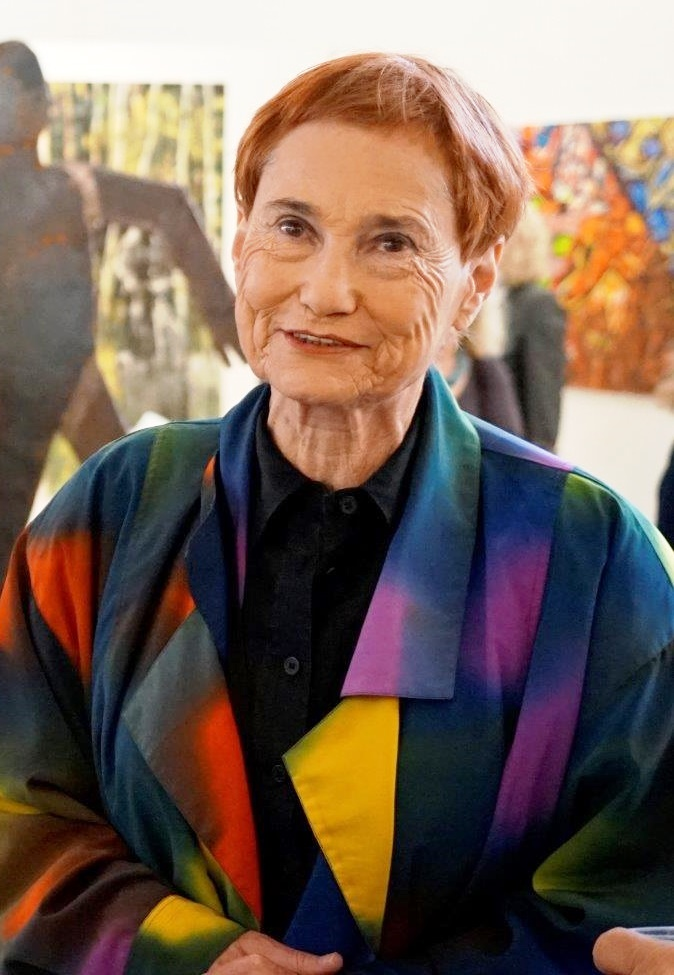
- Born: Dina Gross; March 9, 1936; Vinkovci, Yugoslavia
- Died: October 19, 2022 (aged 86); Ein Hod, Israel
- Occupation: Sculptor
- Parents: Zlatko Gross; Steffi Wachster

Dina Merhav (née Gross; Hebrew: דינה מרחב; March 9, 1936 – October 19, 2022) was a Yugoslav-born Israeli sculptor.

== Biography ==
Dina Gross (later Merhav) was born in Vinkovci to a Yugoslav Jewish family of Zlatko and Steffi Gross. During World War II her father, as a Royal Yugoslav Army officer, was captured and imprisoned in a war camp in Germany. Merhav, her mother and rest of the family managed to escape to Split, from there to Switzerland through Italy. After the war they returned to Yugoslavia to be reunited with Dina's father. In 1949, the entire family immigrated to Israel. In Israel she studied and graduated from the Bezalel Academy of Art and Design, Jerusalem.

Merhav died on October 19, 2022, at the age of 86.

== Art career ==
After graduation Merhav worked as a graphic designer. She taught graphic design and sculpture at the WIZO Haifa Academy of Design and Education, at the art department of University of Haifa and at the Technion – Israel Institute of Technology in Haifa. From 1984 to 1985 Merhav studied sculpture at the University of Haifa. In 1984 she attended the stone sculpture seminar in Pietrasanta, Italy.

Merhav created soaring sculptures of birds and angels from scrap iron.

== Awards and recognition ==
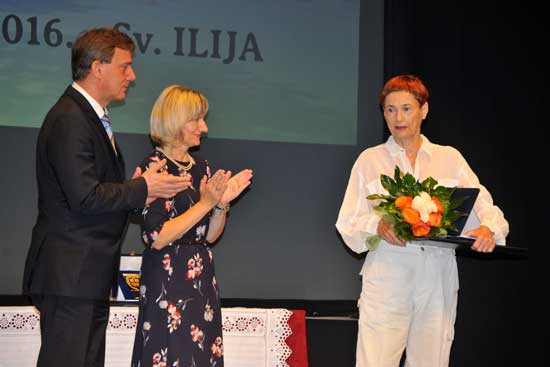
Merhav receiving award

In 1998 the city of Haifa awarded Merhav the "Herman Struck Best Artist of the Year" Prize. Merhav frequently visited her birth country and exhibited in the various museums across the Croatia. In 2013 Merhav opened an exhibition "Ptice u letu" (Birds in Flight) in Zagreb. She also published the poetry book "For You With Love". Merhav worked in her sculpture studio in moshav Nir Etzion and lived in the nearby Ein Hod artists' village.

== See also ==
- Israeli art
