= Lukovo Šugarje =

- Village
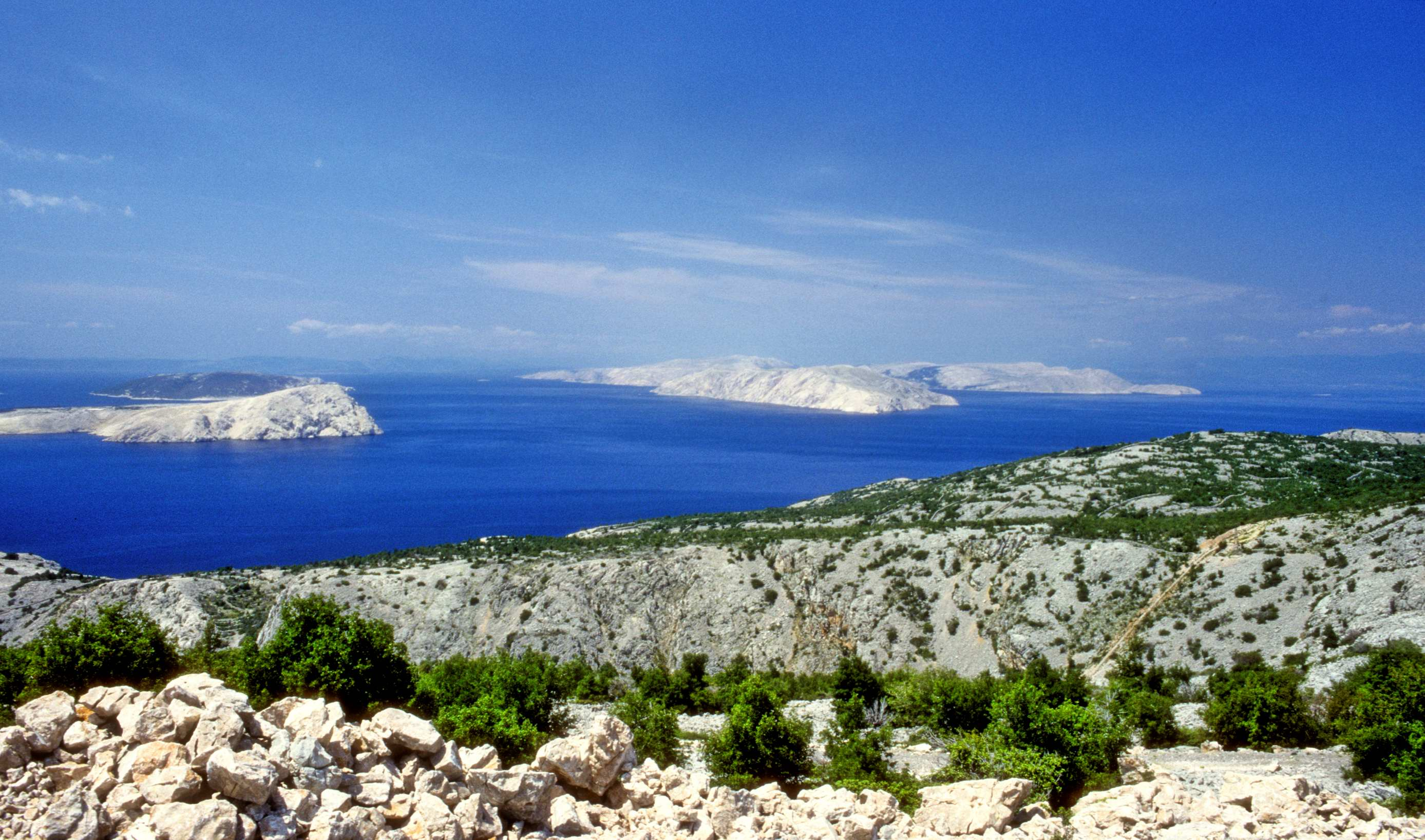
- Interactive map of Lukovo Šugarje
- Location within Croatia
- Coordinates: 44°26′N 15°12′E
- Country: Croatia
- County: Lika-Senj
- Municipality: Karlobag

Area
  - Total: 79.5 km^{2} (30.7 sq mi)

Population (2021)
  - Total: 100
  - Density: 1.3/km^{2} (3.3/sq mi)
- Time zone: UTC+1 (CET)
  - Summer (DST): UTC+2 (CEST)

Lukovo Šugarje is a village in Croatia. It is connected by the D8 highway.
