= Marko Došen =

Croatian politician (1859–1944)

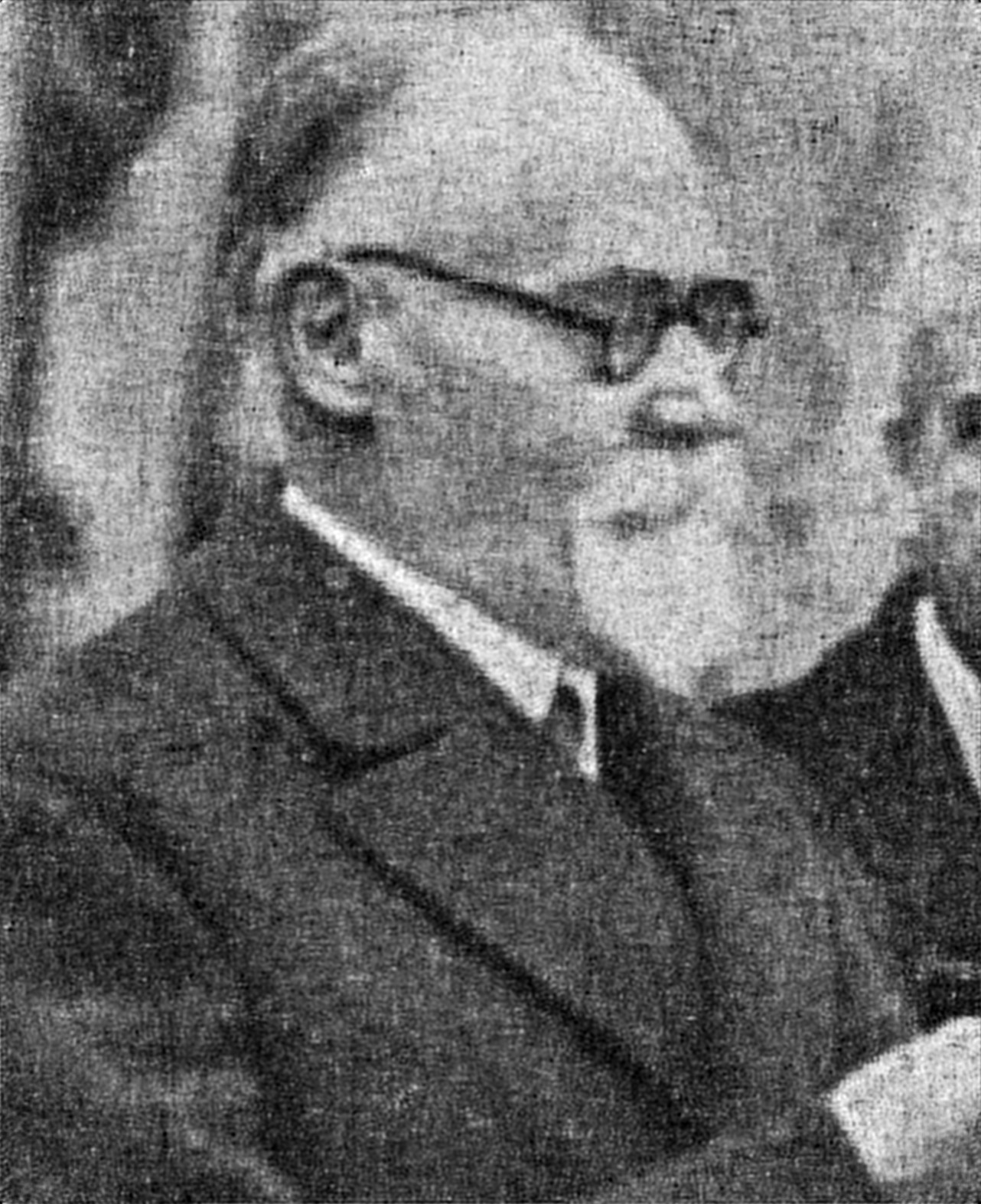
Marko Došen in 1933

Marko Došen (7 July 1859 – 7 September 1944) was a writer, who later became a Croatian Ustaše politician.

== Biography ==
Born in Mušaluk (now part of Gospić), Došen finished elementary school in Lika and one grade of gymnasium in Bjelovar. He entered into trade, but in 1890 moved to Russia where he opened a bookstore in Saint Petersburg. Together with a Russian historian surnamed Filipov, he published the book Hrvati i njihova borba s Austrijom (Croats and their struggle against Austria). He returned to Gospić in 1893 and the following year started his weekly magazine Hrvat which he edited for ten years.

He was a member of Starčević's Party of Rights in the Croatian Parliament from 1913 to 1918. Since 1918 he was a member of the Croatian Republican Peasant Party (HRSS). He was elected into the national assembly of the Kingdom of Serbs, Croats and Slovenes in 1920, 1923 and 1925.

After the Pašić–Radić agreement in 1925 he ended his association with Radić's HRSS. After King Alexander declared a royal dictatorship on 6 January 1929, Došen became a member of the Ustaša, a Croatian revolutionary organization. With Andrija Artuković, Došen was the main organizer of the Velebit Uprising in 1932. After the proclamation of the Independent State of Croatia he returned to the country from Hungary, where he had lived since 1934. In 1942 he became the president of the Croatian Parliament. Although the Parliament only met a few times within the first year, he retained his position as its president until his death.

Marko Došen died in September 1944 at the age of 85 and was buried at the Mirogoj Cemetery with full military and state honors.
