= Brušane =

- Village
- Interactive map of Brušane
- Location within Croatia
- Coordinates: 44.50077°N 15.27019°E
- Country: Croatia
- Region: Lika
- County: Lika-Senj
- Municipality: Gospić

Area
  - Total: 13.67 sq mi (35.40 km^{2})

Population (2021)
  - Total: 126
  - Density: 9.22/sq mi (3.56/km^{2})
- Time zone: UTC+1 (CET)
  - Summer (DST): UTC+2 (CEST)

Brušane is a village in the City of Gospić, Croatia. It is connected by the D25 road.

== History ==
The present church of St. Martin was built in 1854. It was burned down on 14th of July 1942 during the Second World War and was rebuilt in 1962. In 2009, a copper roof was installed, and the bell tower and façade were renovated.
