= Counties of the Independent State of Croatia =

The great counties or grand governorates (Croatian: velika župa, pl. velike župe, German: Großgespanschaft) were the primary territorial subdivisions of the Independent State of Croatia. In 1941–1943, there were twenty-two of them, with the capital city of Zagreb serving as the twenty-third.

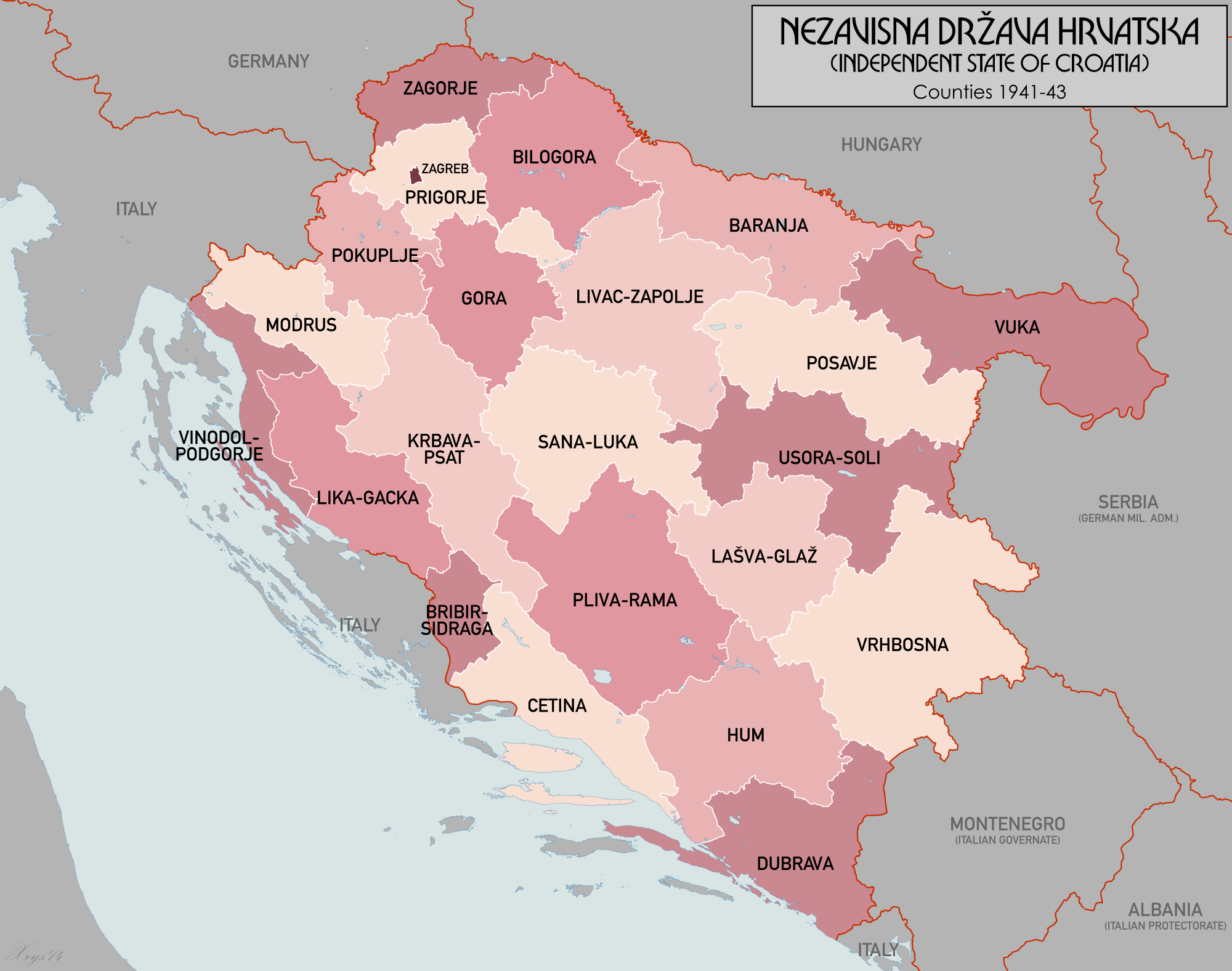
1941–1943

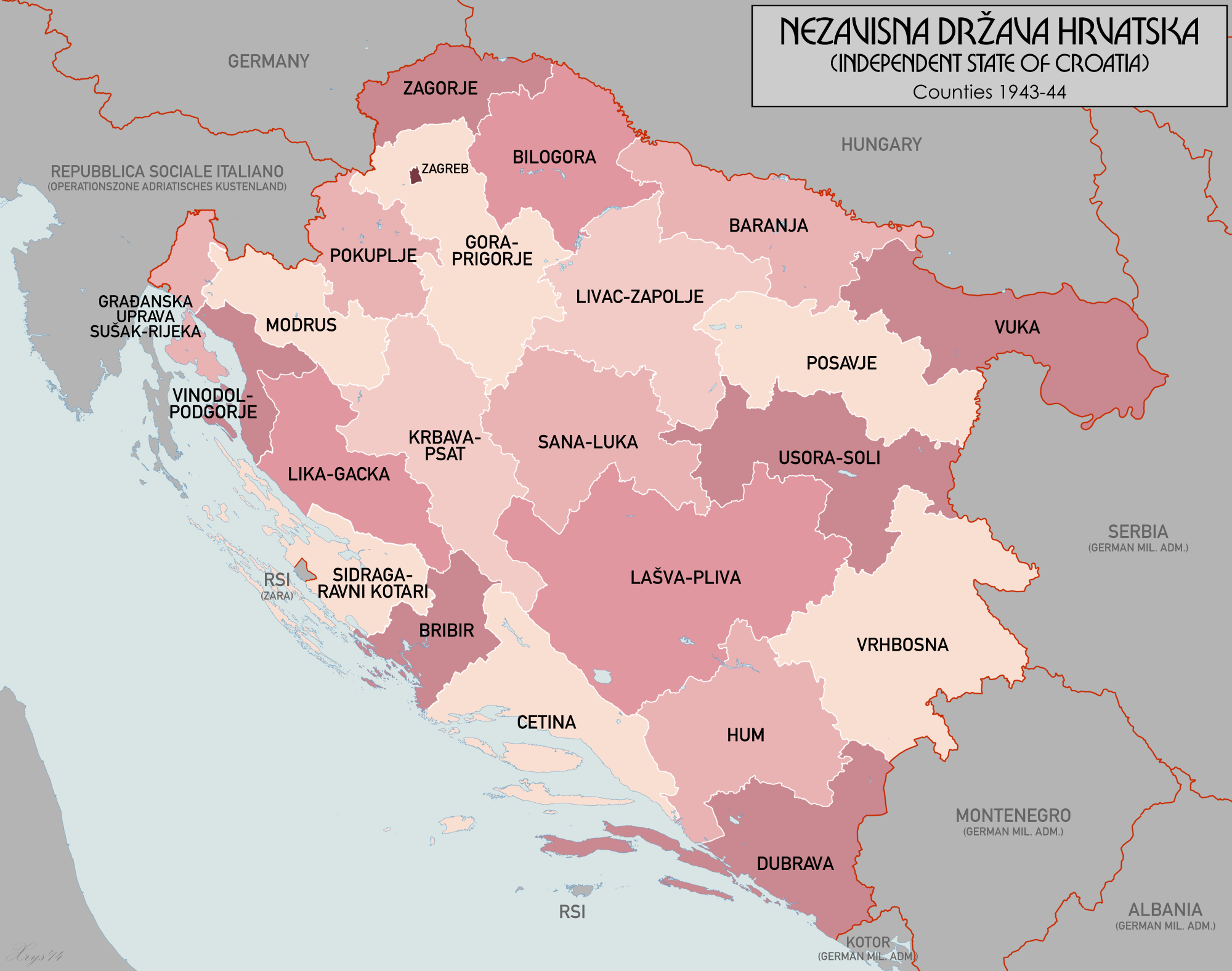
1943–1944

| County | Capital |
|---|---|
| Baranja | Osijek |
| Bilogora | Bjelovar |
| Bribir and Sidraga | Knin |
| Cetina | Omiš |
| Dubrava | Dubrovnik |
| Gora | Petrinja |
| Hum | Mostar |
| Krbava - Psat | Bihać |
| Lašva and Glaž | Travnik |
| Lika and Gacka | Gospić |
| Livac and Zapolje | Nova Gradiška |
| Modruš | Ogulin |
| Pliva and Rama | Jajce |
| Pokupje | Karlovac |
| Posavje | Slavonski Brod |
| Prigorje | Zagreb |
| Sana and Luka | Banja Luka |
| Usora and Soli | Tuzla |
| Vinodol and Podgorje | Senj |
| Vrhbosna | Sarajevo |
| Vuka | Vukovar |
| Zagorje | Varaždin |
| City of Zagreb | Zagreb |

== See also ==
- Districts of the Independent State of Croatia
