= Budak, Lika-Senj County =

Budak
- Village
- Location within Croatia
- Coordinates: 44.58804°N 15.395749°E
- Country: Croatia
- County: Lika
- County: Lika-Senj
- Municipality: Gospić

Area
  - Total: 5.0 km^{2} (1.9 sq mi)

Population (2021)
  - Total: 126
  - Density: 25/km^{2} (65/sq mi)
- Time zone: UTC+1 (CET)
  - Summer (DST): UTC+2 (CEST)

Budak is a village in the Gospić municipality in the Lika region in central Croatia. It is located near Gospić, connected by the D25 highway.

The 1712–14 census of Lika and Krbava registered 237 inhabitants, out of whom 114 were Catholic Carniolans, 45 were Catholic Croats, 45 were Catholic Bunjevci, 15 were unknown and 11 Catholicized "Turks".

== Castle ==
Two castles were known to exist at the time of the reconquest in September 1685 and June 1689, of which the older one may have been built by the Lagodušić family in the pre-Turkish period (of this Pavičić is certain). The older castle was built atop a hill, while the younger one was built to its south on the plain, along the Lika. The younger one is likely that mentioned in 1643 as having 10 soldiers and a commander with a daily salary of 20 akçe. The inhabitants of the younger fortification surrendered to Leopold von Herberstein without significant resistance upon learning of the fall of Bilaj, after the dizdar was promised two horses.

In during the reconquest of Lika in 1685, the castle defended itself so well that the soldiers nicknamed it "Little Buda":

This time the raid was urgent, so that I went there on the 28th of the previous day, with your orders to go to Budak and Perušić. Budak is only an hour and a half from Belaj. It is a settlement which defended itself so strongly 5 years ago that it was called Little Offen, lying on a rocky place, so firmly on the Lika river that, against water, it is safe enough. There is a fence and a rampart on the land, in turn a wall and palisades, and above them high chardaks and a fortress are built. But when they saw that Belaj had surrendered and the troops were ready to arrive at Novi, they did not put up too strong a resistance. (Note: Disse zeithung des sucurs mahete eillen, also das ich auss befelich ihr exc. den 28ten vor tag Budakh vnd Peruschiz aufzufuertern, dorthin gangen. Budakh ist nur andert halb stund von Belay. Ist ein staettel, so sich vor 5 jahr dermassn gewehret, dass man sie khlein Offen genenet, lieht an einen felsigen orth, so fest auf der Lica fluss, dass selben gegen den wasser genuegsamb sicher ist. Gegen den landt hat es ein zaun vnd prustwoehr, einwending ein maur vnd palisatedn vnd vber selben hohe tschartakhen sambt ein guetten absint. Wie sie aber gesehen, das Belay sich ergeben, die stukh auh bereit auf Noui ankhumben, haben sie sich nicht gar starkh widersezet.)

— General quartermaster Wasserhoffen, Relation meiner raiss auf Carlobagh
