= RAVSIGUR =

Croatian supervisory department in the Ministry of Internal Affairs

RAVSIGUR, a shortening of Ravnateljstvo za javni red i sigurnost ('Directorate for Public Order and Security'), later known as GRAVSIGUR in 1943, was a supervisory department in the Ministry of Internal Affairs of the Independent State of Croatia (NDH). The purpose of the department was to supervise police activities in Croatia. The system was similar in concept to that used in Germany under the Third Reich.
