= Karlobag =

- Municipality
- Općina Karlobag; Municipality of Karlobag
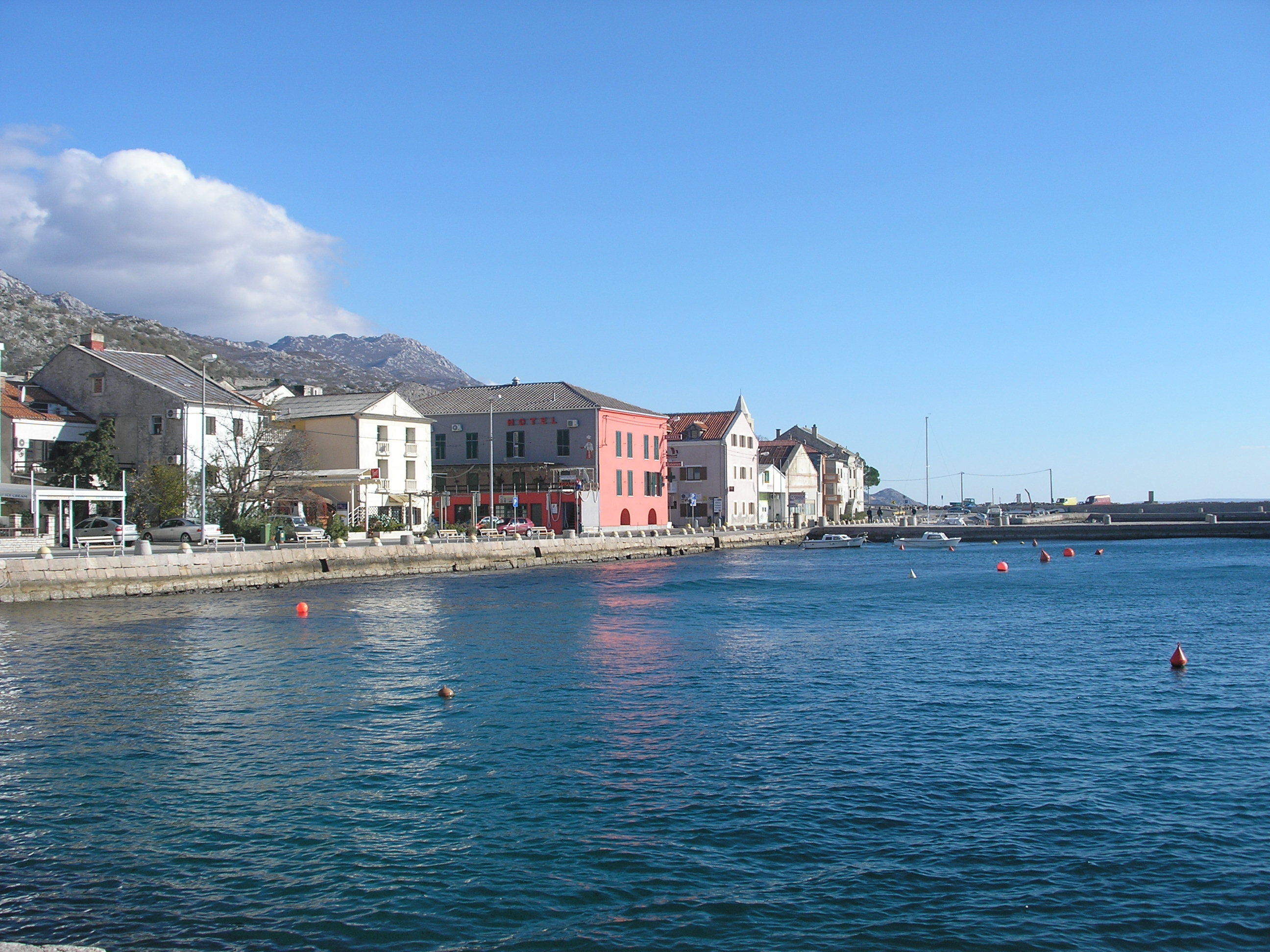

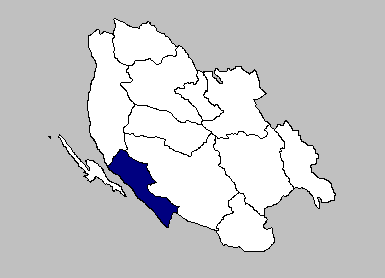
- Karlobag municipality within Lika-Senj County
- Interactive map of Karlobag
- Location within Croatia
- Coordinates: 44°31′29″N 15°04′25″E
- Country: Croatia
- County: Lika-Senj County

Government
  - Mayor: Ivan Tomljenović (Independent)

Area
  - Municipality: 280.8 km^{2} (108.4 sq mi)
  - Urban: 0.7 km^{2} (0.27 sq mi)

Population (2021)
  - Municipality: 780
  - Density: 2.8/km^{2} (7.2/sq mi)
  - Urban: 368
  - Urban density: 530/km^{2} (1,400/sq mi)
- Demonym(s): Karlobažanin (male); Karlobažanka (female)
- Time zone: UTC+1 (CET)
  - Summer (DST): UTC+2 (CEST)
- Postal code: 53288 Karlobag
- Vehicle registration: GS
- Website: karlobag.hr

Karlobag is a village and a seaside municipality on the Adriatic coast in Croatia, located at the foot of the Velebit mountain, overlooking the island of Pag, west of Gospić and south of Senj. The Gacka river also runs through the area.

== Geography ==
Today, chief occupations are fishing and tourism. Main activities include boating and hiking, as Karlobag is known for its excellent trails. The Velebit mountains rising above Karlobag have been declared the a world biosphere reserve, currently the only one in Croatia.

== Climate ==
Between 1993 and 2016, the highest temperature recorded at the local weather station was 38.7 °C (101.7 °F), on 19 July 2007. The coldest temperature was −11.9 °C (10.6 °F), on 8 February 2012.

== History ==
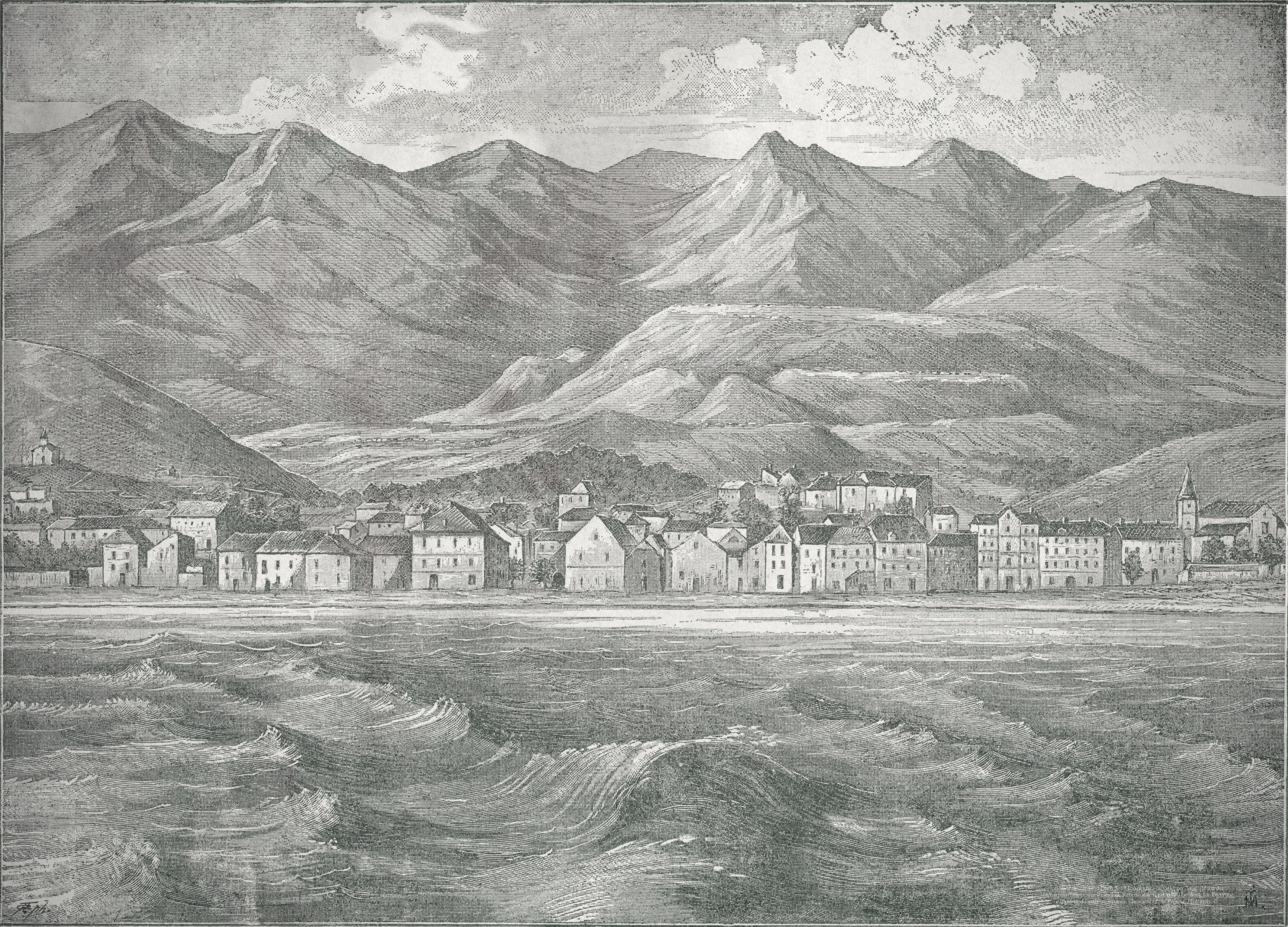
Sketch of Karlobag (1880)

The town of Karlobag is first mentioned in 1387, as "Bag", founded by the Holy Roman Emperor Charles IV, Holy Roman Emperor in the 14th century, and is thus named after him (Karlo being the Croatian variant of Charles.) It has such strong connections with the interior that its town centre is completely different from other Mediterranean settlements.

Pliny and Ptolemy mentioned it as the Roman "Vegia". During migration period Vegia collapsed, but in the 7th century the Croats built a new settlement to the west of the Roman town, called Skrisa (Opidum Scrissi) which was later known as Bag, the seat of the noble Tugomirić family, then of Gusić-Kurjaković and Mogorović-Disislavić families.

Kurjaković, the duke of Krbava, took over Bag in 1322 and on November 2, 1387. gave Bag the status of a city. At the end of the XV. century, Bag fell under the rule of King Matthias Corvinus, and in 1493 it fell under the rule of Ivan Karlović Krbavski.

The Turkish invasion of Lika completely changed the course of this town's development. In 1525 it was completely destroyed by the Turks, leaving only a fortress with a small military presence. While Venice was considering whether to completely abandon or rebuild the town, the people of Senj turned to the Austrian Archduke Karl (the founder of the "Vojna Krajina", the military border area) and he built a new town in 1579, which, from 1580 on became known as Karlobag. However, just as the town had been restored (1592) the Venetians took over the fortress and destroyed the town. Right up until 1683 Karlobag was inhabited only by military units.

Another Habsburg ruler (also called Karl) was responsible for Karlobag's further development, the last male member of the family and father of Maria Theresa, Charles VI. His interest in this town was the result of his so-called "Adriatic orientation", for before him Austria had shown little interest in the Adriatic. He has a harbour built and planned a road to Gospić. His grandson Joseph II joined Karlobag to the "Vojna Krajina" in 1776 and in 1786 built another road over Velebit. During Napoleon's rule, Karlobag also suffered shelling from English warships, in 1813.

Until 1918, Karlobag (named Carlobago before 1850, later Karlopago) was part of the (Kingdom of Croatia-Slavonia after the compromise of 1867), in the Croatian Military Frontier, Likaner Regiment N°I.

== Demographics ==
In 2021, the municipality had 780 residents in the following 14 settlements:

- Barić Draga, population 72
- Baške Oštarije, population 28
- Cesarica, population 110
- Crni Dabar, population 0
- Došen Dabar, population 0
- Karlobag, population 368
- Konjsko, population 2
- Kućišta Cesarička, population 10
- Ledenik Cesarički, population 16
- Lukovo Šugarje, population 100
- Ravni Dabar, population 0
- Staništa, population 7
- Sušanj Cesarički, population 9
- Vidovac Cesarički, population 58
Karlobag: Population trends 1857–2021
v

population	2803	3461	3288	3445	3991	4484	3767	3320	2737	2584	2107	1570	1192	1039	1019	917	780
	1857	1869	1880	1890	1900	1910	1921	1931	1948	1953	1961	1971	1981	1991	2001	2011	2021

Sources: Croatian Bureau of Statistics publications

In 2011, Croats made up the majority at 94.33%.

== Landmarks ==
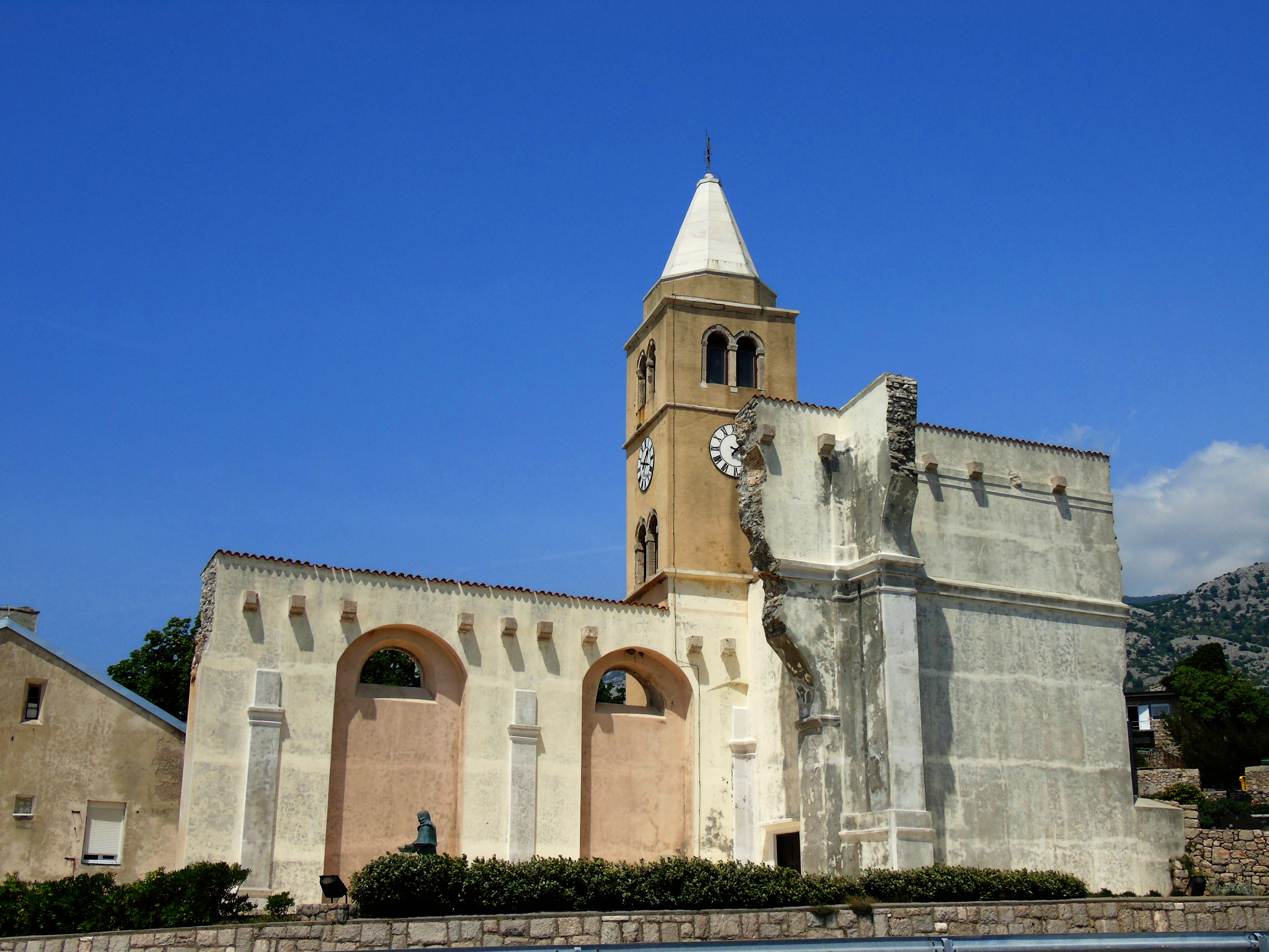
Church of St. Charles Borromeo

The town itself has several historical landmarks, especially the 1713 Capuchin Monastery which has many old paintings, the most important monument of culture in the town. A small exhibition of ecclesiastical art, an archive and a library is arranged in the monastery. Also other churches, most dating back to the 17th and 18th centuries.

On the hill above town are the ruins of a Middle Ages fortress called Fortica, and the baroque church of Saint Charles of Borromeo (1776), built on the site of a church of 1615.

The town is also home to a monument to the Croatian linguist Šime Starčević.

== See also ==
- Zadar
- Starigrad
