= Croatian Peasant Party during World War II =

History of a political party in World War II-Yugoslavia

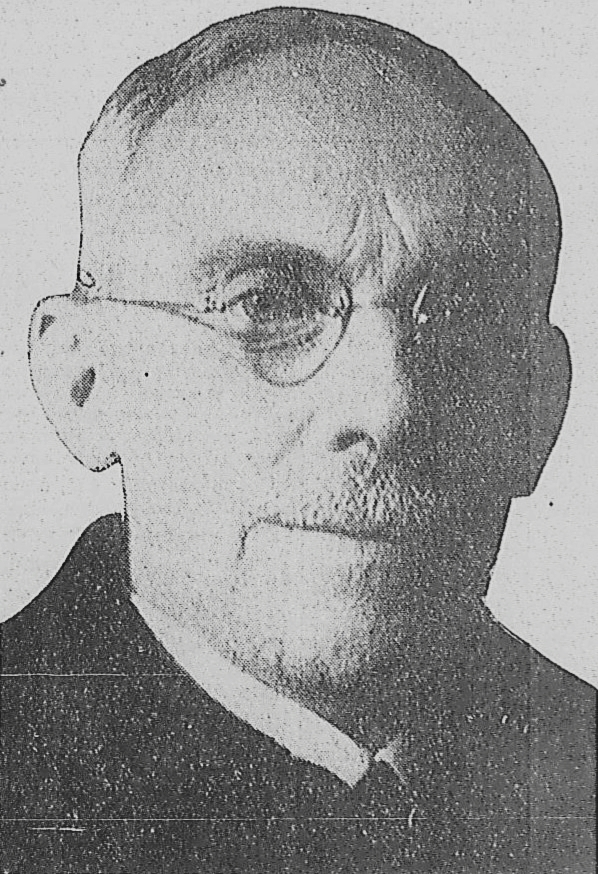
President of the Croatian Peasant Party Vladko Maček spent most of the World War II under house arrest.

During World War II, the Croatian Peasant Party (Hrvatska seljačka stranka, HSS) splintered into several factions pursuing different policies and alliances. Prior to the German invasion of Yugoslavia, it was the most powerful political party among ethnic Croats, controlled the administration and police in Banovina of Croatia, and commanded two paramilitary organisations. After the successful invasion of the Kingdom of Yugoslavia in April 1941, Nazi Germany proposed that HSS leader Vladko Maček could rule Croatia as a puppet state. He declined, but the Ustaše agreed and proclaimed the Independent State of Croatia (Nezavisna država Hrvatska, NDH). Under duress, Maček called on Croats to support the regime. A splinter of the HSS and all HSS-controlled infrastructure went over to the Ustaše.

The Communist Party of Yugoslavia (KPJ) and its nominally independent branch, the Communist Party of Croatia (KPH) established the Yugoslav Partisans as armed resistance against the NDH. Maček believed that the Western Allies would prevail and would not allow a Communist regime to be established in Yugoslavia. Consequently, he preferred to wait until a favourable moment to return to power, while maintaining distance from both the Ustaše and the Communists. Another group of HSS members opposed this strategy and broke with the party to cooperate with the KPH and join the Partisans. The KPH welcomed the HSS faction while working to sever ties between the HSS members within Partisan ranks and Maček.

The faction loyal to Maček plotted to take over the NDH's regular army – the Croatian Home Guard, assuming support from Home Guards officers who supported an alliance with the Western Allies. The plotters expected an Allied landing in Dalmatia, which they intended to use to negotiate as an equal party and prevent the establishment of a Communist regime in Yugoslavia after the war. The scheme failed because the United Kingdom had already decided to support the Partisans. In response, the Maček faction tried to negotiate directly with the KPH, but the talks broke down. Instead, the British helped strike the Vis Agreement between the KPJ and Partisan leader Josip Broz Tito and the Yugoslav government-in-exile led by HSS member and former Ban of Croatia Ivan Šubašić, providing for power-sharing between the KPJ and prewar democratic parties.

At the end of the war, the provisional coalition government came under control of the KPJ and the non-Communist ministers resigned before the 1945 Yugoslavian parliamentary election, which was boycotted by the non-Communist opposition. Maček fled Yugoslavia and continued political work from abroad, while the HSS was suppressed in the country and became inactive by 1948.

== Background ==
The Croatian Peasant Party (Hrvatska seljačka stranka, HSS) was the main political party of Croats in the Kingdom of Yugoslavia. The HSS was persecuted by Yugoslav authorities due to the party's opposition to political unitarism advocated by the government. Prompted by the failure of the government to secure the rule of law and public order, the HSS established the Croatian Peasant Defence (HSZ) as a party paramilitary force in 1936. The force was established to protect Croats against paramilitaries supported or tolerated by the regime. The force was also designed as a response to Ustaše challenge for dominance among Croats as a force capable of providing physical protection following the Velebit uprising. It was meant to demonstrate that the HSS is not a pacifist organisation resigned to passivity. In cities, the HSZ operated under the name of Croatian Civil Defence.

== Invasion of Yugoslavia ==
Yugoslavia was occupied and partitioned by the Axis powers in April 1941.

Following the 1939 German invasion of Poland, the Cvetković–Maček government declared its neutrality. After the Axis Tripartite Pact was joined by neighboring countries of Hungary, Romania on 20 and 23 November 1940 respectively, and by Bulgaria on 1 March 1941, Yugoslavia followed their example on 25 March 1941 and joined the alliance. Two days later, the government was overthrown and replaced by a new one led by General Dušan Simović who withdrew Yugoslavia from the Tripartite Pact. Aiming to improve support for his cabinet among ethnic Croats, Simović continued to cooperate with the HSS and expanded the authority of Banovina of Croatia to include the police and armed forces. As a result, the president of the HSS and deputy prime minister of Yugoslavia Vladko Maček to consider disbanding HSS paramilitaries. At the time, the HSS was the most popular political party in Croatia, and the party's ideology included commitment to pacifism.

In retribution for Yugoslavia's withdrawal from the Tripartite Pact, German dictator Adolf Hitler planned to partition the country and annex parts of its territory to Nazi Germany and its allies. Italian dictator Benito Mussolini supported this as he wanted to annex parts of Yugoslavia to Fascist Italy. The German plans for the breakup of Yugoslavia also envisaged some form of autonomy for Croats to exploit Croatian dissatisfaction with Yugoslav rule. Hitler offered Hungary the opportunity to absorb Croatia on 27 March 1941, apparently referring to the territories largely corresponding with the former Kingdom of Croatia-Slavonia, but Regent Miklós Horthy declined the offer. Days later, Germany decided to establish a Croatian puppet state.

=== Establishment of the Independent State of Croatia ===
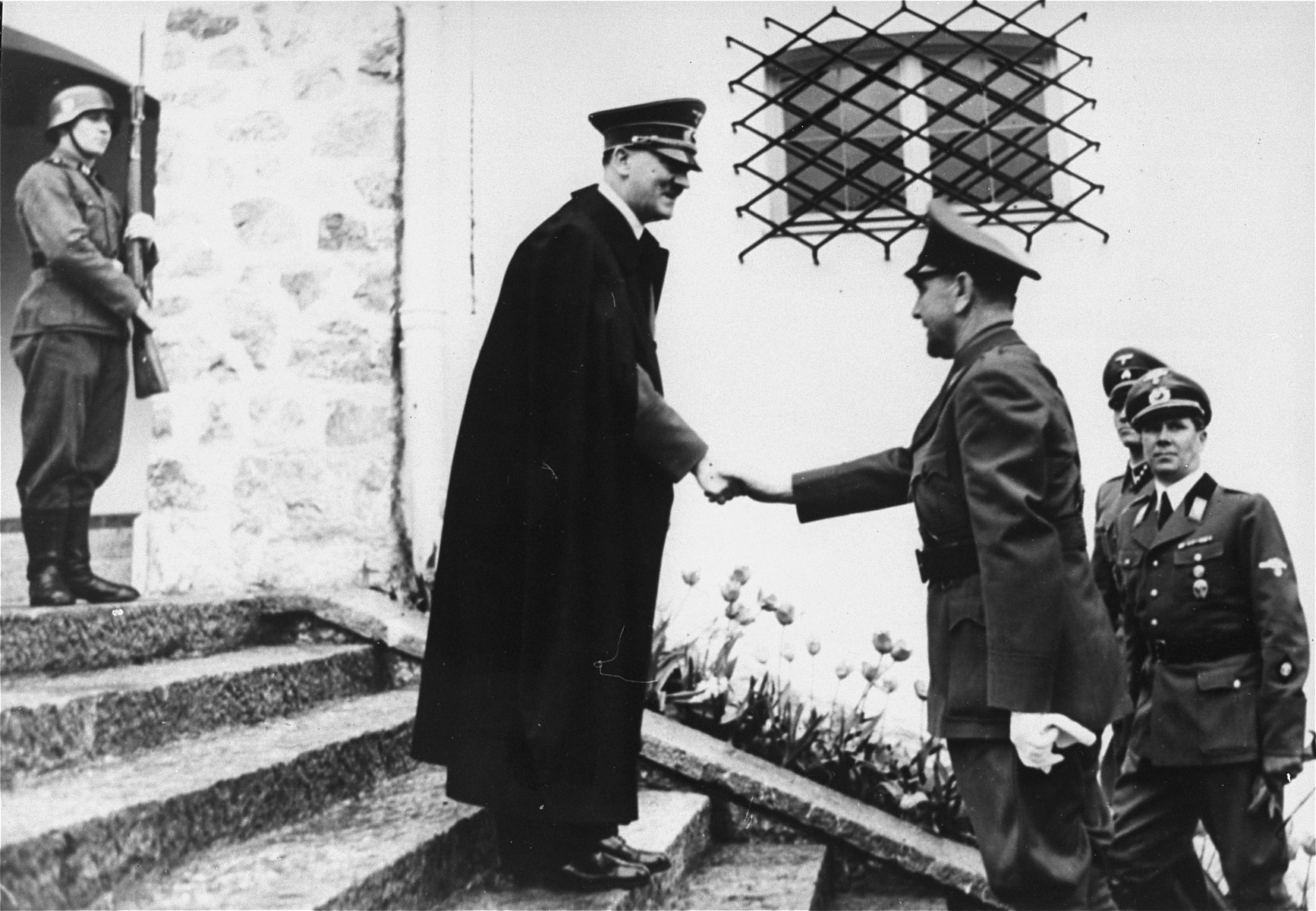
Ante Pavelić (shown visiting Adolf Hitler) was installed as the head of the Independent State of Croatia in 1941.

Hitler sought the advice of Alfred Rosenberg, the foreign policy advisor of the Nazi Party, on the establishment of a Croatian state. Rosenberg advised Hitler to offer Maček the leadership of such a state. The German delegation sent to Maček consisted of Foreign Minister Joachim von Ribbentrop's representatives Walter Malletke, SS Colonel Edmund Veesenmayer, and Alfred Freundt, the German consul in Zagreb. Maček declined the offer, and the position was reluctantly offered to the Italy-based Ustaše and their leader Ante Pavelić. On 8 April, Maček issued a statement urging order and discipline in the armed forces, without explicitly referencing Yugoslavia.

The Independent State of Croatia (Nezavisna Država Hrvatska, NDH) was declared on 10 April by former Austro-Hungarian Army Lieutenant Colonel and the leader of Ustaše in the country Slavko Kvaternik on the urging of Veesenmayer, as the German Army was approaching Zagreb. Maček issued another statement, made under duress, the same day calling for sincere cooperation with the new "nationalist movement" government. The statement delivered a significant part of the administration and police to the Ustaše virtually intact. Lightly armed HSS militias—the Peasant Guards and the Civic Guards—switched allegiance to the NDH, and several units helped disarm parts of the Royal Yugoslav Army. After the Ustaše established control, some of the militia units were absorbed by NDH armed forces, and others disbanded.

Maček thought the war was between major powers, and that "small [peoples] must shelter under a table". His policy was to wait for the Western Allies to liberate the country so the HSS could continue its work. Maček expected that the Soviet Union would be devastated to a degree where it could not control the post-war settlement and that the Western Allies would not tolerate a Communist regime in post-war Yugoslavia. He expected the country to be restored and expanded territorially and that Croatia would also gain territory. On 11 April, Maček moved to his estate in the village of Kupinec near Zagreb. Yugoslavia surrendered by the end of April, and King Peter II of Yugoslavia and the government fled the country. The decision to abandon organised armed resistance to the Axis powers left the Yugoslav government-in-exile in a weak position, a situation exacerbated by quarreling ministers who appeared united only in their anti-Communism. Maček's decision to resign his ministerial position, with the HSS secretary Juraj Krnjević taking his place, was resented by Serb ministers because it further reduced the prestige of the government. Two other HSS government ministers and close associates of Maček, Ivan Andres and Bariša Smoljan, also resigned their posts to remain in the country.

=== Armed resistance ===
With the Yugoslav defeat imminent, the Communist Party of Yugoslavia (Komunistička partija Jugoslavije, KPJ) instructed its 8,000 members to stockpile weapons in anticipation of armed resistance, which would spread, by the end of 1941 to all areas of the country except Vardar Macedonia. Building on its experience in clandestine operations across the country, the KPJ proceeded to organise the Yugoslav Partisans, as resistance fighters led by Josip Broz Tito. The KPJ believed that the German invasion of the Soviet Union had created favourable conditions for an uprising and its politburo founded the Supreme Headquarters of the Partisans with Tito as commander-in-chief on 27 June 1941. In the territory largely corresponding with the present-day Croatia, the Communist Party of Croatia (Komunistička partija Hrvatske, KPH) operated as a nominally independent party with 4000 members at the beginning of the war.

== Fracturing of the party ==
=== Maček's arrest ===
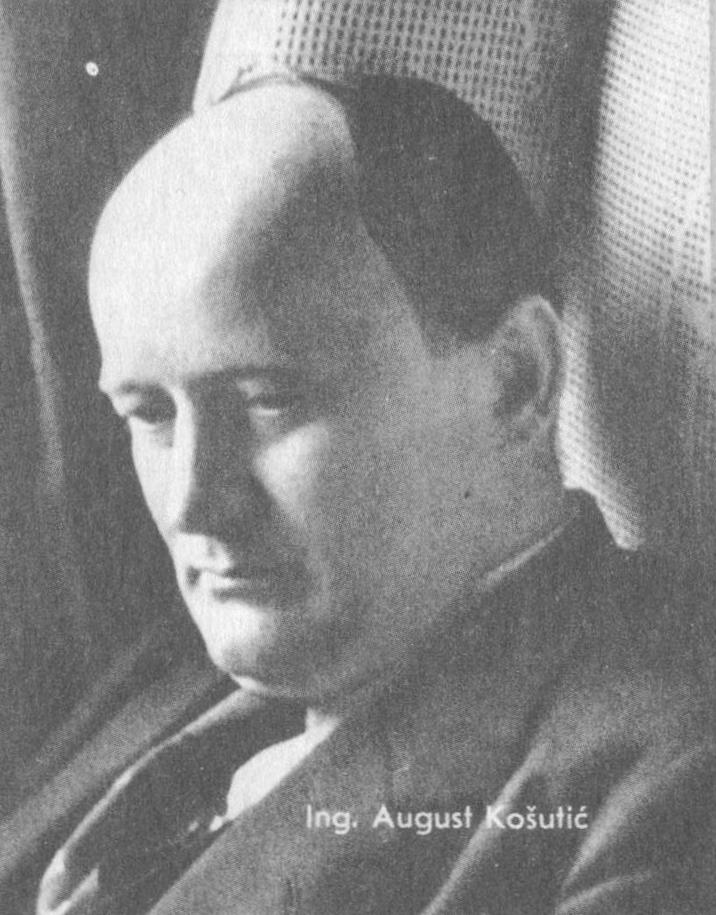
August Košutić led the HSS for much of the war, while Maček was under arrest.

The HSS split into different factions in 1941. Maček led the most influential faction of the party, which adopted the policy of passively waiting for liberation by the Western Allies and maintaining equal distance from both Ustaše and the KPJ-led Partisans. Other prominent HSS politicians adopted different approaches. A group including former Ban of Croatia Ivan Šubašić fled the country and joined the royal Yugoslav government-in-exile.

Another faction led by Janko Tortić and Marko Lamešić, who signed a resolution declaring the end of Yugoslavia and asking for German help, split off to support the Ustaše. At the local level, around 70 out of 7,000 HSS basic organisations switched allegiance to the NDH. In addition to fracturing of its leadership, the HSS's internal structure was formally disbanded after the NDH banned the party in June 1941. The effort to absorb the (former) HSS members into the Ustaše peaked on 10 August, when 126 HSS party members announced that they were joining the Ustaše. The Ustaše had encouraged their supporters to join and subvert the HSS from within since the August 1939 Cvetković–Maček Agreement allowing the HSS to join the Yugoslav cabinet. The Ustaše opposed any cooperation with the Yugoslav government and declared that Maček was a traitor. His position deteriorated when an envoy of the Plenipotentiary General to the NDH Edmund Glaise-Horstenau visited him in Kupinec in late summer or early autumn to see if he would replace Pavelić. Afraid that Germany or Italy would install Maček as head of the NDH or, alternately, Maček declaring his opposition to the NDH regime, the Ustaše ordered that Maček be taken to the Jasenovac concentration camp on 15 October. His imprisonment virtually ended defections of HSS supporters to the Ustaše movement.

The Ustaše convened the Sabor (the Croatian Parliament) on 23 February 1942 to expand support for the regime and declare the NDH to be a continuation of Croatian statehood. The assembly members were not elected. Invitations to attend were sent to, among others, HSS founders and lifetime members of the HSS general committee, all members of the Croatian Sabor sitting in 1918 and all Yugoslav parliament members elected in 1938 unless they "erred against the advancement of the NDH or the honour or reputation of the Croatian people". The invitations were sent to 93 HSS members, 60 of whom accepted. Some of the respondents thought participation might secure a more stable political environment or improve the HSS' position. A letter was sent to the NDH government by 39 of them protesting Maček's arrest. In March, Maček was moved from Jasenovac back to his estate in Kupinec where he was placed under house arrest. There he maintained intermittent secret contacts with deputy president of the HSS August Košutić and several other party leaders.

=== Magovac's faction ===
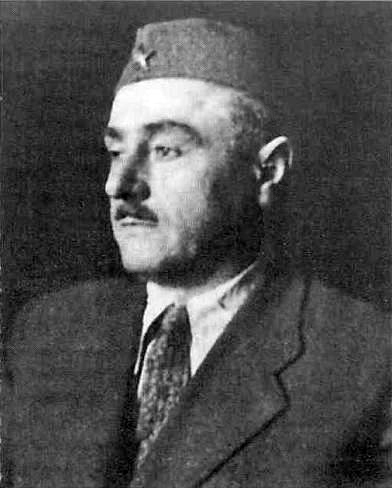
KPH secretary Andrija Hebrang quickly came into conflict with the HSS executive committee.

Some HSS members joined the Communist-dominated national liberation movement. This group was initially centered around Božidar Magovac, a close associate of Maček enjoying high esteem in the HSS. Magovac was disappointed by the HSS faction that supported the NDH, as well as party's' lack of even nonviolent resistance in light of atrocities committed by the NDH. Magovac discussed resisting or even organising an uprising with HSS leaders from Maček's faction, but received no support. Instead, he initiated contact with the KPH in the Podravina region (where he had moved after the outbreak of the war), seeking to arrange separate Partisan units for HSS members. After the request was declined, he called upon HSS members to join the Partisan movement in as great numbers as possible to "deprive it of the communist tone". Magovac moved to Partisan-held territory at the end of May 1943.

While some of the Partisan fighters resented the entry of HSS members into their ranks, the official position of the KPH under the leadership of its secretary Andrija Hebrang was that the newcomers were welcome and free to keep their political views unchanged. Hebrang correctly believed that greater involvement of the HSS members would lead to a broader participation of Croats in the Partisan struggle. Magovac's faction elected the HSS executive committee among themselves on 12 October 1943—the first day of the second session of the KPH-dominated State Anti-Fascist Council for the National Liberation of Croatia (ZAVNOH), and reformed this organisation at their 29–30 June 1945 meeting in Zagreb, under the name Croatian Republican Peasant Party (HRSS).

The KPH launched a propaganda campaign against Maček and his "clique", who were branded as collaborators helping the Ustaše, Royalist Chetniks and the Yugoslav government-in-exile. By September 1943, the KPH determined that the propaganda against Maček backfired and reinforced his standing. In response, in early 1944, the ZAVNOH propaganda section continued to target Maček's associates while avoiding mentioning Maček himself.

== Scheme to seize power ==
=== Strategic considerations ===
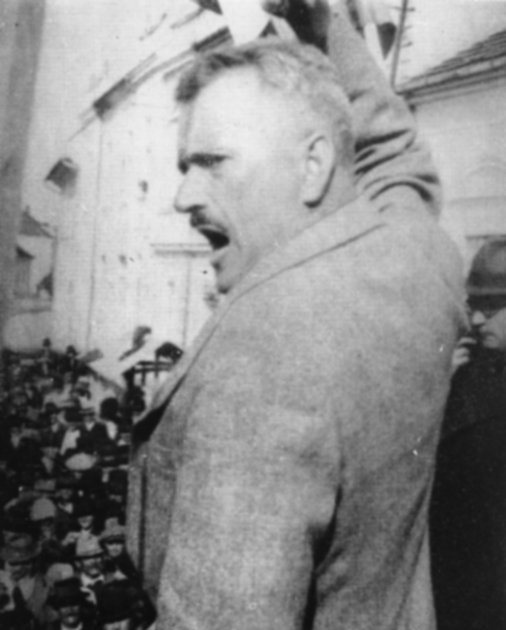
Josip Torbar talked to laeaders of the Independent State of Croatia on behalf of the HSS in 1941–1942

The HSS leadership loyal to Maček became increasingly active in late 1942 and early 1943 in response to Partisan military successes and political developments, especially the assembly of the Anti-Fascist Council for the National Liberation of Yugoslavia (Antifašističko vijeće narodnog oslobođenja Jugoslavije, AVNOJ) and the ZAVNOH. Many HSS members became frustrated by Maček's policy of waiting and were increasingly joining the Partisans, especially in Dalmatia and the Croatian Littoral, but also in Lika and Slavonia where the HSS members feared that the war would end without an adequate armed force supporting Croatian national interests—similar to the situation in 1918 when the lack of any military at the end of the World War I proved detrimental to Croatian interests.

Believing that the Western Allies would oppose communist rule in Yugoslavia, the HSS concluded that an Allied landing was to be expected somewhere along the Adriatic coast, likely in Dalmatia. Similar assumptions were made by the Chetniks, who planned to join the invading Allies against the Germans and the NDH. In 1941 and 1942, Josip Torbar held several meetings on behalf of the HSS with Pavelić where they discussed potential handover of power to the HSS if the Western Allies made significant progress as well as on reversal of banning of the HSS. While Pavelić made some promises in those respect, the meetings produced no concrete results. Tito asked the USSR if it would approve of Partisans fighting against likely Allied landing in October 1943, while the Germans removed tens of thousands of combat-age male Croats from Dalmatian coast and Adriatic islands in early 1944 because they thought the Croatian population would assist Allied landings.

Despite the NDH's ban of the HSS, the Ustaše regime still thought the party had significant popular support. Because of this, and since limitations imposed by the 1941 Treaties of Rome, requiring the NDH to comply with Italian interests in military, economic and political matters, expired with the surrender of Italy, prime minister Nikola Mandić invited the HSS to negotiations on the inclusion of the HSS in his government. In late September 1943, Košutić declined the offer as "impossible in principle" and useless. The HSS was only willing to join a democratically elected government, while Pavelić refused to relinquish his dictatorial powers.

=== Reaching out to the Allies ===
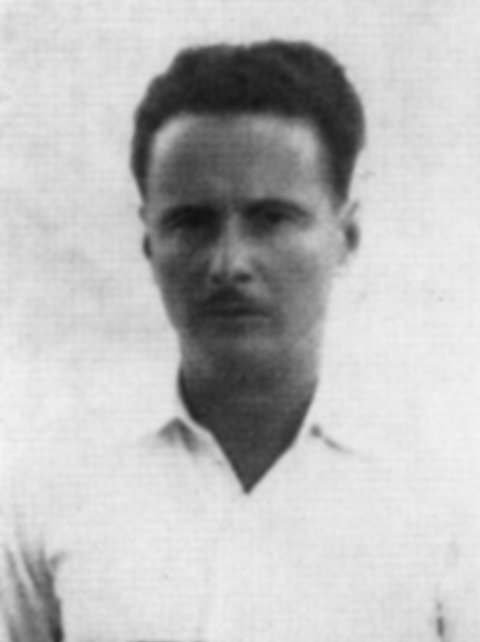
Tomo Jančiković tried to contact the Western Allies in Italy in 1943

To obtain an armed force and exploit the expected Allied landings, in the second half of 1942, the HSS attempted to gain control over the Croatian Home Guard. The campaign was led by Košutić with the help of Ljudevit Tomašić, a party official who had maintained contacts with British officials posted in Yugoslavia before the war, and the acting party secretary Ivanko Farolfi who had been tasked with maintenance of contacts with the Home Guard. The HSS called on Croats to join the Home Guard, and the move angered the KPH. The HSS expected to achieve a better position allowing it to negotiate with Serb political leaders on equal footing after the war.

HSS representatives established contacts with the Allies in Italy but found it difficult to negotiate with them. These negotiations stood virtually no chance of success because of the defection of HSS paramilitaries to the Ustaše, the abandonment of the entire police apparatus of Banovina of Croatia without resistance, Maček's call to submission in 1941 and especially the wait-and-see policy. The HSS sent three envoys, all of whom reached the Allies, but were then kept in isolation or ignored. The first was Maček's close associate Tomo Jančiković who arrived by boat in Bari in September 1943. Following accusations by the Yugoslav Partisans forwarded through the British mission in Yugoslavia, the British kept him isolated in a prison camp in Bari, unsure how to treat him. HSS officials in London tried to intervene, but Šubašić only managed to meet him in June 1944. Shortly afterwards, Jančiković was allowed to travel to London, but his mission was pursued no further because the political circumstances had changed in the meantime. Former Royal Yugoslav Navy officer Zenon Adamič contacted allies by travelling to Istanbul in November 1943. He was moved by the British to Egypt and interrogated, but his information had no effect on the Allied perception of the HSS and its position in Yugoslavia. Adamich remained in Egypt until the end of the war and assumed command of the Yugoslav Royal Naval base in Alexandria. In January 1944, lieutenant colonel Ivan Babić flew to Bari in an airplane belonging to the NDH armed forces minister Miroslav Navratil. Babić was also interrogated by the British and confined in a prison camp until after the war. By late March or early April, Tomašić and Farolfi learned from British military intelligence personnel in Switzerland that the United Kingdom preferred that the HSS cooperate with Tito. After Foreign Secretary Anthony Eden confirmed this on 6 April 1944, Košutić contacted the KPH with his terms of cooperation.

=== Vis Agreement ===
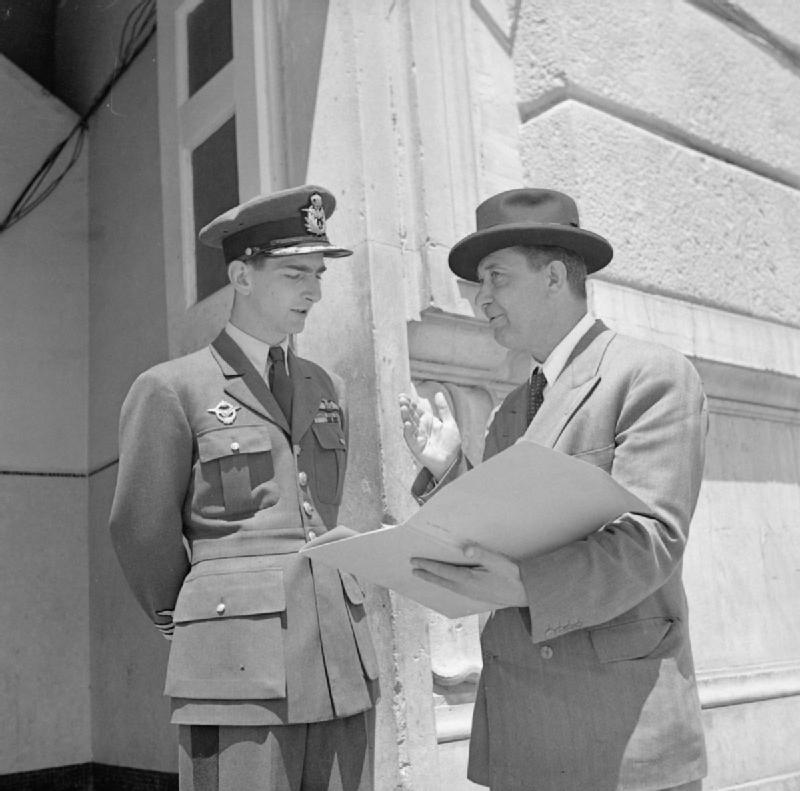
Ivan Šubašić talking to King Peter II days after signing the Vis Agreement

Since the beginning of the war, the Yugoslav government-in-exile was split along an ethnic line between the HSS and Serb ministers from several disunited parties. The divisions deepened in late 1941 as the HSS ministers proved reluctant to publicly discuss and condemn Ustaše atrocities against Serbs. In January 1942, Prime Minister Slobodan Jovanović decided to support the Chetniks, widening the rift with the HSS ministers. Jovanović chose to overlook Chetnik collaboration with the Axis powers due to their pro-monarchy and anti-Communist orientation. Chetnik leader Draža Mihailović was appointed the Minister of the Army, Navy and Air Forces on 11 January 1942. In January 1943, Mihailović approached Krnjević regarding possible collaboration, but those talks only produced a BBC radio broadcast from Krnjević, in which his call to Croats to join Chetniks was mostly ignored. On 22 July, Krnjević made another appeal, asking the party members to take up arms without specifying who to join, considerably increasing the number of HSS members joining the Partisans. In late 1943, the British Foreign Office wanted to bring Maček to London to bolster the Yugoslav government-in-exile. The Partisans, whose assistance was necessary to carry out the operation, declined to help.

Prime Minister of the United Kingdom Winston Churchill pressured King Peter II to appoint Šubašić prime minister of the government-in-exile. Šubašić became prime minister on 1 June and met Tito two weeks later on Vis. Churchill wrote to Tito to emphasize the importance the British government placed on an accord between him and Šubašić. Tito and Šubašić produced the Vis Agreement for a coalition government, but the agreement specified that the system of government in Yugoslavia would be decided after the war. Furthermore, Šubašić accepted the decisions made by the AVNOJ, and recognised the legitimacy of bodies established by the AVNOJ. A follow-up agreement was signed in Belgrade on 1 November 1944. Under its provisions, Tito became the prime minister and Šubašić his deputy and foreign minister in the provisional government.

=== Lorković–Vokić plot ===
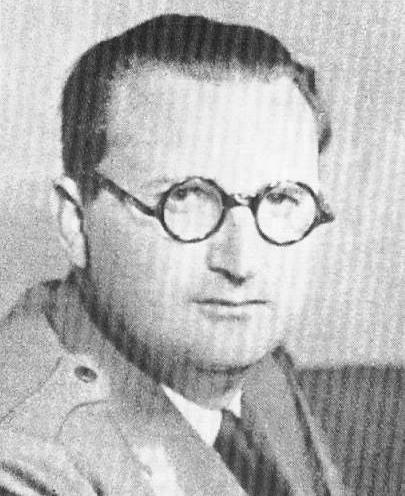
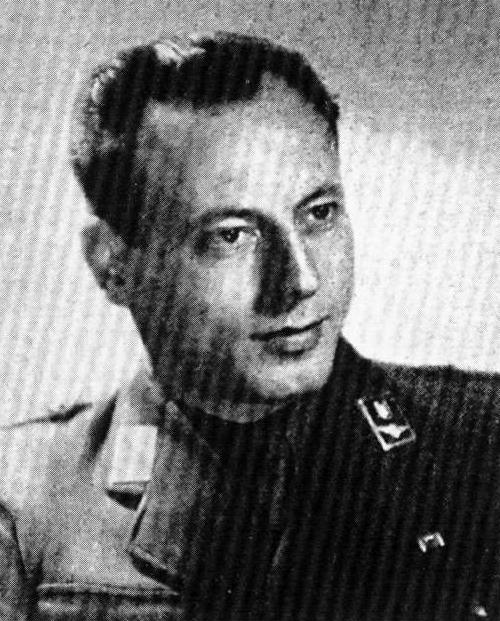
Interior Minister Mladen Lorković (left) and the Minister of Armed Forces Ante Vokić (right) assumed the leadership of the attempt to overthrow Ustaše in 1944.

The Interior and Armed Forces ministers in the NDH government Mladen Lorković and General Ante Vokić—the first high-ranking Home Guard officers to come into contact with Farolfi—joined the HSS-devised plot to switch allegiance to the Allies in early 1944. Lorković and Vokić assumed leading roles in execution of the plan to switch allegiance of the NDH to the Allies. They tried to recruit Pavelić, but believing Germany would win the war, he had the ministers arrested.

After the arrests, Košutić fled Zagreb and headed to Partisan-held Topusko, where he met Hebrang and British liaison officer Major Randolph Churchill to pursue negotiations on HSS–KPH cooperation proposed in April. Even though HSS's position had deteriorated in the interim and Partisans had achieved a diplomatic success in the Vis Agreement, Košutić increased his demands. He submitted a list of demands asking for free elections, assurances regarding preservation of private property, and separate Croatian diplomatic representatives and armed forces within Yugoslav federal diplomatic service and armed forces after the war. In response, KPH broke off the negotiations and launched a propaganda campaign to politically break up the Maček's faction of the HSS and destroy the HSS as a political force in the post-war context and as a symbol which could be used by political opponents of the KPJ and the KPH. Košutić was arrested by the Partisans on 1 October and detained without indictment until September 1946. Tomašić and Farolfi were arrested by the Ustaše, while the remaining HSS leaders in the country almost ceased activity. Tomašić, Farolfi and several other conspirators were killed on Pavelić's orders in the Lepoglava prison in late April 1945.

== Aftermath ==
=== End of the coalition government ===
In consultation with party loyalists and at the suggestion of the NDH leadership, Maček decided to leave Yugoslavia before the Partisans entered Zagreb and continue politics from exile. The NDH leadership believed Maček would be the only viable alternative to communist rule over Croatia. Maček authorised Krnjević's secretary Stjepan Pezelj to lead the HSS in the country until Košutić's release and left with NDH assistance on 6 May 1945.

In mid-August, after establishment of the People's Front of Yugoslavia (Narodni front Jugoslavije, NFJ), Šubašić asked the KPJ permission to re-establish the pre-war organisation of the HSS. The KPJ insisted that he come to an agreement with the HRSS. The HRSS leadership met with Šubašić on 25 August, but no agreement was reached. The HRSS declined to admit Šubašić to the party, while Šubašić said that two Croatian Peasant Parties should not be allowed to coexist.

The 28-strong provisional government of Yugoslavia established in March 1945 included 11 non-Communist government ministers, but only six of them were previously members of the government-in-exile. Out of those six, only three were not supporters of, or not otherwise affiliated with, the Partisans—Šubašić, Juraj Šutej of the HSS, and Milan Grol of the Democratic Party. Grol resigned his position in August due to KPJ's non-compliance with the democratic conditions agreed as necessary to establish the provisional government.

Šubašić convened a HSS conference at the Esplanade Zagreb Hotel on 2 September. A majority of those present there decided not to form a coalition with the HRSS and to stay out of the NFJ. Instead, they voted to join the united opposition to the KPJ, supported Šubašić's and Šutej's resignations from the government, and asked Šubašić to visit Maček in Paris in nine days. On 10 September, Edvard Kardelj (one of Tito's close associates) informed Šubašić that he would not be allowed to travel, and Šubašić suffered a stroke that night. Resignations tended by Šubašić and Šutej came into effect on 8 October.

=== First post-war elections ===
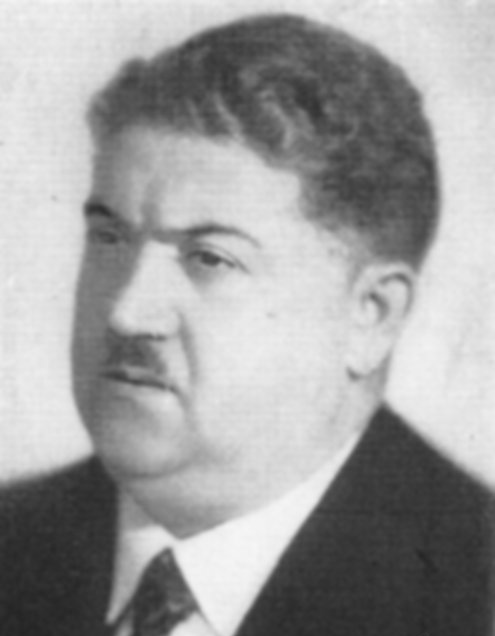
Juraj Šutej proposed reactivating the HSS in Yugoslavia in 1946

On 20 October, the HSS members closest to Košutić published the newspaper Narodni glas čovječnosti, pravice i slobode (National Herald of Humanism, Justice and Freedom). The single issue of the publication, largely prepared by Košutić's wife Mira and her mother Marija Radić—the widow of HSS founder Stjepan Radić—argued that the HSS should refuse formal registration as a political party and boycott the upcoming parliamentary election claiming that free will of the people could not be expressed due to regime-imposed restrictions on freedoms. The issue was banned on the grounds that it insulted the achievements of the national liberation struggle. Workers of the print shop which printed the first issue refused to do any further work for the newspaper. The elections, held on 11 November, were boycotted by the entire opposition including the HSS. To counter the boycott, the regime introduced a ballot box without a list to formally offer the opportunity of voting against the NFJ. Two days after the elections, a bomb or some type of explosive device exploded in front of Marija Radić's bookshop, preventing the publication of additional issues. An investigation was launched but it did not identify the perpetrator.

In 1946, prior to the scheduled Croatian Sabor election, Šutej wanted to re-activate the HSS by registering the party and participating in the election while remaining outside the NFJ. After his release, Košutić vetoed the plan, on 6 September, believing that it would only invite repression by the regime, and that the HSS should wait. With his support, Šutej and Magovac tried to run as independents, hoping to strengthen the HSS' position with strong election results while avoiding further repression. The independent candidacies were rejected by the Prime Minister of the People's Republic of Croatia Vladimir Bakarić and the KPJ conducted a series of show trials, completely dismantling the party in 1947–1948. After that, the HSS could only operate in exile.
