= Ivanko Farolfi =

Lawyer and Yugoslav politician

- Born: 14 July 1892; Vis
- Died: 30 April 1945 (aged 52); Lepoglava Prison, Lepoglava, Independent State of Croatia
- Cause of death: Execution by firing squad
- Occupation: Politician
- Known for: role in Lorković–Vokić plot
- Political party: Croatian Peasant Party

Ivanko Farolfi (14 July 1892 – 30 April 1945) was a lawyer and Croatian and Yugoslav politician. He was a member of the Croatian Peasant Party (Hrvatska seljačka stranka, HSS). He was the mayor of Vis from 1936 to 1941. After the World War II invasion of Yugoslavia, Farolfi moved to Zagreb. Yugoslavia was dismembered and the Independent State of Croatia (Nezavisna Država Hrvatska, NDH), an Axis puppet state, was established. The HSS split into several factions, but Farolfi stayed in a faction that remained loyal to the party's prewar president Vladko Maček. Soon after beginning of the war, Maček was arrested and spent most of the period under house arrest, advocating passivity and keeping his distance from the Ustaše that ruled the NDH on the one hand and from the Communist Party of Yugoslavia (Komunistička partija Jugoslavije, KPJ). The KPJ and its nominally independent branch, the Communist Party of Croatia (Komunistička partija Hrvatske, KPH) which led increasingly successful armed resistance: the Yugoslav Partisans. After a period of inactivity, the HSS leadership consisting of party secretary August Košutić, Ljudevit Tomašić, and Farolfi tried to implement a strategy to gain control of the NDH's regular army: the Croatian Home Guard. The scheme was based on Maček's erroneous belief that the Western Allies would not tolerate a communist regime in Yugoslavia and that the Allies would land someplace along the Dalmatian coast to prevent the increasingly successful Partisans from prevailing in the country. The HSS planned to have the Home Guard switch allegiance then to the HSS and the Allies so the HSS could negotiate from the position of force after the war. Farolfi was tasked with securing cooperation of high-ranking Home Guard officers. The plan produced no significant results because the HSS envoys sent to contact the Allies were ignored. Although no significant officers participated in the scheme for years, this changed in 1944, when the group was joined by the Interior and Armed Forces ministers in the NDH government Mladen Lorković and General Ante Vokić. The ministers assumed a further initiative in what became known as the Lorković–Vokić plot to switch the NDH's allegiance to the Allies. Lorković and Vokić believed the NDH leader Ante Pavelić would support the plan and informed him, only to be arrested along with Farolfi and Tomašić. All four were taken to Lepoglava Prison, where they were held until 30 April 1945 and executed shortly before the defeat of the NDH.

== See also ==
- Croatian Peasant Party during World War II
