= Vladimir Košak =

Croatian politician, diplomat (1908–1947)

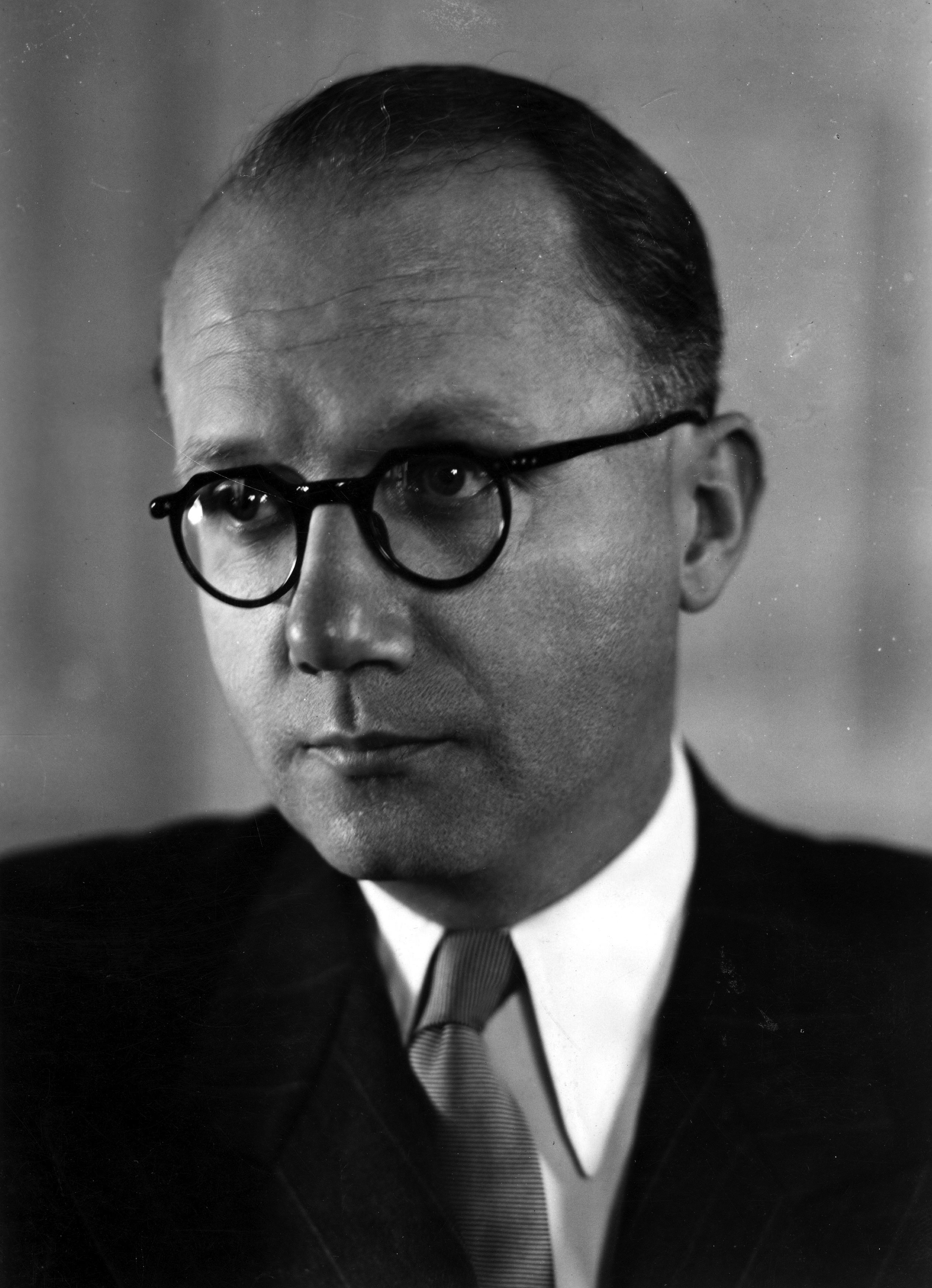

Croatian Ambassador to the Third Reich
- In office 30 March 1944 – 8 May 1945

Croatian Ambassador to the Kingdom of Hungary
- In office 1 April 1943 – 30 March 1944
- Succeeded by: Branko Benzon

1st Minister of State Treasury of the Independent State of Croatia
- In office 1 July 1941 – 1 April 1943
- Prime Minister: Ante Pavelić
- Preceded by: Office established
- Succeeded by: Antun Filipančić

Personal details
- Born: 25 July 1908 Velika Gorica, Croatia-Slavonia, Austria-Hungary
- Died: 18 June 1947 (aged 38) Zagreb, SR Croatia, SFR Yugoslavia
- Cause of death: Execution by hanging
- Party: Ustaše
- Education: University of Zagreb University of Frankfurt
- Occupation: Politician, diplomat
- Profession: Economist, lawyer

Vladimir Košak (25 July 1908 – 18 June 1947) was a Croatian economist, lawyer, politician and NDH diplomat, hanged for war crimes after World War II.

== Early life ==
Košak was born in Velika Gorica. He graduated with a doctorate in law Faculty of Law, University of Zagreb, after which he received another doctorate in economics from the University of Frankfurt in Germany. After completing his education, Košak returned to Zagreb, where he worked as a secretary of the Commerce-Industrial Chamber. Soon he became president of the Pension Fund of Private Officers, after which he became Chief Director of Pohit, the largest industrial holding in Croatia at the time.

== Ustaše ==
On 1 July 1936, Košak joined the fledgling Ustaše and participated in starting of newspaper Hrvatski narod (The Croatian People).

=== Minister ===
Košak was also a signatory of the proclamation of the Independent State of Croatia on 10 April 1941. Two days later, he was named the personal proxy of the Minister of Armed Forces, Vojskovođa Slavko Kvaternik. He was later named Commissioner for Economic and Financial Affairs.

In the Croatian State Government, Košak was a secretary in the Ministry of the People's Economy, and after government reorganization on 30 June 1941, he became the State Treasurer (Minister of Finance). He was president of the Croatian Economy Delegation during the negotiations with Italy in June 1941 and Co-chairman of the Croatian-Italian Economy Commission. After an incident involving the smuggling of gold, Ivo Kolak, cabinet chief of Mladen Lorković, was executed while Lorković was removed from office. Košak was forced to resign and on 1 April 1943 he was relieved of his ministerial duties.

=== Diplomat ===
From his resignation as minister until 30 March 1944, he continued to serve Croatia in a diplomatic forum as ambassador to Hungary in Budapest. After that he became ambassador to the Third Reich in Berlin. In July 1944 he was named State Minister, but he stayed on as an ambassador in Berlin. Košak was a close associate of Lorković and was one of his best men, alongside Ante Vokić, at Lorković's wedding to Nada von Ghyczy in August 1944. Ante Pavelić intended to relieve him of all duties because he harbored suspicions that Košak was involved in the Lorković-Vokić coup, a coup in which Lorković and Vokić, along with many other influential politicians and military officers, intended to change side and join the Allies; the coup ended in failure. Košak was protected by Siegfried Kasche, German ambassador to Croatia, and was able to retain his title as ambassador to Germany. Following Pavelić's advice, Košak remained in Berlin after Hitler's death, intending to stay with the short-lived Flensburg Government. He was arrested by the British in Flensburg in May 1945. In February 1946 he was extradited to Yugoslavia and sentenced to death on 6 June 1947 for treason and war crimes; he was executed 12 days later, on 18 June.
