= Ljudevit Tomašić =

Croatian politician (1901–1945)

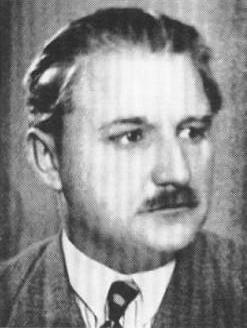
Ljudevit Tomašić

Ljudevit Tomašić (2 January 1901 – April 1945) was a Croatian politician and prominent member of the Croatian Peasant Party (HSS). He is known for his participation in the failed Lorković-Vokić plot in 1944 which aim was to create a coalition government between the Ustaše and the HSS and bring the Independent State of Croatia (NDH) on the side of Allies. Tomašić was arrested in August 1944, and killed in April 1945.

== Early life ==
Tomašić was born in Zagreb, where he graduated from the gymnasium in 1920, after which he entered the Faculty of Philosophy in Zagreb, where he studied philosophy and natural science. He graduated in 1929, gaining a diploma from philosophy and pedagogy. At the same time, Tomašić was studying at the Faculty of Law, University of Zagreb, but in the 1921 he graduated from teachers' school and worked in Sveti Martin na Muri as a teacher in an elementary school, but in 1923 he was fired due to his political activity.

== Activity in the HSS ==
From 1917, Tomašić was member of the HSS. In 1927, he was sentenced to three years in prison, and at the beginning of 1929, he war released due to general amnesty. Under the police pressure, he left Zagreb and lived for four years in Samobor under constant police surveillance; at the beginning of 1933, he was expelled from Samobor and extradited to the police in Zagreb, but was soon released. In 1935, Tomašić was elected to the parliament as a representative of Samobor and in 1938 as a representative of Klanjec. In 1940, he became Director of the Economy Unity.

=== World War II ===
During the existence of the Independent State of Croatia, from 1941 till 1945, Tomašić belonged to the middle fraction of the HSS, gathered around Vladko Maček; he was also a member of the immediate war leadership of the Party. In 1942, he was called to be member of the Croatian State Sabor, but he refused the offer. Tomašić illegally spread the HSS' newspapers. In 1943, Tomašić participated on the session of the immediate HSS leadership where they refused the suggestion of the Prime Minister of the Independent State of Croatia, Nikola Mandić, about the coalition government. While Maček was transferred to his apartment while he was under house arrest, Tomašević delivered him reports on Mladen Lorković's and Ante Vokić's initiative about the coup. He was also one of the immediate negotiators with the Yugoslav Partisans. Because of his involvement in the Lorković-Vokić coup, Tomašić was arrested on 31 August 1944 and imprisoned in Lepoglava. He was killed on 24 or 25 April 1945. During the time of communist Yugoslavia he was falsely put on the list of the Jasenovac concentration camp victims as a part of communist propaganda.
