= Sida Košutić =

Croatian writer, poet, journalist and newspaper editor

- Born: 20 March 1902; Radoboj, Kingdom of Croatia-Slavonia, Austria-Hungary
- Died: 13 May 1965 (aged 63); Zagreb, SR Croatia, SFR Yugoslavia
- Resting place: Mirogoj Cemetery
- Education: University of Zagreb
- Writing career
- Language: Croatian
- Years active: 1922-1965
- Period: realism, post-romanticism (lyricism) in poetry
- Genres: poetry, drama, novel
- Subjects: childhood, relationship human-nature-God

Sida Košutić (20 March 1902 – 13 May 1965) was a Croatian novelist, playwright, poet, essayist, literary critic, columnist, lector, and editor-in-chief of Croatian Women's Journal. She was one of the most important female figures of 20th century Croatian literature.

== Life ==
Košutić was the sister of Croatian politician August Košutić. She graduated pedagogy at the University of Zagreb. She was editor-in-chief of Croatian Women's Journal (1939–1944) and lector in the Croatian Publishing Institute, Vjesnik and Seljačka sloga. As one of the founders of the Croatian Writers' Association, Košutić's work was labeled as anti-governmental; after refusing to sign the capital punishment verdict at the show trial directed against Cardinal Stepinac in 1946, she was fired from the Croatian Publishing Institute.

== Work ==
Košutić was a lyricist, developing her fundamental idea of the aspiration of the human soul to God. Her poetry expressed Christian contemplative and metaphysical preoccupations, which is permeated with seeking a meaning in the mutual expression of love among men and God. Her best lyrical works come in form of the prose poem (the dialogical collection of poems K svitanju, 1927). Her patriotic poetry works are authentic and deprived of pathos.

She wrote for numerous periodicals, including literary revues (Književnik, Hrvatska prosvjeta, Dom i svijet), Catholic and Croatian emigrant periodicals.
