= August Košutić =

Croatian politician (1893–1964)

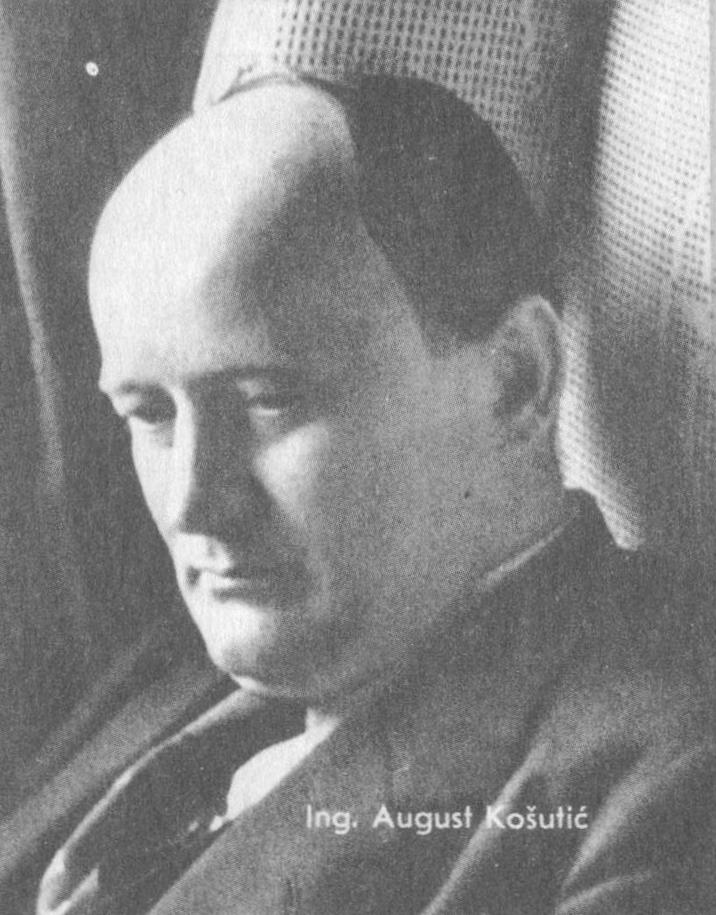

Minister of Construction
- In office 24 December 1926 – 1 February 1927
- Monarch: Alexander I of Yugoslavia
- Prime Minister: Nikola Uzunović

Personal details
- Born: 5 August 1893 Radoboj, Croatia-Slavonia, Austria-Hungary
- Died: 12 November 1964 (aged 71) Zagreb, Croatia, SFR Yugoslavia
- Party: Croatian Peasant Party
- Spouse: Mira Košutić (née Radić)
- Relations: Stjepan Radić (father-in-law)
- Education: Brno University of Technology
- Occupation: Politician
- Profession: Engineer

Military service
- Allegiance: Austria-Hungary
- Branch/service: Austro-Hungarian Army Austro-Hungarian Aviation Troops
- Years of service: 1914–1918
- Battles/wars: World War I: Battle of Galicia; Battles of the Isonzo

August Košutić (5 August 1893 – 12 November 1964) was a Croatian politician and a prominent member of the Croatian Peasant Party (HSS).

As a member of the HSS, Košutić traveled through Europe and United States to inform the world public about the Serb hegemonist policy of the Kingdom of Yugoslavia and the "Croatian issue". Because of his activity he was often arrested by the Yugoslav authorities, and in 1924 he was a victim of an assassination attempt. Between 1926 and 1927 he was briefly the Minister of Construction where he made great efforts in combating corruption.

During the World War II, in the Independent State of Croatia, he was most notable for his participation in the abortive Lorković-Vokić plot in 1944, a coup which had the goal of establishing a coalition government between the Ustaše and the HSS and align the Independent State of Croatia (NDH) with the Allies. After the war, he became politically inactive.

== Early life ==
Košutić was born in Radoboj, near Krapina, in the Croatian region of Zagorje. His sister Sida later became a prominent writer. His father Stjepan was HSS commissioner for Krapina region and he often met with Antun and Stjepan Radić, leaders of the HSS, so young August had a chance to listen to their conversations. After graduating from the elementary school, August entered the Zagreb gymnasium, where he was an excellent student. Because of that, he was entrusted with school library. Soon, August learned to write a stenography, so he was invited to work for the Sabor (Croatian parliament), where he started a close relationship with Stjepan Radić, who was also his godfather at his chrism, when Radić gave him all of his published works.

Young Košutić spent a lot of time in Radić's home to help him with writing and redaction of his articles, brochures and books. Košutić entered the Faculty of Law, University of Zagreb, but because of World War I, he stopped his study as he was invited to join the army. At the beginning of war he was an artillery officer, but later joined the air force school and he saw the end of the war as an air force officer. After the war, attended a technical school in Brno in Czechoslovakia, where he graduated and become an engineer, but where he also worked as an assistant. Soon, he returned to Croatia to work within the HSS, and in 1921 he married Radić's daughter Mira.

== Kingdom of Yugoslavia ==
=== Activity within the HSS ===
When the Kingdom of Serbs, Croats and Slovenes was created, its Prime Minister became Nikola Pašić, who enforced centralism and hegemonist rule, often accompanied by terror. Radić and Košutić travel aboard to inform the world public about the violent policy of Belgrade. Even though Košutić had immunity as member of parliament, authorities took his passport and forbade him to travel aboard, so he crossed the border illegally; in 1923 he was with Radić in London, later he went from Vienna to Zagreb where he was sent by Radić to inform the Croatian public about the image which was created about Croatia in the world. From Vienna, Košutić accompanied Radić on his way to Moscow to meet Georgy Chicherin, the Soviet foreign minister who wanted to meet Radić. Košutić continued to travel aboard, and as such, he bothered the Serbian authorities. In 1924, while he was holding a speech, in order to assassinate him, Jovo Gnjatović, a Serb, stuck him with a gunstock in his head. Košutić soon recovered, even though the doctors claimed he wouldn't; when he returned to Zagreb he was arrested.

=== Member of government ===
In 1926, Košutić was named undersecretary in the Ministry of Traffic and on 24 December 1926, Košutić was named Minister of Construction in the government of Nikola Uzunović, but after the stood down with the Radical Party, the HSS left the coalition on 1 February 1927. As a Minister of Construction, Košutić fought the corruption, which was highly present in this ministry, and illegal trading of properties. His ministry made a heavy blow to the corruption.

=== Activity before the implementation of a dictatorship ===
In 1927, after the HSS left the government, the new election was announced. For the HSS' political campaign, Košutić traveled to Macedonia, where the HSS had a lot of supporters, but he was arrested by police and transferred to Belgrade. Nevertheless, he continued to travel in Montenegro, Herzegovina, and South Croatia. In June 1928, Puniša Račić executed an assassination, killing few prominent members of the HSS and mortally wounding its leader, Stjepan Radić in the parliament. As a close associate of Radić, Košutić was one of his possible successors as president of the HSS after Radić died from wounds which he suffered during an assassination attempt in 1928.

=== Emigration ===
In August 1929, seven months after Alexander I of Yugoslavia imposed a royal dictatorship, Košutić emigrated, at first to Zürich, but after invite of the American branch of the HSS, he left for the United States in 1930. Immediately after he left the country, he was accused of stealing a few million Yugoslav dinars. This unabled his political activity in the United States, so he returned to Europe. In May 1930 Košutić and his party colleague Juraj Krnjević wrote a memorandum which they presented to the League of Nations outlining the disproportionate impact of king's decrees in Croatia. The memorandum also spoke of cultural domination, Croatia's lack of representation after suspension of political parties, of harsh treatment at the hands of "bureaucrats appointed by the absolutist king of Serbia," and the disproportionate application of the Law for Defence of the State in Croatia. Košutić and Krnjević also traveled in Geneva, London, Paris and to the United States as well. In 1931, American authorities concluded that the accusation was false and the charge was dismissed, so in Berlin, Košutić found out that he may return to the United States. He travelled across the United States to inform the Croatian emigration about the situation in Yugoslavia, counting on their help. After that, in March 1932, he went to Vienna, where he criticized Belgrade regime for corruption. From Vienna he continued to travel across the Europe to hold lectures and speeches. On 14 November 1932, on invitation of the British Royal Institute of International Affairs, Košutić held a speech about the "Croatian issue", and soon he left the significant impact in the diplomatic world when his speech was published by the Royal Institute.

=== Returnal to Yugoslavia ===
In 1934, King Alexander was killed by Ustaše in Marseille and was succeeded by Prince Paul, for whom Košutić claimed that he is a man of culture, and ulike Alexander, a friend of Croats. Košutić returned to Yugoslavia in 1937, when he was elected member of parliament. When the Banovina of Croatia was established on 24 August 1939, Maček sought the appointment of Košutić as Ban of Croatia, however, Prince Paul of Yugoslavia opposed Maček's proposal and chose Ivan Šubašić for the role. At the beginning of the 1930s, Košutić had been appointed Vice President of the HSS, while its president was Vladko Maček, who succeeded Radić. In the name of Maček, he led the negotiations with Dušan Simović, a Yugoslav general that led the military coup in 1941 which led to the abandonment of the Tripartite Pact. The negotiations were about the HSS' entry into Simović's government; recognition of the Tripartite Pact; appointment of two co-regents of which one would be Croat and removal of the Serb military from politics. Maček feard a coup by Croat separatists who sought to exploit the widespread Croat resentment against the Serbs for the coup and force a break with Belgrade. Soon afterwards, Yugoslavia was attacked by Germany and its allies and was quickly defeated.

== Independent State of Croatia ==
The Axis-allied state, the Independent State of Croatia (NDH), was established on 10 April 1941. Not long after the NDH was established, Košutić was detained in prison for three days and released without hearing. Again, he was arrested on 6 May and kept in prison until 20 August, when he was released but placed under house arrest. For the third time, he was arrested on 29 August 1942, and in September, along with another sixty members of the HSS who were pre-war members of parliament and leaders of the party, he was detained in Lepoglava prison on suspicion that he had collaborated with the Yugoslav Partisans. Together with all sixty members of the HSS, he was released on 23 December 1942. When Maček was arrested, Košutić remained in Zagreb with about six of the remaining HSS leadership, and became the de facto leader of the HSS.

In early 1943, while Maček was under house arrest, Košutić along with an interim HSS leadership team including senior members Ivanko Farolfi and Ljudevit Tomašić re-commenced political activity with the assumption that the Western Allies would soon land on the Dalmatian coast and would win the war. This activity included circulating leaflets promoting Maček as the only Croat acceptable to the Allies, and attempting to make contact with them. They also made contact with sympathetic officers of the Home Guard.

In order to expand the base for the Ustaše and to strengthen the Ustaše leadership, Ante Pavelić discussed forming a coalition government with Košutić and at the same time, weakening the Partisans. The negotiations took place between 1943 and 1944, but HSS leadership at the end, refused Pavelić's proposal to enter the government. Again in the middle of 1944, the negotiations were renewed on the initiative of the Minister of Interior, Mladen Lorković, ending with the Lorković-Vokić plot and imprisonment of the leaders of the coup when one fraction among the Ustaše and the nationalist wing of the HSS were defeated. At the same time, Košutić negotiated with the Communist Party of Croatia through Ivo Krbek, also a HSS member and former Deputy Ban of Croatia. Those negotiations were initiated by London, with goal to gain the support from the Croatian Home Guard in possible invasion of the Croatian Adriatic coast. On 1 September 1944, Pavelić invited him on conversation, but Košutić feared he would be manipulated by the Ustaše and joined the Partisans along with Radić's youngest son Branko.

== Communist Yugoslavia ==
Not long after he joined the Partisans, the communists arrested him and kept him imprisoned until 6 September 1946. After he was released, he became politically inactive and advocated that HSS should also freeze its activities in order to avoid arrests by the communists. He thought that the HSS needed to maintain its political strength and wait for the communist government to agree on concessions, which he believed would happen very soon due to an internal conflict within the Communist Party, which occurred after the Tito–Stalin split, and the crisis with the Western powers due to the border disputes over the Free Territory of Trieste. Many members of the HSS thought that Košutić made some sort of an agreement with the communists, so the leaders of the HSS, Juraj Šutej, Tomo Jančiković, Franjo Gaži, Božidar Magovac and Ivan Šubašić opposed his idea about the inaction. Košutić died in Zagreb.
