= Tomo Jančiković =

Croatian lawyer and politician (1899–1951)

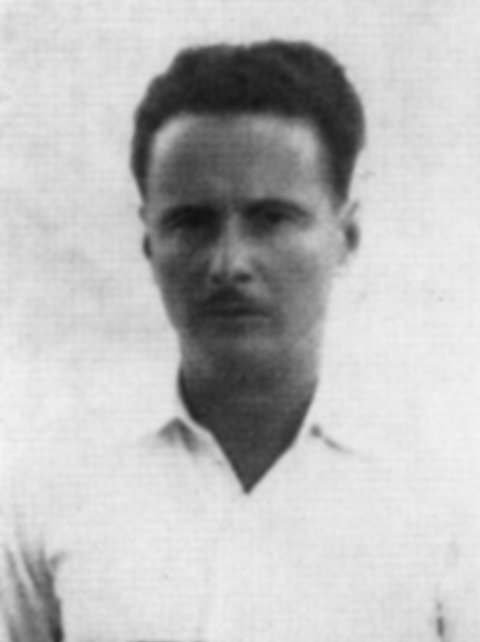
- Born: 2 November 1899; Vinkovci, Croatia-Slavonia, Austria-Hungary
- Died: 30 November 1951 (aged 52); Sremska Mitrovica Prison, Sremska Mitrovica, Yugoslavia
- Education: University of Zagreb
- Occupations: Politician, lawyer
- Political party: Croatian Peasant Party

Tomo Jančiković (2 November 1899 – 30 November 1951) was a lawyer and politician in Croatia and Yugoslavia. He was a member of the Croatian Peasant Party (Hrvatska seljačka stranka, HSS) and a prominent member of its leadership. Jančiković was a member of the Assembly of Yugoslavia elected on the HSS ticket.

Born in Vinkovci, Jančiković graduated law from the University of Zagreb in 1924 and opened his own law office in Zagreb three years later. Before switching his allegiance to the HSS, in 1920s, Jančiković was a member of the Action Committee of the Democratic Party for Croatia, Slavonia and Dalmatia. In that period, he wrote for party newspapers criticising actions taken by the HSS leader Stjepan Radić as anti-democratic. He also criticized the Law on the Protection of the State as unconstitutional. Following assassination of Radić in 1928, Jančiković joined the HSS. In 1929, Jančiković led an effort to reopen investigation of deaths of Communist Party of Yugoslavia members Đuro Đaković and Nikola Hećimović in which he disproved police accounts of their killing. Jančiković took part in drafting of the 1934 Zagreb Memorandum. He defended those accused of participation in the peasant rebellion in Kerestinec in 1936. On that occasion, he was noted for a speech in which he characterised the rebellion as a "mass delict" brought on by anti-Croatian coercive rule. He was elected to the national parliament on the HSS ticket in 1935 and 1938 elections as the representative of the district of Novi Marof. In 1920s and 1930s, Jančiković wrote professional papers on criminal law, law practice and the work of Ivo Pilar. (Jančiković married Pilar's daughter Vera.)

After the World War II invasion of Yugoslavia, Axis puppet Independent State of Croatia (Nezavisna Država Hrvatska, NDH) was established. The HSS split into several factions, but Jančiković stayed in a faction which remained loyal to the party's pre-war president Vladko Maček. Soon after the beginning of the war, Maček was arrested and spent most of the period under house arrest, advocating passivity and keeping distance to the Ustaše who ruled the NDH on one hand and to the Communist Party of Yugoslavia (Komunistička partija Jugoslavije, KPJ). The KPJ and its nominally independent branch, the Communist Party of Croatia (Komunistička partija Hrvatske, KPH) which led increasingly successful armed resistance – the Yugoslav Partisans.

Jančiković was briefly mobilised in the rank of the captain upon outbreak of the war. However, he returned to Zagreb only days later, on 10 April 1941. The NDH was established the same day, and its agents arrested Jančiković three days later. He was released in July 1941 and then he moved to the Adriatic Sea coast town of Crikvenica deeming it safer for him. There he declined an invitation by former HSS, then KPH member Šime Balen to join the Partisans. Jančiković turned down the invitation to attend the 1942 session of the Anti-Fascist Council for the National Liberation of Yugoslavia in Bihać. Instead he wrote to the HSS leaders urging them to revive intelligence gathering and propaganda work in view of battlefield successes of the Western Allies. Jančiković tried to establish cooperation with the KPH, but his request for authorisation of negotiations with the KPH leader Andrija Hebrang and Balen in June 1943 was declined by the HSS leaders in Zagreb.

In 1943, Jančiković travelled to Allied-controlled Bari, Italy to discuss the position of the Zagreb HSS with the party secretary Juraj Krnjević. Upon arrival, Jančiković was detained by the British since the Yugoslav Partisans accused him of collaboration with the Axis powers. He was not released before July 1944, when he made his way to London where the Yugoslav government-in-exile appointed him the vice-governor of the National Bank of Yugoslavia. He kept the position after the war, and the government of the Democratic Federal Yugoslavia invited Jančiković to be a member of the provisional parliament pending the 1945 election. Jančiković supported the idea of the HSS participating in the elections which were expected to be dominated by the KPJ due to unfair practices, but the party ultimately decided against it. The decision followed a meeting between Jančiković, Juraj Šutej and 25 other HSS members of the parliament. Soon after the meeting, the communist authorities arrested about one half of the participants in the conference. The move convinced the HSS leadership including Jančiković that the communist authorities were only interested in obtaining of legitimacy to the Croatian Republican Peasant Party (HRSS). The HRSS splintered from the HSS during the war and allied itself with the KPH, but failed to attract major prewar leading figures in the party.

Jančiković was arrested in May 1947 and convicted in February 1948 on trumped-up charges of wartime collaboration with the Axis powers. He was sentenced to 10 years of prison and hard labour. He died of unknown causes in Sremska Mitrovica Prison on 30 November 1951.

== See also ==
- Croatian Peasant Party during World War II
