= Lorković–Vokić plot =

Attempt by Croatian government to form a coalition with the HSS

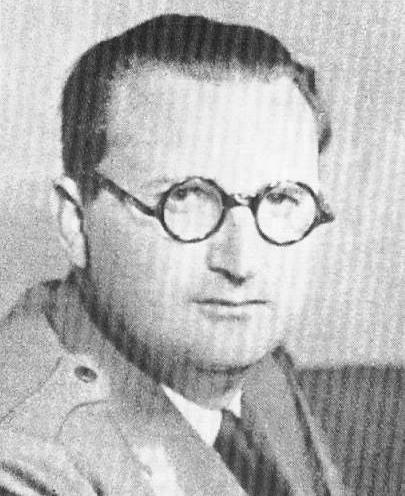
Mladen Lorković, Minister of Interior

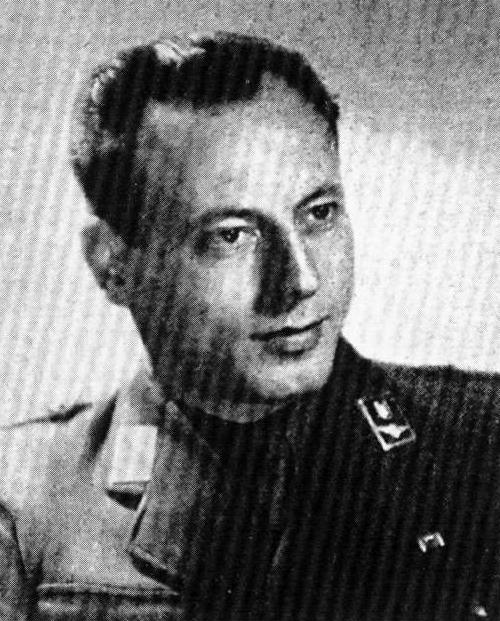
Ante Vokić, Minister of Armed Forces

Lorković–Vokić plot (Croatian: Urota Lorković-Vokić) was an attempted coup in the Independent State of Croatia, a puppet state during World War II in Yugoslavia, that happened in mid-1944. Initiated by Interior Minister Mladen Lorković and Armed Forces Minister Ante Vokić, the goal was to form a coalition government between the Ustaše and the Croatian Peasant Party (HSS), abandon the Axis powers and align the state with the Allies with the help of the Croatian Home Guard. The plot originated from the HSS, which was also involved in the negotiations with the Allies. The plot ended when Ante Pavelić uncovered it and declared it treasonous, followed by mass arrests and the execution of the major plotters, including Lorković and Vokić.

== Situation in Europe ==
On 24 August 1942, the Germans launched an attack on Stalingrad. The battle of Stalingrad ended in German defeat on 2 February 1943. After that victory, the war turned in the Soviet Union's favour. The Allied invasion of Sicily was launched on 9 July 1943, and soon, Benito Mussolini was overthrown and arrested on 25 July. The same day, Italian King Victor Emmanuel named Pietro Badoglio as Italy's new prime minister and, on 8 September 1943, signed the unconditional capitulation of Italy. On 6 June 1944, the Allies launched the D-Day landings on the German-occupied coast of Normandy. Following the successful invasion of Normandy and the Allies' advancement into German-held France, it became apparent to the plot's collaborators that Germany, and therefore the Independent State of Croatia, were fighting a losing war and that the eventual capitulation to the Allies was only a matter of time.

=== Coups in Axis nations ===
Because of defeats that Axis forces suffered from the Allies, some Axis nations tried to switch allegiances and aid the Allies. On 1 August 1944, the pro-Japanese leader Plaek Phibunsongkhram was ousted in Thailand. On 23 August 1944, as the Red Army approached Romania, King Michael staged a coup against the dictator Ion Antonescu and joined the Allies.

Soon after the coup in Romania, the Soviet Union declared war on Bulgaria on 5 September, crossed the Danube and occupied northeastern Bulgaria on 8 September. The Bulgarian Army was ordered not to offer any resistance. The Fatherland Front in Bulgaria overthrew the anti-Axis government of Konstantin Muraviev on 9 September 1944 (although Bulgaria officially declared neutrality on 2 September and left the Axis). Bulgaria joined the Allies on 9 September 1944 immediately after the coup.

On 15 October, the regent of Hungary, Miklós Horthy, announced that Hungary had left the war and attempted to have an armistice with the Soviet Union. In response, the Germans launched Operation Panzerfaust, arrested Horthy and installed Ferenc Szálasi, the leader of the fascist Arrow Cross Party, as leader of Hungary. The country would continue to fight the Red Army for the Axis until the end of the war.

== Preparations for the coup ==
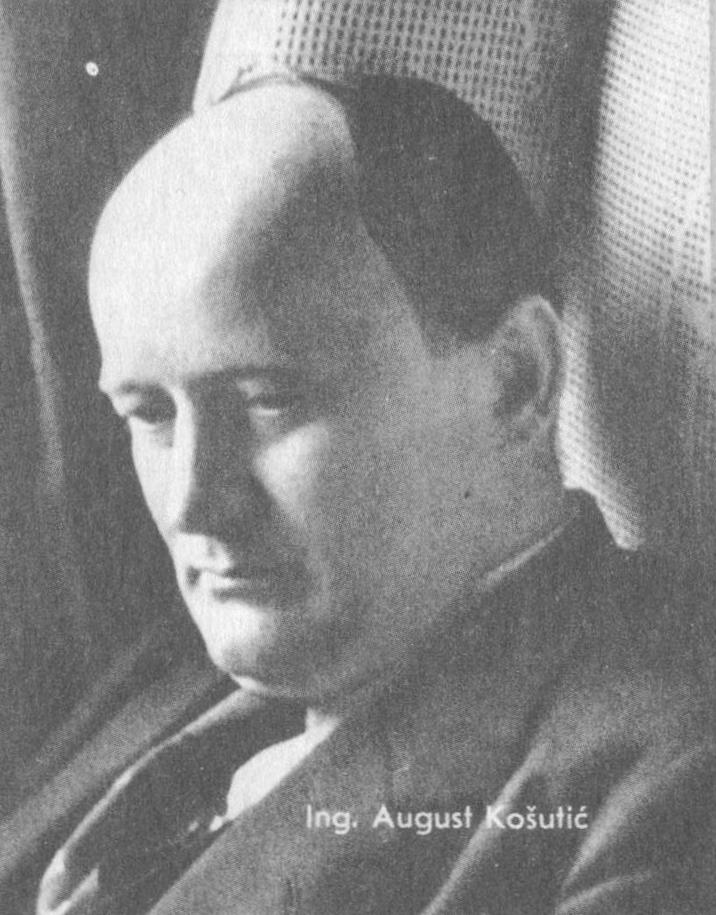
August Košutić, Vice President of the HSS

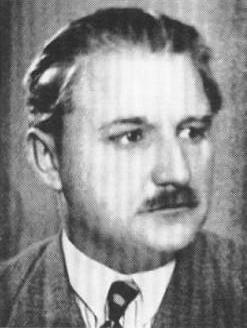
Ljudevit Tomašić, Deputy Secretary of the HSS

Vladko Maček, the president of the Croatian Peasant Party during World War II, thought that the British would support the democratic and anticommunist Croatian state. He therefore thought that the Allies would eventually land on the coast of Dalmatia and support his party as democratic and anticommunist. He also assumed that the Croatian Home Guard would support the HSS once the invasion of Dalmatia had started. Nevertheless, Draža Mihailović's Serb-dominated Chetniks had a plan directed against both Croats and communists if the projected Allied invasion of Dalmatia occurred. The three members of the HSS's leadership, Vice President August Košutić; Ljudevit Tomašić, a deputy secretary and representative who was already in contact with the Allies; and Ivanko Farolfi, were assigned the task of carrying out negotiations with the British. Farolfi was the most active and was in charge of maintaining contact with Croatian army officers, party leaders and foreign intelligence services.

Mladen Lorković had a plan to disarm the German Army on the territory of the Independent State of Croatia (NDH), install the Croatian Peasant Party (HSS) as the new government and call all Allied armies to land on the NDH territory. He also believed that the HSS would prevent the communists or King Peter II from coming to power. In July 1944, Vokić held a meeting at which he pointed out that once the Allies invaded the Balkans, the German armed forces would have to be disarmed.

The Germans were aware that Croatia could join the Allies. The Luftwaffe's attaché in Zagreb on 11 August reported that the Croatian military was becoming increasingly uncooperative towards the Germans. He also noted their request for more arms and ammunition from the German military. Lorković established contact with the Croatian Peasant Party representatives in Croatia, Ivanko Farolfi, Ljudevit Tomašić and August Košutić.

Their notion of an Allied invasion of Dalmatia failed to materialise, as Allies had no intention of landing in Dalmatia. Even so, Winston Churchill was sympathetic to the idea of an Allied invasion of the Croatian coast and so he initiated a discussion with Josip Broz Tito about a possible invasion of the Istrian Peninsula in August 1944. The representatives of the HSS and the Croatian Home Guard offered only promises. At the same time, the Yugoslav Partisans gained the status of an Allied force in at the Teheran Conference in late 1943, and the British did not want to risk co-operation with the Partisans. Their involvement in Yugoslavia was complicated by the fact that they dealt with both the Royal Yugoslav government-in-exile and the Partisans. An additional involvement of the Croatian Home Guard and the HSS was deemed to be unnecessary, and that it would strain the fragile allegiance established with the Partisans even further.

The Croatian negotiators with the Allies were Tomo Jančiković, Zenon Adamić and Ivan Babić. The British always had a separate meeting with them. The HSS thought that their emissaries had been successful in securing the Dalmatian invasion plan. The appointment of Ivan Šubašić as the Prime Minister of Yugoslavia in exile, as well as General Ivan Tomašević's offer to put his army under Allied command once the invasion began, further encouraged the plotters. Finally, the Romanian coup and the advance of the Soviet troops led them to believe that the Allies would soon invade Dalmatia.

== End of the plot and arrests ==
Ante Pavelić, the poglavnik of the Independent State of Croatia, thought the Germans would win the war with the "wonder-weapons". He called a meeting of his cabinet to his villa, which was guarded by armed men. A meeting took place on 30 August 1944, and Pavelić accused both Lorković and Vokić of involvement in the plot and treason. Vice President of the Government Džafer Kulenović and many others defended them but to no avail. Lorković and Vokić were arrested, along with 60 others. Lorković requested Pavelić not to harm the members of the HSS "as promised", and Vokić defended them in front of Pavelić by asserting that they had done everything that he ordered them to do. Some of those who were arrested were soon released, but Lorković, Vokić, Farolfi, and Tomašić were imprisoned and later executed.

== Conspirators ==
- Mladen Lorković - Minister of Internal Affairs, executed
- Ante Vokić - Minister of Armed Forces, executed
- Franjo Šimić - Croatian Home Guard general who was supposed to greet the English and American forces after their arrival on the Dalmatian coast
- Ivan Babić - Croatian Home Guard lieutenant-colonel who relayed information about the coup to the Allies in Italy; he later defected from the Home Guard and moved to South America
- Petar Blašković - Croatian Home Guard infantry general
- Ivan Mrak - Former commander of the Croatian Air Force Legion
- Ivanko Farolfi - member of Croatian Peasant Party, executed
- Ljudevit Tomašić - member of Croatian Peasant Party, executed
- August Košutić - member of Croatian Peasant Party
