= Mladen Lorković =

Croatian politician and collaborator with Nazi Germany

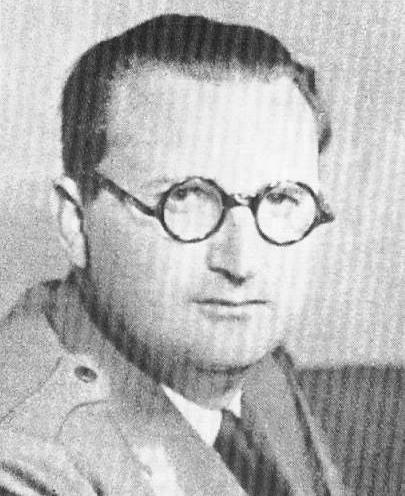

2nd Minister of Interior of the Independent State of Croatia
- In office 11 October 1943 – 30 August 1944
- Prime Minister: Nikola Mandić
- Leader: Ante Pavelić
- Preceded by: Andrija Artuković
- Succeeded by: Mate Frković

2nd Foreign Minister of the Independent State of Croatia
- In office 28 April 1944 – 5 May 1944
- Prime Minister: Nikola Mandić
- Leader: Ante Pavelić
- Preceded by: Stijepo Perić
- Succeeded by: Mehmed Alajbegović
- In office 9 June 1941 – 23 April 1943
- Leader: Ante Pavelić
- Preceded by: Ante Pavelić
- Succeeded by: Mile Budak

Minister for Relations with German Army
- In office 23 April 1943 – 11 October 1943
- Leader: Ante Pavelić
- Preceded by: Office established
- Succeeded by: Office abolished

Personal details
- Born: 1 March 1909 Zagreb, Croatia-Slavonia, Austria-Hungary
- Died: April 1945 (aged 36) Lepoglava Prison, Lepoglava, Independent State of Croatia
- Cause of death: Execution by firing squad
- Party: Ustaše
- Other political affiliations: Croatian Party of Rights (until 1929)
- Spouse: Wally Marquead (1937–1944; divorced) Countess Nada von Ghyczy (1944–1945; his death)
- Relations: Ivan Lorković (father) Blaž Lorković (grandfather) Zdravko Lorković (brother) Blaž Lorković (brother) Šimun Debelić (brother-in-law)
- Education: University of Berlin
- Profession: Lawyer
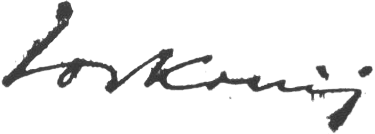
- Signature

Mladen Lorković (Croatian pronunciation: [mlâden lǒːrkoʋit͡ɕ]; 1 March 1909 – April 1945) was a Croatian politician and lawyer who became a senior member of the Ustaše and served as the Foreign Minister and Minister of Interior of the Independent State of Croatia (NDH) during World War II. Lorković led the Lorković-Vokić plot, an attempt to establish a coalition government between the Ustaše and the Croatian Peasant Party and align the Independent State of Croatia with the Allies.

As a student, he joined the Croatian Party of Rights but, viewed as a dissident in the Kingdom of Yugoslavia, he fled the country to avoid arrest and eventually settled in Germany where he obtained a doctorate in law at the University of Berlin. In 1934, he joined the Ustaše and became a close associate of Ante Pavelić. Although he was initially commander of all Ustaše in Germany, where he sought support in creating and protecting a Croatian state, he later became leader of all Ustaše outside Italy. Soon after the establishment of the NDH, he was appointed as Foreign Minister and strongly opposed Italian influence on the state. After his cabinet chief, Ivo Kolak, was executed in 1943 for smuggling gold, Lorković was removed from office but later named Minister of Interior. As Minister of Interior, he negotiated with the Croatian Peasant Party (HSS) in the hopes of establishing a coalition government. He also held secret negotiations with HSS representatives to propose having the NDH join the Allies against Germany. Although he apparently had the support of Pavelić, he and his cohorts were soon arrested as conspirators against the state and after a period in detention was executed at the end of April 1945 alongside Ante Vokić.

== Early life ==
Lorković was born in Zagreb on 1 March 1909, the son of prominent politician Ivan Lorković. He attended gymnasium in Zagreb where he became a supporter of the Croatian Party of Rights and later joined the Croatian Youth Movement. He began law studies at the University of Zagreb, but completed them in Innsbruck, Austria, following his escape. He later earned a Ph.D on the subject of the "Establishment of the State of Slovenes, Croats and Serbs" under Max Hildebert Boehm at the University of Berlin. Lorković and Branimir Jelić spoke about the state of Croatian university students at the International Students Federation congress in Brussels in 1930 for which they were arrested and held at the Palace of Justice before being taken to the German border. During his time in Berlin he met and later married Wally Marquead. He later divorced Marquead, and on 19 August 1944 he remarried to the Countess Nada von Ghyczy.

== Activities with the Ustaše ==
On 6 January 1929, King Alexander dissolved the government and introduced a royal dictatorship over the newly created Kingdom of Yugoslavia. Because he was viewed as a dissident, Lorković was placed under constant police surveillance. On 15 November 1929, a warrant for his arrest was issued, but he succeeded in escaping to Austria and later to Germany.

Lorković was a keen advocate for the amalgamation of all Croatian parties into a 'super-party' to secede from the Kingdom of Yugoslavia and on 4 October 1934 swore his Ustaše oath. He became commander of all Ustaše units in Germany and later, after the assassination of King Alexander, commander of all Ustaše outside Italy. The assassination of King Alexander led to him being briefly detained in Germany, but was released in mid-1935 after a German court rejected a Yugoslav request for his extradition.

In 1937, Lorković was arrested following a hearing conducted by the Gestapo. He subsequently left Germany and moved to Hungary and in 1939 returned to Yugoslavia, where he became an associate editor of the Hrvatski narod (Croatian Folk) journal and the editor of the underground journal Hrvatska pošta (The Croatian Post). Matica hrvatska published his book, The Croatian People and Their Lands, in 1939 in which he stated that all Bosnian Muslims were Croats by nationality. After the Banovina of Croatia proclamation, he was arrested in 1940 and detained at Lepoglava prison and later in Krušćica, near Vitez. Lorković was a signatory to a declaration, made on 31 March 1941 and signed on 5 May 1941, in which the Ustaše requested the declaration of a Croatian state. The document also sought German support, protection and recognition among Axis nations.

== Independent State of Croatia ==
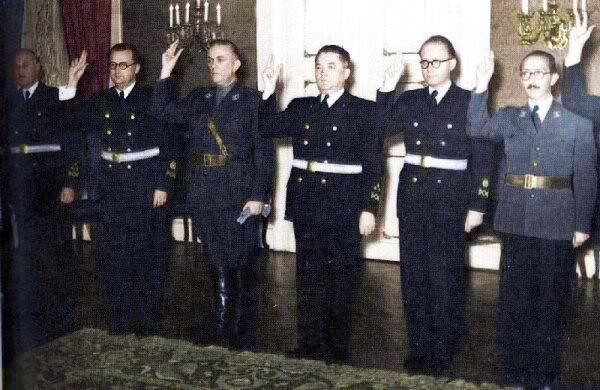
Mladen Lorković (2nd from left) taking oath in April 1941.

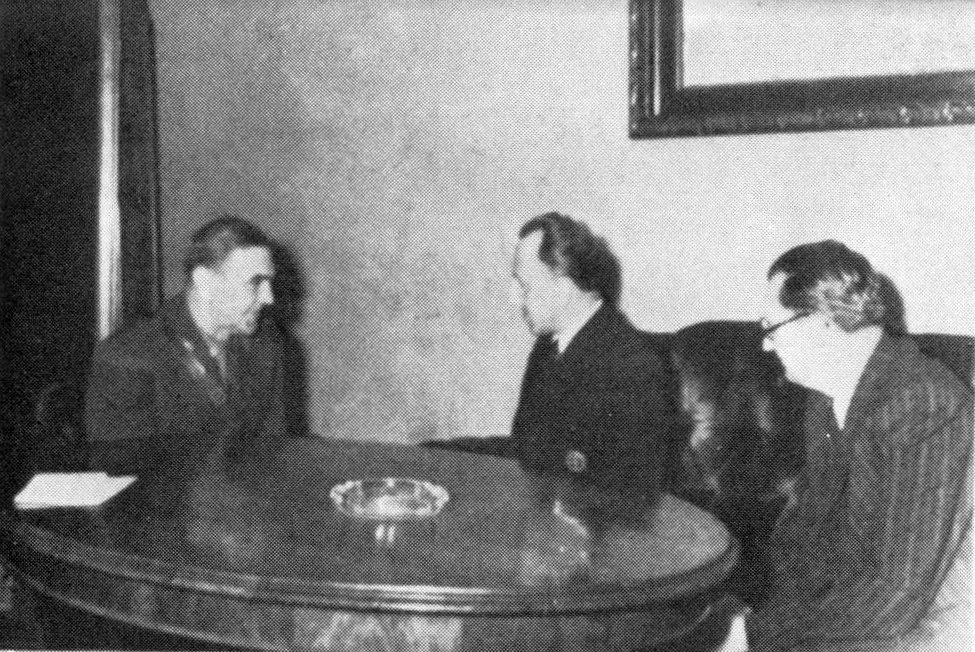
Pavelić, Slovak ambassador Karel Murgaš and Lorković (1st from right) in Zagreb in 1941.

Lorković was one of the most pro-German members of the pre-war Ustaše movement having cultivated political and academic ties in Germany during his time there. After the establishment of the NDH, Lorković became a member of the temporary government of Slavko Kvaternik known as the Croatian State Leadership. On 16 April 1941, Lorković was named Secretary of the Foreign Ministry in the first government formed by Ante Pavelić, who also served as Foreign Minister. Up to April 1943, he also served as the chief contact between Edmund Glaise von Horstenau, the Plenipotentiary General in the Independent State of Croatia, and the Pavelić cabinet.

Lorković succeeded Pavelić as Foreign Minister on 9 June 1941. Shortly after taking office, he inquired with the French authorities about the fate of three Ustaše implicated in the 1934 assassination of King Alexander in Marseille and sentenced to life imprisonment. The actual assassin was a Bulgarian mercenary, Vlado Chernozemski, who was killed after the deed by French security forces. Two of the men died in prison, but the third, Milan Rajić, was returned to the NDH in early 1942 through the intervention of the German occupation forces in France, where he was later killed allegedly on Pavelić's orders.

On 27 July 1941, in a speech designed to inflame Croats against the Serbs living in the NDH, Lorković lied that Serbs had beaten, mutilated and massacred tens of thousands of Croatian peasants during the inter-war period. In August, he strongly opposed an Italian request to implement civil administration in the demilitarized zone of the NDH. The Italians countered the following spring by accusing Lorković of being a communist to discredit him for his pro-German views. Lorković was cleared of all charges after a police investigation. However, a German police attaché in Zagreb did claim that Lorković had been in contact with some communists in the early 1930s and had helped some Croatian communists in 1941 and 1942. In May 1942, Lorković was appointed honorary member of the German Institute for Border and Foreign Studies. Lorković, along with Vladimir Košak and Stijepo Perić, strongly opposed Italian influence over the Independent State of Croatia and towards the end of 1942, wrote a note ("Spomenica") in which he described the cooperative efforts of Italy's 2nd Army with the Chetniks. This note was officially submitted on 26 January 1943 to the Italian Foreign Minister Galeazzo Ciano. In response, the Italian diplomat Raffaele Casertano tried to have Lorković removed from office.

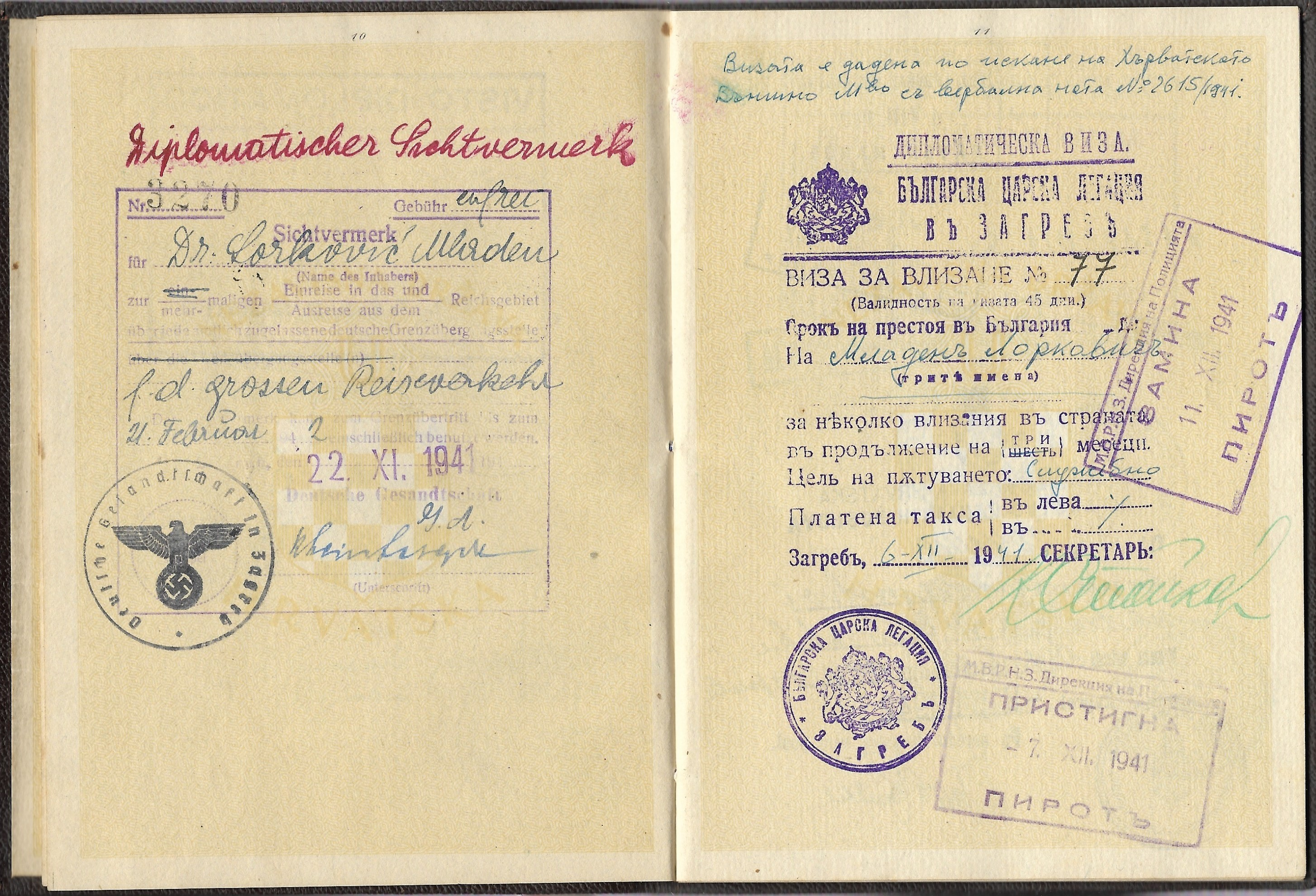
1941 German Diplomatic visa issued to Dr. Mladen Lorkovic to attend the Anti-Comintern conference in Berlin.

Heinrich Himmler, leader of the German Schutzstaffel (SS), wanted to form a Croatian Muslim SS division. He sent Phleps as his representative to Zagreb to begin formal negotiations with the Croatian government on 18 February 1943. He met with German foreign ministry envoy Siegfried Kasche and Mladen Lorković who represented Pavelić. Pavelić had already agreed to raise the division but the Waffen SS and Croatian government disagreed on how the division would be recruited and controlled. Lorković suggested that it be named "SS Ustaša Division", a Croatian unit raised with SS assistance, with familiar regimental titles such as Bosna, Krajina and Una. Pavelić and Kasche were concerned that an exclusively Muslim division might aid a Bosnian Muslim bid for independence. As a compromise, the word "Croatian" was included in its official title and some Croatian Catholic officers were recruited. Himmler and Phleps largely prevailed and created the division as they saw fit causing grave dissatisfaction among the NDH leadership, particularly regarding its ethnic composition.

On 23 April 1943 Lorković was removed from office after Lorković's cabinet chief, Ivo Kolak, was found guilty of gold smuggling and executed. Following his removal, Lorković was named a Minister in Government's Presidency, where he was responsible for relations with the German Army, and become a close associate of General Edmund Glaise von Horstenau. During the summer of 1943, he advocated cooperation with the Croatian Peasant Party (HSS) and represented the Ustaše in negotiations with the vice president of the HSS, August Košutić, about forming a coalition government. Lorković advocated a stronger government and greater independence in its activity. He initiated a new government to be led by himself as a prime minister and not the Poglavnik, but Pavelić named Nikola Mandić as prime minister on 2 September 1942. Lorković and some of his associates submitted their resignations, which were not accepted. Despite this setback, Lorković, along with Mandić, continued negotiations with HSS throughout September finalising them at the end of the month.

After the capitulation of Italy on 20 September 1943, Lorković, with Kasche and other high-ranking German officers, discussed the return of territory lost after the Treaty of Rome in April 1941. Ultimately, Hitler gave permission for the Independent State of Croatia to annex the territory by "guaranteeing unlimited independence of Croatia, including this Croatian Adriatic coast."

On 11 October 1943, Lorković was named Minister of Interior, where he advocated stricter policing, and a second term as Foreign Minister from 29 April until 5 May 1944, after his friend Perić was removed from office. It was agreed that Lorković would remain Foreign Minister and Minister of Interior simultaneously, but was soon replaced by Mehmed Alajbegović as Foreign Minister. After realising that Germany would lose the war and the NDH would cease to exist, he advocated radical changes in state policy. In February 1944, he wrote a detailed memorandum in German which summarized the history, current situation and the fundamental problems of the NDH and its Armed Forces, as well as problems with the German Army.

=== Lorković-Vokić plot and death ===
In May 1944, he secretly met with the president of Knin County, David Sinčić, with whom he discussed the poor state of the German war-effort and that the Allies may invade the Balkans via Taranto. That month, he launched an initiative to renew negotiations with the HSS, which he conducted in his apartment. There, he secretly met with Sinčić, August Košutić and Ivanko Farolfi. Lorković also sought foreign contacts and through Switzerland made contact with British and American officials, but was rebuffed. He proposed that the NDH end its relations with Germany and join the Allies, a proposal supported by the Minister of the Armed Forces, Ante Vokić, as well as many high-ranking Croatian Home Guard officers and politicians. Lorković also negotiated with the HSS about switching sides with Pavelić's knowledge and consent.

At a special session of government held on 30 August 1944 in Pavelić's villa, guarded by armed men, Lorković and Vokić were accused of conspiracy against the Poglavnik and Croatia's German ally. Vice President of the Government, Džafer Kulenović, and many others defended them but to no avail. Lorković was kept under house arrest until he was tried before the Poglavnik's Bodyguard Division (PTS) where it was decided that he would be stripped of his rank and expelled from the PTS. After the trial, he was transferred to Koprivnica and later in Lepoglava, alongside Vokić, Farolfi, Ljudevit Tomašić and others, although Košturić later escaped. Lorković was executed at the end of April 1945.

== Publishing activities ==
Lorković's publications during the time of the NDH were closely tied with his political activity and state obligations. He cooperated with a number of magazines, such as Croatia, which was published by HIBZ in German and French for the Foreign Ministry.

In 1939, Matica hrvatska published his book, The Croatian People and Their Lands (Narod i zemlja Hrvata), in which Lorković focused on the issue of Croatian boundaries. In 1942, he participated in the Croatian Parliament (Sabor). Two of his speeches were independently published: The International Political Position of Croatia (Međunarodni politički položaj Hrvatske; 1942) and The Croatian Struggle Against Bolshevism (Hrvatska u borbi protiv boljševizma; 1944). The latter was published in German in 1944.

== See also ==
- Media related to Mladen Lorković at Wikimedia Commons
