= Kupinec =

- Village
- Location within Croatia
- Coordinates: 45°40′N 15°47′E
- Country: Croatia
- County: Zagreb
- Municipality: Klinča Sela

Area
  - Total: 23.5 km^{2} (9.1 sq mi)
  - Land: 23.34 km^{2} (9.01 sq mi)

Population (2021)
  - Total: 796
  - Density: 34.1/km^{2} (88.3/sq mi)
- Time zone: UTC+1 (CET)
  - Summer (DST): UTC+2 (CEST)
- Postal code: 10450 Jastrebarsko
- Area code: +385(0)1

Kupinec is a village in Croatia near Zagreb. It was first mentioned in 1550. Its church, the Church of the Assumption of the Blessed Virgin Mary was built in the 17th century.

== People from Kupinec ==
- Vladko Maček, leader of the Croatian Peasant Party
