= Ivan Babić (officer) =

Croatian soldier (1904–1982)

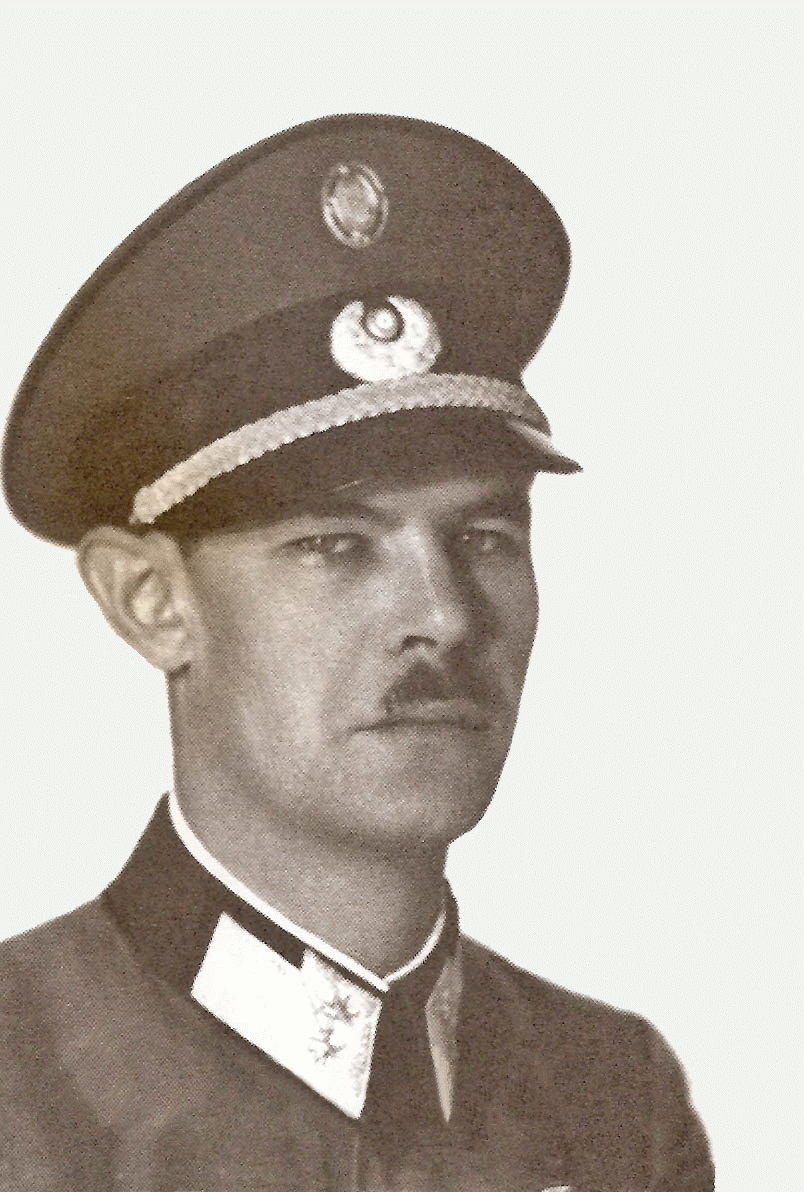
- Born: 15 December 1904; Sveti Ivan Žabno, Croatia-Slavonia, Austria-Hungary
- Died: 6 June 1982 (aged 77); Torremolinos, Spain
- Military career
- Allegiance: Kingdom of Yugoslavia; Independent State of Croatia; Nazi Germany
- Branch: Royal Yugoslav Army; Croatian Home Guard
- Service years: 1924–1945
- Rank: Major (Yugoslavia); Lieutenant colonel (NDH)
- Units: 38th Infantry Division Dravska (Yugoslavia); 369th Reinforced Infantry Regiment (Germany/NDH)
- Conflicts: World War II; Eastern Front
- Awards: Iron Cross 1st Class

Ivan Babić (15 December 1904 – 6 June 1982) was a Croatian soldier and lieutenant-colonel in the Croatian Home Guard and later an emigrant dissident writer against Communist Yugoslavia.

== Military career ==
He attended gymnasium in Bjelovar. Babić became a military cadet in the Yugoslav Royal Army in 1928 and was sent to Paris to perform further training at the École Superieure de Guerre.

After completing his examinations for Officers of the General Staff of the Yugoslav Army in 1935, he was assigned to the Operative and Organizing Department of the General Staff in Belgrade. From 1938 to 1941, he served as Divisional Chief-of-Staff, initially on the Albanian frontier, and later on the Italian and German frontier.

=== World War II ===
During the German-led attack on the Kingdom of Yugoslavia, Babić served as a major in the 38th Drava Infantry Division. In 1942, he commanded the 369th Reinforced Infantry Regiment, commonly known as the Croatian Legion, which fought on the Eastern Front. Afterwards, he headed the Home Guard Central School. Later that year, Babić became a conspirator in the Lorković–Vokić plot and flew a mission to American troops in Italy to suggest that the Allies invade the Dalmatian coast of the Independent State of Croatia to prevent the country from falling into communist hands. He claimed the invasion would meet no resistance and that the Croatian army would establish a beachhead for them.

== Post-war ==
After the war he worked for a period as an engineer in Venezuela. He was a frequent contributor to the Croatian emigrant weekly, Hrvatska revija. He secured a visa for Croatian writer Bruno Bušić to come to Spain; Bušić was later assassinated. He published U.S. Policy Towards Yugoslavia, which was translated into English by Mate Meštrović.
