= Juraj Krnjević =

Croatian politician (1895–1988)

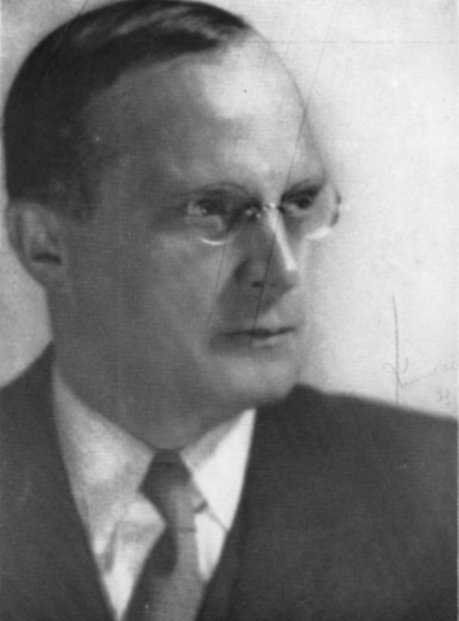

3rd President of the Croatian Peasant Party
- In office 15 May 1964 – 9 January 1988
- Preceded by: Vladko Maček
- Succeeded by: Josip Torbar

First Deputy Prime Minister of Yugoslavia
- In office 11 January 1942 – 10 August 1943
- Monarch: Peter II
- Prime Minister: Slobodan Jovanović Miloš Trifunović
- Preceded by: Slobodan Jovanović
- Succeeded by: Milan Grol

17th Minister of Post, Telegraph and Telephone of Yugoslavia
- In office 11 January 1942 – 10 August 1943
- Monarch: Peter II
- Prime Minister: Slobodan Jovanović Miloš Trifunović
- Preceded by: Josip Torbar
- Succeeded by: Vladeta Milićević

Personal details
- Born: 19 February 1895 Ivanić-Grad, Croatia-Slavonia, Austria-Hungary
- Died: 9 January 1988 (aged 92) London, England
- Party: Croatian Peasant Party
- Children: Krešimir

Juraj Krnjević (19 February 1895 – 9 January 1988) was a Croatian politician who was among the leaders of the Croatian Peasant Party (HSS). He was the party's General Secretary since 1928 and President since 1964. He also served as the First Deputy Prime Minister and Minister of Post, Telegraph and Telephone of Yugoslavia between 1942 and 1943.

== Early life ==
Krnjević was born in Ivanić-Grad (Croatia, then part of Austro-Hungarian Empire). Mate Krnjević and Ana (née Marčinić) had two sons, Juraj and the five years younger Cvjetko. After primary schooling in Ivanić, both brothers went to the classical gymnasium in Zagreb. Juraj went on to study law, and Cvjetko, medicine.

In a country with an overwhelmingly peasant population – freed from serfdom only after 1845 – only a tiny fraction, mainly of town-dwellers, had the right of vote. This was the context in which Stjepan Radić, towards the end of the century, created the agrarian movement for education and electoral emancipation of the peasants, as well as real autonomy for Croatia.

The Croatian situation in the dual monarchy made Juraj especially interested in constitutional law. This took him to Vienna, where, to his amazement, he found that the professor of constitutional law, knowing no Hungarian, was quite ignorant of the Hungarian version of the 1867 Compromise. Juraj therefore spent some months in Budapest, long enough to learn the language and find that, indeed, the Hungarian texts differed significantly – and to the Hungarians’ advantage.

By the end of the World War I, Croatia's situation changed radically. It was free of Austria and Hungary; but, against Radić's vehement opposition, a National Council of the State of Slovenes, Croats and Serbs, made up of local politicians from the defunct Empire, agreed to union with the Kingdom of Serbia in a new Kingdom of Serbs, Croats and Slovenes (later renamed Kingdom of Yugoslavia).

== Political career in Yugoslavia ==
Shortly after he became doctor in law (1919), Krnjević as head of a group of people interested in ongoing political events, invited Stjepan Radić to speak in Ivanić at the time of the agricultural fair – when Radić could be sure of a good audience. The speech went off so well that Krnjević, hugely impressed, immediately decided to accompany Radić on his further tour of Croatia. Thus began an intimate collaboration, formalized when Krnjević became secretary (1922), and then in 1928, general-secretary of the HSS.

He was elected to parliament first in 1920 (its youngest member), and again in 1923, 1925 and 1927; but, as the new (1921) Constitution took no account of Croatian objections, Radić and his party refused to cooperate with successive governments. After much political turbulence, Radić and other HSS leaders (including Krnjević) were jailed in 1925. Seeing no alternative, in a more conciliatory spirit, Radić agreed to accept the status quo, dropped his republican stance, and joined the government. Krnjević now re-entered parliament, becoming minister of social affairs (1925–1927). According to Aleksa Đilas his anti-Serb sentiment and Croatian nationalism made his reputation.

The strife between Croats and Serbs, however, soon resumed. It culminated in the shooting of Radić and several colleagues by a Serbian deputy, in parliament, in 1928. After Radić's death, King Alexander dismissed the parliament, banned the HSS and instituted a personal dictatorship, the January 6th Dictatorship. By this time, the HSS was highly popular in Croatia – and even in other regions, where the peasant population was attracted by its democratic program, promoting a better life for all peasants. Indeed, throughout the interwar period, albeit outlawed, and in spite of ruthless and brutal police action against its supporters, the HSS carried a large majority of Croatian votes at every election. By contrast, ultranationalists led by Ante Pavelić, who rejected any compromise with Belgrade and favoured violent action, never won more than a tiny percentage of the votes.

After Radić's death, political activity being effectively suppressed within Yugoslavia, the party leadership decided that Krnjević and August Košutić (HSS vice-president) should leave the country to press the case for democracy and a federal system in Yugoslavia, with substantial autonomy for Croatia, Košutić in Rome and Vienna, Krnjević in Geneva, at the seat of the League of Nations; while the new president of HSS, Vladko Maček, would remain at home.

== Exile ==
In Geneva, Krnjević edited and printed ‘Croatia’, a multi-lingual newsletter reporting on Yugoslavia's brutal police regime. Both in Geneva and during several journeys to Paris and London, he tried to change the attitude of the Western powers, generally supportive of the centralist state, viewed as a bulwark against both German and Russian expansionism in the Balkans. Attempts to establish more direct contacts with governments were more successful at the Quai d'Orsay in Paris – especially when Léon Blum was in power - than at the Foreign Office in London, which had close ties with Belgrade: Winston Churchill was more receptive, but had little influence.

In spite of their unwillingness to apply pressure on the Belgrade government, Krnjević strongly favoured the Western democracies, as opposed to the fascist regimes of Italy and Germany. He fought against the competing propaganda of ultranationalist Croats (later Ustashi), who had their principal base in Italy. Their leader, Ante Pavelić, tried to convince Benito Mussolini that he could establish Italian hegemony in the Balkans by sending troops to ‘liberate’ Croatia, ahead of any German moves in that direction. Throughout his exile, Krnjević kept in touch with Maček (in Zagreb), regularly sending him reports on the political situation and the attitude of the Western powers towards Yugoslavia's internal problems.

Longer travels in 1935 and 1938 took Krnjević to Canada and the US, where many Croatian emigrants were strong supporters of the HSS. But in Yugoslavia, where Prince Paul ruled as Regent after the assassination of King Alexander in Marseille (1934), the political situation remained essentially unchanged. Though officially banned, the HSS, under the leadership of Maček, was supported by the overwhelming majority of Croats, and even by many Serbs opposed to the authoritarian regime of Milan Stojadinović. Only the prospect of impending war in Europe led the Prince Regent to seek a solution to the glaring divisions that made his country so vulnerable to external pressure. He appointed Dragiša Cvetković as head of a new government, willing to negotiate with the Croats. The resulting agreement with Dr. Maček (Sporazum), in August 1939, created a new Croatian Banovina, with a substantial degree of autonomy within Yugoslavia.

== Return to Yugoslavia ==
Having been nominated to the Senate, Krnjević was now able to return from Geneva, just as war broke out in Poland at the beginning of September 1939.

As secretary-general of the HSS – now in control of the Croatian Banovina – Krnjević was much involved in both party and public affairs. Like the party president, Maček, he believed that the new Banovina provided a reasonable framework for Croatian aspirations to greater autonomy. They hoped that Yugoslavia would escape the horrors of war, but were both convinced that, in the long run, Britain would win. Albeit still generally popular, HSS was under increasing attack – from both right- and let-wing extremists – because of its commitment to a federalist solution for Yugoslavia (Bionich 2005).

As things turned out, the Banovina lasted only 20 months, On March 27, an army – led coup in Belgrade drove out Cvetković and the Regent Prince Paul, installing General Dušan Simović as head of the government and Alexander's son, just short of the age of majority, as the new king, Peter II. Ostensibly against cooperation with Germany, the putsch was largely motivated by strong Serbian resentment against the Croatian Banovina, which was seen as unduly favouring Croats and undermining Serbian predominance in Yugoslavia.

== World War II ==
Only ten days later on April 6, 1941, the German army invaded Yugoslavia and met little resistance. Vladko Maček, refusing to leave his people, asked Krnjević to replace him as vice-premier in the Yugoslav government - now about to flee the country. Together with some other Croat ministers and Ivan Šubašić (the Ban, or head of the new Banovina) Krnjević drove to Pale, near Sarajevo, where they joined the rest of the government. After a further drive to Nikšić (Montenegro), all flew out to Greece. After a few days in Athens, they traveled to Egypt and then to Jerusalem, where the government was reconvened on May 4 by King Peter II. To ensure the support of its Croatian members, one of the first acts of the government was to reaffirm its acceptance of the 1939 Sporazum and the Croatian Banovina. The Palestinian interlude lasted only three weeks. The senior members of government flew from Egypt to England, by a roundabout route via equatorial Africa, arriving in London at the end of June (1941).

Though initially acclaimed in London as war heroes, the prestige of the Yugoslav government fell rapidly as increasingly serious dissensions came to the fore. Consisting mainly of heads of all the principal Yugoslav parties, who objected to being led by a general, the government could not last. Strong anti-Simović feeling and plotting resulted in his early downfall (January 1942) and replacement by Slobodan Jovanović, a respected Serbian intellectual, not tied to any of the major parties - after the March 27 Coup, he had been a member of an ephemeral Regency Council.

Ultimately more serious was the growing estrangement between the Croats (led by Krnjević) and most of the Serbian majority. This came to a head by the summer of 1943. Krnjević was in a very difficult position. Citing Ustashi-led pogroms against Serbs in Pavelić's “Independent” Croatia (but ignoring similar killings of Croats and Bosnian Muslims by Chetniks). Support for the Chetniks was reinforced and formalized by the appointment of their leader, General Draža Mihailović, as War Minister (in absentia). As the outlook for the allies started to improve, the émigré governments in London were urged to proclaim their intention to (re) establish democratic systems in their respective countries. Convinced that the Serb majority in the Yugoslav government had no real intention of implementing genuine democracy – or of restoring the Croatian Banovina – in post-war Yugoslavia, Krnjević, in spite of great pressure from the Foreign Office, refused to be co-signer of Jovanović's declaration of ‘War Aims’.

The crisis led to the resignation of Jovanović on June 24, 1943. It was only temporarily resolved when Miloš Trifunović, a leader of the Serbian People's Radical Party, became prime-minister. Ill feelings between the Croats and Serbs in London were exacerbated by reports of mass killings in Yugoslavia. Other major problems further undermined Trifunović's position. One was the shift of British military and logistic help from Mihailović – staunchly supported by the Serbian majority in the government – to Tito’s partisans. Of a different nature was King Peter's determination to marry the Greek Princess Alexandra: this was firmly opposed by the same Serbian ministers (and also Mihailović), who considered a royal wedding highly inappropriate during wartime.

So the King dismissed Trifunović after only 45 days in office, on August 10, 1943. The royal wedding was of little concern for the Croats, who were probably relieved no longer to be the major target of Serbian discontent. Krnjević made it clear to the King that, in this respect, he should act as he wished. The immediate constitutional crisis was solved by the formation of a government composed of senior civil servants (led by Božidar Purić) who did not object to the King's wedding.

How to deal with the increasing dominance of the Partisans in Yugoslavia was beyond the competence of the Purić government, lacking any political legitimacy. By early 1944, increasingly aware of the communist nature and aims of the Partisan movement, but unwilling (or unable, owing to lack of US support) to preempt a communist takeover by landing troops in Yugoslavia, the British pushed for an agreement between King Peter and the Partisans, that might preserve the Monarchy in post-war Yugoslavia. To lead the negotiations, on June 1, 1944 the King appointed Ivan Šubašić as prime-minister. As Head of the new Croatian Banovina, Šubašić – also member of the HSS – had in fact been the King's representative before the war.

Negotiations with Tito on the island of Vis resulted in the Tito-Šubašić Agreement (14 June), which essentially conceded all the main demands of the Partisans: they would have predominance in the joint government (and in ruling the country), and the King could not return to Yugoslavia before a referendum decided the future of the monarchy. Most of the members of the original émigré government (including Krnjević) urged the King not to accept this proposal. By this time, however, whatever influence they might have had on the course of events was of little consequence. Their situation was no better than that of the other émigré governments from Eastern Europe. Albeit very reluctantly, the King, bowing to intense pressure from Churchill and the Foreign office, signed what proved to be his own demise.

== Post-war exile ==
When the war ended, knowing full well that he would be unable to function politically in the one-party state, Krnjević refused to return to Yugoslavia with Šubašić. As early as in 1943, he had strongly urged the HSS in Croatia to prepare for a takeover of power, as soon as permitted by the military situation – even sending detailed instructions how to proceed (Jelić-Butić, 1983). But in Croatia, the HSS was in great disarray: Maček was under house arrest; and many of its members had gone over to Tito or to Pavelić. Facing little organized resistance as the Germans retreated, the Partisans were soon in full control of the country.

Krnjević's situation was not unlike that in prewar Geneva. There was little he could do directly in Yugoslavia. But there were many Croatian emigrants in North and South America, as well as some in Western Europe – including increasing numbers of Croats working in Germany (‘Gastarbeiter’) – who had been, or were, HSS supporters or potential recruits. He devoted the rest of his life to meeting and organizing émigré HSS groups, especially in Canada and the US, during regular travels to North America. He also wrote frequently for emigrant newspapers, especially for ‘Hrvatski Glas’, edited and published by HSS supporters in Canada.

After Vladko Maček's death in 1964, he became the president of HSS in exile. Both in speeches and articles, he never wavered from his conviction that the never-ending confrontations with Belgrade could be resolved only by negotiations between a free Croatia and a free Serbia.

Krnjević died in London. Only two years after his death, the collapse of the Communist regime would lead to the first free multi-party elections in Croatia's modern history, involving a re-established Croatian Peasant Party.
