= Ante Vokić =

Croatian Ustaše politician and military commander

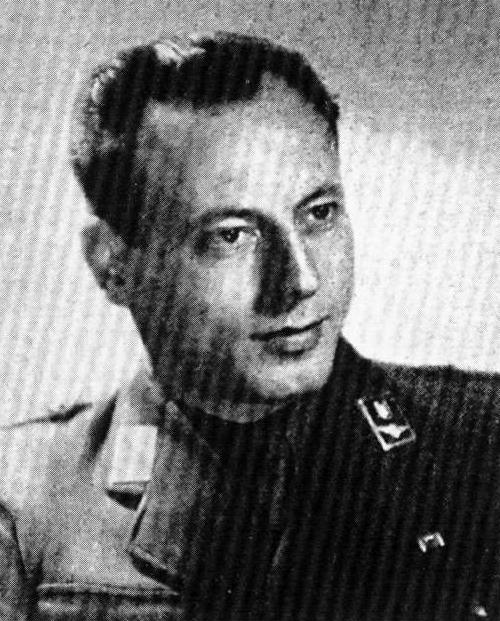

Minister of Armed Forces of the NDH
- In office 29 January 1944 – 8 August 1944
- Prime Minister: Nikola Mandić
- Preceded by: Miroslav Navratil
- Succeeded by: Nikola Steinfl

Minister of Transportation of the NDH
- In office 11 October 1943 – 30 August 1944
- Prime Minister: Nikola Mandić
- Preceded by: Hilmija Bešlagić
- Succeeded by: Jozo Dumandžić

Personal details
- Born: 23 August 1909 Mostar, Bosnia-Herzegovina, Austria-Hungary
- Died: 8 May 1945 (aged 35) Lepoglava Prison, Lepoglava, Independent State of Croatia
- Cause of death: Execution by firing squad
- Party: Ustaše movement
- Spouse: Dragica Vokić
- Profession: Soldier, politician

Military service
- Allegiance: Croatia
- Branch/service: Ustaše Army
- Rank: Krilnik (General)
- Commands: Ustaše Traffic Brigades; Domobranstvo; Ustaše Army

Ante Vokić (23 August 1909 – 8 May 1945) was a Croatian politician, general and putschist. A member of the Ustaše, he was the Minister of Armed Forces of the Independent State of Croatia from 29 January to 30 August 1944, succeeding Miroslav Navratil.

Vokić was one of the leaders of the 1944 Lorković–Vokić plot, an attempt to align the country with the Allies and against the Axis powers. After the plot was uncovered, Vokić was arrested and later executed.

== Biography ==
=== Youth ===
Vokić was born in Mostar on 23 August 1909. He attended a gymnasium in Sarajevo and studied law at University of Zagreb. He ended his studies in 1929 and started working for the train service in Sarajevo. He co-founded the Croatian Academic Club Kranjčević and the newspaper Svijest (Consciousness) and participated in the HKD Napredak.

=== World War II ===
Before the establishment of the Croatian state, Vokić was a member of the Ustaše branch in Zagreb. On 11 April 1941, by order of Slavko Kvaternik, he was sent to serve at headquarters of the newly formed Ustasha Surveillance Service, whose main task was to lead and build up existing Ustaša combat formations and form new ones. Later that year he was appointed Director of Train Services in Sarajevo. He was an organising commander of all Ustaša traffic brigades. As an associate of Jure Francetić, he was a founding member of the Black Legion, an infantry unit of the Ustaše Militia. In 1943, he left Sarajevo and moved to Zagreb and on 11 October of that year he was appointed Minister of Transportation and Public Works.

On 29 January 1944, he was promoted to the Ustaše rank of colonel and named Minister of the Armed Forces. Ante Pavelić promoted him to the highest rank, that of Krilnik (Brigadier General). He became a close associate and friend of Mladen Lorković. Lorković introduced him to Baroness Vraniczany and Baroness Zlata Lubienski, members of high society, who became his good friends. At the beginning of August 1944, he stood as best man at the marriage of Lorković to Countess Nada Von Ghyczy.

==== Lorković–Vokić plot ====
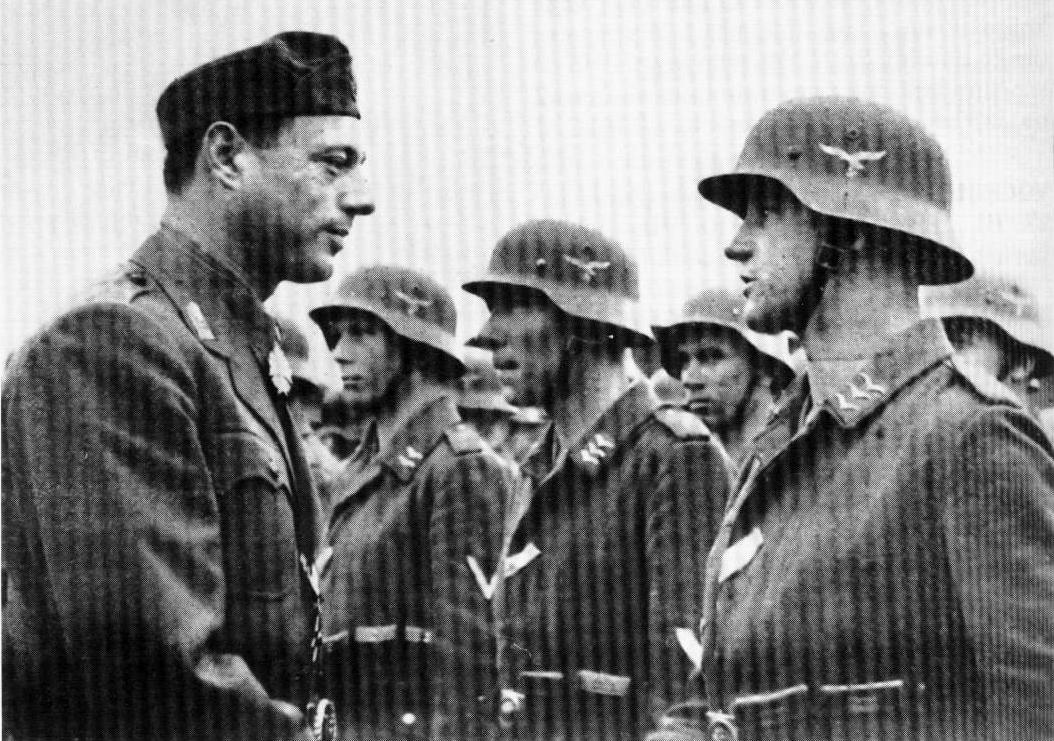
Vokić visits Croatian volunteers in Stockerau

A coup attempt led by Ante Vokić and Mladen Lorković, known as the Lorković–Vokić plot, aimed to switch the Independent State of Croatia from the Axis to the Allies, but it was discovered on 30 August 1944, after which both men were arrested. The coup's goal was for Croatia to switch sides in the war by declaring war on Nazi Germany and entering an alliance with Western allies. He visited the Domobran and Ustaše units and their officers and said they should expect a big event.

He received support from the Domobran officers and lost favour with the Ustaše, who were loyal to Ante Pavelić. He contacted Ivan Faroli, lawyer for Vladko Maček, the president of the Croatian Peasant Party. He informed Faroli about a coup to bring down the Ustaše and give power to the Croatian Peasant Party. This included the replacement of Ustaše's officers with Domobran officers, loyal to the Croatian Peasant Party and disarmament of German units on Croatian territory.

Later Pavelić was visited by a Gestapo officer and told about Germany's new (V2) weapons which would turn the war in its favour. On 21 August 1944, Pavelić informed Siegfried Kasche, the German ambassador, about the coup and announced actions against the putschists. He also accused German general Edmund Glaise von Horstenau of involvement in the coup, because von Horstenau was coaxing Pavelić to approve the coup.

Vokić's friend, Ante Štitić, a high ranking police official who was also involved in the coup, wrote a report after meetings with Lorković (24 August 1944) and Vokić (25 August 1944). He handed the report to the Ustaše units commander, Ivo Herenčić, an old opponent of Vokić. Herenčić gave the report to Pavelić. That report was the main evidence presented against Vokić and Lorković at their trial for "high treason".

=== Death ===
At a sudden government assembly on 30 August 1944, Vokić and Lorković were accused of conspiring against Pavelić and his Croatian allies, mainly Nazi Germany. They were removed the same day from their duties and placed under house arrest. Lorković and Vokić were brought in front of Poglavnik's Bodyguard Unit court. They convicted him, stripped him of his rank and expelled him from the unit. He was later interned in Novi Marof; from there he was moved to Koprivnica with Lorković. He was then jailed in Lepoglava prison and on 8 May 1945, the day Germany surrendered, Vokić was executed.

== Sources ==
- Jelić-Butić, Fikreta (1977). Ustaše i Nezavisna Država Hrvatska 1941–1945 [Ustaše and the Independent State of Croatia 1941–1945] (in Serbo-Croatian). Liber.
- Ravlić, Slaven (1997). "Vokić, Ante". In Dizdar, Zdravko; Grčić, Marko; Ravlić, Slaven; Stuparić, Darko (eds.). Tko je tko u NDH [Who Was Who in the NDH] (in Croatian). Zagreb, Croatia: Minerva. ISBN 978-953-6377-03-9.
- Tomasevich, Jozo (2001). War and Revolution in Yugoslavia, 1941–1945: Occupation and Collaboration. Vol. 2. San Francisco: Stanford University Press. ISBN 0-8047-3615-4.
- Yeomans, Rory (2013). Visions of annihilation : the Ustasha regime and the cultural politics of fascism, 1941–1945. Pittsburgh, United States of America: University of Pittsburgh Press. ISBN 978-082-2961-92-5.
