= Lepoglava prison =

Prison in Croatia

Lepoglava Penitentiary
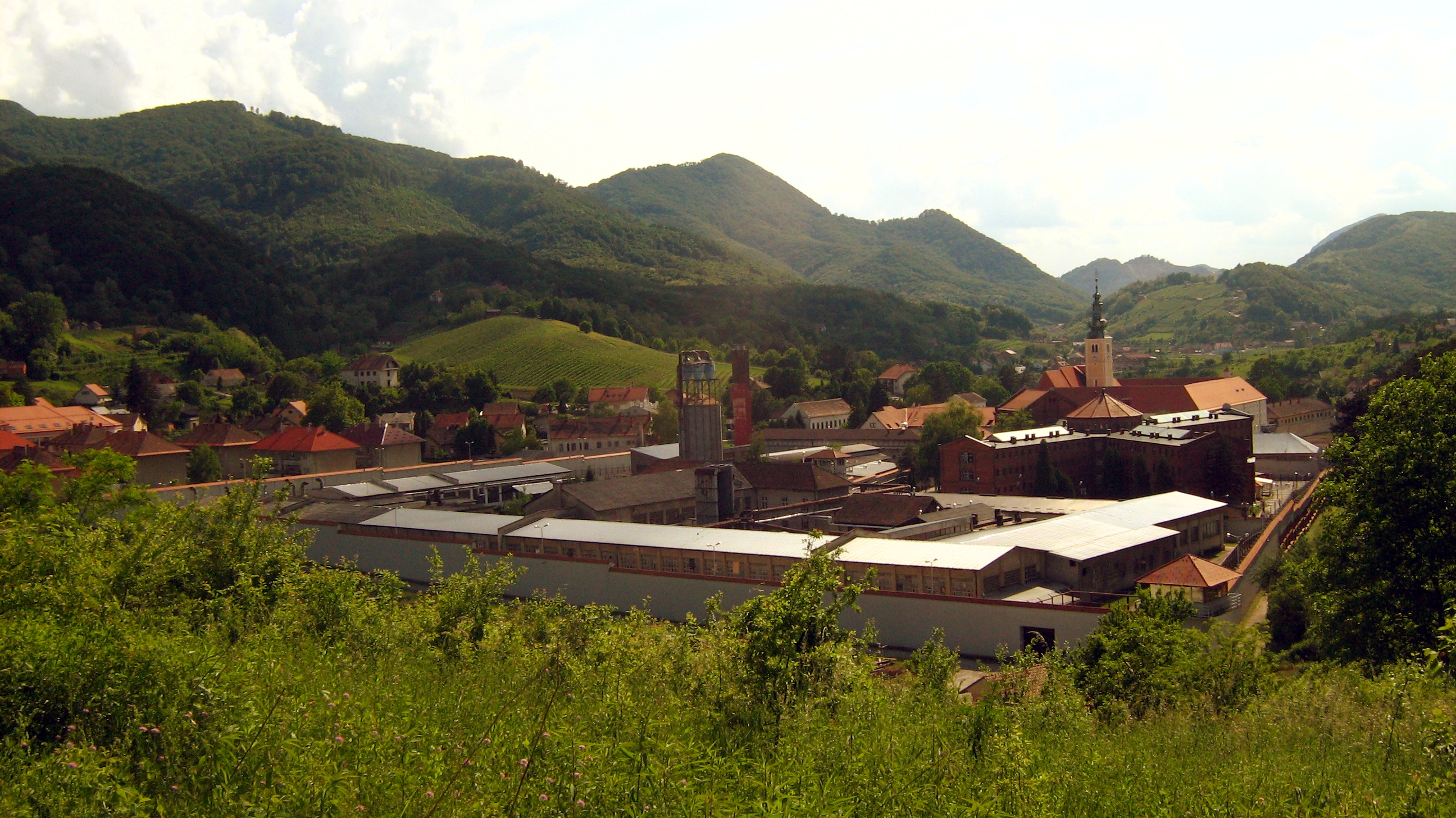
- Interactive map of Lepoglava Penitentiary
- Location: Lepoglava, Ulica Hrvatskih Pavlina 1; 46°12′35″N 16°02′33″E
- Status: Operational
- Security class: Maximum
- Population: 500+
- Opened: 1854; 172 years ago
- Managed by: Croatian Ministry of Justice

Lepoglava Penitentiary (Croatian: Kaznionica u Lepoglavi), also referred to in English as Lepoglava prison, is a maximum security prison in northern Croatia administrated by the Croatian Ministry of Justice. It is located in, and named after, the town of Lepoglava, Varaždin County.

Lepoglava prison served as one of the main political prisons for opponents and seditionists of various ruling regimes throughout its history.

== History ==
Lepoglava prison was formed in 1854 in a monastery formerly owned by the Pauline Fathers, which was transformed by the authorities into a penitentiary (this order would wait until 2001 for a part of its property there to be returned to the bishopric). Prior to becoming one of the major Croatian penitentiaries, the prison saw widespread use in Austria-Hungary, the Kingdom of Yugoslavia, the Independent State of Croatia and Communist Yugoslavia.

In 1878, Lepoglava warden Emil Taufer introduced the Irish rehabilitation system and opened a number of workshops for penal labor. Literacy classes were provided for younger offenders. Over time, the system largely turned into a direct exploitation of inmates' nearly free labor. This was particularly pronounced during World War I, when working up to 15 hours a day in an unsafe working environment and poor overall conditions contributed to high mortality among the prisoners.

During the twentieth century, the prison was a home for numerous "unwanted" groups and political prisoners. This occurred during the Kingdom of Yugoslavia (1918–1941), when Communists and revolutionaries were incarcerated, along with such notables as Josip Broz Tito, Moša Pijade, Rodoljub Čolaković, and Milovan Đilas.

The Independent State of Croatia (1941–45) held dissidents at the prison, including Ante Vokić who attempted a coup in 1944. The prison was used to incarcerate and liquidate over 2,000 anti-fascists. On 12–13 July 1943, the partisans attacked and temporarily captured the facility, freeing around 800 inmates.

Following World War II, notable prisoners included suspected Axis collaborationists such as Aloysius Stepinac and Ivo Tartaglia. On 5 July 1948, three prisoners were killed by prison authorities after a failed escape attempt. After the Croatian Spring, prisoners included Šime Đodan, Dražen Budiša, Vlado Gotovac, Marko Veselica, Dobroslav Paraga and Franjo Tuđman. A memorial to the victims was erected in 2005.

== See also ==
- Political prisoners in Yugoslavia

== Bibliography ==
- Kolar-Dimitrijević, Mira (1989). "Radnička kretanja u lepoglavskom i ivanečkom području u međuratnom razdoblju" (PDF). Radovi Zavoda za znanstveni rad Varaždin (in Croatian) (3): 175–194.
- Škiljan, Filip (2012). Hrvatsko Zagorje u Drugom svjetskom ratu 1941.-1945 (in Croatian). Plejada & Muzeji Hrvatskog zagorja.
