= Vladko Maček =

Croatian politician (1879–1964)

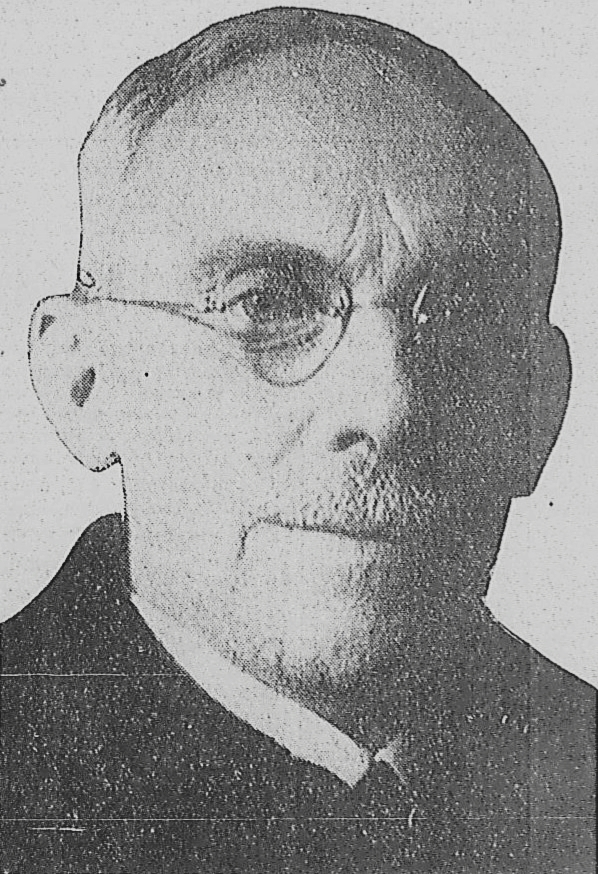
- Maček in 1939

2nd President of the Croatian Peasant Party
- In office 13 August 1928 – 15 May 1964
- Deputy: Josip Predavec August Košutić
- Preceded by: Stjepan Radić
- Succeeded by: Juraj Krnjević

Deputy Prime Minister of Yugoslavia
- In office 26 August 1939 – 7 April 1941
- Monarch: Peter II of Yugoslavia
- Prime Minister: Dragiša Cvetković (until 1941) Dušan Simović (1941)
- Preceded by: Office established
- Succeeded by: Juraj Krnjević

Leader of the Opposition
- In office 13 August 1928 – 26 August 1939
- Monarch: Alexander I of Yugoslavia Peter II of Yugoslavia

Personal details
- Born: 20 June 1879 Jastrebarsko, Croatia-Slavonia, Austria-Hungary
- Died: 15 May 1964 (aged 84) Washington D. C., U.S.
- Party: Croatian Peasant Party
- Children: 2
- Education: University of Zagreb
- Profession: Lawyer
- Awards: Grand Order of King Dmitar Zvonimir (2004)

Military service
- Allegiance: Austria-Hungary
- Branch/service: Army
- Years of service: 1914–1918
- Rank: Captain

Vladimir Maček (20 June 1879 – 15 May 1964) was a politician in the Kingdom of Yugoslavia. As a leader of the Croatian Peasant Party (HSS) following the 1928 assassination of Stjepan Radić, Maček had been a leading Croatian political figure until the Axis invasion of Yugoslavia in 1941. As a leader of the HSS, Maček played a key role in establishment of the Banovina of Croatia, an autonomous banovina in Yugoslavia in 1939.

== Early life ==
Maček was born in Kupinec near Jastrebarsko, southwest of Zagreb. His father Ivan was a Slovene, originally from Lesično, and his mother Ida was of mixed Croatian, on her father's side, and Polish descent on her mother's. At the age of six, Maček started attending elementary school in Kupinec, but continued his education in Zagreb, as his father, a public employee, was transferred there. In Zagreb, Maček enrolled at a gymnasium, which he finished when he was 18 and enrolled at the Faculty of Law, University of Zagreb. He earned a law degree at University of Zagreb. After clerking at various Croatian courts he opened a private law practice in 1908 in Sv. Ivan Zelina. He joined the Croatian Peasant Party at its founding.

=== World War I ===
At the outbreak of the World War I, Maček was a reserve officer. As such, he was mobilised into 25th People's Regiment of the Austro-Hungarian Army as a commander of the 3rd company on 27 July 1914. Maček participated in the Serbian Campaign and was wounded in the Battle of Kolubara while crossing the river Kolubara in November. After returning from hospital in Novi Sad to Zagreb before the Christmas, he was decorated for bravery and promoted to the rank of first lieutenant. Due to his astigmatism, he was declared unfit to serve on the battlefield, and was appointed a commander of an engineer company, composed of Poles and Ukrainians. His company prepared defenses of Budapest, and later Austrian-Hungarian port in Pula, where he served until autumn 1916. From 15 October 1916 until 15 March 1917 he served in occupying forces in Albania.

=== After World War I ===
After World War I, during which he served in the Austro-Hungarian Army, he became a close associate of Stjepan Radić. In 1925, after Radić's visit to Moscow and the Croatian Peasant Party joining the Peasants International, Maček was arrested by the Royal Yugoslav authorities. While in jail, he was elected to the National Assembly. In July 1925, after HSS had joined the government, Maček was released.

== HSS leadership and Banovina of Croatia ==
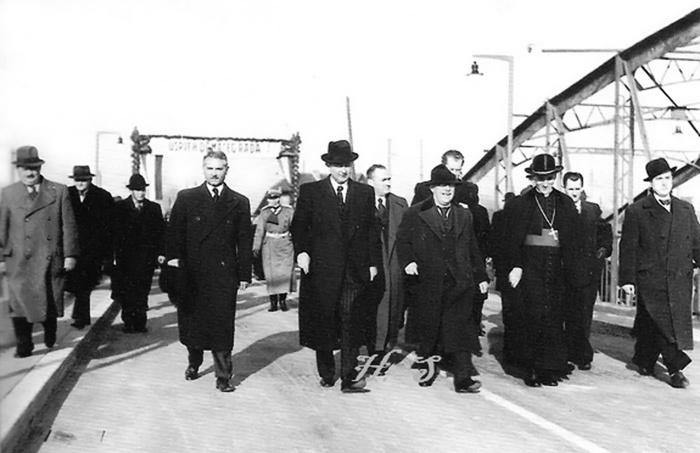
Croatian Ban Ivan Šubašić, Vladko Maček and Archbishop Alojzije Stepinac opening the Sava Bridge in Zagreb

Maček became the leader of the party on 13 August 1928 following Radić's assassination. He quickly became a main opponent of King Alexander and was arrested in April 1933 and sentenced to three years in jail for treason.

Maček was released following Alexander's assassination in 1934. His stated aim during that period was to transform Yugoslavia from a unitary state, dominated by ethnic Serbs, into a new form of state organization in which Croatian statehood would be restored. His ideas appealed to a majority of Croats, and the Croatian Peasant Party gradually gained popularity. He nurtured close relations with other opposition parties in Yugoslavia and, although his coalition lost elections in 1938, it remained a force for reckoning. His persistence and political skills finally paid off in August 1939 with Dragiša Cvetković in the Cvetković–Maček Agreement and the creation of the Banovina of Croatia (Banovina), a semi-autonomous entity which contained Croatia and large sections of today's Bosnia and Herzegovina. HSS became part of the coalition government while Maček himself became deputy prime minister of Yugoslavia.

== World War II ==
This triumph proved to be short-lived as Banovina collapsed along with Yugoslavia when it was invaded by the Axis invasion in April 1941. Seen by Nazi Germany as an ideal leader of a new Axis puppet state—the Independent State of Croatia—Maček was offered the opportunity to become prime minister, but refused the offer twice. He called on the supporters of HSS to respect and co-operate with the new regime of Ante Pavelić, while at the same time delegating Juraj Krnjević to represent the Croatian people in the Yugoslav government-in-exile.

Maček's strategy proved to be detrimental both for his party and himself. In October 1941, he was arrested and interned in Jasenovac concentration camp where he was put under the watch of Ljubo Miloš for some time. Five months later, on 16 March 1942, he was placed under house arrest together with his family at his home in Kupinec. His family shared his internment first in Kupinec, then two months of 1943 (9 January to 9 March) in Luburić's Zagreb apartment (which they shared with Luburić's aged mother and his two sisters), and finally from 9 December 1943 until the collapse of Pavelić's Ustaša regime in May 1945 in his Prilaz 9 house in Zagreb. In the meantime, HSS began to fracture along ideological lines—some of its members joined the Ustaše, while others joined Tito's Partisans. Bitterly opposed to both, in 1945 Maček emigrated first to France, then to the U.S.

Maček addressing the Croatian people about the importance of establishing the Banovina of Croatia, 1940

== Later life ==
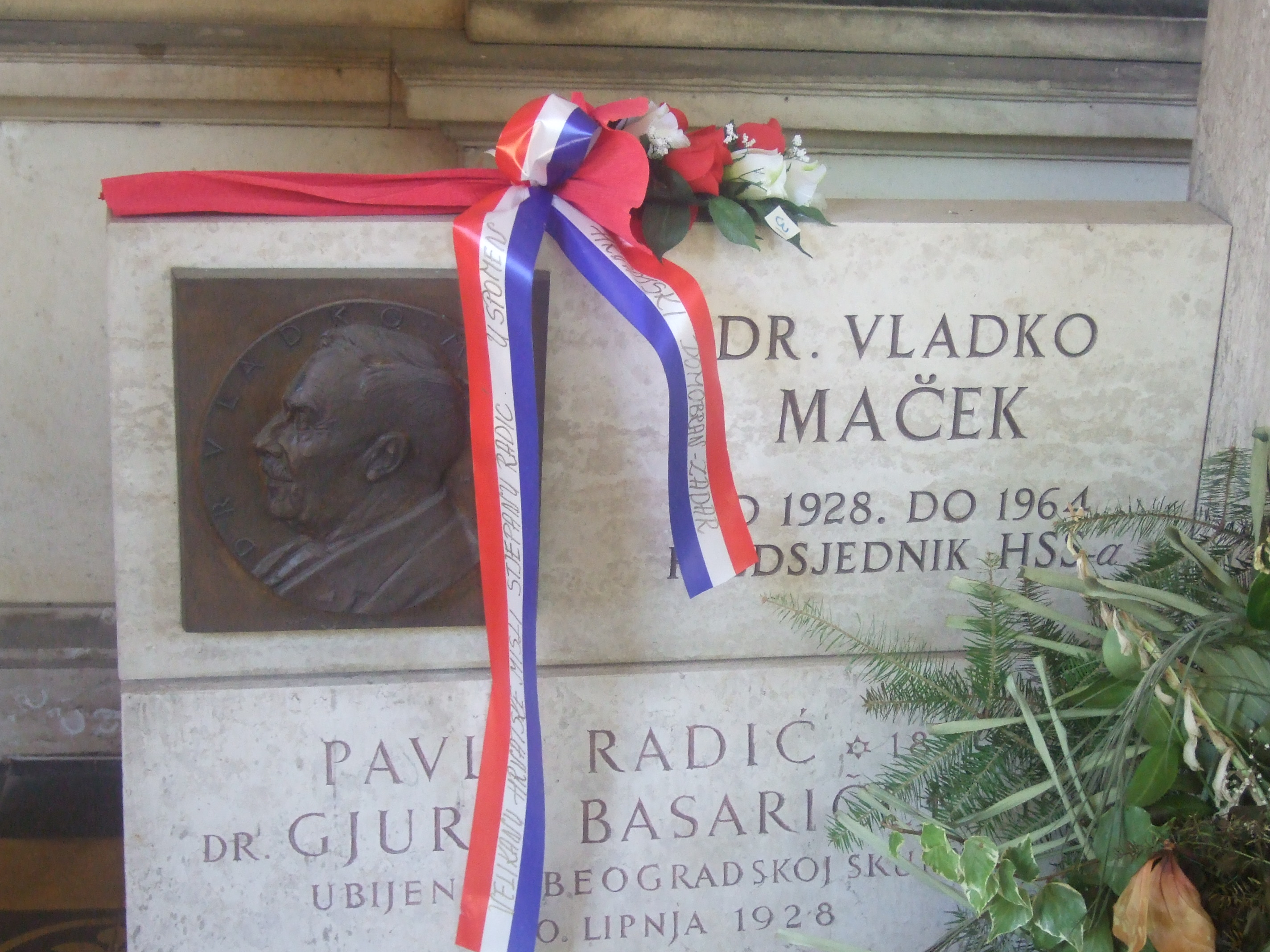
Maček's memorial in the Peasant Party's arcade in Mirogoj

On 12 June 1945, Maček was received by French foreign minister Georges Bidault who offered him the right of domicile in France. He visited the United States for the first time in 1946 after receiving a visa by order of the Department of State. He was received by mayor David L. Lawrence of Pittsburgh while delivering a speech in that city.

Maček helped found the International Peasants' Union along with Georgi Mihov Dimitrov in 1947. He refused offers for the leadership of the numerous Croatian émigré groups. In 1949, he provided much of the material on Yugoslavia for "Communists Crush Churches in Eastern Europe," edited by Reuben H. Markham, who called him "one of the bravest and most devoted champions of common men and women in southeast Europe." He died of a heart attack in Washington, D.C., on 15 May 1964, at 84. His remains were taken to Croatia in 1996 and buried in the Mirogoj cemetery in Zagreb. He was posthumously awarded the Grand Order of King Dmitar Zvonimir in 2004.

== See also ==
- Stanisław Maczek, Vladko Maček's cousin

== Sources ==
- Perić, Ivo (2003). Vladko Maček: Politički portret (PDF) (in Croatian). Zagreb: Tehnička knjiga. ISBN 978-953-212-155-1. Archived from the original (PDF) on 31 December 2013.
- Ramet, Sabrina P. (2006). The Three Yugoslavias: State-Building and Legitimation, 1918–2005. Bloomington, IN: Indiana University Press. ISBN 978-0-253-34656-8.
