= Krašić =

- Municipality
- Municipality of Krašić
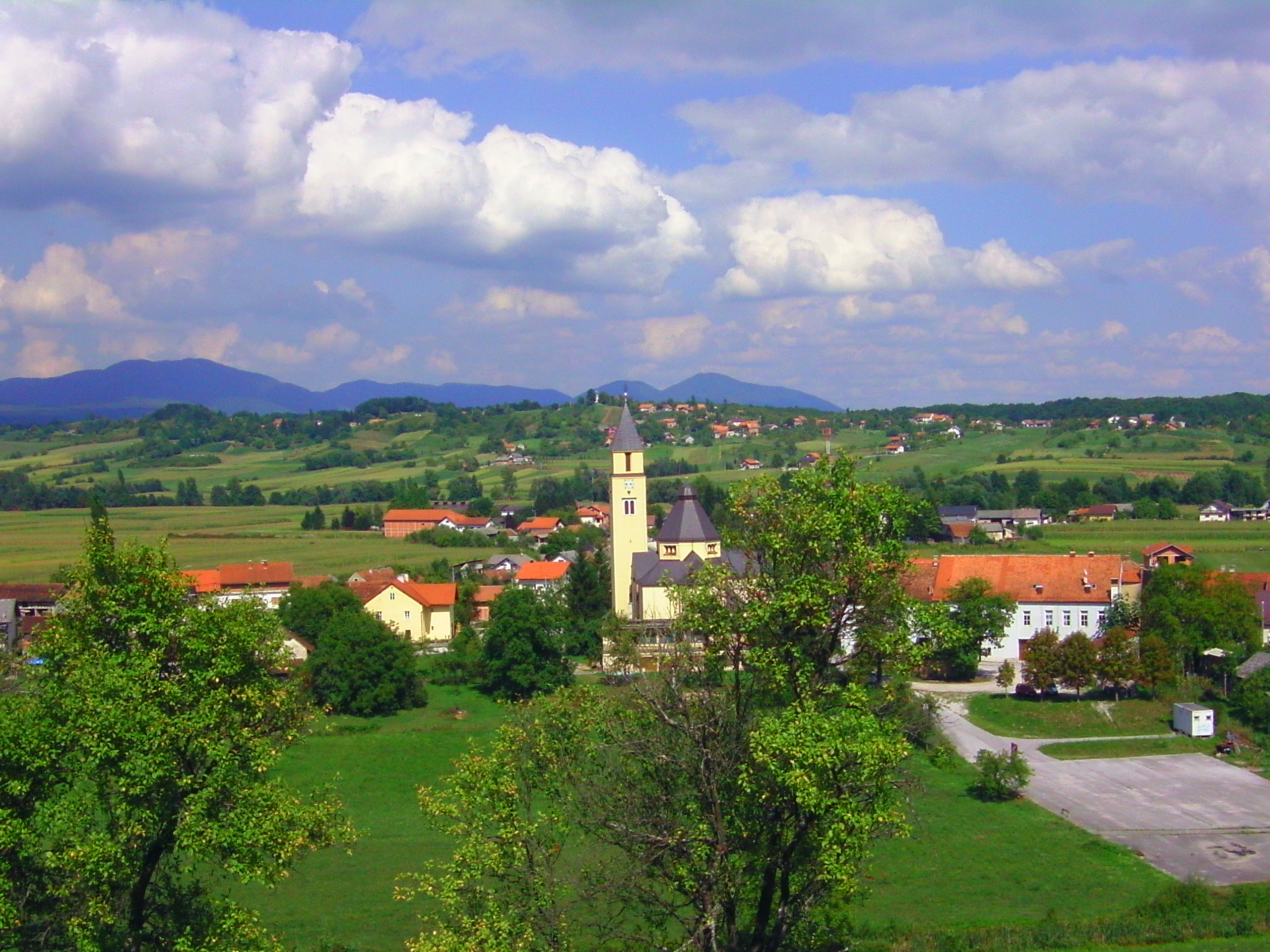

- Location of Krašić in Croatia
- Coordinates: 45°39′N 15°31′E
- Country: Croatia
- County: Zagreb County

Area
  - Municipality: 71.5 km^{2} (27.6 sq mi)
  - Urban: 2.7 km^{2} (1.0 sq mi)

Population (2021)
  - Municipality: 2,250
  - Density: 31.5/km^{2} (81.5/sq mi)
  - Urban: 542
  - Urban density: 200/km^{2} (520/sq mi)
- Time zone: UTC+1 (Central European Time)
- Vehicle registration: ZG
- Website: krasic.hr

Krašić is a village and municipality in central Croatia, located near Jastrebarsko and Ozalj, south of Žumberak and north of Kupa, about 50 km southwest of Zagreb. Krašić comprises an area of about 3.63 km^{2}. In the 2011 census, the total population was 2,640, in the following settlements:

- Barovka, population 18
- Begovo Brdo Žumberačko, population 13
- Brezarić, population 270
- Brlenić, population 195
- Bukovica Prekriška, population 33
- Careva Draga, population 5
- Čučići, population 0
- Čunkova Draga, population 24
- Dol, population 174
- Donje Prekrižje, population 48
- Gornje Prekrižje, population 50
- Hrženik, population 106
- Hutin, population 102
- Jezerine, population 32
- Konjarić Vrh, population 18
- Kostel Pribićki, population 50
- Krašić, population 616
- Krnežići, population 34
- Krupače, population 54
- Kučer, population 32
- Kurpezova Gorica, population 9
- Medven Draga, population 31
- Mirkopolje, population 93
- Pećno, population 10
- Pribić, population 262
- Pribić Crkveni, population 173
- Prvinci, population 8
- Radina Gorica, population 17
- Rude Pribićke, population 19
- Staničići Žumberački, population 2
- Strmac Pribićki, population 111
- Svrževo, population 28
- Vranjak Žumberački, population 3

In the 2011 census, the inhabitants were almost all Croats (99.43%).

Krašić is the birthplace of the late Croatian Cardinal Blessed Aloysius Stepinac.
