= Aloysius Stepinac =

Croatian Latin Catholic cardinal (1898–1960)

Blessed Aloysius Stepinac
- Cardinal; Archbishop of Zagreb
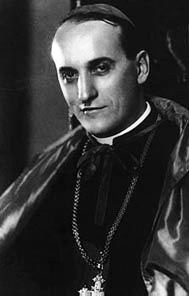
- Church: Catholic Church (Latin Church)
- Archdiocese: Zagreb
- See: Zagreb
- Appointed: 7 December 1937
- Installed: 1938
- Term ended: 10 February 1960
- Predecessor: Antun Bauer
- Successor: Franjo Šeper
- Other post: Cardinal-Priest of San Paolo alla Regola
- Previous posts: Titular Archbishop of Nicopsis (1934–1937); Coadjutor Archbishop of Zagreb (1934–1937)

Orders
- Ordination: 26 October 1930 by Giuseppe Palica
- Consecration: 24 June 1934 by Antun Bauer
- Created cardinal: 12 January 1953 by Pope Pius XII
- Rank: Cardinal-Priest

Personal details
- Born: Alojzije Viktor Stepinac; 8 May 1898 Brezarić, Croatia-Slavonia, Austria-Hungary (modern Croatia)
- Died: 10 February 1960 (aged 61) Krašić, PR Croatia, FPR Yugoslavia (modern Croatia)
- Buried: Zagreb Cathedral
- Residence: Krašić
- Education: Pontifical Gregorian University
- Motto: In te, Domine, speravi; ("In Thee, O Lord, have I hoped")
- Coat of arms: Aloysius Stepinac's coat of arms

Sainthood
- Feast day: 10 February
- Venerated in: Catholic Church
- Beatified: 3 October 1998; Marija Bistrica, Croatia by Pope John Paul II
- Attributes: Cardinal's attire; Palm; Crozier
- Patronage: Croatia; Archdiocese of Zagreb; Patients; Prisoners; Priests; Students; Farmers

Styles of Aloysius Stepinac
- Reference style: His Eminence
- Spoken style: Your Eminence
- Informal style: Cardinal
- See: Zagreb

Aloysius Viktor Stepinac (Croatian: Alojzije Viktor Stepinac, 8 May 1898 – 10 February 1960) was a Croatian prelate of the Catholic Church. Made a cardinal in 1953, Stepinac served as Archbishop of Zagreb from 1937 until his death.

He served during the Kingdom of Yugoslavia, as well as during World War II when the Axis-supported Croatian fascist Ustaše regime ruled the Independent State of Croatia (NDH). Following the war, he was tried by the communist Yugoslav government and convicted of treason and collaboration with the Ustaše regime. The trial was depicted in the West as a typical communist "show trial", and was described by The New York Times as biased against Stepinac. However, John Van Antwerp Fine Jr. was of the opinion that the trial was "carried out with proper legal procedure". In a verdict that polarized public opinion both in Yugoslavia and beyond, the Yugoslav authorities found him guilty on the charge of high treason (for collaboration with the Ustaše), as well as complicity in the forced conversions of Orthodox Serbs to Catholicism. Stepinac advised individual priests to admit Orthodox believers to the Catholic Church if their lives were in danger, such that this conversion had no validity, allowing them to return to their faith once the danger passed. Jozo Tomasevich notes that Stepinac and the Church were "willing to cooperate with the regime's forced conversions, provided the canonical rules were followed", when in fact the Ustaše ignored these rules, committing atrocities, including the mass killing of converts.

Stepinac was sentenced to 16 years in prison, but served only five at Lepoglava before being released, with his movements confined to his home district of Krašić. In 1953 he was elevated to the rank of cardinal by Pope Pius XII. He was unable to participate in the 1958 conclave due to government restrictions on his travel. On 10 February 1960, still confined to Krašić, Stepinac died of polycythemia, for which he had been receiving treatment for a number of years. On 3 October 1998, Pope John Paul II declared him a martyr and beatified him before 500,000 Croatians in Marija Bistrica near Zagreb.

His record during World War II, conviction for treason, and subsequent beatification remain controversial. Some point to Stepinac's efforts to save individual Jews, while others note that his public support of the Nazi-puppet NDH gave it legitimacy, helping the Ustaše maintain power and commit genocides against Jews, Serbs and Roma. Criticism has also been levelled for Stepinac's failure to speak out publicly against the genocide of the Serbs, against forced conversions and the killing of 157 Orthodox priests and 5 bishops, among other Ustaše crimes against Serbs. On 22 July 2016, the Zagreb County Court annulled his post-war conviction due to "gross violations of current and former fundamental principles of substantive and procedural criminal law". Pope Francis invited Serbian prelates to participate in canonization investigations, but in 2017 a joint commission was only able to agree that "[i]n the case of Cardinal Stepinac, the interpretations that were predominantly given by Catholic Croats and Orthodox Serbs remain divergent".

== Early life ==
Alojzije Viktor Stepinac was born in Brezarić, a village in the district of Krašić in the Austro-Hungarian Kingdom of Croatia-Slavonia on 8 May 1898, to a wealthy viticulturalist, Josip Stepinac, and his second wife Barbara (née Penić). He was the fifth of nine children, (Note: According to other sources, there were only eight children.) and he had three more siblings from his father's first marriage.

His mother, a devout Roman Catholic, prayed constantly that he would enter the priesthood. The family moved to Krašić in 1906, and Stepinac attended primary school there, then attended high school in Zagreb from 1909 to 1915, boarding at the Archdiocese of Zagreb orphanage. This was followed by study at the lycée of the archdiocese, as he was seriously considering taking holy orders, having sent in his application to the seminary at the age of 16.

He was conscripted into the Austro-Hungarian Army for service in World War I, and had to accelerate his studies and graduate ahead of schedule. Sent to a reserve officers school in Rijeka, after six months training he was sent to serve on the Italian Front in 1917 where he commanded Bosnian soldiers. In July 1918, he was captured by Italian forces who held him as a prisoner of war. His family was initially told that he had been killed, and a memorial service held in Krašić. A week after the service, his parents received a telegram from their son telling them he had been captured. He was held in various Italian prisoner-of-war camps until 6 December 1918.

After the formation of the State of Slovenes, Croats and Serbs on 1 December 1918, he was no longer treated as an enemy soldier, and he volunteered for the Yugoslav Legion that had been engaged on the Salonika front. As the war had already ended, he was demobilized with the rank of second lieutenant and returned home in the spring of 1919. (Note: According to one source, Stepinac was awarded the Order of Karađorđe's Star for his service with the Yugoslav Legion.)

After the war he enrolled at the Faculty of Agriculture at the University of Zagreb, but left it after only one semester and returned home to help his father in his vineyards. (Note: According to one source, Stepinac stayed in Zagreb for five years, studying agriculture and being active in church affairs, including Catholic youth organisations.) His father wanted him to marry, and in 1923 he was briefly engaged to a teacher, Marija Horvat, but the engagement was broken off. (Note: According to one source, Stepinac fell in love with Marija and proposed, but she called the wedding off, saying they didn't belong together. Another source states that Stepinac called off the engagement as he had decided to enter the priesthood.) In 1922, Stepinac was part of the politically conservative Catholic Hrvatski orlovi (Croatian Eagles) youth sport organisation, and traveled to the mass games in Brno, Czechoslovakia. He was at the front of the group's ceremonial procession, carrying the Croatian flag.

On 28 October 1924, at the age of 26, Stepinac entered the Collegium Germanicum et Hungaricum in Rome to study for the priesthood. During his studies there he befriended the future Austrian cardinal Franz König when the two played together on a volleyball team. Granted an American scholarship, he went on to study for doctorates in both theology and philosophy at the Pontifical Gregorian University. Along with Croatian, he was fluent in Italian, German and French.

He was ordained on 26 October 1930 by Archbishop Giuseppe Palica, Vicegerent of Rome, in a ceremony which also included the ordination of his eventual successor as Archbishop of Zagreb, Franjo Šeper. On 1 November, he said his first mass at the Basilica di Santa Maria Maggiore. Stepinac wanted to serve the common people, and wanted to be a parish priest.

He celebrated his first mass in his home parish of Krašić on 1 July 1931, but instead of being appointed to a parish he was appointed as liturgical master of ceremonies to the Archbishop of Zagreb Antun Bauer on 1 October. He also established the archdiocesan branch of the Catholic charity Caritas in December of that year, and initiated and edited the Caritas magazine. He also temporarily administered the parishes of Samobor and Sveti Ivan Zelina. By this time, Stepinac had become a strong Croatian nationalist, but was not active in Catholic Action or the politically conservative Croatian Catholic movement. He was considered "conscientious and devoted to his work".

== Coadjutor archbishop ==
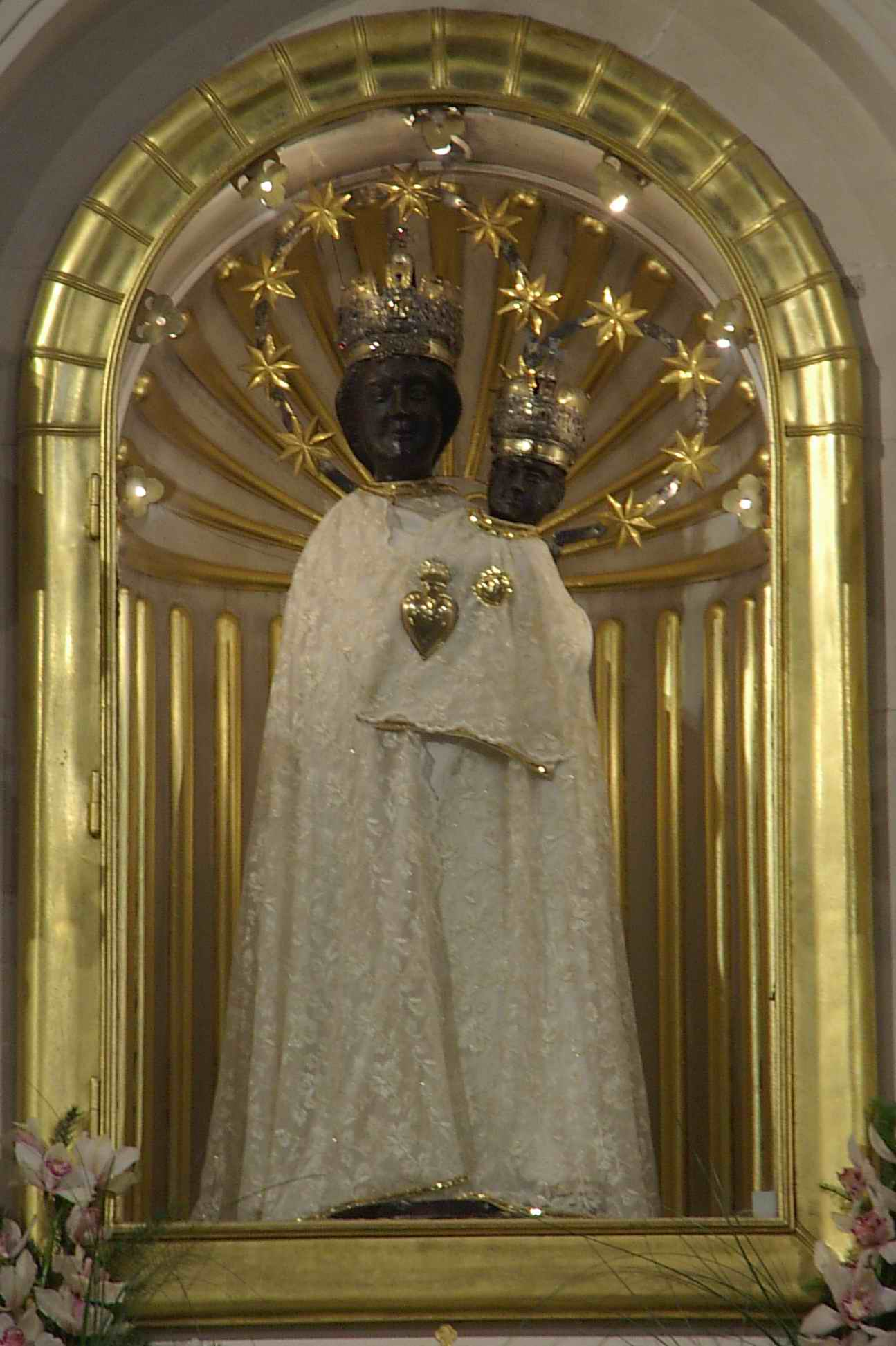
The Black Madonna of Marija Bistrica, to which Stepinac led a pilgrimage soon after his consecration

=== Appointment ===
Stepinac was appointed coadjutor bishop to Bauer on 28 May 1934 at the age of 36 years, having been a priest for only three-and-a-half years, being selected after all other candidates had been rejected. Both Pope Pius XI and King Alexander I of Yugoslavia agreed with his appointment, and although the king wanted to withdraw his assent after he received further information about Stepinac, he was dissuaded by Bauer. According to some sources, Stepinac was the fifth or even eighth candidate to be considered for the role, which brought with it the right to succeed Bauer. Stepinac's decision to join the Yugoslav Legion in 1918 made him a more acceptable candidate to King Alexander.

According to Stepinac's biographer, Friar Šimun Ćorić, Bauer asked Stepinac if he would give his formal consent to being named as Bauer's successor, but after considering the issue for several days, Stepinac refused, saying that he considered himself unfit to be appointed as a bishop. In this version of events, Bauer persisted, and once it was clear that King Alexander had agreed to his appointment, Stepinac consented. Upon his naming, he took In te, Domine, speravi (I place my trust in You, my Lord) as his motto.

At the time of his consecration on 24 June 1934, Stepinac was the youngest bishop in the Catholic Church, and was completely unknown to the Croat people. Two weeks after his consecration, he led a 15,000-strong pilgrimage to the old Marian shrine of the Black Madonna at Marija Bistrica. Stepinac followed this with annual pilgrimages to the site. Bauer delegated many tasks and responsibilities to Stepinac, and he travelled widely within the country.

=== Political situation ===
Stepinac's appointment came at a time of acute political turmoil in Yugoslavia. In June 1928, the popular leader of the Croatian Peasant Party (Hrvatska seljačka stranka, HSS) Stjepan Radić and several other Croatian deputies had been shot by a Serb deputy, Puniša Račić, in the Yugoslav Parliament. Two had died immediately and Radić had succumbed to his wounds two months later, the incident causing widespread outrage among Croats. In January of the following year, King Alexander had prorogued Parliament and had effectively become a royal dictator.

In April 1933, the new leader of the HSS Vladko Maček had been sent to prison for three years on charges of separatism after he and other opposition figures had issued the Zagreb Points condemning the royal regime and its policies. While Maček was in prison, his deputy Josip Predavec was apparently murdered by the police. When Stepinac wanted to visit Maček in prison to thank him for his well-wishes on Stepinac's appointment as coadjutor bishop, his request was denied.

In response to the many messages of support, Stepinac "was sincerely thankful for all the congratulations, but said that he was not enthusiastic about the appointment because it was too heavy a cross for him".

On 30 July 1934, Stepinac received the French deputy Robert Schuman, whom he told: "There is no justice in Yugoslavia. ... The Catholic Church endures much". Throughout 1934, Stepinac spoke with veteran Croatian politician and de facto head of the HSS Ante Trumbić on several occasions. On his views regarding the Kingdom of Yugoslavia, Trumbić recorded that Stepinac had

loyalty to the state as it is, but with the condition that the state acts towards the Catholic Church as it does to all just denominations and that it guarantees them freedom.

After his consecration, Stepinac visited Belgrade to pledge his allegiance to King Alexander. The journalist Richard West quotes Stepinac:

I told the King that I was not a politician and that I would forbid my clergy to take part in party politics, but on the other hand I would look for full respect for the rights of Croats. I warned the King that the Croats must not be improperly provoked and even forbidden to use the very name of Croat, something which I had myself experienced.

On 9 October 1934, King Alexander was assassinated in Marseille by a Bulgarian gunman backed by the Croatian nationalist organisation, the Ustaše. Stepinac, along with Bishops Antun Akšamović, Dionizije Njaradi and Gregorij Rožman, were given special permission by the Papal Nuncio in Belgrade to attend the Serbian Orthodox funeral. Less than a month after the assassination, Stepinac was among those who signed what became known as the "Zagreb Memorandum", which listed a number of demands, including the exoneration of Maček, a general amnesty, freedom of movement and association, restrictions on the activities of government-authorised paramilitaries, and free elections. The key demand of the Memorandum was that the regency that had succeeded the king should address the "Croatian question", the desire of many Croats for self-determination.

=== Other activities ===
In 1936, he climbed Mount Triglav, the tallest peak in Yugoslavia. In 2006, the 70th anniversary of his climb was commemorated with a memorial chapel being built near the summit. In July 1937, he led a pilgrimage to the Holy Land (then the British Mandate of Palestine). During the pilgrimage, he blessed an altar dedicated to the martyr Nikola Tavelić, who had already been beatified at that time, and was later canonised as a saint. After his return from Palestine, Stepinac began a campaign for the canonisation of Tavelić, and proposed that a monument to him be built in the Velebit mountains overlooking the Adriatic Sea.

== Archbishop of Zagreb ==
The creation of the Banovina of Croatia was Prince Paul's attempt to address the "Croatian question"

On 7 December 1937, Bauer died, and though still below the age of forty, Stepinac succeeded him as Archbishop of Zagreb. Presaging the Ustaše reign of terror during World War II, Stepinac addressed a group of university students during Lent in 1938, saying,

Love for one's own nation must not turn a man into a wild animal, which destroys everything and calls for reprisal, but it must enrich him, so that his own nation respects and loves other nations.

In 1938, the Kingdom of Yugoslavia held its last election before the outbreak of war. Stepinac voted for Maček's opposition list, while Radio Belgrade spread the false information that he had voted for Milan Stojadinović's Yugoslav Radical Union. In the latter half of 1938, Stepinac had an operation for acute appendicitis.

In 1940, Stepinac received the regent Prince Paul at St. Mark's Church as he arrived in Zagreb to garner support for the 1939 Cvetković–Maček Agreement, which had created the autonomous Banovina of Croatia within Yugoslavia. The Agreement was intended to address the "Croatian question", but did not satisfy those demanding full independence. Pope Pius XII declared the period from 29 June 1940 to 29 June 1941 as a jubilee year to celebrate 1300 years of Christianity among the Croats. In 1940, the Franciscan Order celebrated 700 years in Croatia and the order's Minister General Leonardo Bello came to Zagreb for the event. During his visit, Stepinac joined the Third Order of Saint Francis, on 29 September 1940. After the death of Bauer, Stepinac attempted to remain aloof from politics, and tried to unify Croatian Catholic organisations and subordinate them directly to his authority. He was unable to achieve this, probably because he was young and relatively inexperienced, and did not command the level of respect and authority usually accorded an Archbishop of Zagreb.

The historian Mark Biondich observes that the Catholic Church had historically been on the fringes of Croatian mass politics and public life, and that the influence of the Church had been further eroded during the interwar period due to the royal dictatorship and the popularity of the anti-clerical HSS.

== Political and religious views prior to World War II ==
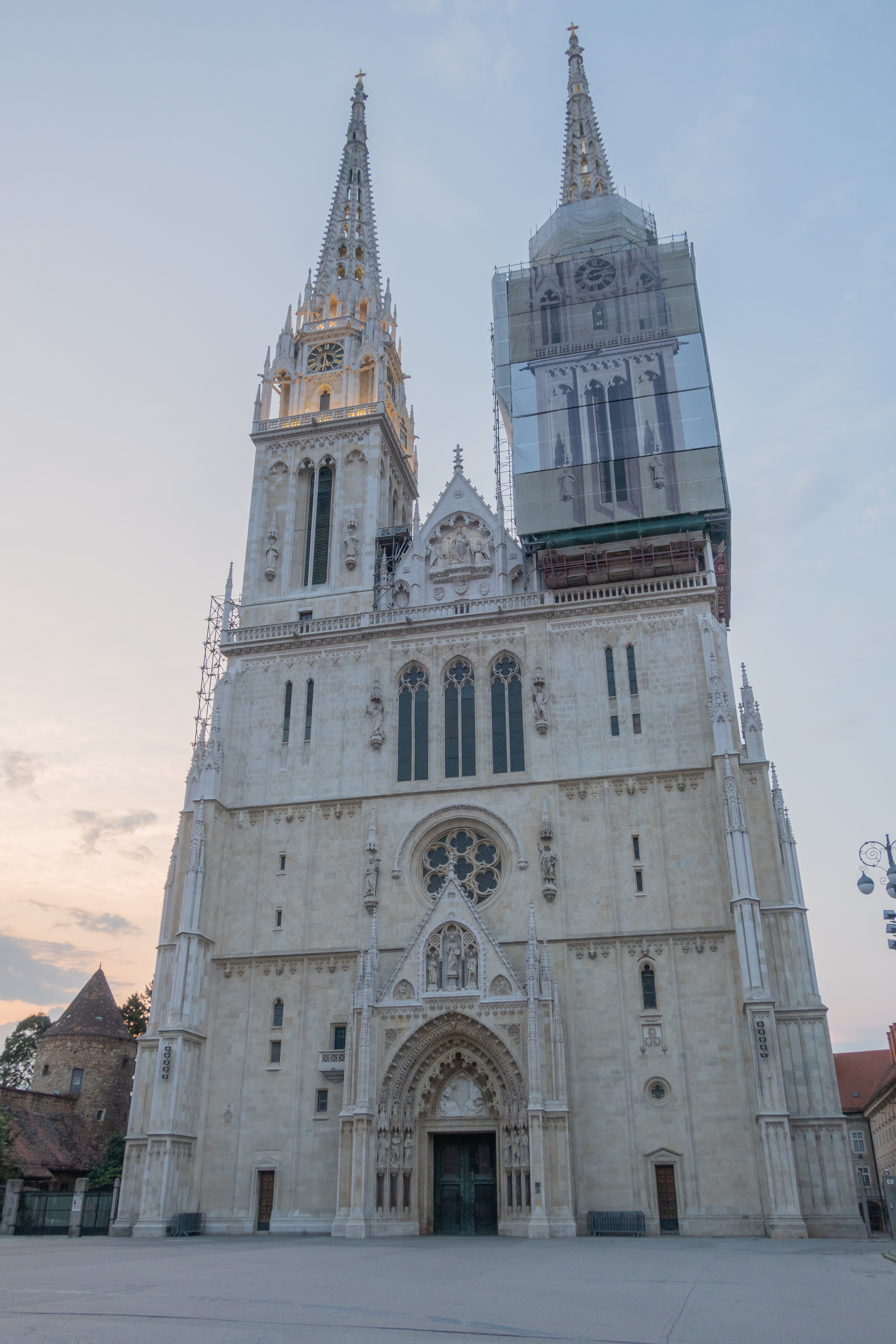
Zagreb Cathedral

During his period as coadjutor archbishop and as Archbishop of Zagreb up to the German-led Axis invasion of Yugoslavia in April 1941, Stepinac made his views clear on a number of political and religious issues. Foremost among these statements were those regarding Protestantism, Eastern Orthodoxy, communism and Freemasonry.

Stepinac criticized Protestantism, stating in a speech in 1938 that "the Catholic Church was the greatest civilising force in human history", and railed against those that wanted to deprive the Catholic Church of any influence in public life. He referred to the Reformation as the "Deformation", and denounced Luther as a false prophet who "demolished the principles of legal authority given by the Lord". He went on to blame Protestantism for the "hell in which human society suffers today", and said that it had opened the road to "anarchy in all forms of human life." Stepinac was also highly critical of Eastern Orthodoxy, seeing it as a serious danger to both the Catholic Church and Croats in general. The day after the Yugoslav coup d'état of 27 March 1941, carried out by British-supported Serb officers against a pact with the Axis powers, he wrote in his diary:

All in all, Croats and Serbs are two worlds, the north and south poles, which will never become close except by a miracle of God. The schism is the greatest curse of Europe, almost greater than Protestantism. In it there is no morality, no principle, no truth, no justice, no honesty.

On the same day he issued an encyclical to his clergy, calling on them to pray for the young king, and that Croatia and Yugoslavia would be "spared the horrors of war". This was consistent with long-standing practice of the Catholic Church to show loyalty to the state and its leadership.

Stepinac was well aware that an estimated 200,000 mostly Croatian Catholics had converted to the Serbian Orthodox Church in the interwar period. He later claimed that Catholics were forced to convert to Orthodoxy during the period between the wars, but according to the historian Jozo Tomasevich, the principal reason for their conversions was the pro-Serb public policy in the Serb-dominated Yugoslav state meant that it was advantageous both politically and for career prospects to be a member of the dominant religion. Tomasevich also notes that despite the fact that it was the national church of the dominant nation in the country, the Serb Orthodox Church felt threatened by Rome, particularly in Bosnia where the Catholic Church was extremely dynamic - in just one diocese, encompassing half of Bosnia's Catholics, it created 17 new parishes in the interwar period. Tomasevich cites Vladko Maček, the leading prewar Croatian opposition leader, who when attacked by an Ustaše priest, for failing to state in his autobiography that the Catholic Church was persecuted in prewar Yugoslavia, Maček responded: "I could not write about the persecution of the Catholic Church because to the best of my knowledge such persecution did not exist." Yet, Stepinac viewed the Yugoslav state as essentially anti-Catholic, particularly after the failure of the Yugoslav Parliament to ratify the already signed Concordat with the Vatican, which would have put the Catholic Church on a more equal footing with the Orthodox Church. He was also sensitive to the fact that the Concordat had been vetoed in the Yugoslav parliament partly due to pressure exerted by the Serbian church.

The political scientist Sabrina P. Ramet has detailed a range of anti-Catholic aspects to the interwar Yugoslav state, including that King Alexander tried to regulate the religious life of the state, entrenching discrimination against adherents of religious groups other than the Serbian Orthodox Church, and trying to erode their influence by allowing Orthodox proselytising in Catholic areas. Yet Stella Alexander states that both the Catholic and Orthodox churches proselytized in interwar years, with the Catholic Church doing so more openly and aggressively than the Orthodox, especially in Bosnia Hercegovina which had a mixed Catholic, Muslim and Orthodox population. The press was used to accuse the Catholic Church of being pro-fascist. The government promoted the Old Catholic Church, a rival organisation which has been established when some Catholics refused to accept the doctrine of papal infallibility after the First Vatican Council. Despite the fact that in 1921, Catholics made up 39.3 per cent of the population, and Orthodox comprised 46.7 per cent, the Ministry of Faiths initially allocated fourteen times more money to the Orthodox Church than the Catholic Church. While this was adjusted, the funding proportions remained very inequitable. All of these strategies worked to undermine the role of the Catholic Church in Yugoslavia. The promotion of Serbdom was at the centre of government education policy, with school books promoting the importance of Serbian Orthodox monasteries in Dalmatia while ignoring Catholic ones. The official newspaper of the Serbian Orthodox Church stated that it wanted to achieve the "victory of Serbian Orthodoxy" throughout Yugoslavia. Under the constant pressure from the state and the Serbian Orthodox Church, between 1923 and 1931 the proportion of Catholics in Yugoslavia declined to 37.4 per cent and that of Serbian Orthodox believers increased to 48.7 per cent. The Croatian theologian Roko Rogošić claimed that 100,000 Roman Catholics had converted to Eastern Orthodoxy under pressure from the Yugoslav government and the Serbian Orthodox Church in 1935 alone. However, census data contradict these claims, showing a slightly greater percentage increase in the number of Catholic Croats compared to Orthodox Serbs in both Croatia and Bosnia in the interwar years.

In 1930's Croatia the Catholic movement shifted rightward toward authoritarian, radical Catholicism. Under Stepinac the hierarchical Crusaders Catholic youth organization grew to 40,000 members by 1938. Via uniformed parades and public rallies, and their slogan "God, Church, Homeland", they blended radical Catholicism and Croat nationalism, opposing liberalism, communism and Greater Serbianism They adopted a Greater Croatia ideology, which envisaged Croatia expanding its borders to claim Bosnia-Herzegovina and Bačka. In 1941 the Crusaders became enthusiastic supporters of the Ustaše regime. Stepinac was the leader of the Croatian Catholic Action in the Zagreb Archdiocese, whose newspaper, Hrvatska straža (Croatian Guard) proclaimed they are "always radical Croats and always radical Catholics", that "communism is the greatest evil" and "the fruit of the Jew Karl Marx". In the Spanish Civil War they sided with Franco, Italy and Germany, because "they do not tolerate Jews or communists or insidious, dangerous Freemasonry." Katolički list, the official newspaper of Stepinac's archdiocese, proclaimed: "Jews are the main enemies of humanity. They are the true curse of the human race." On the domestic front, Catholic newspapers especially attacked the politics of the Croatian Peasants Party and Vladko Maček in particular. In the late 1930s a significant segment of the Croatian Catholic movement attacked the Croatian Peasant Party's commitment to democracy, pacifism and negotiation, and instead moved toward independence and authoritarianism, with prominent Catholic intellectuals joining the Ustaše before WWII. After 1941, these Catholic activists - men like Ivo Guberina, Milivoj Magdić, Ivan Oršanić, Ivo Bogdan and others - became leading Ustaše propagandists and apologists, some served as officials in the Ustaše regime. Thus a leader of the Crusaders, Ivan Oršanić, first led the State Secretariat for Propaganda in the NDH, then became the leader of the Ustaše Youth, reporting directly to Pavelić.

In 1937 Archbishop Stepinac founded the Committee for Refugee Assistance in Zagreb, which extensively helped the Jews fleeing from Nazi Germany. Terezija Skringar, the secretary of that Committee, would be apprehended by Gestapo immediately after the arrival of Wehrmacht forces in Zagreb in April 1940, and spent 5 months in German detention. Stepinac preached against racism in several sermons, starting from 1938. "To consider oneself as some higher beings - superhuman and despise another, when it is known that all men are in themselves dust and ashes, and by the mercy of God, all the children of one Heavenly Father", he preached in 1938. Stepinac considered Nazis as "pagans", and always held a reserved attitude in any contact with German representatives. The Gestapo in Zagreb reported that Stepinac held a clear antipathy against Nazism, and made numerous acts to help persecuted Jews in the 1941–1945 period.

In 1940, Stepinac told Prince Paul:

The most ideal thing would be for the Serbs to return to the faith of their fathers, that is, to bow the head before Christ's representative, the Holy Father. Then we could at last breathe in this part of Europe, for Byzantinism has played a frightful role in the history of this part of the world.

Of all the threats he perceived to the Croatian people and the Catholic Church, Stepinac railed most against the dangers of communism. In August 1940, in response to the recent establishment of diplomatic relations between Yugoslavia and the Soviet Union, Stepinac sermonised that there could be no co-operation between the Church and communists, stated that the Church was not afraid of communists, and that communists would make Croatia "a nation of killers and robbers, debauchees, and thieves".

Stepinac was particularly obsessed with Freemasonry, which was closely associated with support for the unification of Yugoslavia and opposed what it considered the Catholic Church's "authoritarianism and anti-liberal ideology." In 1934 Stepinac wrote in his diary: "In Yugoslavia, today, Freemasonry rules. Unfortunately, in the heart of the Croatian nation also, in Zagreb, this hellish society has entrenched itself, a lair of immorality, corruption, and all kinds of dishonesty, the sworn enemy of the Catholic Church and therefore also of the Croatian nation. Without the knowledge and approval of the Freemasons, nobody can be appointed to any influential position. It is no joke to join battle with it, but it must be done in the interests of the church, the Croatian people, and even the state of Yugoslavia if it wants to continue to exist, because the violence that rules today is supported by Freemasonry."

Tomasevich notes that such vehement sentiments against Freemasonry were not unusual among conservative senior churchmen prior to the Second Vatican Council. Tomasevich further observes that despite papal encyclicals against both Italian fascist abuses against Catholic Youth organizations in 1931 and German Nazism in 1937, Stepinac refrained from condemning or even mentioning Fascism or Nazism, pointing out that in 1938 the Catholic Church was supporting the Italian and German allies of Franco Spanish Civil War, and public criticism of their political ideologies would not have been helpful. Finally, Tomasevich stresses that the Vatican saw Germany as the most important opponent of communism. Nevertheless, Stepinac was a member of the Yugoslav Catholic Bishops' Conference that issued warnings against both Nazism and Communism after the 1937 papal encyclical against Nazis ideology. Stepinac feared both Nazism and communism, even as he disdained western parliamentary democracy. This can be seen from Stepinac's diary entry of 5 November 1940, when he wrote,

If Germany wins [the war], there will be appalling terror and the destruction of little nations. If England wins, the masons, [and] Jews will remain in power ... If the USSR wins, then the devil will have authority over both the world and hell.

West describes Stepinac as a "puritanical zealot", who gathered together those opposing communism, liberalism, secular education, divorce reform, profanity, sexual intercourse outside of marriage, and birth control, under the umbrella of the Croatian Catholic movement. Stepinac even railed against "mixed sunbathing and swimming". West also observes that by 1934, Stepinac had developed into an

ardent, almost obsessive, Croatian nationalist whose bigotry was softened only by his piety and a measure of human kindness.

According to the journalist Marcus Tanner, by the time he became coadjutor bishop, Stepinac had become a determined opponent of the Serb-centric approach of the Yugoslav government, and by the time he became archbishop he was a strong supporter of the HSS, making it clear that he had voted for Maček in the 1938 elections.

Stella Alexander wrote of Stepinac's political outlook:

He was in many ways a typical son of the Church in Croatia of that time, fervidly pious, narrow and dogmatic, believing, in his own words, that "Jews, freemasons and communists" were "the worst enemies of the Church", and that the Orthodox Serbs, the schismatics must whenever possible be brought back to the true Church. This was coupled not only with great courage, but with social concern and charity, especially when he was confronted with individual cases; he was a good pastor and felt close to his people. The impression he makes is also, unexpectedly, one of simplicity and personal modesty. He was conscious of the dignity and weight of his office but never of himself. His courage, which was always great, increased as the pressures on him grew heavier and in the end could be described as heroic; this and his devotion to duty made flight or even withdrawal from his diocese unthinkable. But his political short-sightedness limited his grasp of the apocalyptic events of 1941 to the immediate future of Croatia and the Catholic Church in Croatia, and this left him open to the charge of complicity in the terrible crimes of the ustaše. The same blinkered outlook kept him from establishing some kind of modus Vivendi with the new government immediately after the war.

== World War II ==
After the outbreak of war in September 1939, the Kingdom of Yugoslavia declared its neutrality, and the United Kingdom worked hard to help Yugoslavia maintain its stance. In the face of steadily mounting pressure from Germany and Italy, by March 1941 Yugoslavia had been completely surrounded by members of the Axis. In this situation, some senior government figures were advocating for Yugoslavia to also join the Tripartite Pact.

After a number of delays, Prince Paul and Prime Minister Cvetković signed the Pact on 25 March, but the following day there were demonstrations in Belgrade, with protesters chanting "Better the grave than a slave, better a war than the pact". In the early hours of 27 March a bloodless military coup d'état was executed. In the wake of the coup, the new government refused to ratify Yugoslavia's signing of the Tripartite Pact, but did not openly rule it out. The coup found little support with the Croatian population, and on the day after the invasion commenced Maček resigned from the government and returned to Zagreb in anticipation of unrest.

=== Invasion and establishment of the Independent State of Croatia ===
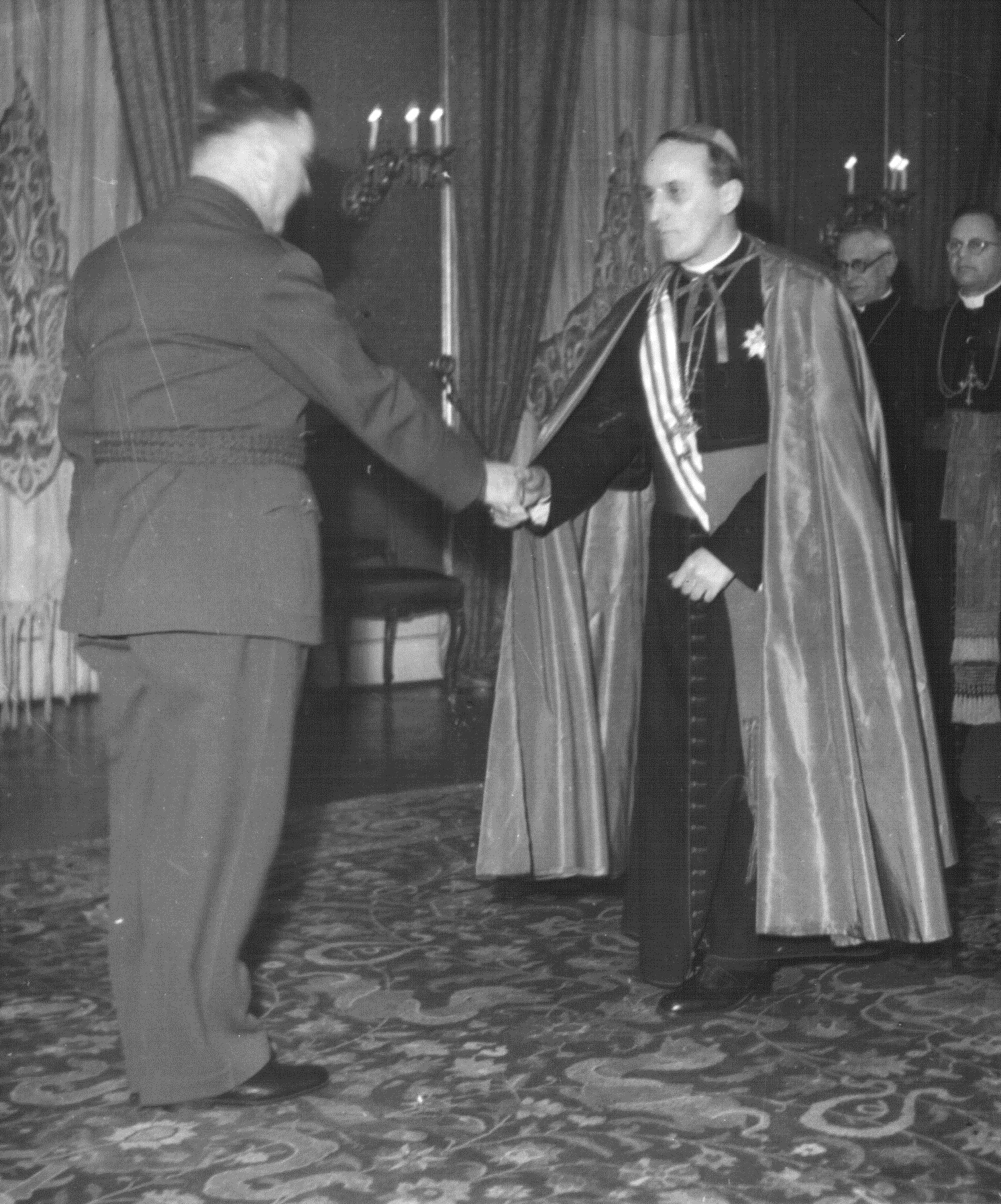
Archbishop Stepinac greeting the fascist Ustaše leader Ante Pavelić

Hitler was furious when he learned of the coup, and later on 27 March 1941 he ordered the invasion of Yugoslavia. Commencing on 6 April, a German-led Axis invasion force began its assault from multiple directions, quickly overcoming the limited resistance. During the fighting, several Croat units mutinied and others performed poorly or defected. On 10 April 1941, with the assistance of the Germans, the senior Ustaše figure in the country, Slavko Kvaternik, proclaimed the establishment of the Independent State of Croatia (Croatian: Nezavisna Država Hrvatska, NDH). German tanks entered Zagreb later that same day and were greeted by cheering crowds.

Before the war the Ustaše were a fascist, ultranationalist, racist and terrorist organization, fighting for an independent Croatia. Ustaše terrorists set off bombs on international trains bound for Yugoslavia, and were convicted in the 1934 assassination of the Yugoslav King and French foreign Minister in Marseille. Ante Pavelić, Kvaternik and other Ustaše leaders were sentenced to death in absentia by French courts, as the true assassination ringleaders. The Ustaše "17 Principles" proclaimed that those who were not "of Croat blood" (i.e. Serbs and Jews), will not have any political role in the future Croat state. In his 1936 tract, "The Croat Question", the Ustaše leader, Pavelić, spouted anti-Serb and anti-Semitic hatred, calling Jews the enemy of the Croat people.

On 12 April, Stepinac visited Kvaternik and pledged his loyalty to the NDH. The following day, when the Ustaše leader Ante Pavelić arrived in Zagreb, Stepinac did not participate in the welcome, but he did visit Pavelić on 16 April. These meetings and a radio broadcast all occurred prior to the capitulation of the Yugoslav armed forces on 17 April. That evening, Stepinac hosted a dinner party for Pavelić and the leading Ustaše. On 27 April, Stepinac recorded in his diary that Pavelić assured him he will act per the Catholic Church's desires, and that Pavelić stated he will "exterminate" the Old Catholic Church (which rejects Papal authority) and will not be tolerant of the Serbian Orthodox Church, because it was not the Church for him, but a political organization. Based on this Stepinac concluded in his diary that Pavelic is "a sincere Catholic and that the Church would enjoy freedom to carry out its work", although he recognised that difficulties lay ahead. On the same day, the official Croatian Catholic newspaper Nedelja praised both Pavelić and Hitler, saying:

God, who directs the destiny of nations and controls the hearts of kings, has given us Ante Pavelić and moved the leader of friendly and allied people, Adolf Hitler, to use his victorious troops to disperse our oppressors and enable us to create an Independent State of Croatia. Glory be to God, our gratitude to Adolf Hitler, and infinite loyalty to our Poglavnik, Ante Pavelić.

Immediately the Ustaše implemented draconian decrees specifying death as the sole penalty for those who attempt to act against the regime (April 17), opened the first concentration camp (April 15), and initiated the persecution of Jews and Serbs. Aware the Ustaše were preparing Nazi-style Race Laws, on April 23 Stepinac wrote Ustaše interior minister Andrija Artuković a letter, in which Stepinac calls the Race Laws "necessary", and only asks that Jewish converts to Catholicism be exempted. Five days later, on 28 April, Stepinac issued a "rapturous" encyclical to his diocese regarding the creation of the "young Croatian state", which included the words:

Our people has come face to face with its age-old and ardently desired dream. The times are such that it is no longer the tongue which speaks but the blood with its mysterious links with the country, in which we have seen the light of God, and with its people from whom we spring. Do we need to say that the blood flows more quickly in our veins, that the hearts in our breasts beat faster? ... It is easy to see God's hand at work here.

Stepinac urged the clergy of his archdiocese to fulfill their duty to the new Croatian state and pray that the head of state, i.e. the Ustashe leader Pavelić,

may have the spirit and wisdom in order to fulfill noble and responsible office for the glory of God and the salvation of the people in truth and justice.

Stepinac's letter captured what was a common sentiment among Croatian nationalists and much of the Catholic Church in the new state. Considering the marginal role of the Church in the political arena during the interwar period, the creation of the NDH appeared to offer the Church and the Croatian Catholic movement an opportunity. The leaders of the new state appeared willing to work with Church leaders, and thus reduce the marginalisation the Church had been subject to under the Yugoslav state.

Stepinac's immediate visits to Kvaternik and Pavelić, and his diocesan letter all assisted the Ustaše in consolidating their control of the new state, and enhanced its credibility with the Croatian people. Cornwell notes that this letter was issued on the same day that nearly 200 Serbs were massacred by the Ustaše near Bjelovar. Even prior to Stepinac's letter, Ustaše and Volksdeutche had already destroyed the Osijek synagogue (14 April), and on 17 April Pavelić had issued the Decree on the Protection of the Nation and the State, the first of the acts that placed Serbs, Jews and Roma outside the law, leading to their persecution and destruction. The Ustaše had opened and started filling their first concentration camp (15 April), and had instituted additional discriminatory edicts against Jews and Serbs (14, 19, 22 and 25 April). Stepinac already knew of the planned racial laws, which Pavelić signed only 2 days after Stepinac issued his letter praising Pavelić and the Ustaše state.

On 30 April 1941, Pavelić signed the main race laws - the Legal Decree on Racial Origins, and the Legal Decree on the Protection of Aryan Blood and the Honor of the Croatian People. In a letter to the Pope from May 16, Stepinac wrote that the race laws were meant to appease the Nazis, and concludes that "it was a much lesser evil that the Croats passed this law rather than that the Germans took all power into their own hands". In a May 14 letter to the Pope, when he knew of the slaughter of 260 Orthodox Serbs held in the Glina Church, Stepinac praised Ustaše efforts to turn Croatia into a "Catholic country", and praised Pavelić in particular, noting he will "liquidate" (eliminate) Orthodox Serbs from Croatia:

Completely honestly, I notice that in the circles of power there is the utmost desire to turn Croatia into a Catholic country. The Minister of War [Slavko Kvaternik] absolutely guaranteed me: either Croatia will be a Catholic country, or let it disappear…The desire of those who currently rule Croatia to implement the teachings of the Catholic Church obliges us to help and support them with all the loyalty and strength we have." Stepinac added: "Pavelić is a true Catholic practicing believer, and he wants to create, despite huge obstacles, a Catholic state in Croatia ... I believe that if the Poglavnik, Pavelić, were head of government for 20 years, the schismatics [i.e. Orthodox Serbs] would be completely liquidated (eliminated) from Croatia." Referencing Nazi plans to expel 260,000 Slovenes, Stepinac wrote: "Earlier [Pavelić] asked me what I thought if he decided to ask the German authorities to change the fate of Slovenes and transfer them as Catholics to Croatia, among Catholics, and transfer the same number of schismatic Serbs from Croatia to Macedonia. I replied to [Pavelić] that such a solution would be better for the unfortunate Slovenes"

Croatian historian, Hrvoje Klasić, notes Stepinac supported actions that today's courts would classify as ethnic cleansing of Serbs. In May 1941 Pavelić visited the Pope. Phayer writes that Stepinac arranged the audience with Pius XII, and "recommended the dictator to the Holy See". Ester Gitman writes that "Stepinac chose not to join Pavelić" and that he was given a private audience with the Pope. Pavelić put pressure on Archbishop Stepinac to write to Pope Pius XII, via Cardinal Maglione, to request official recognition of the Independent State of Croatia. The answer came back in July - in accordance with long-standing tradition during wartime, no Vatican recognition of the NDH was forthcoming. But the Pope did send Abbot Giuseppe Marcone as apostolic visitor, who acted as papal nuncio, which satisfied Stepinac, since he felt "the Vatican had de facto recognized the new state".

In May 16 report to the Pope, Stepinac wrote:

It is obvious for now, the pressure of the Germans, who are very much felt in the laws against Jews, although they claim that they do not want to interfere in the internal affairs of the Croatian State. Indeed, the racist law passed these days must be attributed to the severe pressures of Germany, because I know from personal encounters with people who run the state that they do not intend to keep the law in full force for long as it has been published. It is much less evil that the Croats passed this law than if the Germans had taken all power into their own hands.

Pavelić met Hitler for the first time on 7 June 1941, and told him that many younger clergy were supportive of the Ustaše regime, but mentioned that Stepinac had advised him that he could only rule if he was "as forebearing as possible". Biondich notes that Stepinac was unhappy that many younger priests were overtly supporting the Ustaše. On 26 June 1941, Stepinac met with the Archbishop of Vrhbosna and the bishops of Belgrade, Banja Luka, Split, Hvar, Šibenik and Senj-Modruš. The Bishop of Mostar sent a friar to the meeting. The group decided to go to Pavelić to express their devotion and trust. At the reception with Pavelić, Stepinac stated that "love of religion and country spring only from God", then promised Pavelić their loyalty and co-operation.

Despite initially welcoming the Independent State of Croatia, Stepinac subsequently condemned the Nazi-aligned state's atrocities against Jews and Serbs. He objected to the persecution of Jews and Nazi laws, helped Jews and others to escape and criticized Ustaše atrocities in front of Zagreb Cathedral in 1943. Despite this, Stepinac never broke with the Ustaše regime and continued to attend public gatherings at their side. After the invasion and Italian annexation of much of the Dalmatian coast, the ecclesiastical province of the Zagreb archbishopric included the Archdiocese of Zagreb, as well as the dioceses of Đakovo and Senj-Modruš, and the Greek Catholic Bishopric of Križevci. Stepinac had very limited formal authority over the suffragan bishops of his province, being more of a "first among equals" than a superior. Biondich states that Stepinac did not have the power to dictate policy or control the behaviour of the Sarajevo-based Archbishop of Vrhbosna, Ivan Šarić, or the other bishops in the NDH. Yet Goldstein notes that Stepinac communicated with Sarajevo Archbishop Ivan Šarić, but apparently never even privately condemned his public support for the Ustaše genocides, unlike the Croatian Peasant Party members in London who vehemently condemned Šarić.

By the end of Summer 1941, Ante Pavelić publicly blamed the irregular "Wild Ustashe" (some 25,000-30,000 of them, including many criminal elements) for all the atrocities performed by the Ustashe in the previous months. The state authorities never paid members of "Wild Ustashe", nor acknowledged them to be in the military service, though government-controlled press and Ustashe officials in former months clearly encouraged those aggressive but undisciplined groups to go against the "enemy elements", as the regime needed the manpower to execute ethnic cleansing and genocide within the NDH. Some members of that irregular part of the Ustashe Militia were arrested, tried and executed for the crimes against Serbs and Gypsies. This was done to convey a message to the rest of the "Wild Ustashe" to become part of the Ustashe hierarchy through regimentation. Persecution against Serbs, Jews and Roma persisted, however.

=== Relations with the government ===
The historian, Jozo Tomasevich, states that the NDH regime unleashed genocidal policies against Jews, Serbs and Roma, while also subjecting Croats to the greatest repression they experienced in their history. According to John Fine, Stepinac enjoyed close associations with the Ustaše leaders, as he was the archbishop of the capital. During the war Stepinac personally celebrated Te Deums on the anniversary of the founding of the NDH, including on April 10., 1945. Stepinac served as the military Vicar of the NDH army throughout the war. He appeared in photographs numerous times in Ustaše newspapers, alongside Pavelić and other Ustaše leaders. Although he later sought to distance himself from the Ustaše, especially when it became clear the Axis powers and the Ustaše would lose the war, Stepinac and the hierarchy of Catholic Church in Croatia nevertheless continued to publicly support the Ustaše regime until the very end.

In mid-May 1941, Maglione was already noting that Stepinac and other bishops were treading cautiously with the NDH authorities to avoid "compromising themselves" with the Ustaše leadership. In July 1941, no Te Deum was sung at the Zagreb Cathedral in celebration of Pavelić's birthday, which contributed to tension between Stepinac and the Ustaše leader. Yet that same month, at the end of the first NDH Bishop's conference, the bishops were received by Pavelić. Stepinac personally greeted Pavelić and stated that the bishops were visiting him "as the legitimate representatives of the Church of God in the NDH, with the promise of sincere and loyal cooperation for a better future of our homeland". In October 1941, shortly after the Ustaše destroyed the main synagogue in Zagreb, Stepinac preached a sermon in which he said,

"A House of God, of whatever religion, is a holy place. Whoever touches such a place will pay with his life. An attack on a House of God of any religion constitutes an attack on all religious communities." (Ivo Goldstein notes that claims that Stepinac said this come from a single individual, and are not confirmed by any other source, despite the fact Stepinac supposedly made the speech in the Zagreb cathedral. Goldstein also notes it's contrary to the rather gentler criticism of Ustaše race laws in well-documented, private-only communications at that time)

In November 1941, Stepinac chaired a bishop's conference, during which he heard reports from various bishops within the NDH. What he heard made his enthusiasm wane for the new Croatian state. On 20 November he wrote to Pavelić including some of the reports he had received. He stated that he believed that the worst of the atrocities were over, and that he believed they were the work of individuals. Yet contrary to Stepinac blaming individuals, historians state the Ustaše regime carried out systematic genocidal policies against Jews, Serbs and Roma. The letter did challenge Pavelić, stating that "no-one can deny that these terrible acts of violence and cruelty have been taking place", pointing out that Pavelić himself had condemned the atrocities committed by the Ustaše. He said, "The Croatian nation has been proud of its 1000-year-old culture and Christian tradition. That is why we wait for it to show in practice, now that it has achieved its freedom, a greater nobility and humanity than that displayed by its former rulers". Tomasevich notes that Stepinac never made this letter public, e.g. in the form of a pastoral letter, which could have had a beneficial effect on restraining Ustaše crimes. In fact Tomasevich writes that neither Stepinac, nor anyone else in the Church hierarchy ever uttered one word of public protest against Ustaše crimes against Serbs, by far the most numerous victims of NDH genocidal policies.

In December 1941, Pavelić met with the Italian foreign minister, Count Galeazzo Ciano, and told him that the lower levels of Catholic clergy displayed a very positive attitude towards the Ustaše regime, but that some of the bishops were openly hostile to the government. Also in December, Stepinac declared membership in Catholic Action and in the Ustaše to be incompatible. Cornwell states that Stepinac was "wholly in accord with the general goals of the new Croatian state". Tomasevich states that the Catholic Church fully supported Ustaše policies, and failed to publicly condemn crimes against Serbs. Many priests and well-known Catholic laymen openly sided with the Ustaše, assumed responsible positions in the NDH, while the Catholic press praised the Pavelić regime. On more than one occasion, the archbishop proclaimed his support for the Independent State of Croatia and welcomed the demise of Yugoslavia. On 10 April each year during the war he celebrated a mass to celebrate proclamation of the NDH. In June 1945 the Papal legate to the NDH, Marcone, related to a British officer in Zagreb that the Croatian Catholic Church during the war "tended to identify itself too closely with the Ustaše", because (1) many Croat priests were passionate believers in Croatia's independence, thus they were tempted to turn a blind eye on Ustaše atrocities, and (2) they were drawn to leading Ustaše because they were devout Catholics, including the worst criminals like Pavelić, Rukavina and Luburić.

In May, 1943, Stepinac sent a report to the Papal secretary of state, on the attitude of the Catholic Church in Croatia towards the Ustaše regime. Responding to criticisms that the Church had not done enough to oppose Ustaše crimes, Stepinac enumerated the main benefits the Church received from the Ustaše regime: it fights abortion, which Stepinac claimed is mainly performed by Jewish and Serb doctors, and has banned pornography, according to Stepinac, published by Jews and Serbs; that it abolished Freemasonry and vigorously fought against communism, that it issued decrees against swearing. The Ustaše government ensured the Christian education of NDH soldiers; insisted on religious education in schools; that it increased financial aid to Catholic religious institutions, increased the salaries of the clergy, supported the Church's charitable activities, financially supported the construction of new and the repair of existing churches. According to Stepinac, all these were indicators of the Ustaše regime's goodwill towards the Catholic Church, and "as the Archbishop's report makes clear, the Church reciprocated in kind."

In the same letter Stepinac described Yugoslav government-in-exile complaints against the Ustaše regime as "enemy propaganda" aimed at bringing the NDH into disrepute in the eyes of the Vatican. He admitted that atrocities had been committed against Serbs by irresponsible people without the sanction of the NDH authorities, and claimed that many of those responsible had been executed by the government. He deplored and condemned the atrocities, but stated that they were a reaction to Serb behavior during the interwar period during which, he claimed, Serbs had violated all the rights of the Croatian people. He also reminded the Cardinal of the assassination of the Croatian deputies in the Parliament in 1928. Tomasevich notes the Ustaše also sought to justify, what they regularly referred to as "some excesses" by individual Ustaše and "wild Ustaše", by invoking prewar repressive acts by the Serb-dominated Yugoslav regime. However, contrary to Stepinac's views, Tomasevich writes that "the wartime Ustaše policies against the Serbs were of a genocidal nature and totally out of proportion to earlier [Serb] anti-Croatian measures, both in nature and extent". Furthermore, the Ustaše regime also carried genocides against Jews and Roma, in NDH state-run concentration camps.

Pavelić attended services at Zagreb Cathedral only once in the four years he was in power, and Stepinac did not greet him at the entrance on that occasion. Stepinac lost control of the Archdiocese's publication Katolički List under the new regime. In 1942, officials from Hungary lobbied to ecclesiastically attach Hungarian-occupied Međimurje to a diocese in Hungary. Stepinac opposed this and received guarantees from the Holy See that diocesan boundaries would not change during the war. On 26 October 1943, the Germans killed the archbishop's brother Mijo.

According to Tanner, Stepinac remained naive about politics and the nature of the Ustaše regime. In 1943, Stepinac travelled to the Vatican and came into contact with the Croatian artist Ivan Meštrović. According to Meštrović, Stepinac asked him whether he thought Pavelić knew about the killings of Serbs. When Meštrović replied that Pavelić must know everything, Stepinac went pale and burst into tears.

The historian Martin Gilbert wrote that despite initially welcoming the Independent State of Croatia, Stepinac later "condemned Croat atrocities against both Serbs and Jews, and himself saved a group of Jews in an old age home". According to West, Stepinac and the entire Catholic Church remained loyal to Pavelić and the NDH. West states that Stepinac was one of the priests and father-confessors to senior Ustaše such as Pavelić, Budak, Kvaternik and Artuković.

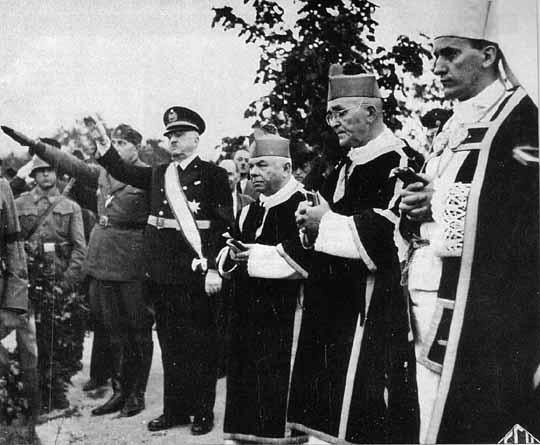
Stepinac (far right) with two Catholic priests at the funeral of President of the Croatian Parliament Marko Došen in September 1944

In 1944, the NDH Ministry for Justice and Religion proposed, and Stepinac accepted the Order of Merit medal from Pavelić, for "having as archbishop unmasked inside and outside the country the opponents of the Independent State of Croatia"

The Catholic Church in the NDH then began to criticise actions taken by the government, and attempted to distance itself to some extent from the authorities. It had no real alternative, given that the likely alternate governments were led by Serb-chauvinist Chetniks or communists. By that time the Ustaše had long lost the support of the great majority of the Croatian people, and most members of the main Croatian prewar party, the Croatian Peasant Party, were supporting the Partisans. Contrary to this, the Church maintained its support of the NDH government to the bitter end. This is demonstrated by the pastoral letter issued after the episcopal conference of 24 March 1945, in which the Croatian Catholic Church maintained its formal support for the puppet state and its rulers, despite the fact that most senior regime figures were preparing to flee the country. The Episcopal Conference was convened at the urging of the Ustaše government, who also had a hand in drafting the letter, issued after the formation of the new, unified Yugoslav government, which had already been recognized by the Allies. According to a later British representative in Zagreb, the papal legate Marcone stated that if he had known of the Bishops' letter of support for the NDH, he would have done everything to prevent its publication (during the war the Vatican recognized the Yugoslav government in exile, and postwar recognized the new Yugoslav government). The Catholic press in the NDH also maintained its support of Pavelić right to the end.

Ivo Goldstein notes Stepinac's protests against Ustaše crimes, yet states that Stepinac's biggest failure was his public support for the criminal NDH, from its first dayt to its last - he celebrated the coming of the Ustaše to power, held Te Deums on the anniversaries of the NDH (even on April 10, 1945), on numerous occasions he was photographed with Pavelić and other Ustaše officials, all of which provided legitimacy to Ustaše regime, allowing it to maintain power and commit crimes. The Ustaše ignored Stepinac's private criticisms, while only a relatively small number of people heard his few public criticisms. On the other hand, countless people saw and read about Stepinac's public support for the NDH. Furthermore, Stepinac expressed much of his criticisms only after the Ustaše had already committed most of their genocidal crimes.

Biondich concludes that claims that Stepinac was an Ustaše sympathiser, and even the spiritual leader of the regime are unfounded. He further states that while Stepinac supported independence, he "began privately to distance himself from the regime within weeks, and certainly within months of the Croatian state's formation." He also observes that while Stepinac continued to attend to his ceremonial duties at official state events, he was privately raising his concerns with the Ustaše leaders. However Biondich also states that Stepinac was not the outspoken critic of the Ustaše regime that many of his defenders claim.

On the other hand, historian Robert McCormick states, "for all the Archbishop's hand wringing, he continued to be a tacit participant in the Independent State of Croatia (ISC). He repeatedly appeared in public with the Poglavnik (the Ustaše leader Ante Pavelić), and issued Te Deum's on the anniversary of the NDH's creation. His failure to publicly denounce the Ustaše's atrocities in the name of the NDH, was tantamount to accepting Pavelić's policies".

On 10 April 1945, Stepinac held a mass in the Zagreb Cathedral for the 4th anniversary of the NDH's founding, and Te Deum's were sung for what was left of the Ustaše state. Richard West writes that, on 15 April, as Pavelić and other Ustaše leaders were getting ready to flee, "Archbishop Stepinac devoted his sermon to what he believed was Croatia's worst sin, not mass murder, but swearing."

=== Response to Ustaše atrocities ===
==== Racial laws ====
On 23 April 1941, Stepinac wrote to the Ustaše Interior Minister, Artuković, "on the occasion of the announced passage of anti-Jewish laws", to caution of "good Catholics who are of the Jewish race and who have converted from the Jewish religion ... I consider that it would be necessary, in passing the necessary laws, to take converts of this kind into account." Historian Ivo Goldstein notes that Stepinac not only did not protest against the adoption of racial laws, he called them "necessary", and only asked that Jewish converts to Catholicism be exempted. Following Pavelić's proclamation of the Race Laws, Stepinac praised Pavelić to the Pope, as "a true Catholic practicing believer", and stated that "it was a much lesser evil that the Croats passed this law rather than that the Germans took all power into their own hands".

Stepinac again wrote to Artuković on 22 May to protest the race laws and their application to converted Jews, telling him that members of other races should not be discriminated against "through no fault of their own." He wrote, "We ... appeal to you to issue regulations so that even in the framework of antisemitic legislation, and similar legislation concerning Serbs, the principles of human dignity be preserved." Stepinac added: "Everyone will certainly approve the attempt for the economy to be in national hands, not to allow a non-national and anti-national element to amass capital, or foreign elements to decide about the State and the people. But to take away any possibility of existence from members of other peoples or other races, and to brand them with the stamp of shame, this is an issue of humanity and a question of morality".

As Goldstein notes, Stepinac seemingly argued for "humane" race laws. On 24 May 1942, Stepinac condemned racial persecution in general terms, although he did not mention Serbs. He stated in a diocesan letter:

All men and all races are children of God; all without distinction. Those who are Gypsies, Black, European, or Aryan all have the same rights ... for this reason, the Catholic Church had always condemned, and continues to condemn, all injustice and all violence committed in the name of theories of class, race, or nationality. It is not permissible to persecute Gypsies or Jews because they are thought to be an inferior race.

In a sermon on 25 October 1942, he further commented on racial acceptance:

We affirm then that all peoples and races descend from God. In fact, there exists but one race ... The members of this race can be white or black, they can be separated by oceans or live on the opposing poles, [but] they remain first and foremost the race created by God, according to the precepts of natural law and positive Divine law as it is written in the hearts and minds of humans or revealed by Jesus Christ, the son of God, the sovereign of all peoples.

In response to criticisms by the Yugoslav government in exile, that the Church had not done enough to counter Ustaše crimes, in May 1943 Stepinac wrote a letter to the Papal secretary in which he acknowledged the crimes, yet praised the Ustaše, among other reasons, for fighting abortion and pornography, with Stepinac blaming Jews and Serbs for both.

In his homily of 31 October 1943, which some claim is his most resolute critique of the Ustaše, Stepinac first inveighed against abortion, the "pagan fashions of today's female world" and "all the licentiousness ... that has been observed ... at sea beaches and other bathing spots". He blames these "sins" for the fact that "God like thunder today brings down not just cities and villages, but entire peoples". The speech's primary theme is the defense of the Church's actions, against those who "accuse us of not having arisen in timely or appropriate fashion against the crimes in parts of our homeland". Stepinac states that "the Church cannot force others to behave according to God's laws" and cannot be responsible for "the hotheads in its own priestly ranks". He proclaims it was not the Church that "created in the souls of people the dissatisfaction and insatiability which has produced such sad consequences", instead he blames "certain circles, organizations, and members of other national groups", which some sources state is a reference to Serbs and perhaps Jews.

Stepinac then criticizes Communism, its denial of private property rights, its approval of divorce, negation of God, refusal to allow religious education in schools, etc. Finally at the end of the homily he states: "The Catholic Church does not know races that lord over others, or slave races. The Catholic Church knows only races and peoples as the creatures of God, and if it values some more, it is those of noble heart, and not of stronger fist. For her, a king in the royal palace is a man, in the same way as the last pauper and gypsy under a tent ... The system of shooting hundreds of hostages for a crime in which no culprit can be found is a pagan system that never yielded a good fruit".

In this speech Stepinac condemns "all the wrongdoing, all the killing of the innocent, all the burning of villages". Much of his public criticism was spoken after most of the genocides were already completed, and it became clear the Nazis and Ustaše would lose. These belated speeches were made before limited audiences, unlike his pastoral letter, condemning the Communists, that he ordered read from all the pulpits across Croatia, only 4 months after the Communists seized power. In a letter to the Vatican of May 1943, Stepinac still praised the Ustaše for the "good things" they had done, including the "strict ban on all pornographic publications, which were first and foremost published by Jews and Orthodox!".

Stepinac was involved directly and indirectly in efforts to save Jews from persecution. Amiel Shomrony (Emil Schwartz), was the personal secretary of Miroslav Šalom Freiberger (the chief rabbi in Zagreb) until 1942. In the actions for saving Jews, Shomrony acted as the mediator between the chief rabbi and Stepinac. He later stated that he considered Stepinac "truly blessed" since he did the best he could for the Jews during the war. Allegedly the Ustaša government at this point agitated at the Holy See for him to be removed from the position of archbishop of Zagreb, this however was refused due to the fact that the Vatican did not recognize the Ustaše state (despite Italian pressure).

Stepinac and the papal nuncio to Belgrade mediated with Royal Italian, Hungarian and Bulgarian troops, urging that the Yugoslav Jews be allowed to take refuge in the occupied Balkan territories to avoid deportation. He also arranged for Jews to travel via these territories to the safe, neutral states of Turkey and Spain, along with Istanbul-based nuncio Angelo Roncalli. He sent some Jews for safety to Rev Dragutin Jeish, who was killed during the war by the Ustaše on suspicion of supporting the Partisans.

==== Mass killings and concentration camps ====
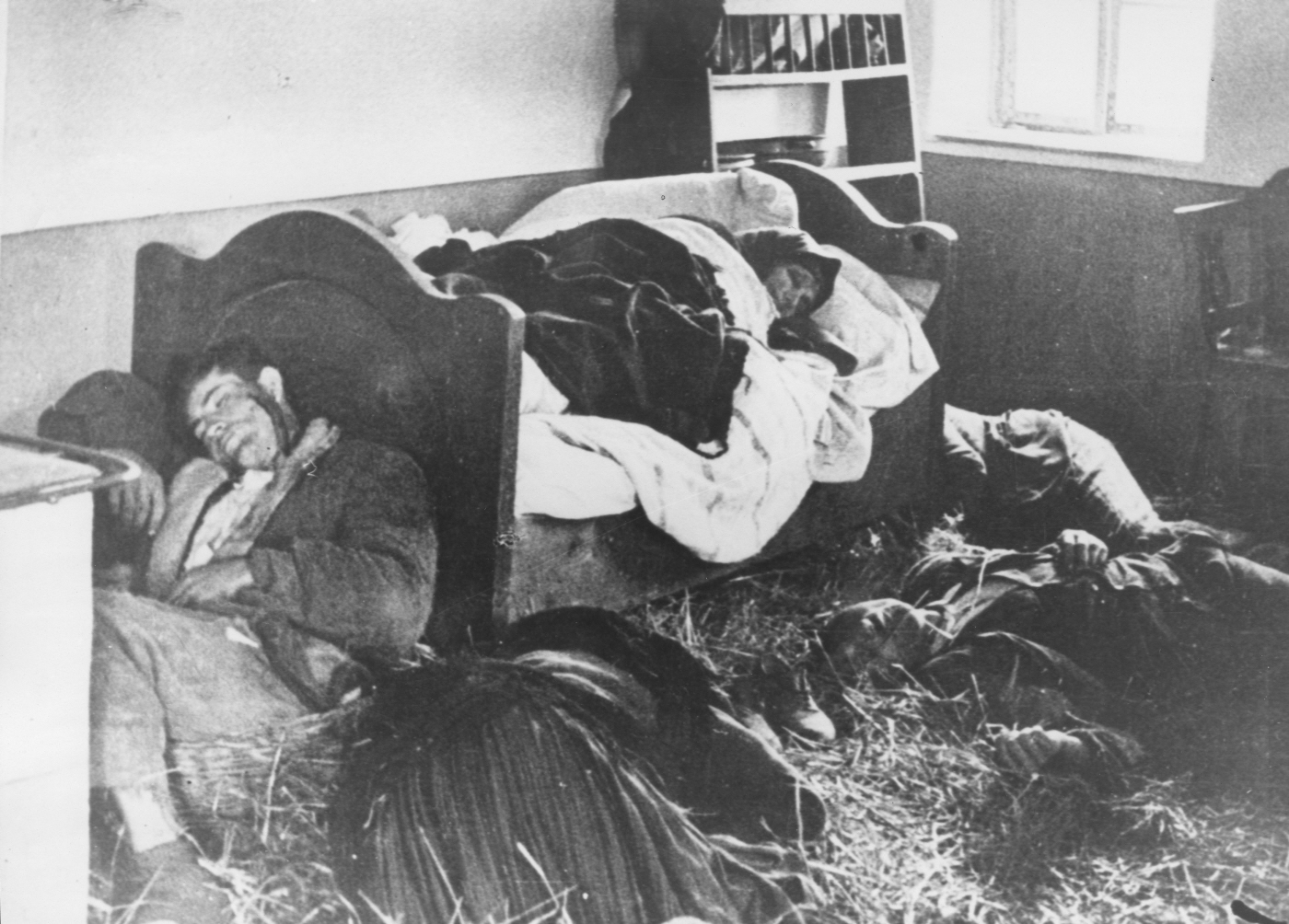
A Serb family massacred in their home by the Ustaše in 1941

The Ustaše unleashed a reign of terror in which 80% of the Jews (30,000 victims) in the NDH were killed, as well as practically all the Roma (25,000 victims), and almost 20% of the Serb population (340,000 victims – see: Number of victims). As a military vicar, Stepinac dispensed blessings to the Ustaše armies. Stepinac initially responded to these mass killings with private letters of protest. Thus, on 14 May 1941, Stepinac received word of an Ustaše massacre of Serb villagers at Glina. On the same day, he wrote to Pavelić saying:

Just now I received news that the Ustaše in Glina executed without trial and investigation 260 Serbs. I know that the Serbs committed some major crimes in our homeland in these last twenty years. But I consider it my bishop's responsibility to raise my voice and to say that this is not permitted according to Catholic teaching, which is why I ask that you undertake the most urgent measures on the entire territory of the Independent State of Croatia, so that not a single Serb is killed unless it is shown that he committed a crime warranting death. Otherwise, we will not be able to count on the blessing of heaven, without which we must perish.

According to Biondich, in the first weeks or even months after the establishment of the NDH, Stepinac may have not known that the atrocities perpetrated by the Ustaše were a key component of their plan. This view supposes that Stepinac considered the atrocities were either spontaneous or the result of so-called "irresponsible elements" who would be held to account by the authorities. His correspondence with Pavelić tends to suggest he did not believe that the Poglavnik would have sanctioned such actions. Although Stepinac was firmly opposed to the idea of Ustaše to establish a concentration camp within the borders of the Đakovo Bishop's domain, the Đakovo concentration camp was established in the deserted flour mill owned by the Diocese of Đakovo on 1 December 1941.

After the release of left-wing activist Ante Ciliga from Jasenovac in January 1943, Stepinac requested a meeting with him to learn about what was occurring at the camp. After seven Slovene priests were killed at Jasenovac, Stepinac wrote to Pavelić on 24 February 1943, saying:

This is a shameful blot and crime which cries to heaven for revenge, as the whole Jasenovac camp is a shameful fault for the Independent State of Croatia ... the entire public, and especially the relatives of the killed priests, ask for compensation and satisfaction and ask that the killers, who are the greatest misfortune for Croatia, be brought before a court of justice.

These were still private protest letters. Although later in 1942 and 1943, Stepinac started to speak out more openly against the Ustaše genocides, this was after most of the genocides were already committed, and it became increasingly clear the Nazis and Ustaše will be defeated. Additionally, Stepinac never publicly condemned the numerically greatest Ustaše genocide, that against the Serbs, and Stepinac continued to support until the very end the Ustaše state that had committed these crimes. Addressing defenders of Stepinac's more private approach, Ivo Goldstein notes that "relatively more persecuted Jews were saved when high church dignitaries openly, energetically and in a principled manner opposed this persecution – as in France (especially the Archbishops of Toulouse and Lyon), the Netherlands, Italy and Denmark, and for a time even in Germany itself. Catholic bishops in Slovakia strongly opposed Nazi demands for radical deportations and thus saved the lives of many converted Jews, and the Orthodox Metropolitan Stefan in Sofia, by tireless public defense of Jewish lives, played a fundamental role in preventing even one Jew from being deported to the Nazi camps from Bulgaria."

On the other hand Esther Gitman cites the desire to save lives as Stepinac's desideratum, noting that "the vigorous efforts to defend Jews by the Catholic hierarchy in the Netherlands were followed in 1942 by a roundup of all Jews, even longtime converts that included priests and nuns." Famously Saint Edith Stein. "The Dutch bishops demonstrated great courage, but 79 percent of the country’s Jews— 110,000 individuals—were murdered."

==== Deportations ====
Stepinac again wrote to Pavelić on 21 July 1941 in the wake of mass deportations of Jews and Serbs to concentration camps, stating he was sure that Pavelić was not aware of the atrocities, and that others might not be willing to tell him about them. He wrote that this situation meant there was an even greater obligation on Stepinac to bring them to Pavelić's attention. Referring to Jews as "non-Aryans", Stepinac wrote: "I hear from many quarters that non-Aryans are being treated inhumanely and cruelly during deportations to concentration camps, and in the camps themselves; moreover, that children, the elderly and the sick are not exempt from such treatment." Initially, Stepinac did not oppose these deportations of Jews and others to concentration camps as a matter of principle, but pleaded they be carried out "humanely", by proposing to Pavelić, on 21 July 1941, the introduction of "some particulars to mitigate the procedure: a) for people to be sent to camp in such a way to allow them to prepare what would be the most essential, to allow them to arrange their most urgent obligations both to their families and their jobs; b) for transport not to be in crowded sealed railway cars, especially to distant places; c) to give internees enough food; d) to provide those who are ill with medical treatment; e) to allow the most necessary food to be sent to them, and enable them to correspond with their families." Having heard that some of the deportees were recent converts to Catholicism, he had a duty to show greater concern regarding them. He asked that "humane and Christian consideration ... be shown especially to weak old people, young and innocent children, and the sick." According to Biondich, it is highly likely that Stepinac shared these concerns with the Vatican. On the other hand, Phayer writes, "it is impossible to believe that Stepinac and the Vatican did not know that the Ustasha murders amounted to genocide", given the "repression and terrorism of the Ustasha regime were without parallel in the history of Southeastern Europe". Stepinac clearly knew of the May 1941 Glina massacre, and early on that the Ustaše state was sending Jews, Serbs and others to concentration camps.

When deportation of Croatian Jews began, Stepinac and the papal envoy Giuseppe Marcone protested to Andrija Artukovic. Pope Pius XII had dispatched Marcone as Apostolic Visitor to Croatia, reportedly in order to assist Stepinac and the Croatian Episcopate in "combating the evil influence of neo-pagan propaganda which could be exercised in the organization of the new state". Marcone served as Nuncio in all but name. Mancone reported to Rome on the deteriorating conditions for Croatian Jews, made representations on behalf of the Jews to Croatian officials, and transported Jewish children to safety in neutral Turkey.

==== Forced conversions ====
In a circular letter to his clergy, Stepinac initially insisted that conversion had to be done freely, and only after religious instruction. While this and subsequent regulations were designed to protect "the church hierarchy against charges of promoting forced conversions", they also indicated "the church was willing to cooperate with regime's forced conversions, provided the canonical rules were followed". On 3 December 1941, Stepinac sent the pope a report, wherein he notes "the best prospects exist for the conversions".

However, the church's instructions were ignored by the Ustaše authorities. The authorities not only conducted forcible conversions, but on occasion they used the prospect of conversion as a means to gather Serbs together so they could kill them, which is what occurred at Glina. Some Serbs demanded that the local Catholic clergy convert them in order to save their lives. Later Stepinac advised individual priests to admit Orthodox believers to the Catholic Church if their lives were in danger, such that this conversion had no validity, allowing them to return to their faith once the danger passed.

On 18 May 1943, Stepinac wrote a letter to the pope, in which he estimated 240.000 conversions to date (despite some disputes Tomasevich states this letter is authentic). The Catholic Church in Croatia has also had to contend with criticism of what some have seen as a passive stance towards the Ustaša policy of religious conversion whereby some Serbs – but not the intelligentsia element – were able to escape other persecution by adopting the Catholic faith. According to Cornwell, through his role in the forced conversions, Stepinac displayed a "moral dislocation" that "endorsed a contempt for religious freedom tantamount to complicity with the violence".

While Stepinac did suspend a number of priests, including Ivo Guberina and Zvonko Brekalo, he only had the authority to do so within his own diocese; he had no power to suspend other priests or bishops outside of Zagreb, as that power was reserved for the Vatican. Due to the arbitrary nature of justice in the NDH and the absence of proper systems for complaint and redress, people such as Stepinac developed an approach of intervening personally with senior government figures on behalf of victims.

===== Other crimes against the Serbian Orthodox Church =====
In addition to forced conversions, Tomasevich describes other elements of the "Ustaše massive attack against the Serbian Orthodox Church". The Ustaše killed 157 Orthodox priests, among them 3 Serb Orthodox bishops (cutting the throat of the bishop of Banja Luka and killing the archbishop of Sarajevo), while they jailed and tortured the Orthodox archbishop of Zagreb, Dositej Vasić. The Ustaše expelled to Serbia 327 Orthodox priests and one bishop, while 2 other bishops and 12 priests left on their own. Thus 85% of the Orthodox priests in the Independent State of Croatia were either killed or expelled by the Ustaše, in order to "leave the Orthodox population without spiritual leadership so the Ustašas' policy of forced or fear-induced conversions to Catholicism would be easier to carry out".

The Ustaše destroyed and desecrated numerous Orthodox Churches, forbade the Cyrillic script and Julian calendar (both used in the Orthodox Church), even prohibited the term "Serbian Orthodox Church". Orthodox schools were shut down, and the Church was prohibited from collecting contributions from believers, robbing it of income. Orthodox Church properties were confiscated by the Ustaše, some turned over to the Croatian Catholic Church. Finally, to destroy the Serbian Orthodox Church, the Ustaše tried to create its own, alternative Croatian Orthodox Church, with an imported Russian priest. but failed to gain adherents.

Tomasevich states that this massive Ustaše attack on the Serbian Orthodox Church "was approved and supported by many Croatian Catholic priests", and that the Croatian Roman Catholic Church hierarchy and the Vatican "regarded Ustaše policies against the Serbs and Serbian Orthodox Church as advantageous to Roman Catholicism".

==== Overall assessments of Stepinac's actions during WWII ====
Tomasevich assesses Stepinac's wartime words and deeds in three categories: (1) Private actions to help certain individuals and groups, where he states Stepinac "deserves highest praise, although his actions were not always successful", (2) Proclamations of general human rights, expressed in his sermons at first "occasionally and mildly", but more strongly after 1943 (after the Ustashe had already perpetrated most of the genocides, and it was clear the Nazis and Ustashe would be defeated), also deserve praise, and (3) Statements dealing with overall Church policy toward the wartime Croatian state. Here Tomasevich states "there are serious shortcomings in Stepinac's statements and actions toward the Ustashe regime and its genocidal actions against the Serbs and the Serbian Orthodox Church".

Thus, despite the Ustashe genocide against the Serbs, the ethnic cleansing and forced conversions, the killings and expulsions of most Orthodox priests, the destruction and desecration of many Orthodox Churches, "neither Archbishop Stepinac, nor any other Catholic bishop in the state ... uttered one word of public protest" against these crimes. "This was not a mere oversight. It was a deliberate policy" as stated by the papal legate Abbot Marcone, when he wrote in 1943 that given the fact that most guerrillas were "schismatics" (i.e. Eastern-Orthodox Serbs) "our Croatian episcopate does not have any special motive to protest publicly against the government in favor of the schismatics". In Stepinac's case this was compounded by his "dim view of Orthodoxy and thought that an unbridgeable gulf existed between Croats and Serbs". Additionally, given both Stepinac's and the Vatican's desire to see a Catholic state in Croatia and have a legate there, "the Church had to refrain from publicly criticizing the government's policies".

Tomasevich concludes "the policy of the Croatian Catholic Church hierarchy and the Vatican of not publicly condemning the Ustasha regime's actions during the war will probably remain controversial. From the standpoint of humanity, justice and common decency, it cannot be defended. But Stepinac was not the only one responsible for it, the Vatican was too".

Stella Alexander, author of The Triple Myth, a sympathetic biography of Stepinac, writes about him that

Two things stand out. He feared Communism above all (especially above fascism); and he found it hard to grasp that anything beyond the boundaries of Croatia, always excepting the Holy See, was quite real. ... He lived in the midst of apocalyptic events, bearing responsibilities which he had not sought. ... In the end one is left feeling that he was not quite great enough for his role. Given his limitations he behaved very well, certainly much better than most of his own people, and he grew in spiritual stature during the course of his long ordeal.

In another article, Stella Alexander writes the following:

From May 1942 he attacked the actions of the [ustaše] government in sermon after sermon, not only the forcible conversions but the anti-semitism and anti-Serbianism of the regime, the taking and shooting of hostages and the forcible breaking-up of Jewish-Gentile marriages, and he wrote bitterly to Pavelić about the conditions in the concentration camps, particularly the one at Jasenovac. He made repeated private interventions in individual cases, he refused to allow converted Jews to wear the yellow star in church, and he forbad military chaplains to administer the ustaSa oath if a crossed dagger and revolver were lying in front of the crucifix. Eventually he arranged for about 7,000 children, who were either orphans or had lost their families, to be accepted into Catholic homes, but forbad the clergy to baptize them into the Catholic Church. The ustaša authorities were furious with him, Pavelić detested him and according to Fr Masucci, secretary of the Vatican representative in Zagreb, asked the Vatican on three occasions to withdraw him. His friend Ivan Meštrović the sculptor, who met him in Rome during one of Stepinac's visits to the Vatican, wrote later in his memoirs that Stepinac told him that he expected to be killed either by the ustaSe or the communists.

Mark Biondich stated that Stepinac was not an "ardent supporter" of the Ustaše regime legitimating their every policy, but neither was he an "avowed opponent" publicly denouncing their crimes in a systematic manner, that many of his defenders claim.

== Post-war period ==
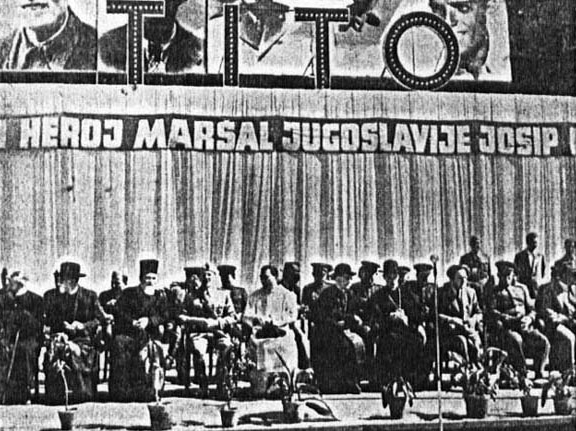
Stepinac at a post-war communist rally in September 1945. From left: three dignitaries of the Orthodox Church, the Partisan General Commanding of Zagreb, the Secretary to the Apostolic Visitor, Auxiliary Bishop Dr. Josip Lach, Archbishop Stepinac, People's Premier of Croatia Dr. Vladimir Bakaric, Soviet Military Attache, Minister of the Interior Dr. Hebrang.

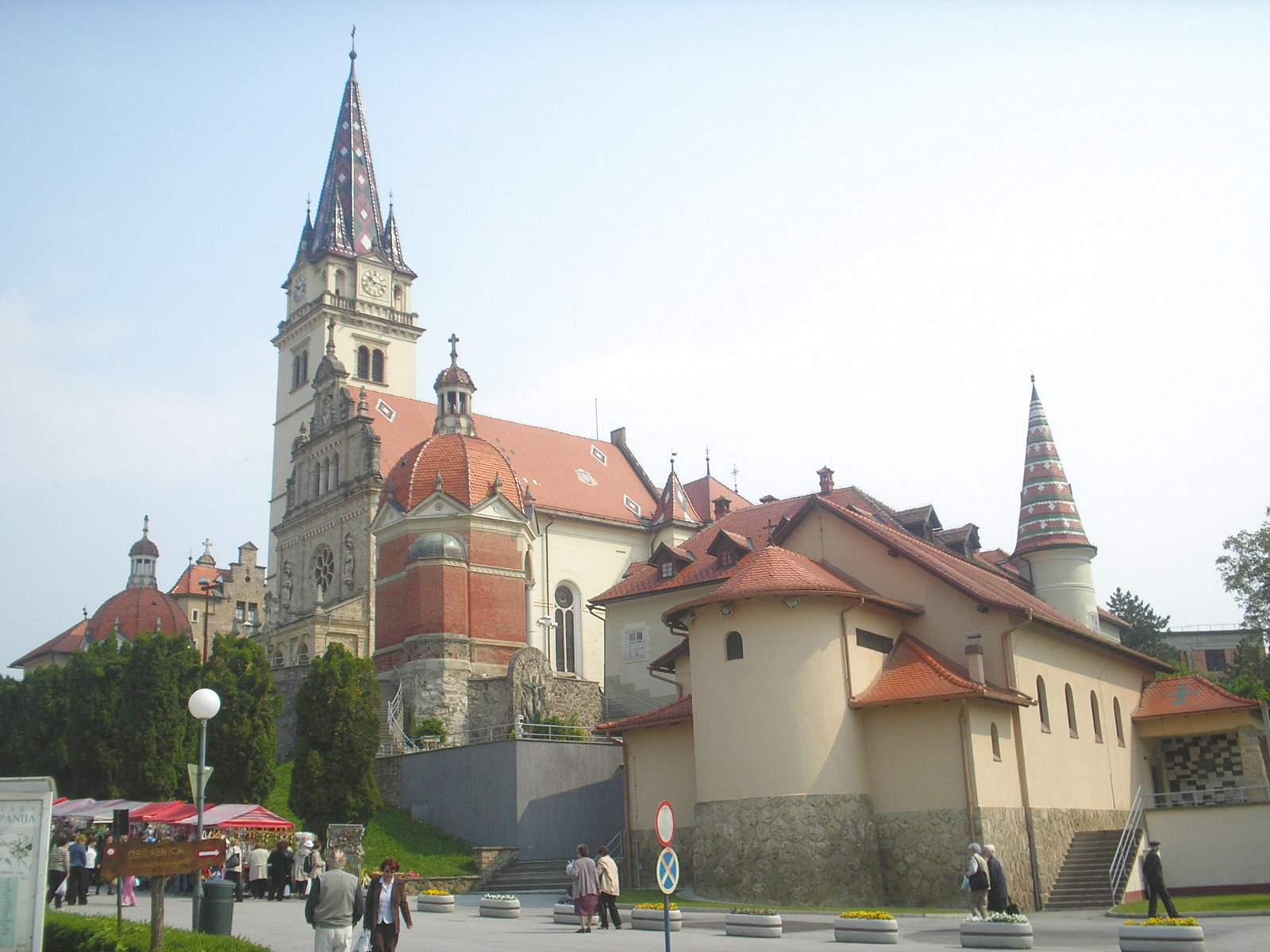
Our Lady of Marija Bistrica, where Pope John Paul II beatified Stepinac before 500,000 Croatians

The Allies recognized the new Tito–Šubašić Yugoslav government in 1944. In February 1945 the Zagreb Archdiocese newspaper reported that Stepinac and other Church dignitaries attended a congratulatory New Year's reception at Pavelić's, which included members of the Allied German Armed Forces, led by Generalfeldmarschall Maximilian von Weichs. On March 24, 1945, as the Partisans fought their final pitched battles against retreating German, NDH and other collaborationist forces, Stepinac and the Croatian bishops, at the behest of the Ustaše regime, issued a pastoral letter asking Croats to remain loyal to the NDH, and stand firm against the advancing Partisans. On April 10, 1945, Stepinac celebrated his last Te Deum for the NDH, which still had Race Laws, and was just then killing the last remaining 3,500 inmates, including 700-800 Jews, at the Jasenovac concentration camp. In the final days of the war Stepinac received and hid the archives of the Ustaše Ministry of Foreign Affairs, which later proved to contain gold stolen from concentration camp inmates.

Shortly after the fall of the NDH and during the surrender at Bleiburg, on 17 May 1945, Stepinac was effectively put under house arrest in Zagreb and was for the subsequent two weeks interviewed by Yugoslavia′s security, military judicial, and Communist party officials such as Veljko Drakulić, Vladimir Ranogajec, Antun Biber Tehek, whose aim was apparently to sound out his political stances with a view to finding a mode of political co-existence under the new regime.

On 2 June, Yugoslav leader Josip Broz Tito met with representatives of the Archdiocese of Zagreb, during which he advocated the idea that "the Catholic Church could do more for the people if it was independent of the Vatican" and more "national", like the Serbian Orthodox Church. The following day, Archbishop Stepinac was released from custody. One day later, Stepinac met with Tito, during which Tito's prime goal was to promote the idea of an autonomous Catholic Church for Yugoslavia with its own primate. This was consistent with the policy of the Yugoslav government in the immediate post-war period. The meeting with Tito, Vladimir Bakarić in attendance, on 4 June 1945 was written up in detail by Stepinac, both as a personal memo and as a report to Pope Pius XII.

On 22 June, the bishops of Croatia released a public letter accusing the Yugoslav authorities of injustices and crimes towards them. On 28 June, Stepinac wrote a letter to the government of Croatia asking for an end to the prosecution of Nazi collaborationists (collaboration having been widespread in occupied Yugoslavia) and prosecutions were being used by some as a pretext to settle old scores. On 10 July, Stepinac's secretary, Stjepan Lacković, traveled to Rome. While he was there, the Yugoslav authorities forbade him to return. Lacković went instead to the United States.

In August, a new land reform law was introduced which legalized the confiscation of 85 percent of church holdings in Yugoslavia. During the same period the archbishop almost certainly had ties with the post-war Ustaše guerrillas, the "Crusaders", and actively worked against the state. After fleeing with Pavelić, Erih Lisak, the last Ustaše chief of police, secretly returned to Croatia in September 1945, to organize remaining Ustaše forces hiding in forests, and he established contact with Stepinac's office and Stepinac himself. Ante Moškov, a former Ustaše general, also contacted Stepinac, and the police discovered Ustaše files and gold hidden in the archbishopric cellars. Stepinac urged Tito to meet with representatives of the Croatian Peasant party and even the Ustaše to help heal the wounds of war.

In September 1945, a synod of the Bishops' Conference of Yugoslavia was held in Zagreb which discussed the confrontation with the government. On 20. September, Stepinac published a pastoral letter in which he stated that "273 clergymen had been killed" since the Partisan take-over, "169 had been imprisoned", and another "89 were missing and presumed dead". The bishops also criticized the virtual suppression of the Catholic press, the fact that religious education was restricted, the confiscation of the majority of church lands, and the confiscation of seminaries. They condemned all ideologies based on a materialist atheistic philosophy. They strongly condemned the introduction of civil marriages, in addition to church marriages.

Goldstein notes that Stepinac publicly, by name criticized the Communists even before they took power, with the pastoral letter of March 1945 read from all the pulpits across the NDH, again repeated with the pastoral letter of September 1945. This is very different from Stepinac's criticisms of the Ustaše in front of limited audiences, never issuing a pastoral letter against the Ustaše, never even criticizing them by name, and only after the Ustaše had completed most of their genocides. Simultaneously, Stepinac continued to publicly support the same NDH which committed those crimes, until the very end. The pastoral letter's extensive criticism of Communist actions against the Catholic Church, also contrasted with Stepinac's complete silence, noted by Tomasevich, regarding the massive Ustaše attacks on the Serbian Orthodox Church - e.g. the Ustaše killing and exiling of 85% of Orthodox priests, efforts to eliminate the Serbian church and replace it with an Ustaše-created Orthodox church, etc.

In response to this letter Tito spoke out publicly against Stepinac for the first time by writing an editorial on 25 October in the communist party's newspaper Borba accusing Stepinac of declaring war on the fledgling new Yugoslavia. Consequently, on 4 November a crowd of Partisans threw stones at Stepinac in Zaprešić. Tito had established "brotherhood and unity" as the federation's overarching objective and central policy, one which he did not want threatened by internal agitation. In addition, with the escalating Cold War conflict and increased concerns over both Western and Soviet infiltration (see Tito–Stalin split), the Yugoslav government did not tolerate further internal subversion within the potentially fragile new federation.

In an effort to put a stop to the archbishop's activities, Tito attempted to reach an accord with Stepinac, and achieve a greater degree of independence for the Catholic Church in Yugoslavia and Croatia. Stepinac refused to break from the Vatican, and continued to publicly condemn the communist government. Tito, however, was reluctant to bring him to trial, in spite of condemning evidence which was available. In January 1946 the federal government attempted to solicit his replacement with the Papal Nuncio in Belgrade, a request that was denied. Finally, Stepinac was himself asked to leave the country, which he refused. In September 1946 the Yugoslav authorities indicted Stepinac on multiple counts of war crimes and collaboration with the enemy during wartime. Milovan Đilas, a prominent leader in the Party, stated that Stepinac would never have been brought to trial "had he not continued to oppose the new Communist regime." Stella Alexander suggests that Yugoslav authorities wished to balance the arrest and execution of Serb leader Draža Mihailović by moving against a prominent Croat; and in the words of the Public Prosecutor, "to unmask before the world a concerted conspiracy by the western imperial powers against the new Yugoslavia".

Stepinac publicly condemned the new Yugoslav government and its actions during and after World War II, especially for murders of priests by Communist militants.

== Trial ==
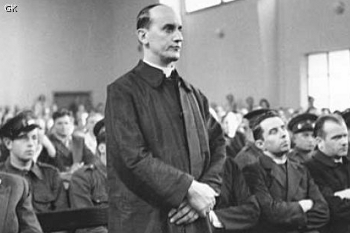
Archbishop Stepinac on trial

By September of the same year the Yugoslav authorities indicted Stepinac on several counts—collaboration with the occupation forces, relations with the Ustaše regime, having chaplains in the Ustaše army as religious agitators, forced conversions of Serb Orthodox to Catholicism at gunpoint and high treason against the Yugoslav government. Stepinac was arrested on 18 September 1946 and his trial started on 30 September 1946, where he was tried alongside former officials of the Ustaše government including Erih Lisak (sentenced to death) and Ivan Šalić. Altogether there were 19 defendants.

The prosecution presented their evidence for the archbishop's collaboration with the Ustaše regime. In relation to these events the prosecution pointed out that even if the archbishop did not explicitly order them, he also did nothing to stop them or punish those within the church who were responsible. The Court appointed two distinguished advocates to defend Stepinac – Dr. Politeo and Dr. Katicic. Stepinac defense acknowledged he paid courtesy calls on Pavelić and other Ustaše leaders as soon as they arrived, but this could be considered normal for the head of the Catholic Church. However, Alexander notes that Stepinac's tone of welcome to Ustaše authorities could have left the clergy in no doubt that they were expected to cooperate with them. Alexander claims his lawyer defended him more convincingly on some other accusations, stating that Stepinac's control over the censored Catholic press had been largely formal, and that he had no control outside his own diocese. When he was appointed NDH military vicar, Stepinac's two deputies, both prominent Ustaše supporters, had already been appointed and it would've been virtually impossible for him to remove them. He had accepted Ustaše archives without examining them, and stowed them in the archbishopric, but later handed them over to the Partisans when they came looking for them. He admitted meeting with former Ustaše chief of police, Erih Lisak, who had secretly returned to Zagreb to fight the new authorities, but Stepinac blamed his secretary for the meeting. Alexander states that Stepinac seemed most uncertain when defending himself against the most serious accusations of forced conversions of the Serbian Orthodox population to Catholicism.

On 3 October as part of the fourth day of the proceedings, Stepinac gave a lengthy 38-minute speech during which he laid down his views on the legitimacy of the trial. He claimed that the process was a "show trial", that he was being attacked in order for the state to attack the Church, and that "no religious conversions were done in bad faith". He went on to state that "My conscience is clear and calm. If you will not give me the right, history will give me that right", and that he did not intend to defend himself or appeal against a conviction, and that he is prepared to take ridicule, disdain, humiliation, and death for his beliefs. He claimed that the military vicariate in the Independent State of Croatia was created to address the needs of the faithful among the soldiers and not for the army itself, nor as a sign of approval of all action by the army. He stated that he was never an Ustaša and that his Croatian nationalism stemmed from the nation's grievances in the Serb-dominated Kingdom of Yugoslavia, and that he never took part in any anti-government or terrorist activities against the state or against Serbs.

Stepinac also pointed to the fact that Yugoslav communists killed a great number of Catholic priests - on 20 September 1945 he already published a letter to the faithful where he brought to light the fact that at least 243 Catholic priests were summarily executed by the communist Yugoslav army for (alleged or real) collaboration with the NDH, with other 169 imprisoned and 89 missing priests. Tomasevich notes that all sides killed priests, starting first with the Ustaše who killed 157 Orthodox priests, including 3 Orthodox bishops. They jailed, tortured and expelled to Serbia the Orthodox archbishop of Zagreb, along with 327 more Orthodox priests. Yet Tomasevich writes that neither Stepinac nor anyone else in the Catholic Church hierarchy uttered a single word of protest against these killings and other massive attacks on the Orthodox church. On the contrary, Tomasevich states that the massive Ustaše attack on the Serbian Orthodox Church "was approved and supported by many Croatian Catholic priests" He also writes that in the NDH some Catholic priests joined the Ustaše, serving in the Ustaše government apparatus, others denounced Partisans, causing their death or deportation to concentration camps, a few became Ustaše officers serving in concentration camps. Above all, Catholic priests engaged in propaganda work for the Ustaše state. Tomasevich notes that most priests killed in the war's aftermath were not killed because they belonged to a specific religion, but because they were participants in a civil war.

Stepinac was arrested on 18 September, and was only given the indictment on the 23rd−meaning his defense counsel Ivo Politeo was given only six to seven days to prepare. Stepinac's defense counsel was only allowed to call twenty witnesses—while the prosecution was allowed to call fifty-eight, most from outside Stepinac's diocese. The President of the Court refused to hear fourteen witnesses for the defense.

On 11 October 1946, the court found Stepinac guilty of collaboration with the fascist Ustaše regime. He was sentenced to 16 years in prison. He served five years in the prison at Lepoglava until he was released in a conciliatory gesture by Tito, on condition that he either retire to Rome or be confined to his home parish of Krašić. He chose to stay in Krašić, saying he would never leave "unless they put me on a plane by force and take me over the frontier."

According to Biondich, Stepinac's conviction for high treason was political, given that the Yugoslav authorities had a vested interest in it. Professor Bogdan Kolar of the University of Ljubljana notes that the chief trial prosecutor, Jakov Blažević, admitted in a 1985 interview with the Slovenian magazine Polet that "Stepinac's only crime was not partaking in the separation of the Church in Croatia from the Vatican."

Tomasevich writes that the government's failure to provide the media and historians full access to all pre-trial and trial materials, puts Stepinac's guilt in question. At the same time Tomasevich notes that Stepinac's failure to publicly condemn the Ustaše's genocidal measures against Serbs and the Orthodox Church, "cannot be defended from the standpoint of humanity, justice and common decency". On the other hand, John Fine states that the trial "was well publicized both at home and abroad by extremely biased figures on both sides, was carried out with the proper legal procedures; there was no torture and a great deal of evidence was brought before the judges, a considerable amount of which was devastating and accurate, and clearly demonstrated the archbishop's collaboration with the Ustaše regime."

The Yugoslav Communist trial against Stepinac is seen by some as a part of a coordinated effort by the Eastern Europe communist regimes to sever the Catholic Church in their countries from Rome, and was near contemporaneous with the Communist trials against the Cardinals Josyf Slipyj of Ukraine, József Mindszenty of Hungary, Josef Beran of Czechoslovakia, and Stefan Wyszyński of Poland.

=== Reactions ===
In the escalating Cold War atmosphere, and with the Vatican putting forward worldwide publicity, the trial was depicted in the West as a typical communist "show trial", in which the testimony was all false. The trial was immediately condemned by the Holy See. All Catholics who had taken part in the court proceedings, including most of the jury members, were excommunicated by Pope Pius XII who referred to the process as the "saddest trial" (tristissimo processo).

In the United States, one of Stepinac's biggest supporters was the Archbishop of Boston, Richard Cushing, who delivered several sermons in support of him. U.S. Acting Secretary of State Dean Acheson on 11 October 1946 bemoaned the conditions in Yugoslavia and stated his regret of the trial.

The National Conference of Christians and Jews at the Bronx Round Table adopted a unanimous resolution on 13 October condemning the trial:

This great churchman has been charged with being a collaborator with the Nazis. We Jews deny that. We know from his record since 1934, that he was a true friend of the Jews ... This man, now the victim of a sham trial, all during the Nazi regime spoke out openly, unafraid, against the dreadful Nuremberg Laws, and his opposition to the Nazi terrorism was never relaxed.

In Britain, on 23 October 1946, Richard Stokes MP declared in the House of Commons that,

[T]he archbishop was our constant ally in 1941, during the worst of the crisis, and thereafter, at a time when the Orthodox Church, which is now comme il faut with the Tito Government, was shaking hands with Mussolini.

On 1 November 1946 Winston Churchill addressed the House of Commons on the subject of the trial, expressing "great sadness" at the result.

This trial was prepared in the political sphere. It was for the purpose of dividing the Catholic Church in Croatia from its leadership at the Vatican. Tito has openly expressed this purpose. ... The trial was not based on justice, but was an outrage on justice. Tito's regime has no interest in justice. It seeks only to stifle opposition.

=== Annulment of the verdict ===
On 22 July 2016, Zagreb County Court annulled the verdict in the review process, as requested by the Archbishop's nephew Boris Stepinac, "due to gross violations of current and former fundamental principles of substantive and procedural criminal law". While explaining the verdict, Judge Ivan Turudić stated that the verdict had violated the principle of the right to a fair trial, appeal and a reasoned court decision, as well as the principle of the prohibition of forced labour and the rule of law, adding that it was enough to read some parts of the minutes of the trial, which demonstrated that the court mainly analyzed evidence that instructed witnesses for the prosecution to charge the defendant and that the actual decision in reality was not made by the court but by prosecutor Jakov Blažević. In conclusion, Turudić stated that the verdict has been revised after nearly 70 years which has a profound significance for the history of the Croatian people. This annulment is, however, highly controversial due to its overtly nationalist Croatian sentiments, the fact that lower court (County Court of Zagreb) annuls the verdict of the Supreme Court, the fact that the whole process of annulment was over in only six days, prosecution was on the same side with the defense (they did not appeal on the annulment) and the judge, who is openly anticommunist, obviously made his decision before the start of the trial. Thus, this annulment can be seen as an example of a show trial.

The Simon Wiesenthal Center strongly condemned the annulment, stating Stepinac "openly supported the regime which committed mass murder, and afforded them spiritual comfort and support... Right now in Croatia there is a cultural, ideological war," with a segment seeking to whitewash or modify the crimes of the Ustasha. The head of the Wiesenthal Center, Efraim Zuroff, also stated that annulment in Croatia was part of a much wider phenomenon, which he has also observed in Ukraine, Lithuania and Hungary – "the tendency to honor people who fought communism, without checking what they did in WWII." Following the annulment, the Yad Vashem Center reaffirmed that the reason for the Committee for the Designation of the Righteous Among the Nations did not grant Stepinac Righteous status "was due to the archbishop's close ties to the Ustasha regime."

== Imprisonment ==
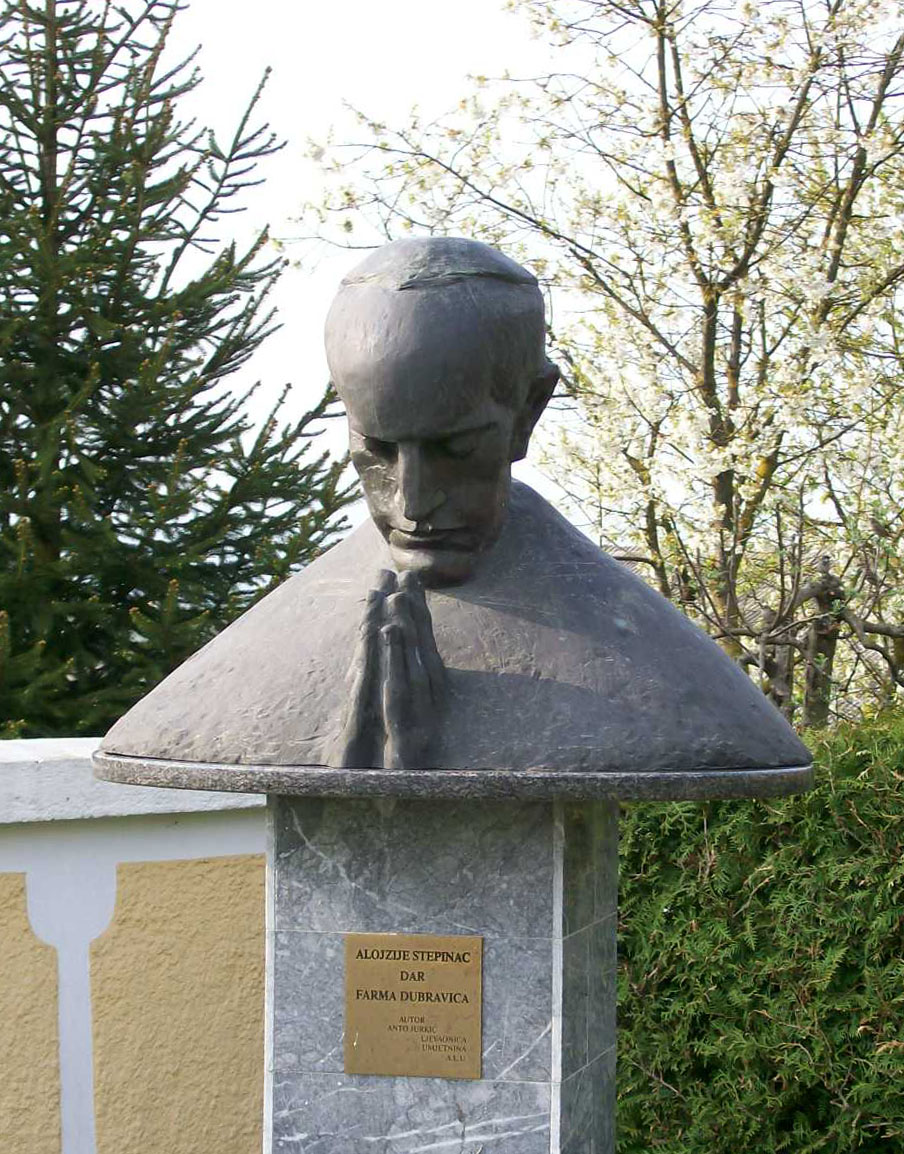
Bust of Stepinac at the village of Rozga near Zagreb.

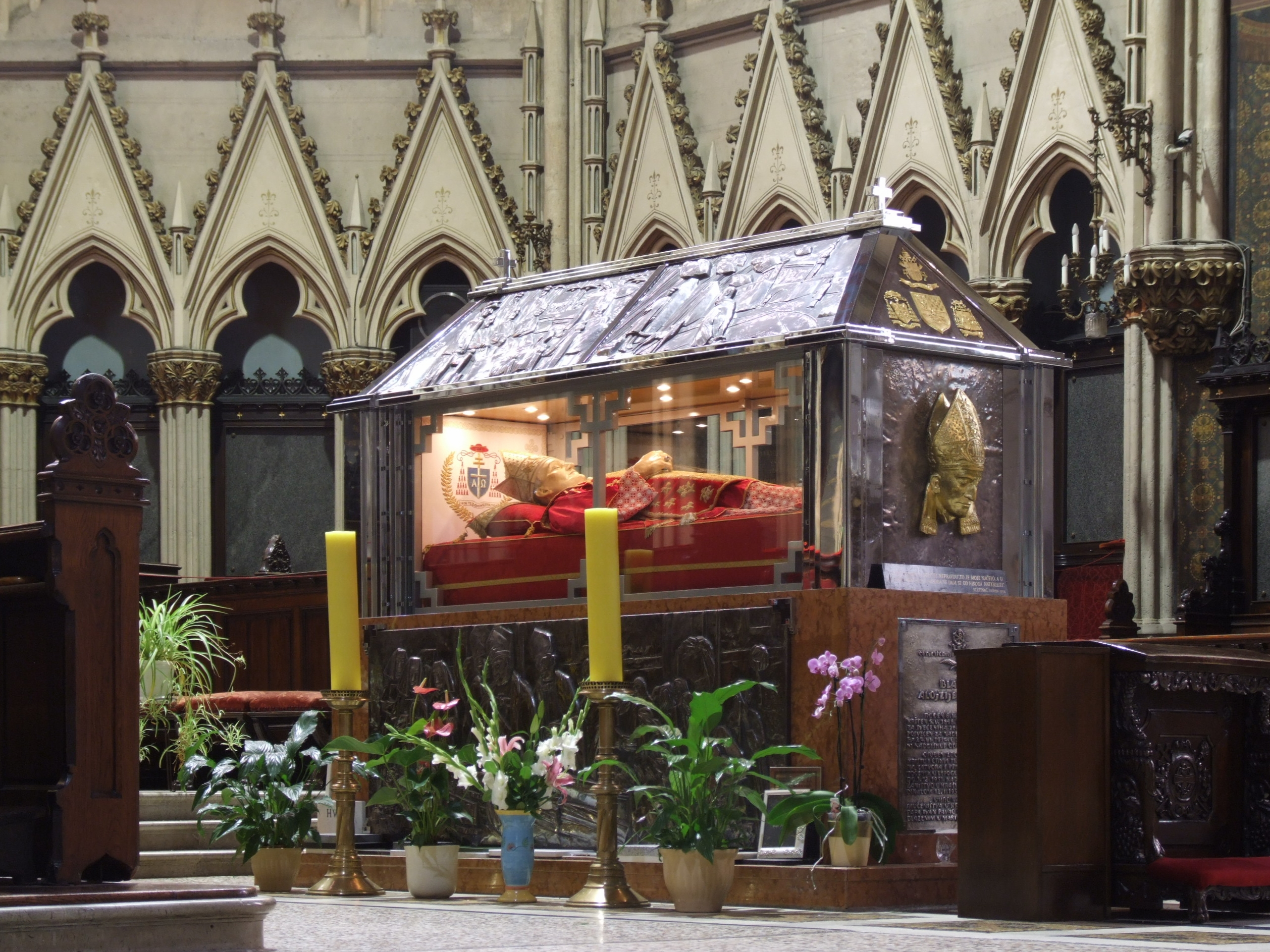
Stepinac's grave in the Zagreb Cathedral

In Stepinac's absence, the Archbishop of Belgrade Josip Ujčić became acting president of the Bishops' Conference of Yugoslavia, a position he held until Stepinac's death. In March 1947 the president of the government of the People's Republic of Croatia Vladimir Bakarić made an official visit to Lepoglava prison to see Stepinac.

He offered that he sign a plea for amnesty to Yugoslavia's leader Josip Broz, who would, in turn, allow Stepinac to leave the country. Instead, Stepinac gave Bakarić a request to Broz that he be retried by a neutral court. He also offered to explain his actions to the Croatian people on the largest square in Zagreb. A positive response was not received from either request. During his imprisonment, Stepinac condemned the "clerical societies" being encouraged by the government as a way of developing more "nationally-aligned" churches.

The 1947 pilgrimage to Marija Bistrica attracted 75,000 people. Dragutin Saili had been in charge of the pilgrimage on the part of the Yugoslav authorities. At a meeting of the Central Committee on 1 August 1947 Saili was chastised for allowing pictures of Stepinac to be carried during the pilgrimage, as long as the pictures were alongside those of Yugoslav leader Josip Broz. Marko Belinić responded to the report by saying, "Saili's path, his poor cooperation with the Local Committee, is a deadly thing".

In February 1949, the United States House of Representatives approved a resolution condemning Stepinac's imprisonment, with the Senate following suit several months later. Aloysius Stepinac eventually served five years of his sixteen-year sentence for high treason in the Lepoglava prison, where he received preferred treatment in recognition of his clerical status. He was allocated two cells for personal use and an additional cell as his private chapel, while being exempt of all hard labor.

In 1950 the noted Irish essayist and historian, Hubert Butler, and Quaker friends managed to visit Stepinac in prison. Troubled by the Catholic Church's support of the Ustaše, and the Church's role in the wartime conversions of Orthodox to Catholicism, Butler asked Stepinac why he had appointed as his deputy on conversions, the bishop Josip Šimrak, an enthusiastic advocate of converting the Orthodox. To which Butler noted, "the archbishop gave the stock reply he had so often given at the trial – notre conscience est tranquille (our conscience is clear)."

In 1950, a group of United States senators made foreign aid to Yugoslavia conditional on Stepinac's release. On 11 November 1951, Cyrus L. Sulzberger from The New York Times visited Stepinac in Lepoglava. He won the Pulitzer Prize for the interview.

A visiting congressional delegation from the United States, including Clement J. Zablocki and Edna F. Kelly, pressed to see Stepinac in late November 1951. Their request was denied by the Yugoslav authorities, but Josip Broz Tito assured the delegation that Stepinac would be released within a month. Stepinac was released as a precondition for American aid, on the condition that he either retire to Rome or be confined to his home parish of Krašić. He refused to leave Yugoslavia and opted to live in Krašić under a form of house arrest, to which he was transferred on 5 December 1951. Among the reporters awaiting Stepinac in his native Krasic were those from the American Time Magazine, who reported that Stepinac "walked easily and firmly", stating of his prison days that "he was not maltreated, could say Mass, have visitors, books and newspapers". When asked about the conditions of his release, Stepinac responded: "I was not released under any conditions. They released me on their own wish...The reason I did not ask to be released is that I don't feel guilty." He lived in the parish presbytery and was able to say Mass in the adjacent church. He stated that: "They will never make me leave unless they put me on a plane by force and take me over the frontier. It is my duty in these difficult times to stay with the people."

At a meeting of the Central Committee of the Communist Party of Croatia on 5 October 1951, Ivan Krajačić said, "In America they are printing Crvena ruža na oltaru [Red Roses on the Altar] of 350 pages, in which is described the entire Stepinac process. Religious education is particularly recently being taught on a large scale. We should do something about this. We could ban religious education. We could ban religious education in schools, but they will then pass it into their churches". On 31 January 1952 the Yugoslav authorities abolished religious education in state-run public schools, as part of the programme of separating church and state in Yugoslavia. In April, Stepinac told a journalist from Belgium's La Liberté, "I am greatly concerned about Catholic youth. In schools they are carrying out intensive communist propaganda, based on negating the truth".

== Cardinalate ==
On 29 November 1952, Pope Pius XII announced he would make Stepinac a cardinal in January 1953; the day coincided with Yugoslavia's Republic Day. Stepinac did not attend the ceremony on 12 January 1953, afraid that if he travelled to Rome he would not be allowed to return to Yugoslavia. Pope Pius XII had intended to name Stepinac the first cardinal-priest of San Paolo alla Regola. On 21 December 2020, Cardinal Francesco Monterisi, who then held the title, dedicated a plaque placed at the church to honor Stepinac.

Yugoslavia severed diplomatic relations with the Vatican in October 1953. In 1954, Stepinac received a rare visit from a Swedish journalist, to whom he said, "I tried to save, and did save, thousands of lives", and "[a]s for the massacres in the churches, what could I do?" The government also expelled the Catholic Faculty of Theology from the University of Zagreb, to which it was not restored until the first democratic elections were held in 1990, and was finally formalized in 1996.

Pope Pius wrote to Stepinac and three other jailed prelates (Cardinals Stefan Wyszyński and József Mindszenty, and Archbishop Josef Beran) on 29 June 1956 urging their supporters to remain loyal. Stepinac was prevented by his house arrest from participating in the 1958 conclave to elect a new pope, despite calls from the Bishops' Conference of Yugoslavia for his release. On 2 June 1959 he wrote in a letter to Ivan Meštrović: "I likely will not live to see the collapse of communism in the world due to my poor health. But I am absolutely certain of that collapse."

== Death and canonisation controversies ==
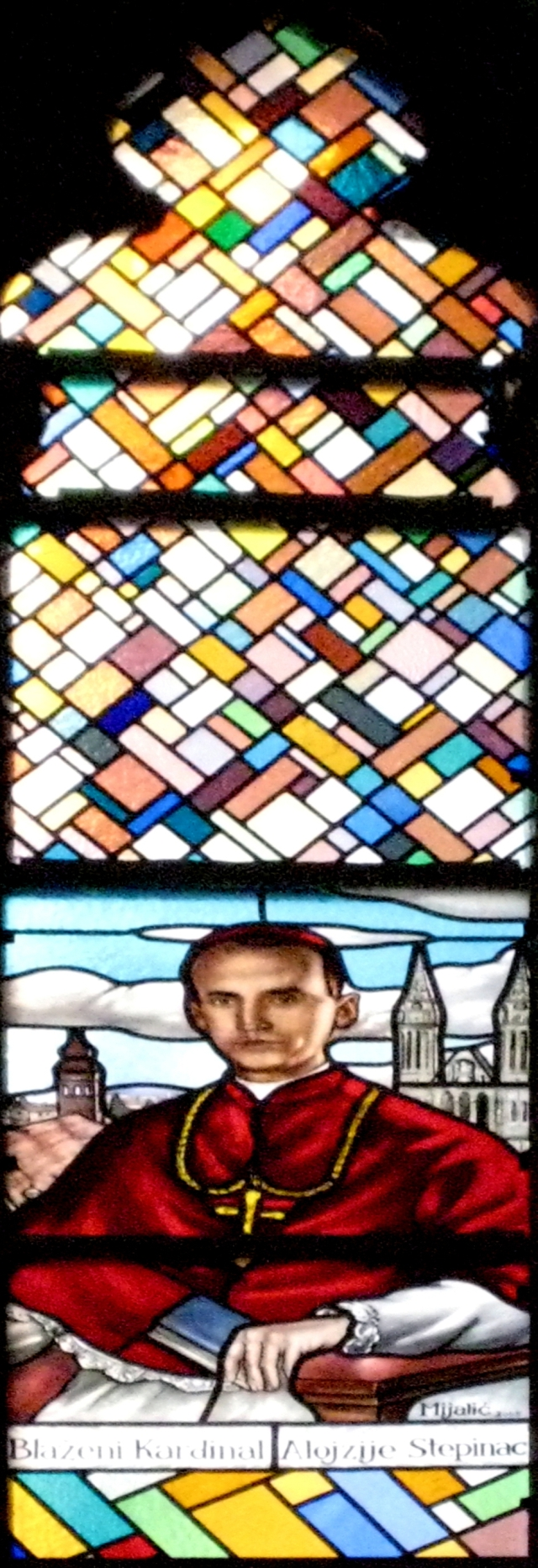
Stained glass in the Church of Virgin Mary of Lourdes in Rijeka

In 1953, two American medical specialists, Dr. John H. Lawrence and Dr. John Ruzic, flew to Yugoslavia and diagnosed Stepinac with polycythemia, a disease marked by an increase in red blood cells. Stepinac was also treated for the disease by internationally known German hematologist, Dr. Ludwig Heilmeyer. On 10 February 1960 at the age of 61, Stepinac died of a thrombosis. The government, which had never acknowledged his status as a cardinal, first planned a small funeral service and burial in Krasic, his native village which few were allowed to visit, but then allowed a large-scale public funeral, a reversal seen as an attempt to improve relations with the Vatican. He was buried in the Zagreb Cathedral following a service in which the protocols appropriate to his senior clerical status were, with Tito's permission, fully observed. Archbishop Franjo Seper, who became archbishop of Zagreb upon Stepinac's death, presided in place of Cardinal Franz König, Archbishop of Vienna, who was scheduled to preside, but was injured in a traffic accident en route and had to be hospitalized. Pope John XXIII participated in a requiem mass for Stepinac on 17 February in St Peter's Basilica. The Yugoslav government's relations with the Vatican improved after Stepinac's death, and developed further after the Second Vatican Council of 1962–65. Diplomatic relations were restored in 1966. Though Stepinac died peacefully at home, he was viewed as a martyr by his supporters and many other Catholics. In 1998, traces of arsenic were detected in Stepinac's bones, leading many to believe he had been poisoned by his captors. But the administration of arsenic along with bloodletting was a standard treatment for polycythemia in the early 1950s.

Meštrović did not return to Yugoslavia until 1959 and upon his return met again with Stepinac, who was then under house arrest. Meštrović sculpted a bust of Stepinac after his death with an inscription that reads: "Archbishop Stepinac was not a man of idle words, but rather, he actively helped every person─when he was able, and to the extent he was able. He made no distinctions as to whether a man in need was a Croat or a Serb, whether he was a Catholic or an Orthodox, whether he was Christian or non-Christian. All the attacks upon him be they the product of misinformation, or the product of a clouded mind, cannot change this fact."

In 1970, Glas Koncila published a text on Stepinac taken from L'Osservatore Romano which resulted in the edition being confiscated by court decree.

In May 1979, Archbishop Franjo Kuharić told Croatian pilgrims and Pope John Paul II at St. Peter's Basilica in Rome that Cardinal Stepinac should be beatified. The beatification process began on 9 October 1981. The Catholic Church declared Stepinac a martyr on 11 November 1997, and on 3 October 1998 Pope John Paul II, on pilgrimage to Marija Bistrica to beatify Stepinac, declared that Stepinac had indeed been martyred. John Paul had earlier determined that where a candidate for sainthood had been martyred, his/her cause could be advanced without the normal requirement for evidence of a miraculous intercession by the candidate. Accordingly, he beatified him.

The beatification re-ignited old divisions between Serbs, who are mainly Eastern Orthodox, and Croats. Shortly prior, the Paris-based Simon Wiesenthal Center requested that the Holy See delay the beatification until the case was given further study.

According to Ljubojević, Gavrilović and Perica, the mythology regarding Stepinac was created during the Cold War and newly independent Croatia with the cardinal's beatification in 1998. Their assessment is that this myth positioned Stepinac as the primary character in Croatian mythology, crediting him as a hero and martyr who was politically impartial. This myth alleges that Stepinac resisted all forms of totalitarianism in equal measure. The authors claim that Stepinac was a much greater opponent of communism than he was of Nazism and fascism, and that his story was used by Croatian President Franjo Tudjman to legitimise Croatian independence and to bolster the role of the Catholic Church as a central pillar of Croatian statehood.

In May 2019, Pope Francis said he had sought advice and help of the Serbian Orthodox Patriarch Irenaeus on the canonization issue. Archbishop Želimir Puljić, president of the Croatian Conference of Bishops stated that the involvement of the Serbian Orthodox Church in Stepinac's canonisation would set a negative precedent in the Catholic Church. Mile Bigović, Bishop Emeritus of Gospić-Senj, called such a move on the part of the pope "not good for the Church".

Vatican Secretary of State Cardinal Pietro Parolin addressed the issue during a visit to Croatia in September 2020. His remarks were interpreted by Croatian commentators and prelates as a clear indication that there would be no progress in Stepinac's cause under Pope Francis.

== Legacy ==
On 14 February 1992, Croatian representative Vladimir Šeks put forth a declaration in the Croatian Sabor condemning the court decision and the process that led to it. The declaration was passed, along with a similar one about the death of Croatian communist official Andrija Hebrang. The declaration states that the true reason of Stepinac's imprisonment was his pointing out many communist crimes and especially refusing to form a Croatian Catholic Church in schism with the Pope. The verdict has not been formally challenged nor overturned in any court between 1997 and 1999 while it was possible under Croatian law. In 1998, the Croatian National Bank released commemoratives 500 kuna gold and 150 kuna silver coins.

In 2007, the municipality of Marija Bistrica began on a project called Stepinac's Path, which would build pilgrimage paths linking places significant to the cardinal: Krašić, Kaptol in Zagreb, Medvednica, Marija Bistrica, and Lepoglava. The Aloysius Stepinac Museum opened in Zagreb in 2007.

Croatian football international Dario Šimić wore a T-shirt with Stepinac's image on it under his jersey during the country's UEFA Euro 2008 game against Poland, which he revealed after the game.

In 2008, a total of 119 streets in Croatia were named after Alojzije Stepinac, making him the tenth most common person eponym of streets in the country.

=== Declined Nomination to Righteous Among the Nations ===
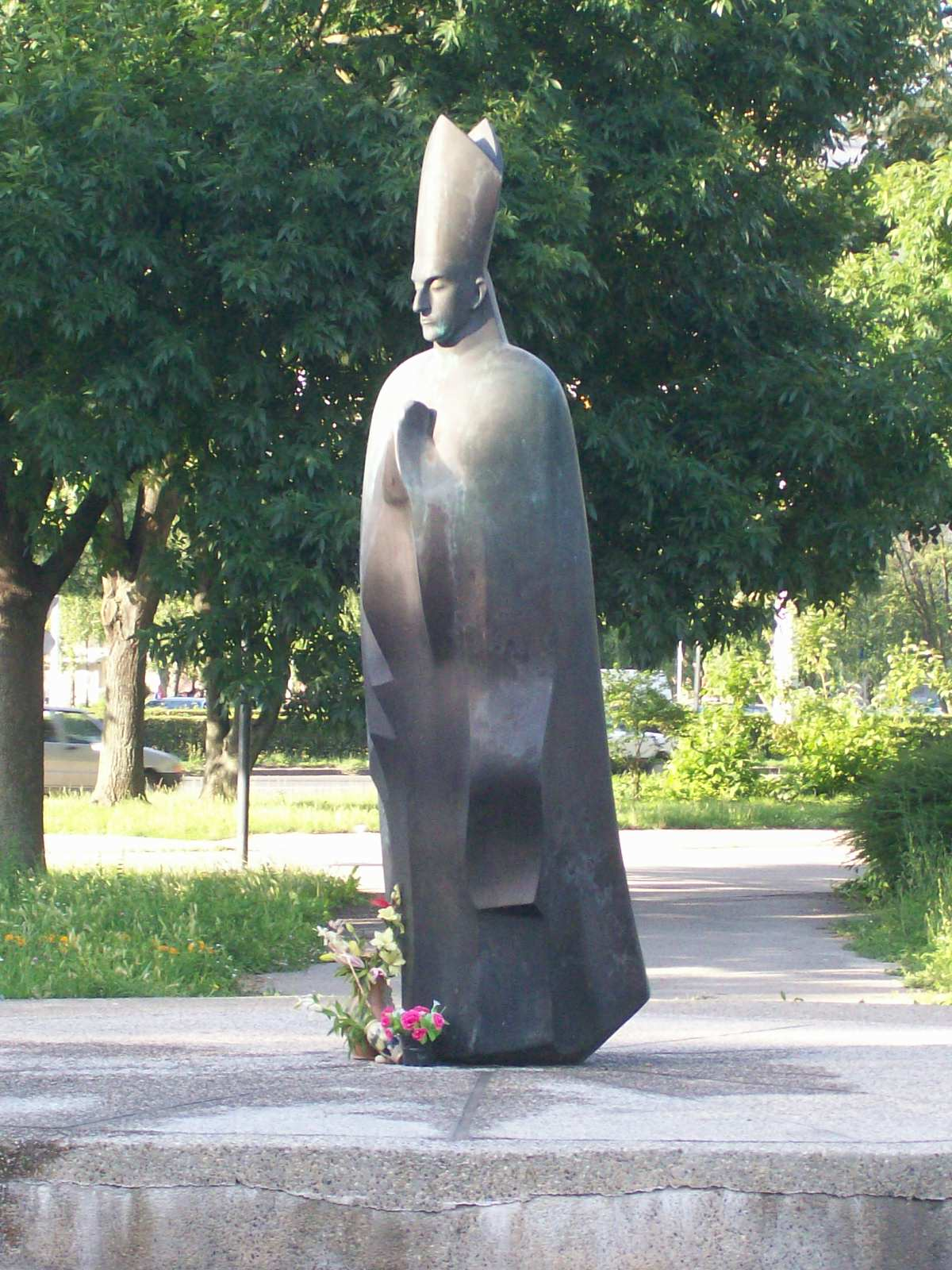
A statue of Stepinac in Zagreb

Several Croatian Jews (including Esther Gitman, a Jew from Sarajevo living in the USA) recommended that Stepinac be added to the list of the Righteous Among the Nations because he saved some Jews on condition of conversion to Catholicism. Yad Vashem declined, and replied: "Persons who assisted Jews but simultaneously collaborated or were linked with a fascist regime which took part in the Nazi-orchestrated persecution of Jews, are disqualified for the Righteous title."

== Primary sources ==
Although Stepinac's life has been the subject of much writing, there are very few primary sources for researchers to draw upon, the main one being the Katolički List, a diocesan weekly journal.

Stepinac's diary, discovered in 1950 (too late to be used in his trial), was confiscated by the Yugoslav authorities. Franjo Tudjman returned the diary to the Church in the early 1990s. Croatian historian and publisher Zvonimir Despot published a collection of transcripts from the diary, edited by historian Željko Karaula, and noted that the Church has refused to publish the original diary. Juraj Batelja, the official Church Postulator advocating Stepinac's canonization, has for years selectively used parts of the diary for his books, without other researchers having an opportunity to see the original text. Despot notes that Stepinac did not write the diary as a private person, but as the Archbishop, and the diary is an extremely important source for Croatian history, that should not be hidden.

Father Josip Vranković kept a diary from December 1951 to 10 February 1960, recording what Stepinac related to him each day; that diary was used by Franciscan Aleksa Benigar to write a biography of Stepinac, but Benigar refused to share the diary with any other researcher. The diocesan archives were also made available to Benigar, but no other researcher.

The official transcript of Stepinac's trial Suđenje Lisaku, Stepincu etc. was published in Zagreb in 1946, but contains substantial evidence of alteration. Alexander's Triple Myth therefore relies on the Yugoslav and foreign press—particularly Vjesnik and Narodne Novine—as well as Katolički List. All other primary sources available to researchers only indirectly focus on Stepinac.

== See also ==
- Persecution of Christians in the Eastern Bloc
- Anti-Catholicism
- Catholic clergy involvement with the Ustaše
- Archbishop Stepinac High School
- John Fisher

== Footnotes ==
Catholic Church titles
Preceded by Antun Bauer	Archbishop of Zagreb; 7 December 1937 – 10 February 1960	Succeeded by Franjo Šeper
