= Stella Alexander =

British writer and scholar of Balkan history

- Born: Helen Stella Tucker; 1912; Shanghai, China
- Died: 1998 (aged 85–86)
- Relatives: John Calvin Ferguson (maternal grandfather)

Stella Alexander (née Tucker, 1912–1998) was a British writer and scholar born and raised in China. The British Library holds her letters and unpublished memoirs, covering a wide range of subject areas, including the Quaker movement, Yugoslavian history, and the Japanese occupation of Shanghai during World War II.

== Biography ==
Alexander was born in Shanghai in June 1912, the daughter of American bullion broker George Edwin Tucker, and Helen Matilda Ferguson, a Canadian-American mother who also grew up in China. Her maternal grandfather was John Calvin Ferguson, sinologist and art historian.

She went to university in Oxford, England, where she met and then married a British diplomat, John Alexander. They married in 1933 in Chelsea, London. The couple returned to Shanghai following their marriage. Her son was born in 1934 in Nanking. She later applied for a delayed birth certificate from the U.S. indicating her American-born father and years lived in the United States in Anchorage, Kentucky from 1925-1928, and regular visits in the following years, which contemporary passenger lists corroborate.

At the time of their return to China, Shanghai was occupied by Japan. In 1941, Japan attacked Pearl Harbor and foreign diplomats living in China were interned, including the Alexanders in the Cathay Hotel in Shanghai. In 1942, they returned to the US following a citizen exchange between Japan and the US.

Alexander and her husband divorced in 1950 and she began working for the United Nations Association, becoming increasingly involved with the Quakers. In 1957, she represented the Quakers' London Yearly Meeting at the UN General Assembly.

Alexander's interest in Yugoslavia began in the late 1950s, and between 1961 and the 1970s she travelled there almost annually. She travelled the country, often alone, learned Serbo-Croatian and wrote extensively on what she saw. Her writings are rare eye-witness accounts on life in Eastern Europe during the Cold War.

She remained active in Quaker affairs till her conversion to the Catholic Church in 1991.

== Publications ==
- Alexander, S. (1958). Quaker testimony against slavery and racial discrimination: an anthology. London: Friends' Home Service Committee.
- Alexander, S. (1979). Church and state in Yugoslavia since 1945. Cambridge: Cambridge University Press.
- Alexander, S. (1987). The triple myth: A life of Archbishop Alojzije Stepinac. New York: Columbia University Press.
