= Ivo Politeo =

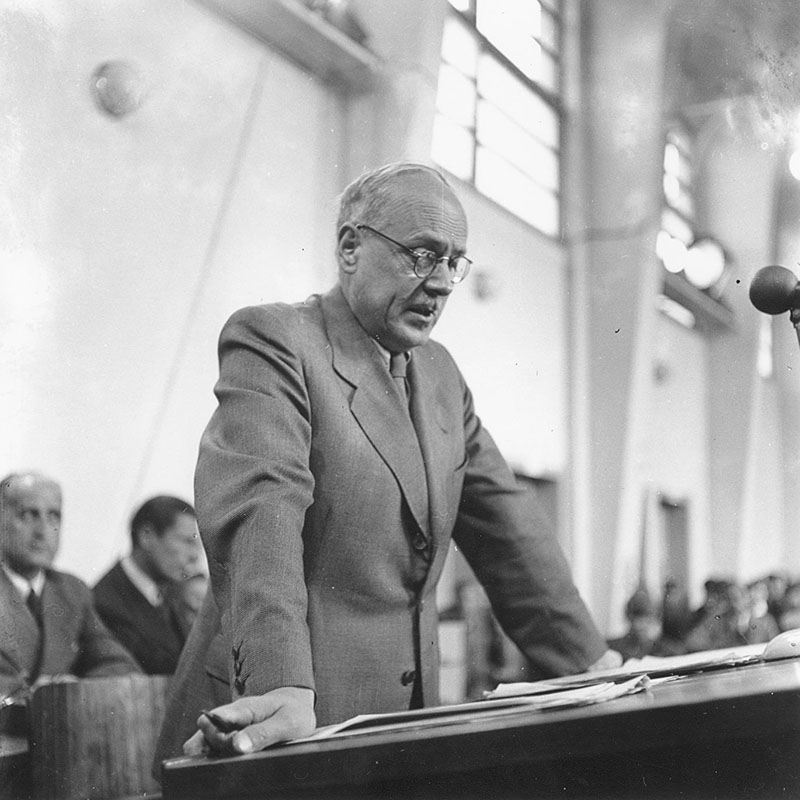
Ivo Politeo

Ivo Politeo (1887 in Split – 1956 in Zagreb) was a Croatian lawyer who represented the persecuted.

From 1919 until his death he worked as a lawyer in Zagreb. He defended people in politically motivated trials. He defended Josip Broz in 1928. In 1928, Politeo was arrested by the Royal Yugoslav government at the founding of the Croatian Bar Association and was subsequently elected its first president.

After World War II he defended Archbishop Aloysius Stepinac. Politeo's files from the Stepinac case are preserved in the Croatian State Archives. In 1954 he prepared the Codex of Professional Ethics of Lawyers for the International Lawyers Union.

The Croatian Bar Association awards the Dr. Ivo Politeo Award.
