= Brezarić =

- Village
- Location within Croatia
- Coordinates: 45°39′N 15°30′E
- Country: Croatia

Area
  - Total: 3.8 km^{2} (1.5 sq mi)

Population (2021)
  - Total: 242
  - Density: 64/km^{2} (160/sq mi)
- Time zone: UTC+1 (CET)
  - Summer (DST): UTC+2 (CEST)

Brezarić is a settlement in Croatia in Krašić, municipality in central Croatia. Brezarić covers an area of 3.81 square kilometers.

In the 2001 census, the total population was 306.

Brezarić is the birthplace of the late Croatian Cardinal Blessed Aloysius Stepinac.
