= Čučići =

- Village
- Location within Croatia
- Coordinates: 45°39′N 15°30′E
- Country: Croatia

Area
  - Total: 2.1 km^{2} (0.81 sq mi)

Population (2021)
  - Total: 1
  - Density: 0.48/km^{2} (1.2/sq mi)
- Time zone: UTC+1 (CET)
  - Summer (DST): UTC+2 (CEST)

Čučići is an uninhabited settlement in Croatia. It is in Zagreb County.
