= Ustaše =

Croatian fascist and ultranationalist organization (1929–1945)

- Ustaša – hrvatske revolucionarne organizacije
- Leader: Ante Pavelić X (Note: Ante Pavelić began using the title of Poglavnik (lit. 'leader' or 'guide'). After the war, Pavelić died on 28 December 1959 at the Hospital Alemán in Madrid, aged 70, from the wounds he had sustained in the assassination attempt.)
- Founded: 7 January 1929
- Dissolved: 25 May 1945 (de facto)
- Groups: Ustaše Militia; Ustaše Youth
- Headquarters: Turin, Italy (until 1941); Zagreb, Croatia (from 1941)
- Ideology: Croatian socialism; Clerical fascism; Ultranationalism; Ethnocracy; Irredentism; Antisemitism; Anti-Serb sentiment; Anti-Romani sentiment; Anti-Slavic sentiment; Aryanism; Roman Catholicism
- Political position: Far-right
- Anthem: Puška puca
- Size: 100,000 (May 1941 est.)
- Part of: Main Ustaša Headquarters

The Ustaše (pronounced [ûstaʃe]; anglicised as Ustasha or Ustashe) (Note: They are variously known in English as the Ustaše, Ustashe, Ustashi, Ustahis, or Ustashas (OED 2020 adds Ustachi, Ustaci, Ustasha, Ustaša, and Ustasi); with the associated adjective sometimes being Ustashe or Ustasha, apart from Ustaše. This variance stems from the fact that Ustaše is the plural form of Ustaša in the Serbo-Croatian language.) was a Croatian fascist and ultranationalist organization active, as one organization, between 1929 and 1945. It was formally known as the Ustaša – Croatian Revolutionary Movement (Croatian: Ustaša – Hrvatski revolucionarni pokret). From its inception and before the Second World War, the organization engaged in a series of terrorist activities against the Kingdom of Yugoslavia. It collaborated with IMRO to assassinate King Alexander I of Yugoslavia in 1934. During World War II in Yugoslavia, the Ustaše went on to perpetrate the Holocaust and genocide against its Jewish, Serb and Roma populations, killing hundreds of thousands of Serbs, Jews, Roma, as well as Muslim and Croat political dissidents. The ideology of the movement combined aspects of Clerical fascism (particularly derived from Roman Catholicism) and Croatian ultranationalism.

The Ustaše supported the creation of a Greater Croatia. The movement advocated a racially "pure" Croatia and promoted genocide against Serbs—due to the Ustaše's anti-Serb sentiment—and Holocaust against Jews and Roma via Nazi racial theory, and persecution of anti-fascist or dissident Croats and Bosniaks. They viewed the Bosniaks as "Muslim Croats" sparing their prosecution. After the invasion of Yugoslavia in April 1941, the Ustaše came to power with the Independent State of Croatia (NDH), established as an Italo-German quasi-protectorate in which German influence steadily increased over time as Italian influence waned. The state owed its creation and continued existence to the two Axis powers. The Ustaše Militia was its military wing. With the German surrender, end of World War II in Europe, and the establishment of socialist Yugoslavia in 1945, the Ustaše movement collapsed.

The militarily weak Ustaše failed to ever garner significant support among Croats. Many of those that did initially support the regime in the interwar period – who felt oppressed by the Serb-led Yugoslavia, were alienated by its brutality.

== Name ==
The word ustaša (plural: ustaše) is derived from the intransitive verb ustati (Croatian for rise up). "Pučki-ustaša" (German: Landsturm) was a military rank in the Imperial Croatian Home Guard (1868–1918). The same term was the name of Croatian third-class infantry regiments (German: Landsturm regiments) during World War I (1914–1918). Another variation of the word ustati is ustanik (plural: ustanici) which means an insurgent, or a rebel. The name ustaša did not have fascist connotations during the early years of the Kingdom of Yugoslavia as the term "ustat" was itself used in Herzegovina to denote the insurgents from the Herzegovinian rebellion of 1875. The full original name of the organization appeared in April 1931 as the Ustaša – Hrvatska revolucionarna organizacija or UHRO (Ustaša – Croatian Revolutionary Organization). In 1933 it was renamed the Ustaša – Hrvatski revolucionarni pokret (Ustaša – Croatian Revolutionary Movement), a name it kept until World War II. In English, Ustasha, Ustashe, Ustashas and Ustashi are used for the movement or its members.

== Ideology ==
=== Ideological roots ===
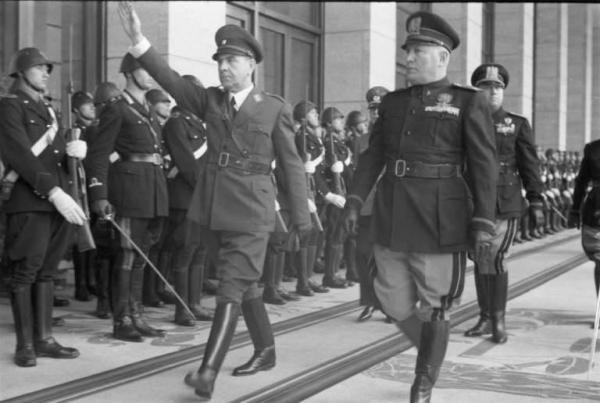
Poglavnik Ante Pavelić and Italy's Duce Benito Mussolini on 18 May 1941 in Rome. The Ustaše were heavily influenced by Italian Fascism and politically supported by Fascist Italy.

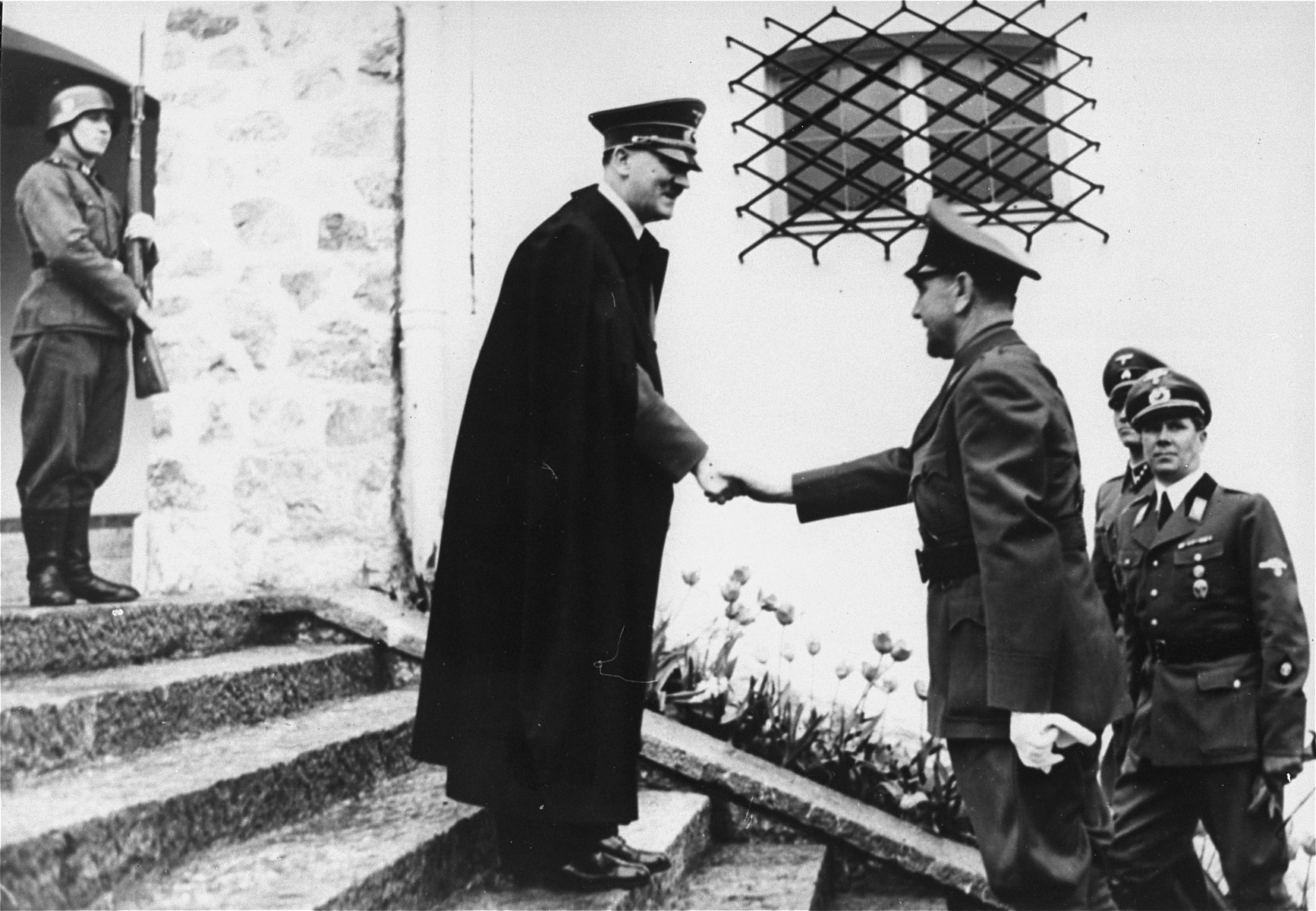
Germany's Führer Adolf Hitler with Pavelić at the Berghof outside Berchtesgaden, Germany. The Ustaše increasingly came under the influence of Nazism after the founding of the NDH in 1941.

One of the major ideological influences on the Croatian nationalism of the Ustaše was 19th century Croatian activist Ante Starčević, an advocate of Croatian unity and independence, who was both anti-Habsburg and anti-Serbian in outlook.

He envisioned the creation of a Greater Croatia that would include territories inhabited by Bosniaks, Serbs, and Slovenes, considering Bosniaks and Serbs to be Croats who had been converted to Islam and Orthodox Christianity, and considered the Slovenes "mountain Croats". Starčević argued that the large Serb presence in territories claimed by a Greater Croatia was the result of recent settlement, encouraged by Habsburg rulers, and the influx of groups like Vlachs who took up Orthodox Christianity and identified themselves as Serbs. Starčević admired Bosniaks because in his view they were Croats who had adopted Islam in order to preserve the economic and political autonomy of Bosnia and Croatia under the Ottoman occupation.

The Ustaše used Starčević's theories to promote their own annexation of Bosnia and Herzegovina to Croatia and recognized Croatia as having two major ethnocultural components: Catholics and Muslims. The Ustaše sought to represent Starčević as being connected to their views. Josip Frank seceded his extreme fraction from Starčević's Party of Rights and formed his own, the Pure Party of Rights, which became the main pool of members of the subsequent Ustaše movement. Historian John Paul Newman stated that Austro-Hungarian officers' "unfaltering opposition to Yugoslavia provided a blueprint for the Croatian radical right, the Ustaše".

The Ustaše promoted the theories of Milan Šufflay, who is believed to have claimed that Croatia had been "one of the strongest ramparts of Western civilization for many centuries", which he claimed had been lost through its union with Serbia when the nation of Yugoslavia was formed in 1918. Šufflay was killed in Zagreb in 1931 by government supporters.

The Ustaše accepted the 1935 thesis of Krunoslav Draganović, a Catholic priest who claimed that many Catholics in southern Herzegovina had been converted to Orthodox Christianity in the 16th and 17th centuries, in order to justify their own policy of forcible conversion of Orthodox Christians to Catholicism.

The Ustaše were heavily influenced by Nazism and fascism. Its leader, Ante Pavelić, held the position of Poglavnik, which was based on the similar positions of Duce held by Benito Mussolini and Führer held by Adolf Hitler. The Ustaše, like fascists, promoted a corporatist economy. Pavelić and the Ustaše were allowed sanctuary in Italy by Mussolini after being exiled from Yugoslavia. Pavelić had been in negotiations with Fascist Italy since 1927 that included advocating a territory-for-sovereignty swap in which he would tolerate Italy annexing its claimed territory in Dalmatia in exchange for Italy supporting the sovereignty of an independent Croatia. The Ustaše ideology has also been characterized as clerical fascism by several authors, who emphasize the importance the movement attached to Roman Catholicism.

Mussolini's support of the Ustaše was based on pragmatic considerations, such as maximizing Italian influence in the Balkans and the Adriatic. After 1937, with the weakening of French influence in Europe following Germany's remilitarization of the Rhineland and with the rise of a quasi-fascist government in Yugoslavia under Milan Stojadinović, Mussolini abandoned support for the Ustaše from 1937 to 1939 and sought to improve relations with Yugoslavia, fearing that continued hostility towards Yugoslavia would result in Yugoslavia entering Germany's sphere of influence.

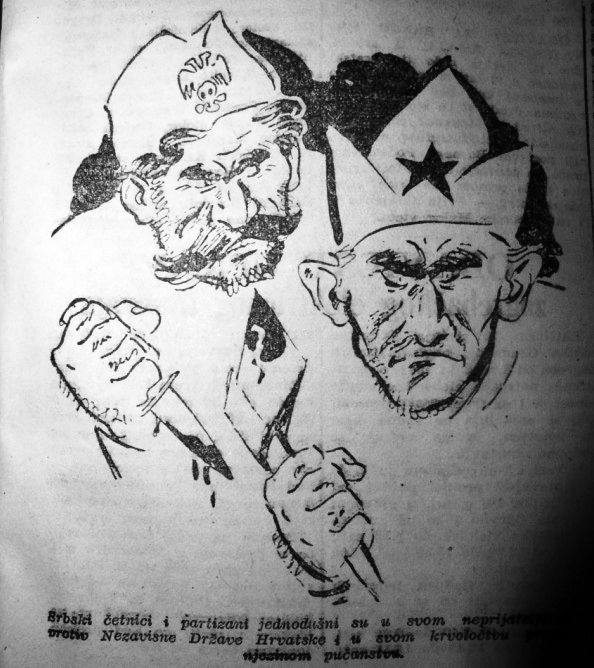
Anti-Chetnik (anti-Serb) and anti-communist Ustaše poster

The collapse of the quasi-fascist Stojadinović regime resulted in Italy restoring its support for the Ustaše, whose aim was to create an independent Croatia in personal union with Italy. However, distrust of the Ustaše grew. Mussolini's son-in-law and Italian foreign minister Count Galeazzo Ciano noted in his diary that "The Duce is indignant with Pavelić, because he claims that the Croats are descendants of the Goths. This will have the effect of bringing them into the German orbit".

Hungary strongly supported the Ustaše for two aims. One, in order to weaken Yugoslavia, Little Entente, in order to ultimately regain some of its lost territories. The other, Hungary also wished to establish later in the future a strong alliance with the Independent State of Croatia and possibly enter a personal union.

Nazi Germany initially did not support an independent Croatia, nor did it support the Ustaše, with Hitler stressing the importance of a "strong and united Yugoslavia". Nazi officials, including Hermann Göring, wanted Yugoslavia stable and officially neutral during the war so Germany could continue to securely gain Yugoslavia's raw material exports. The Nazis grew irritated with the Ustaše, among them Reichsfuhrer SS Heinrich Himmler, who was dissatisfied with the lack of full compliance by the NDH to the Nazis' agenda of extermination of the Jews, as the Ustaše permitted Jews who converted to Catholicism to be recognized as "honorary Croats", thus putatively exempt from persecution.

=== Political programme and main agendas ===
In 1932, an editorial in the first issue of the Ustaše newspaper, signed by the Ustaše leader Ante Pavelić, proclaimed that violence and terror would be the main means for the Ustaše to attain their goals:

The KNIFE, REVOLVER, MACHINE GUN and TIME BOMB; these are the idols, these are bells that will announce the dawning and THE RESURRECTION OF THE INDEPENDENT STATE OF CROATIA.

In 1933, the Ustaše presented "The Seventeen Principles" that formed the official ideology of the movement. The Principles stated the uniqueness of the Croatian nation, promoted collective rights over individual rights and declared that people who were not Croat by "blood" would be excluded from political life.

Those considered "undesirables" were subjected to mass murder. These principles called for the creation of a new economic system that would be neither capitalist nor communist and which would emphasize the importance of the Roman Catholic Church and the patriarchial family as means to maintain social order and morality. (The name given by modern historians to this particular aspect of Ustaše ideology varies; "national Catholicism", "political Catholicism" and "Catholic Croatism" have been proposed among others.) In power, the Ustaše banned contraception and tightened laws against blasphemy.

Ustaše gathering in Zagreb between 1941 and 1945

The Ustaše accepted that Croats are part of the Dinaric race, but rejected the idea that Croats are primarily Slavic, claiming they primarily come from Germanic roots with the Goths. The Ustaše believed that a government must naturally be strong and authoritarian. The movement opposed parliamentary democracy for being "corrupt" and Marxism and Bolshevism for interfering in family life and the economy and for their materialism. The Ustaše considered competing political parties and elected parliaments to be harmful to its own interests.

The Ustaše recognized both Roman Catholicism and Islam as national religions of the Croatian people but initially rejected Orthodox Christianity as being incompatible with their objectives. Although the Ustaše emphasized religious themes, it stressed that duty to the nation took precedence over religious custom.

In power, the Ustaše banned the use of the term "Serbian Orthodox faith", requiring "Greek-Eastern faith" in its place. The Ustaše forcefully converted many Orthodox to Catholicism, murdered and expelled 85% of Orthodox priests, and plundered and burnt many Orthodox Christian churches. The Ustaše also persecuted Old Catholics who did not recognize papal infallibility. On 2 July 1942 the Croatian Orthodox Church was founded, as a further means to destroy the Serbian Orthodox Church, but this new church gained very few followers and was abolished in 1945.

=== Antisemitism ===
While initial focus was against Serbs, as the Ustaše grew closer to the Nazis they adopted antisemitism. In 1936, in "The Croat Question", Ante Pavelić placed Jews third among "the Enemies of the Croats" (after Serbs and Freemasons, but before Communists): writing:

Today, practically all finance and nearly all commerce in Croatia is in Jewish hands. This became possible only through the support of the state, which thereby seeks, on one hand, to strengthen the pro-Serbian Jews, and on the other, to weaken Croat national strength. The Jews celebrated the establishment of the so-called Yugoslav state with great joy, because a national Croatia could never be as useful to them as a multi-national Yugoslavia; for in national chaos lies the power of the Jews ... In fact, as the Jews had foreseen, Yugoslavia became, in consequence of the corruption of official life in Serbia, a true Eldorado of Jewry.

Once in power, the Ustaše immediately introduced a series of Nazi-style racial laws. On 30 April 1941, the Ustaše proclaimed the "Legal Decree on Racial Origins", the "Legal Decree on the Protection of Aryan Blood and the Honor of the Croatian People", and the "Legal Provision on Citizenship". These decrees defined who was a Jew, and took away the citizenship rights of all non-Aryans, i.e. Jews and Roma. By the end of April 1941, months before the Nazis implemented similar measures in Germany and over a year after they were implemented in occupied Poland, the Ustaše required all Jews to wear insignia, typically a yellow Star of David. The Ustaše declared the "Legal Provision on the Nationalization of the Property of Jews and Jewish Companies", on 10 October 1941, and with it they confiscated all Jewish property.

Already on their first day, 10–11 April 1941, Ustaše arrested a group of prominent Zagreb Jews and held them for ransom. On 13 April the same was done in Osijek, where Ustaše and Volksdeutscher mobs also destroyed the synagogue and Jewish graveyard. This process was repeated multiple times in 1941 with groups of Jews. Simultaneously, the Ustaše initiated extensive antisemitic propaganda, with Ustaše papers writing that Croatians must "be more alert than any other ethnic group to protect their racial purity, ... We need to keep our blood clean of the Jews". They also wrote that Jews are synonymous with "treachery, cheating, greed, immorality and foreigness", and therefore "wide swaths of the Croatian people always despised the Jews and felt towards them natural revulsion".

In May 1941, the Ustaše rounded up 165 Jewish youth in Zagreb, members of the Jewish sports club Makabi, and sent them to the Danica concentration camp. All but three were later killed by the Ustaše. The Ustaše sent most Jews to Ustaše and Nazi concentration camps—including the notorious, Ustaše-run Jasenovac concentration camp—where nearly 32,000, or 80% of the Jews in the Independent State of Croatia, were killed. In October 1941, the Ustaše mayor of Zagreb ordered the demolition of the Zagreb Synagogue, which was completely demolished by April 1942. The Ustaše persecuted Jews who practiced Judaism but authorized Jewish converts to Catholicism to be recognized as Croatian citizens and be given honorary Aryan citizenship that allowed them to be reinstated at the jobs from which they had previously been separated. After they stripped Jews of their citizenship rights, the Ustaše allowed some to apply for Aryan rights via bribes and/or through connections to prominent Ustaše. The whole process was highly arbitrary. Only 2% of Zagreb's Jews were granted Aryan rights, for example. Also, Aryan rights did not guarantee permanent protection from being sent to concentration camps or other persecution.

=== Views on Muslims ===
Islam, which had a large following in Bosnia and Herzegovina, was praised by the Ustaše as the religion that "keeps true the blood of Croats." The Ustaše viewed the Bosniaks as "Muslim Croats", and as a result, they were not persecuted on the basis of race. However, Muslims were not free from Ustaše persecution and atrocities, even if they were not targeted on a religious or ethnic basis. The majority of Muslims preferred a return to autonomy under Habsburg rule and were reportedly either neutral or opposed to the Ustaše regime. Despite Pavelić’s promises of equality between Catholics and Muslims, many Muslims became dissatisfied with Croat rule. Muslims (Bosniaks) comprised approximately 12% of the civil service and armed forces of the NDH.

=== Other measures ===
Economically, the Ustaše supported the creation of a corporatist economy. The movement believed that natural rights existed to private property and ownership over small-scale means of production free from state control. Armed struggle, revenge and terrorism were glorified.

Decrees enacted by the regime formed the basis that allowed it to get rid of all unwanted employees in state and local government and in state enterprises, the "unwanted" being all Jews, Serbs and Yugoslav-oriented Croats who were all thrown out except for some deemed specifically needed by the government. This would leave a multitude of jobs to be filled by Ustašes and pro-Ustaše adherents and would lead to government jobs being filled by people with no professional qualifications. Dalmatian-American historian Jozo Tomasevich in War and Revolution in Yugoslavia: 1941–1945 remarks "never before in history had Croats been exposed to such legalized administrative, police and judicial brutality and abuse as during the Ustaša regime."

== History ==
=== Before World War II ===
During the 1920s, Ante Pavelić, a lawyer, politician and follower of Josip Frank's Pure Party of Rights, became the leading advocate for Croatian independence. In 1927, he secretly contacted Benito Mussolini, dictator of Italy and founder of fascism, to present his separatist ideas. Pavelić proposed an independent Greater Croatia covering the entire historical and ethnic area of the Croats. Historian Rory Yeomans claimed there were signs appearing as early as 1928 that Pavelić was considering the formation of a nationalist insurgency group.

In October 1928, after the assassination of leading Croatian politician Stjepan Radić, (Croatian Peasant Party President in the Yugoslav Assembly) by radical Montenegrin politician Puniša Račić, a youth group named the Croat Youth Movement was founded by Branimir Jelić at the University of Zagreb. A year later, Pavelić was invited by the 21-year-old Jelić into the organization as a junior member. A related movement, the Domobranski Pokret—which had been the name of the legal Croatian army in Austria-Hungary—began publication of Hrvatski Domobran, a newspaper dedicated to Croatian national matters. The Ustaše sent Hrvatski Domobran to the United States to garner support from Croatian-Americans. The organization around the Domobran tried to engage with and radicalize moderate Croats, using Radić's assassination to stir up emotions within the divided country. By 1929 two divergent Croatian political streams had formed: those who supported Pavelić's view that only violence could secure Croatia's national interests, and a much larger group supporting the Croatian Peasant Party, led then by Vladko Maček, successor to Stjepan Radić.

Various members of the Croatian Party of Rights contributed to the writing of the Domobran, until around Christmas 1928 when the newspaper was banned by authorities of the Kingdom of Serbs, Croats and Slovenes. In January 1929 the king banned all national parties, and the radical wing of the Party of Rights was exiled, including Pavelić, Jelić and Gustav Perčec. This group was later joined by several other Croatian exiles. On 22 March 1929, Zvonimir Pospišil, Mijo Babić, Marko Hranilović, and Matija Soldin murdered Toni Šlegel, the chief editor of newspaper Novosti from Zagreb and president of Jugoštampa, which was the beginning of the terrorist actions of Ustaše. Hranilović and Soldin were arrested and executed for the murder. On 20 April 1929 Pavelić and others co-signed a declaration in Sofia, Bulgaria, with members of the Macedonian National Committee, asserting that they would pursue "their legal activities for the establishment of human and national rights, political freedom and complete independence for both Croatia and Macedonia". The Court for the Preservation of the State in Belgrade sentenced Pavelić and Perčec to death on 17 July 1929.

The exiles started organizing support for their cause among the Croatian diaspora in Europe, as well as North and South America. In January 1932 they named their revolutionary organization "Ustaša". The Ustaše carried out terrorist acts intended to maximize damage to Yugoslavia. From their training camps in fascist Italy and Hungary, they planted time bombs on international trains bound for Yugoslavia, causing deaths and material damage. In November 1932 ten Ustaše, led by Andrija Artuković and supported by four local sympathizers, attacked a gendarme outpost at Brušani in the Lika/Velebit area, in an apparent attempt to intimidate the Yugoslav authorities. The incident has sometimes been termed the "Velebit uprising".

==== Assassination of King Alexander I ====
Universal Newsreel's film about the assassination of Alexander I in 1934

The Ustaše's most infamous terrorist act was carried out on 9 October 1934, when, working with the Internal Macedonian Revolutionary Organization (IMRO), they assassinated King Alexander I of Yugoslavia in Marseille, France. The perpetrator, Bulgarian revolutionary Vlado Chernozemski, was killed by French police. Three Ustaše members who had been waiting at different locations for the king—Mijo Kralj, Zvonimir Pospišil and Milan Rajić—were captured and sentenced to life imprisonment by a French court. Following the German invasion of France, the men were released from prison.

Ante Pavelić, along with Eugen Kvaternik and Ivan Perčević, were subsequently sentenced to death in absentia by a French court, as the real organizers of the plot. The Ustaše believed that the assassination of King Alexander had effectively "broken the backbone of Yugoslavia" and was their "most important achievement."

Soon after the assassination, all organizations related to the Ustaše as well as the Hrvatski Domobran, which continued as a civil organization, were banned throughout Europe. Under pressure from France, the Italian police arrested Pavelić and several Ustaše emigrants in October 1934. Pavelić was imprisoned in Turin and released in March 1936. After he met with Eugen Dido Kvaternik, he stated that assassination was "the only language Serbs understand". While in prison, Pavelić was informed of the 1935 election in Yugoslavia, when the coalition led by Croat Vladko Maček won. He stated that his victory was aided by the activity of Ustaše. By the mid-1930s, graffiti with the initials ŽAP meaning "Long live Ante Pavelić" (Croatian: Živio Ante Pavelić) had begun to appear on the streets of Zagreb. During the 1930s, a split developed between the "home" Ustaše members who stayed behind in Croatia and Bosnia to struggle against Yugoslavia and the "emigre" Ustaše who went abroad. Emigre Ustaše who had a much lower educational level were viewed as violent, ignorant and fanatical by the home Ustaše, who were in turn dismissed as "soft" by the emigres, seeing themselves as a "warrior-elite".

After March 1937, when Italy and Yugoslavia signed a pact of friendship, Ustaše and their activities had been banned. This attracted the attention of young Croats, especially university students, who became sympathizers or members. In 1936, the Yugoslav government offered amnesty to those Ustaše abroad provided they promised to renounce violence; many of the emigre faction accepted the amnesty. In the late 1930s, the Ustaše began infiltrating the para-military organizations of the Croat Peasant Party, the Croatian Defense Force and the Peasant Civil Party. At the University of Zagreb, an Ustaše-linked student group become the largest single student group by 1939. In February 1939 two returnees from detention, Mile Budak and Ivan Oršanić, became editors of the pro-Ustaše journal Hrvatski narod, known in English as The Croatian Nation.

=== World War II ===
The Axis powers invaded Yugoslavia on 6 April 1941. Vladko Maček, the leader of the Croatian Peasant Party (HSS), which was the most influential party in Croatia at the time, rejected German offers to lead the new government. On 10 April the most senior home-based Ustaše, Slavko Kvaternik, took control of the police in Zagreb and in a radio broadcast that day proclaimed the formation of the Independent State of Croatia (Nezavisna Država Hrvatska, NDH). The name of the state was an attempt to capitalise on the Croat struggle for independence. Maček issued a statement that day, calling on all Croatians to cooperate with the new authorities.

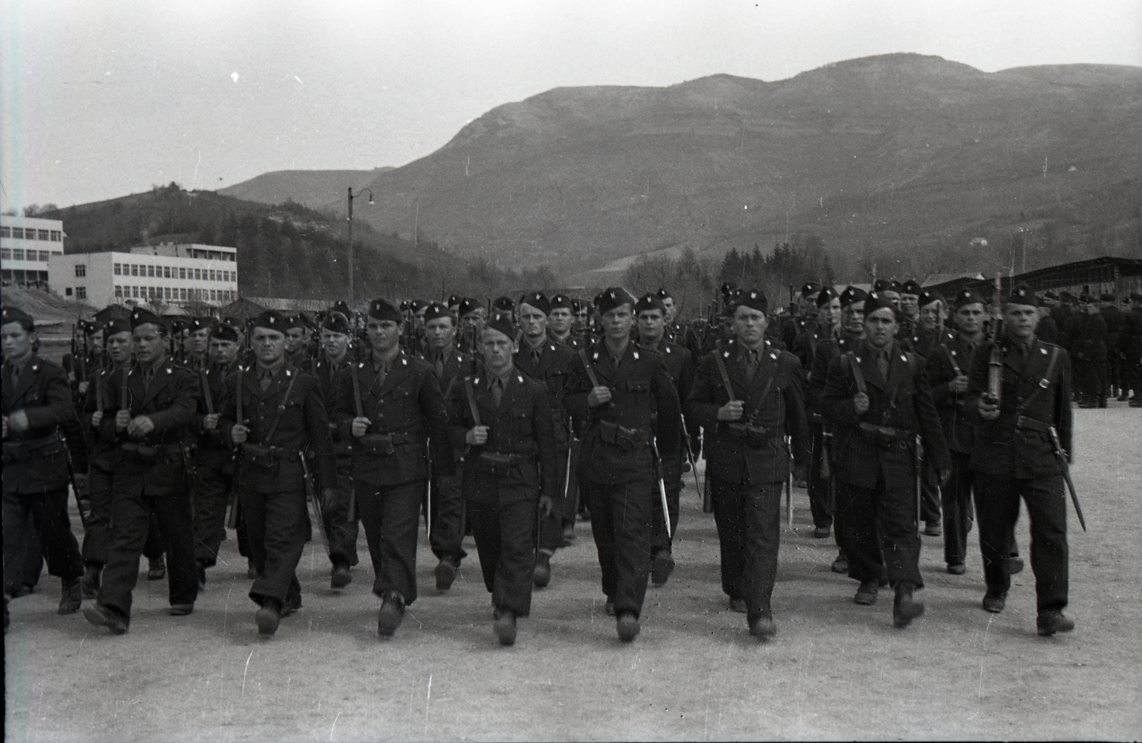
A unit of Ustaše in Sarajevo, 1942

Meanwhile, Pavelić and several hundred Ustaše left their camps in Italy for Zagreb, where he declared a new government on 16 April 1941. He accorded himself the title of "Poglavnik"—a Croatian approximation to "Führer". The Independent State of Croatia was declared on Croatian "ethnic and historical territory", what is today Republic of Croatia (without Istria), Bosnia and Herzegovina, Syrmia and the Bay of Kotor. However, a few days after the declaration of independence, the Ustaše were forced to sign the Treaty of Rome where they surrendered part of Dalmatia and Krk, Rab, Korčula, Biograd, Šibenik, Split, Čiovo, Šolta, Mljet and part of Konavle and the Bay of Kotor to Italy. De facto control over this territory varied over the course of the war, as the Yugoslav Partisans grew more successful, while the Germans and Italians increasingly exercised direct control over areas of interest. The Germans and Italians split the NDH into two zones of influence: the southwest, controlled by the Italians, and the northeast, controlled by the Germans. As a result, the NDH has been described as "an Italian-German quasi-protectorate". In September 1943, after Italian capitulation, the NDH re-occupied the whole territory annexed by Italy through the Treaty of Rome.

The decline in support for the Ustaše regime among ethnic Croats of those initially for the government began with the ceding of Dalmatia, considered the heartland of the state, to Italy, and worsened with the internal lawlessness from Ustaše persecutions.

==== Ustaše militia ====
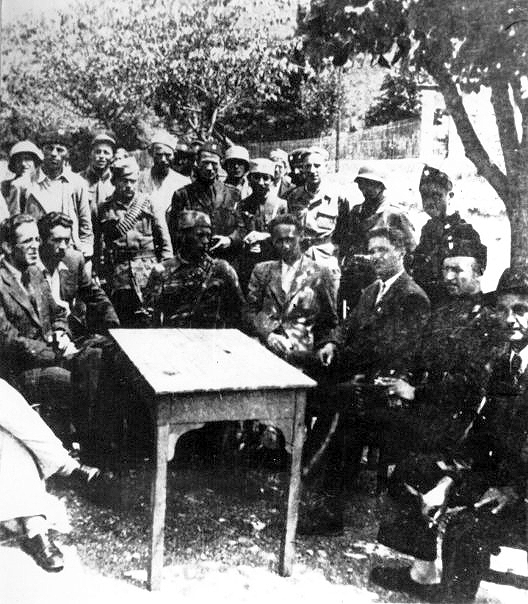
Meeting in Bosnia between representatives of the Chetniks and Independent State of Croatia officers (including the Ustaše militia and the Croatian Home Guard) between 1941 and 1945

The Army of the Independent State of Croatia was composed of enlistees who did not participate in Ustaše activities. The Ustaše Militia was organised in 1941 into five (later 15) 700-man battalions, two railway security battalions and the elite Black Legion and Poglavnik Bodyguard Battalion (later Brigade). They were predominantly recruited among uneducated population and working class.

On 27 April 1941 a newly formed unit of the Ustaše army killed members of the largely Serbian community of Gudovac, near Bjelovar. Eventually all who opposed and/or threatened the Ustaše were outlawed. The HSS was banned on 11 June 1941, in an attempt by the Ustaše to take their place as the primary representative of the Croatian peasantry. Vladko Maček was sent to the Jasenovac concentration camp, but later released to serve a house arrest sentence due to his popularity among the people. Maček was later again called upon by foreigners to take a stand and oppose the Pavelić government, but refused. In early 1941 Jews and Serbs were ordered to leave certain areas of Zagreb.

In the months after Independent State of Croatia has been established, most of Ustaše groups were not under centralized control: besides 4,500 regular Ustaše Corps troops, there was some 25,000–30,0000 "Wild Ustaše" (hrv. "divlje ustaše"), boosted by government-controlled press as "peasant Ustaše" "begging" to be sent to fight enemies of the regime. After mass crimes against Serb populace committed during the summer months of 1941, the regime decided to blame all the atrocities to the irregular Ustaše—thoroughly undisciplined and paid for the service only with the booty; authorities even sentenced to death and executed publicly in August and September 1941 many of them for unauthorized use of extreme violence against Serbs and Gypsies. To put an end to Wild Ustaše uncontrolled looting and killing, the central government used some 6,000 gendarmes and some 45,000 newly recruited members of regular "Domobranstvo" forces.

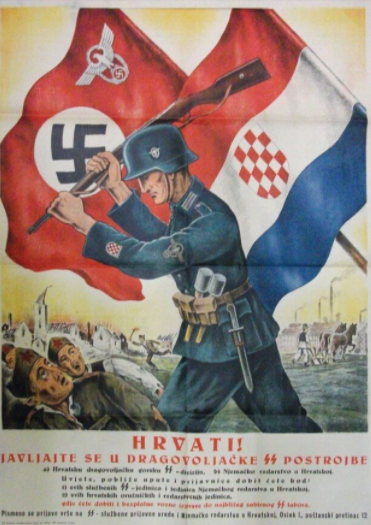
Nazi SS recruitment poster used in the NDH, 1943

Pavelić first met with Adolf Hitler on 6 June 1941. Mile Budak, then a minister in Pavelić's government, publicly proclaimed the violent racial policy of the state on 22 July 1941. Vjekoslav "Maks" Luburić, a chief of the secret police, started building concentration camps in the summer of the same year. Ustaše activities in villages across the Dinaric Alps led the Italians and the Germans to express their disquiet. According to writer/historian Srđa Trifković, as early as 10 July 1941 Wehrmacht Gen. Edmund Glaise von Horstenau reported the following to the German High Command, the Oberkommando der Wehrmacht (OKW):

Our troops have to be mute witnesses of such events; it does not reflect well on their otherwise high reputation. ... I am frequently told that German occupation troops would finally have to intervene against Ustaše crimes. This may happen eventually. Right now, with the available forces, I could not ask for such action. Ad hoc intervention in individual cases could make the German Army look responsible for countless crimes which it could not prevent in the past.

Historian Jonathan Steinberg describes Ustaše crimes against Serbian and Jewish civilians: "Serbian and Jewish men, women and children were literally hacked to death". Reflecting on the photos of Ustaše crimes taken by Italians, Steinberg writes: "There are photographs of Serbian women with breasts hacked off by pocket knives, men with eyes gouged out, emasculated and mutilated".

A Gestapo report to Reichsführer SS Heinrich Himmler, dated 17 February 1942, stated:

Increased activity of the bands [of rebels] is chiefly due to atrocities carried out by Ustaše units in Croatia against the Orthodox population. The Ustaše committed their deeds in a bestial manner not only against males of conscript age, but especially against helpless old people, women and children. The number of the Orthodox that the Ustaše have massacred and sadistically tortured to death is about three hundred thousand.

In September 1942 an Ustaše Defensive Brigade was formed, and during 1943 the Ustaše battalions were re-organised into eight four-battalion brigades (1st to 8th). In 1943 the Germans suffered major losses on the Eastern Front and the Italians signed an armistice with the Allies, leaving behind significant caches of arms which the Partisans would use.

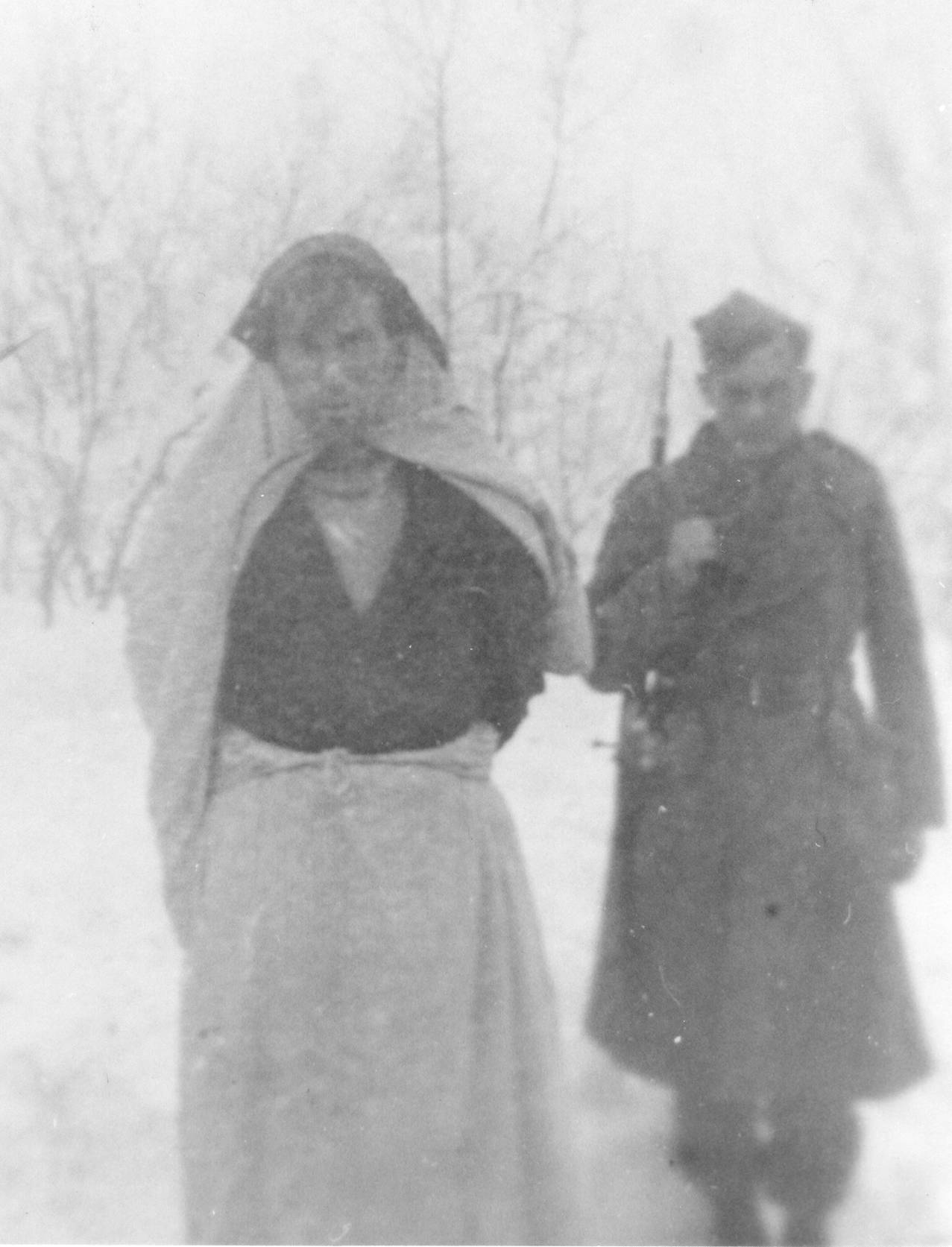
An Ustaša disguised as a woman, captured by Partisans of the 6th Krajina Brigade, 1945

By 1944 Pavelić was almost totally reliant on Ustaše units, now 100,000 strong, formed in Brigades 1 to 20, Recruit Training Brigades 21 to 24, three divisions, two railway brigades, one defensive brigade and the new Mobile Brigade. In November 1944 the army was effectively put under Ustaše control when the Armed Forces of the Independent State of Croatia were combined with the units of the Ustaše to form 18 divisions, comprising 13 infantry, two mountain and two assault divisions and one replacement division, each with its own organic artillery and other support units. There were several armored units.

Fighting continued for a short while after the formal surrender of German Army Group E on 9 May 1945, as Pavelić ordered the NDH forces to attempt to escape to Austria, together with a large number of civilians. The Battle of Poljana, between a mixed German and Ustaše column and a Partisan force, was the last battle of World War II on European soil. Most of those fleeing, including both Ustaše and civilians, were handed over to the Partisans at Bleiburg and elsewhere on the Austrian border. Pavelić hid in Austria and Rome, with the help of Catholic clergy, later fleeing to Argentina.

=== After the war ===
After World War II, many of the Ustaše went underground or fled to countries such as Canada, Australia, Germany and some countries in South America, notably Argentina, with the assistance of Roman Catholic churches and their own grassroots supporters.

For several years some Ustaše tried to organize a resistance group called the Crusaders, but their efforts were largely foiled by the Yugoslav authorities. With the defeat of the Independent State of Croatia, the active movement went dormant. Infighting fragmented the surviving Ustaše. Pavelić formed the Croatian Liberation Movement, which drew in several of the former state's leaders. Vjekoslav Vrančić founded a reformed Croatian Liberation Movement and was its leader. Maks Luburić formed the Croatian National Resistance. Branimir Jelić founded the Croatian National Committee. Former Crusader and Ustaša mobile police officer, Srecko Rover, helped establish Ustaše groups in Australia.

Blagoje Jovović, a Montenegrin, shot Pavelić near Buenos Aires on 9 April 1957; Pavelić later died of his injuries.

== Ethnic and religious persecution ==
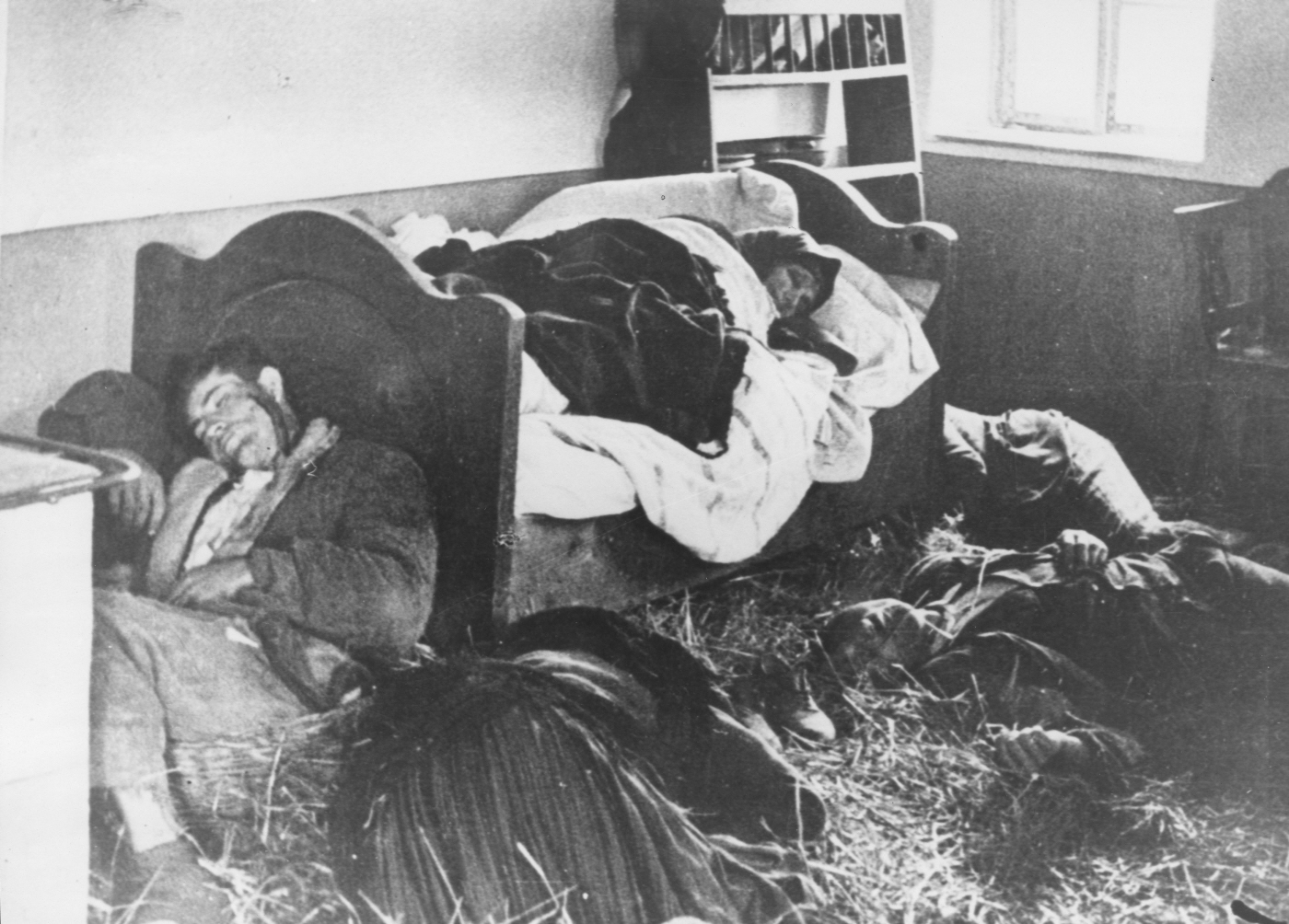
An entire Serb family lies slaughtered in their home following a raid by the Ustaše militia, 1941.

The Ustaše intended to create an ethnically "pure" Croatia, and they viewed the Serbs living in Croatia, Bosnia and Herzegovina as the biggest obstacle to this goal. Ustaše ministers Mile Budak, Mirko Puk and Milovan Žanić declared in May 1941 that the goal of the new Ustaše policy was an ethnically pure Croatia. The strategy to achieve their goal was:

1. One third of the Serbs were to be killed
2. One third of the Serbs were to be expelled
3. One third of the Serbs were to be forcibly converted to Catholicism

The NDH government cooperated with Nazi Germany in the Holocaust and exercised their own version of the genocide against Serbs, Jews and Roma inside its borders. State policy towards Serbs had first been declared in the words of Milovan Žanić, a minister of the NDH Legislative council, on 2 May 1941:

This country can only be a Croatian country, and there is no method we would hesitate to use in order to make it truly Croatian and cleanse it of Serbs, who have for centuries endangered us and who will endanger us again if they are given the opportunity.

The Ustaše enacted race laws patterned after those of the Third Reich, which persecuted Jews, Romani and Serbs, who were collectively declared to be enemies of the Croatian people. Serbs, Jews, Roma and Croatian and Bosniak dissidents, including Communists, were interned in concentration camps, the largest of which was Jasenovac. By the end of the war the Ustaše, under Pavelić's leadership, had killed an estimated 30,000 Jews and 26,000–29,000 Roma, while estimates of Serb victims range from 200,000 to 500,000, with historians generally listing between 300,000 and 350,000 deaths.

The history textbooks in the Socialist Federal Republic of Yugoslavia cited 700,000 as the total number of victims at Jasenovac. This was promulgated from a 1946 calculation of the demographic loss of population (the difference between the actual number of people after the war and the number that would have been, had the pre-war growth trend continued). After that, it was used by Edvard Kardelj and Moša Pijade in the Yugoslav war reparations claim sent to Germany. In its entry on Jasenovac, the United States Holocaust Memorial Museum says:

Determining the number of victims is highly problematic, due to the destruction of many relevant documents, the long-term inaccessibility to independent scholars of those documents that survived, and the ideological agendas of postwar partisan scholarship and journalism, which has been and remains influenced by ethnic tension, religious prejudice, and ideological conflict. The Ustaše murdered between 320,000 and 340,000 ethnic Serb residents of Croatia and Bosnia during the period of Ustaša rule; more than 30,000 Croatian Jews were killed either in Croatia or at Auschwitz-Birkenau.

The USHMM notes that estimates on the number of Serb victims, the Ustaše's primary victims, vary tremendously but "the most reliable figures place the number between 330,000 and 390,000, with 45,000 to 52,000 Serbs murdered in Jasenovac."

The Jasenovac Memorial Area maintains a list of 83,145 names of Jasenovac victims gathered by government officials in Belgrade in 1964, as well as names and biographical data for the victims identified in recent inquiries. As the gathering process was imperfect, they estimated that the list represented between 60%–75% of the total victims, putting the number of killed in that complex at roughly 80,000–100,000. The previous head of the Memorial Area, Simo Brdar, estimated at least 365,000 dead at Jasenovac. The analyses of statisticians Vladimir Žerjavić and Bogoljub Kočović were similar to those of the Memorial Area. In all of Yugoslavia, the estimated number of Serb deaths was 487,000 according to Kočović, and 530,000 according to Žerjavić, out of a total of 1.014 million or 1.027 million deaths (respectively). Žerjavić further stated there were 197,000 Serb civilians killed in NDH (78,000 as prisoners in Jasenovac and elsewhere) as well as 125,000 Serb combatants.

The Belgrade Museum of Holocaust compiled a list of over 77,000 names of Jasenovac victims. It was previously headed by Milan Bulajić, who supported the claim of a total of 700,000 victims. The current administration of the museum has further expanded the list to include slightly over 80,000 names. During World War II various German military commanders and civilian authorities gave different figures for the number of Serbs, Jews and others killed inside the territory of the Independent State of Croatia. Historian Prof. Jozo Tomasevich has posited that some of these figures may have been a "deliberate exaggeration" fostered to create further hostility between Serbs and Croats so that they would not unite in resisting the Axis. These figures included 400,000 Serbs (Alexander Löhr); 500,000 Serbs (Lothar Rendulic); 250,000 to March 1943 (Edmund Glaise von Horstenau); more than "3/4 of a million Serbs" (Hermann Neubacher) in 1943; 600,000–700,000 in concentration camps until March 1944 (Ernst Fick); 700,000 (Massenbach).

=== Concentration camps ===
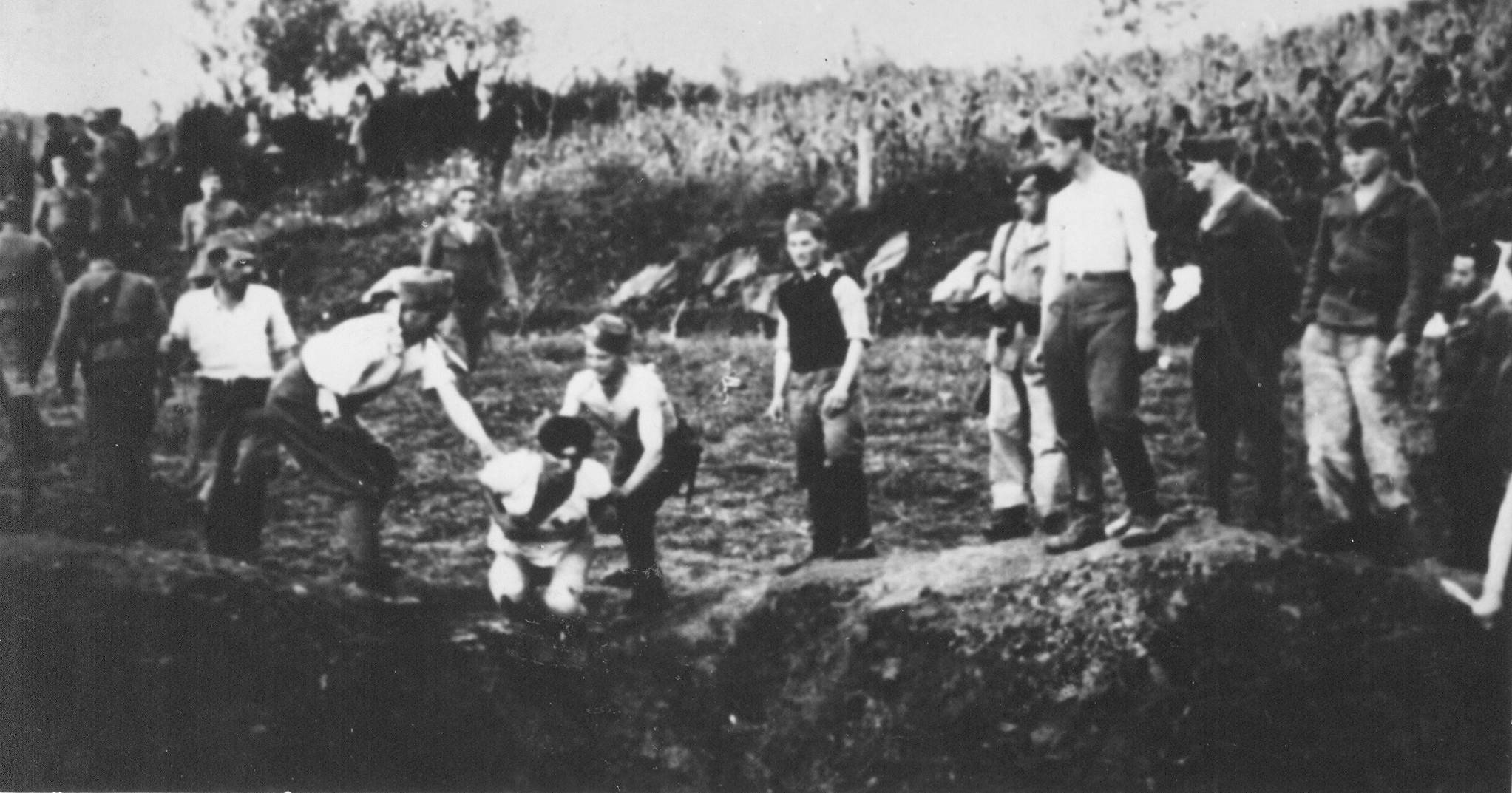
Ustaše militia execute prisoners near the Jasenovac concentration camp between 1942 and 1943.

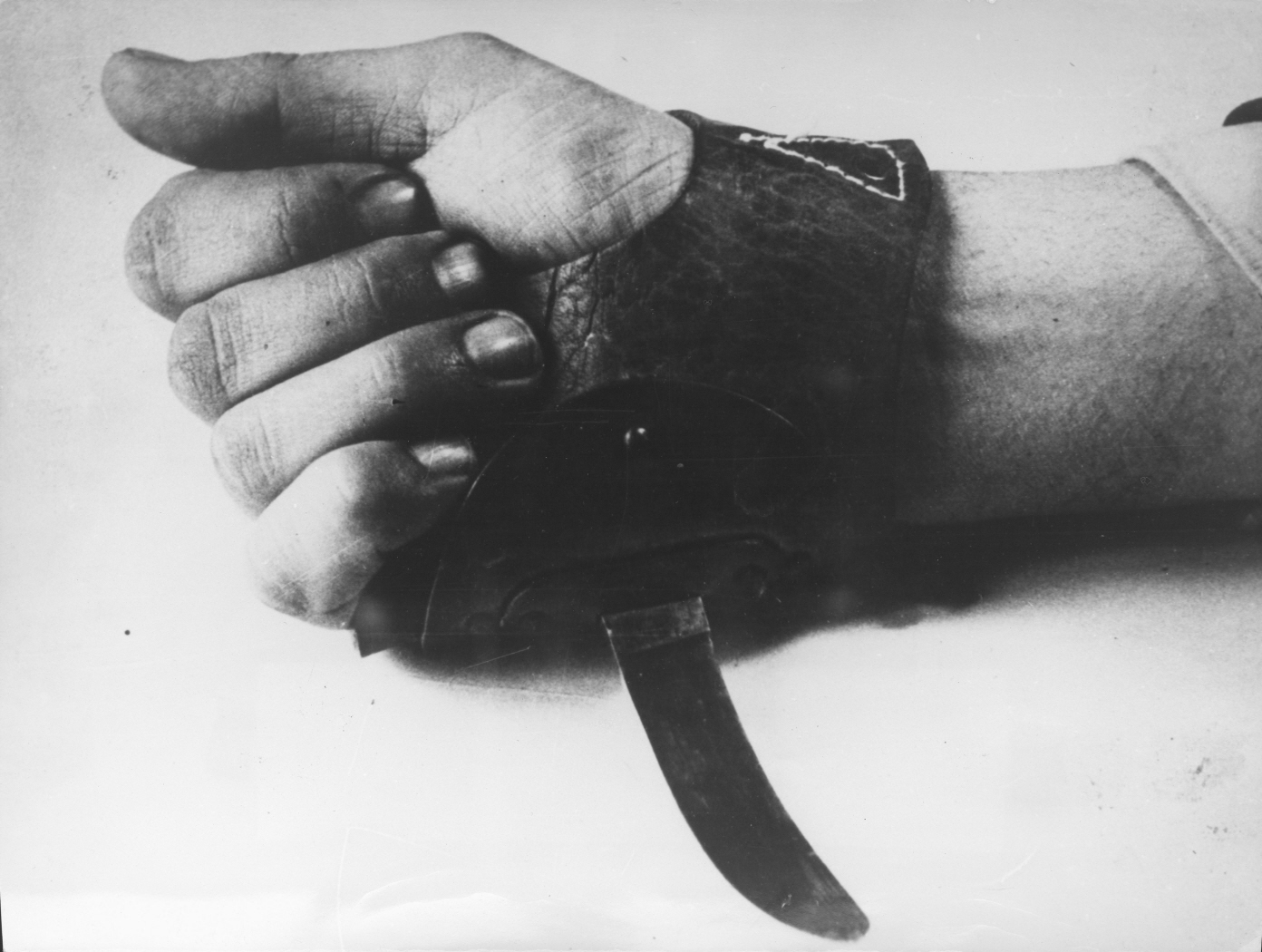
A knife, nicknamed "Srbosjek" or "Serbcutter", strapped to the hand, which was used in the 1940s by the Ustaše militia for the speedy killing of inmates in Jasenovac

The first group of camps was formed in the spring of 1941. These included:

- Danica near Koprivnica
- Slana and Metajna on the Island of Pag
- Jadovno near Gospić
- Kruščica near Vitez and Travnik in Bosnia
- Đakovo
- Loborgrad in Zagorje
- Tenja near Osijek

These camps were closed by October 1942. The Jasenovac complex was built between August 1941 and February 1942. The first two camps, Krapje and Bročica, were closed in November 1941. The three newer camps continued to function until the end of the war:

- Ciglana (Jasenovac III)
- Kozara (Jasenovac IV)
- Stara Gradiška (Jasenovac V) – concentration camp for women and children

There were also other camps in:

- Sisak concentration camp
- Jastrebarsko Children's Concentration Camp
- Gospić
- Kerestinec prison near Zagreb
- Lepoglava near Varaždin

Numbers of prisoners:

- between 300,000 and 350,000 up to 700,000 in Jasenovac (disputed)
- around 35,000 in Gospić
- around 8,500 in Pag
- around 3,000 in Đakovo
- 1,018 in Jastrebarsko
- around 1,000 in Lepoglava

=== Massacres of Serb civilians ===
Beyond mass killings in concentration camps, the Ustaše perpetrated many massacres of civilians in the field. The first mass killing of Serbs was carried out on 30 April 1941, when the Ustaše rounded up and killed 196 Serb villagers at Gudovac. Many other massacres soon followed, including at Blagaj, Glina, Korita, Nevesinje, Prebilovci, Metkovic, Otočac, Vočin, Šargovac, etc. Croatian Catholic Bishop of Mostar, Alojzije Mišić, described mass killings of Serb civilians in one small area of Herzegovina during the first six months of the war:

People were captured like beasts. Slaughtered, killed, thrown live into the abyss. Women, mothers with children, young women, girls and boys were thrown into pits. The vice-mayor of Mostar, Mr. Baljić, a Mohammedan, publicly states, although as an official he should be silent and not talk, that in Ljubinje alone 700 schismatics [i.e. Serb Orthodox Christians] were thrown into one pit. Six full train carriages of women, mothers and girls, children under age 10, were taken from Mostar and Čapljina to the Šurmanci station, where they were unloaded and taken into the hills, with live mothers and their children tossed down the cliffs. Everyone was tossed and killed. In the Klepci parish, from the surrounding villages, 3,700 schismatics were killed. Poor souls, they were calm. I will not enumerate further. I would go too far. In the city of Mostar, hundreds were tied up, taken outside the city and killed like animals.

==== German accounts of Ustaše massacres ====
German officers in Croatia and Bosnia repeatedly expressed abhorrence at Ustaše mass killings of Serbs, using words like "slaughter", "atrocities", "butchery" and "terror", while citing hundreds of thousands of victims. Major Walter Kleinenberger, officer with the 714th division, complained Ustaše brutality "was in defiance of all laws of civilization. The Ustaše murder without exception men, women and children". German Captain Konopatzki called the slaughter of Serb civilians in Eastern Bosnia by the Ustaše Black Legion "a new wave of butchery of innocents". Ustaše "wholesale butchery" (Abschlachtung) of Serbs in Srem, in ISC-occupied Serbia, triggered German concerns of Serb uprisings. Lieutenant Colonel von Wedel wrote that in western Bosnia Ustaše killed women and children "like cattle" in a series of "bestial executions". Hitler's Plenipotentiary to Croatia, General von Horstanau, described the aftermath of slaughter committed by Jasenovac concentration camp guards in a nearby village:

At Crkveni Bok, an unfortunate place, over which about five hundred 15- to 20-year-old thugs descended under the leadership of an Ustasha lieutenant colonel, people were killed everywhere, women were raped and then tortured to death, children were killed. I saw in the Sava River the corpse of a young woman with her eyes dug out and a stake driven into her sexual parts. This woman was at most twenty years old when she fell into the hands of these monsters. All around, pigs devoured unburied human beings. "Fortunate" residents were shipped in terrifying freight cars; many of these involuntary "passengers" cut their veins during transport to the camp [Jasenovac].

The German military even took the extraordinary step of trying the Ustaše chaplain, Miroslav Filipović, for the massacre of 2,300 civilians in three villages around Banja Luka in February 1942, including 52 children at a school. On 3 March, 1943, General von Horstanau, wrote "Thus far 250,000 Serbs have been killed". General Lothar Rendulić wrote how in August 1942 he remarked to an Ustaše official that he could not conceive how 500,000 Serbs had been killed, to which the Ustaše replied "Half-a-million is a slanderous accusation, the number is not higher than 200,000". Other German sources put the total Serb victim numbers in the ISC as high as 600,000 to 700,000.

=== Religious persecution ===
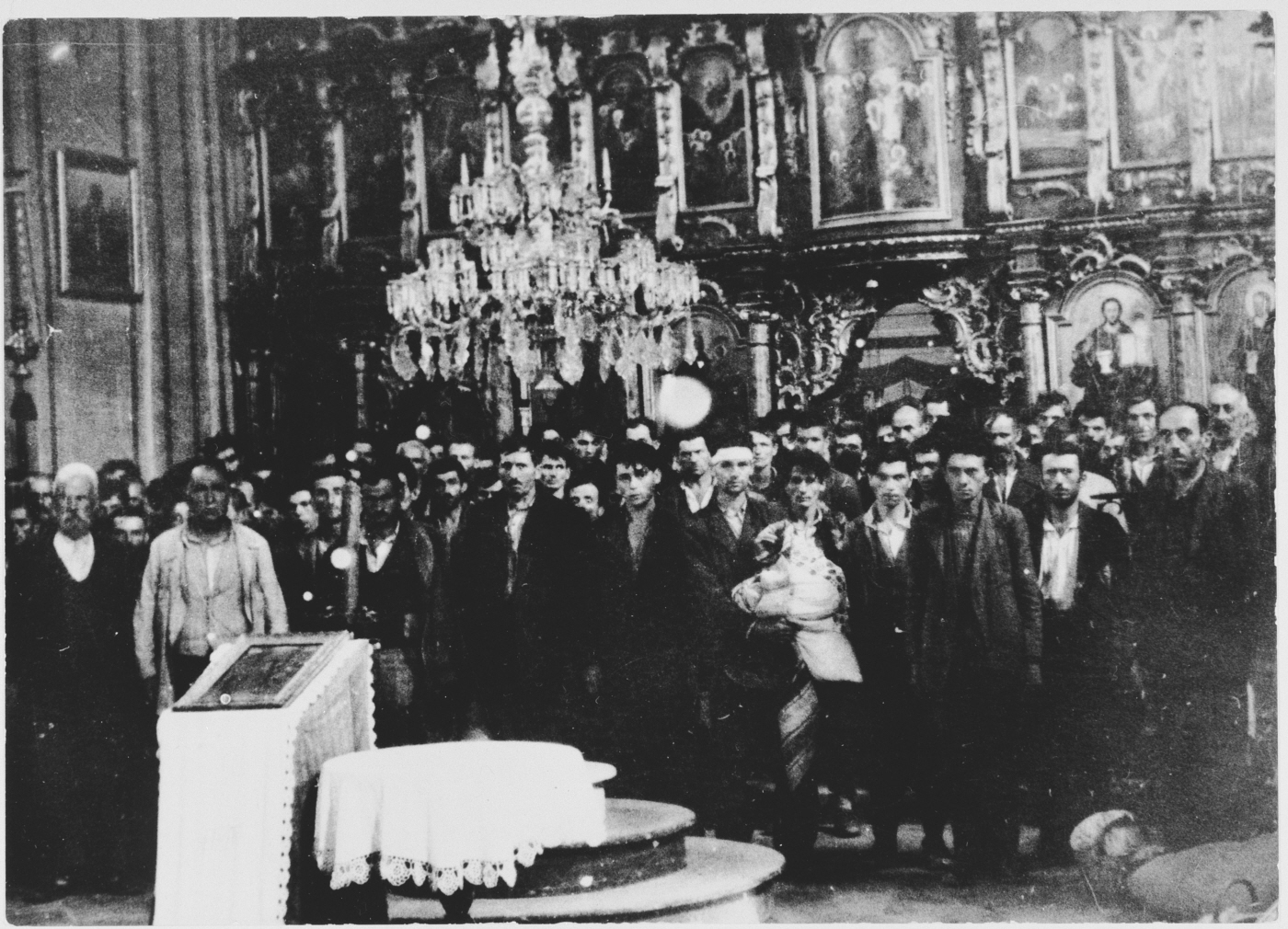
Serb civilians forced to convert to Catholicism by the Ustaše in Glina, 1941

As part of their policy to eliminate Serbs entirely from the NDH, by killing one-third, converting one-third and expelling one-third (although, in reality, by 1945 far more had been murdered than either converted or expelled), the Ustaše conducted forcible conversions of Christian Orthodox Serbs to Catholicism, with the participation of Catholic priests. On occasion, the prospect of conversion was merely a ruse to gather Serbs so they could be murdered, such as in Glina. On 18 May 1943, Archbishop Stepinac wrote a letter to the pope, in which he estimated 240,000 conversions had occurred. The Ustaše killed 157 Orthodox priests, among them three Serb Orthodox bishops (cutting the throat of the bishop of Banja Luka and killing the archbishop of Sarajevo), while they jailed and tortured the Orthodox archbishop of Zagreb. The Ustaše expelled to Serbia 327 Orthodox priests and one bishop, while two other bishops and 12 priests left on their own. According to NDH laws only uneducated Serbs were eligible for conversion; educated people, including merchants, intelligentia, and particularly Orthodox clergy were to be exterminated or expelled.

Thus 85% of the Orthodox priests in the Independent State of Croatia were either killed or expelled to "leave the Orthodox population without spiritual leadership so the Ustašas' policy of forced or fear-induced conversions to Catholicism would be easier to carry out". The Ustaše destroyed and desecrated numerous Orthodox churches, forbade the use of Cyrillic script and the Julian calendar (both officially used by the Serbian Orthodox Church) and even prohibited the term "Serbian Orthodox Church". Orthodox schools were shut down, and the Church was prohibited from collecting donations, robbing it of income. Church properties were confiscated, some were turned over to the Croatian Catholic Church. Finally, to destroy the Serbian Orthodox Church, the Ustaše tried to create its own alternative Croatian Orthodox Church, with an imported Russian hieromonk, Germogen Maximov, reigning as "patriarch", but it failed to gain adherents.

Despite the actions by the Ustaše to destroy the Serbian Orthodox Church, historian Josip "Jozo" Tomasevich found no condemnations of these crimes, public or private, by Catholic Archbishop Stepinac or any other members of the Croatian Catholic Church. On the contrary, he states that this massive Ustaše attack on the Serbian Orthodox Church "was approved and supported by many Croatian Catholic priests", and that the Croatian Roman Catholic Church hierarchy and the Vatican "regarded Ustaše policies against the Serbs and Serbian Orthodox Church as advantageous to Roman Catholicism".

== Connections with the Catholic Church ==
The historian Mark Biondich observes that the Catholic Church had historically been on the fringes of Croatian politics and public life, and that Church influence had further eroded during the interwar period due to the royal dictatorship and the popularity of the anti-clerical Croatian Peasant Party. During the Kingdom of Yugoslavia, the Catholic Clergy was deeply dissatisfied with the regime: "... a massive press campaign was launched to mobilize Croatia's nearly three million Catholics against the central government's measures penalizing Saint Peter's apostolate. First of all its inequality in treatment was denounced: 'the budget for religion totals 141 million dinars, 70 of which go to the Serbian Church, and 34 to the Catholic one.(...) Pašić's government is kind in Serbia, where each citizen pays 55 dinars in yearly taxes, while it is cruel in Croatia and Slovenia, largely Catholic districts, where each citizen pays 165 dinars in taxes.'"

Croatian Catholic Church antagonism toward the Orthodox Church became an important part of Ustaše antagonism toward Serbs, with fateful consequences during the war. The Ustaše supported violent aggression or force to convert Serbo-Croatian speaking Orthodox believers to Roman Catholicism. The Ustaše held the position that Eastern Orthodoxy, as a symbol of Serbian nationalism, was their greatest foe and never recognized the existence of a Serb people on the territories of Croatia or Bosnia—they recognized only "Croats of the Eastern faith". Under the Ustaše policy of eliminating Serbs, the Catholic Church in Croatia participated in the forced conversion of Orthodox Serbs to Catholicism. However, even conversion did not necessarily protect Serbs and Jews from slaughter. Bishop Alojzije Mišić of Mostar described how while Serb converts to Catholicism "were at Church attending holy Mass, they (Ustaše) seized them, the young and the old, men and women, drove them like cattle...and soon sent them to eternity, en masse."

The Ustaše called Bosniaks "Croats of the Islamic faith" and in general tolerated Muslims; in turn the Bosniak community did not demonstrate any particular hostility to the Ustaše government. Many Muslim conscripts served in the armed forces of Independent State of Croatia and its police forces; only a very small number of Muslims served in the ranks of the communist Partisans until the closing days of the war. The October 12, 1941, Resolution of Sarajevo Muslims by 108 notable Muslims condemned Ustaše atrocities against Serbs.

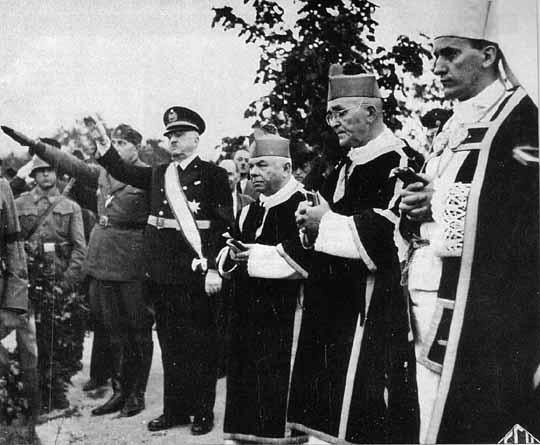
Marko Došen (far left, giving Nazi salute) and Archbishop Alojzije Stepinac (far right) in 1944

On 28 April 1941, the head of the Catholic Church in Croatia, Archbishop Alojzije Stepinac, issued a public letter in support of the new Ustaše-led Independent State of Croatia and asked the clergy to pray for Pavelić. This despite the fact that the Ustaše had already proclaimed measures prohibiting Serbs, Jews and Roma to serve as policemen, judges and soldiers, and making easy for the state officials to fire members of those ethnic/religious groups from the public administration, and he knew they were preparing Nazi-style racial laws, which Pavelić signed only two days after.

While Stepinac later objected to certain Ustaše policies and helped some Jews and Serbs, he continued to publicly support the survival of Independent State of Croatia until its very end, served as the state's War Vicar, and in 1944 received a medal from Pavelić. During the ongoing war, Stepinac publicly objected to Ustaše policies—in fact, as regards for the relations with head of the Ustaše regime Ante Pavelić, "it is generally agreed that they thoroughly hated each other... archbishop also opposed Fascist and Nazi ideologies, especially Nazi racist ideology, and many Ustasha policies", unlike some other members of the Croatian Catholic clergy. According to Historian Martin Gilbert, "Aloysius Stepinac, who in 1941 had welcomed Croat independence, subsequently condemned Croat atrocities against both Serbs and Jews, and himself saved a group of Jews in an old age home."

The vast majority of Catholic clergy in Croatia supported the Ustaše at the moment they succeeded in forming Independent State of Croatia; but later when it was clear the Allies would win, the Catholic hierarchy tried to distance the Church from the regime and its war crimes. Yet in its pastoral letter of 24 March 1945, the Croatian Catholic Church still proclaimed its support for the puppet state and its rulers, despite the fact that most senior regime figures were preparing to flee the country. The Catholic press also maintained its support of Pavelić right to the end, and Stepinac himself performed a final Te Deum to the NDH on the anniversary of its founding, on 10 April 1945, while the NDH was carrying out the final mass killings to liquidate the Jasenovac concentration camp.

Some priests, mostly Franciscans, particularly in, but not limited to, Herzegovina and Bosnia, took part in the atrocities themselves. Priests like Ivan Guberina served as Pavelić's bodyguards, while Dionizije Juričev, responsible for the forced conversion of Serbs in the Ustaše government, wrote that it was no longer a crime to kill seven-year-olds if they stood in the way of the Ustaše movement. In his diocesan newspaper, the Archbishop of Sarajevo, Ivan Šarić, published that the "liberation of the world from the Jews is a movement for the renewal of humanity". In Bosnia the Ustaše largely ruled through the Catholic clergy, with the priest Božidar Bralo serving as a chief Ustaše delegate for Bosnia.

Miroslav Filipović was a Franciscan friar (from the Petrićevac monastery) who allegedly joined the Ustaše as chaplain and, on 7 February 1942, joined in the massacre of roughly 2730 Serbs of the nearby villages, including some 500 children. He was allegedly subsequently dismissed from his order and defrocked, although he wore his clerical garb when he was hanged for war crimes. He became Chief Guard of Jasenovac concentration camp where he was nicknamed "Fra Sotona" (Friar Satan) by fellow Croats. Mladen Lorković, the Croat minister of foreign affairs, formulated it like this: "In Croatia, we can find few real Serbs. The majority of Pravoslavs [i.e. Orthodox Christians] are as a matter of fact Croats who were forced by foreign invaders to accept the infidel faith. Now it's our duty to bring them back into the Roman Catholic fold."

For the duration of the war, "in accordance with Vatican's long-term diplomatic practice of not recognizing new states in wartime before they were legitimized by peace treaties, the pope did not send a nuncio or diplomat to Croatia as requested, but an apostolic visitor, the abbot Giuseppe Marcone, who was to represent the Vatican to Croatian Catholic Church, not to the government. The government ignored this nuance, bestowing a prominent place for Marcone at all official functions". After World War II ended, the Ustaše who had managed to escape from Yugoslav territory (including Pavelić) were smuggled to South America. This was largely done through ratlines operated by Catholic priests who had previously secured positions at the Vatican. Some of the more infamous members of the Illyrian College of San Girolamo in Rome involved in this were Franciscan friars Krunoslav Draganović and Dominik Mandić, and a third friar surnamed Petranović (first name unknown).

The Ustaše regime had deposited large amounts of gold—including the gold plundered from Serbs and Jews during World War II—into Swiss bank accounts. It seems a substantial quantity of gold was additionally transported by Ustaše to Austria at the end of the WWII. Out of a total, by some estimates, of 350 million Swiss francs, an intelligence report estimated 200 million (ca. $47 million) reached the Vatican. The question remains unclarified.

Cardinal Alojzije Stepinac, Archbishop of Zagreb, was accused and sentenced to prison after the end of World War II by Yugoslav communist authorities of supporting the Ustaše and of exonerating those in the clergy who collaborated with them and were hence complicit in forced conversions. Stepinac stated on 28 March 1941, noting early attempts to unite Croatians and Serbs:

"All in all, Croats and Serbs are of two worlds, northpole and southpole, never will they be able to get together unless by a miracle of God. The schism (between the Catholic Church and Eastern Orthodoxy) is the greatest curse in Europe, almost greater than Protestantism. There is no moral, no principles, no truth, no justice, no honesty."

On 22 July 2016, the Zagreb County Court annulled his post-war conviction due to "gross violations of current and former fundamental principles of substantive and procedural criminal law".

In 1998 Stepinac was beatified by Pope John Paul II. On 22 June 2003 John Paul II visited Banja Luka. During the visit he held a Mass at the aforementioned Petrićevac monastery. This caused public uproar due to the connection of the monastery with Filipović. At the same location the Pope proclaimed the beatification of a Roman Catholic layman Ivan Merz (1896–1928), who was the founder of the "Association of Croatian Eagles" in 1923, which some view as a precursor to the Ustaše. Roman Catholic apologists defend the Pope's actions by stating the convent at Petrićevac was one of the places that went up in flames, causing the death of 80-year-old Friar Alojzije Atlija. Further, it was claimed by the apologists that the war had produced "a total exodus of the Catholic population from this region"; that the few who remained were "predominantly elderly"; and that the church in Bosnia then allegedly risked "total extinction" due to the war.

== Ustaše-Chetnik collaboration ==
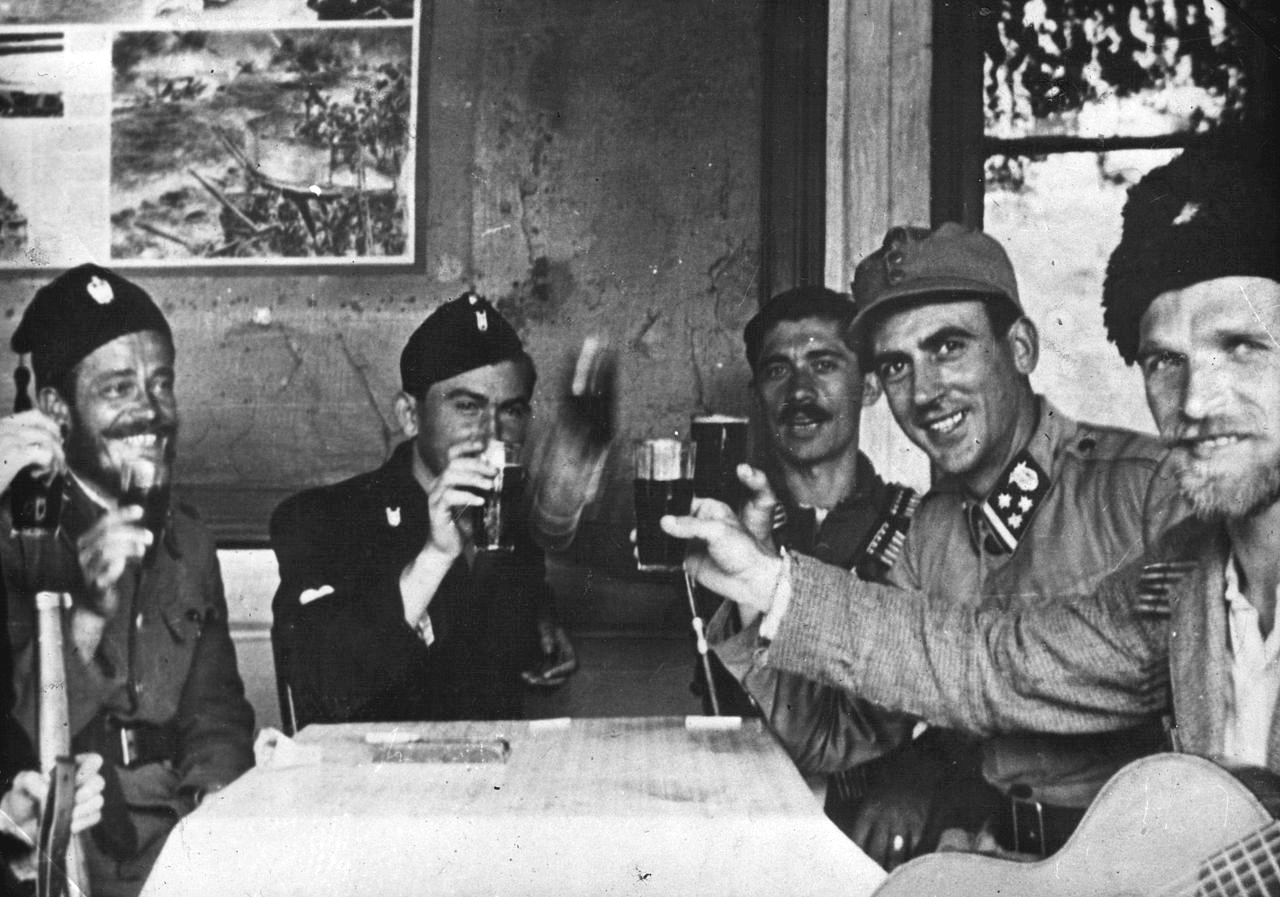
Ustaše and Domobran officers with the Chetnik commander Uroš Drenović (left), 1942

Despite representing opposing nationalisms, when confronted with the growing strength of their common enemy (i.e. the partisans), Ustaše and Chetniks throughout the Independent State of Croatia signed collaboration agreements in the spring of 1942, which for the most part held until the very end of the war. The introduction to these agreements stated:

As long as there is a danger of armed partisan gangs, Chetnik formations will voluntarily cooperate with the Croatian armed forces in fighting and destroying the partisans and will be under the command of the Croatian armed forces in these operations.

Beyond that, the agreements specified that the NDH military will supply Chetniks with arms and ammunition, Chetniks wounded in anti-partisan operations will be treated at NDH military hospitals, and widows and orphans of killed Chetnik soldiers, will receive state financial aid equal to aid received by widows and orphans of NDH soldiers. The NDH authorities arranged for Serbs in Ustaše concentration camps to be released, but only on the special recommendation of Chetnik commanders (thus, not partisans and their sympathizers). On 30 June 1942, the Chief Headquarters of the Poglavnik (i.e. Ante Pavelić), sent a statement, signed by Marshall Slavko Kvaternik, to other NDH ministries, summarizing these agreements with NDH Chetniks.

The Ustaše signed collaboration agreements with key NDH Chetnik commanders, in the following order:

- Momčilo Đujić (commander of Chetnik Dinara Division), Brane Bogunović (commander of Gavrilo Princip Corps, Dinara Division), Mane Rokvić (commander of King Alexander I Corps, Dinara Division), Pajica Omčikus (King Petar II Corps, Dinara Division) and Pajo Popović (commander of Onisin Popović Corps, Dinara Division) in December 1941 first started negotiations with the Ustaše mayor of Knin, David Sinčić, in Knin.
- Uroš Drenović, the commander of the Chetnik »Kočić« detachment, signed an agreement with the Ustaše in Mrkonjić Grad on 27. April, 1942.
- Lazar Tešanović, commander of the Chetnik battalion, »Mrkonjić«, signed an agreement with the NDH on 23. May, 1942.
- Cvijetin Todić and Savo Božić, commanders of the Chetnik Ozren and Trebava detachments, signed agreements with the NDH on 28. May 1942. in the village Lipac
- Representatives of the Majevica Chetnik detachment, signed agreements with the NDH on 30 May 1942.
- Rade Radić, commander of the Chetnik detachment, "Borja", reached agreement with the NDH authorities on 9 June 1942.
- Slavko Bjelajac and Jovan Dabović, Chetnik commanders from the Otočac area, signed agreements with the NDH on 17 December 1942.

On 26 May 1942, the Ustaše minister, Mladen Lorković, wrote in a communique to local NDH authorities, that pursuant to these agreements "Home Guard Headquarters agrees with your proposal to grant one million kuna aid to the leaders of the Greek-Eastern community [i.e. Serb Orthodox], Momčilo Djujić, Mane Rokvić, [Branko] Bogunović, Paja Popović and Paja Omčikus, 200 Yugoslav guns and 10 machine guns". Ustaše and Chetniks simultaneously participated, alongside German and Italian forces, in major battles against the Partisans in the NDH: the Kozara Offensive, Case White, Operation Rösselsprung, the Battle for Knin (1944), etc.

In 1945, the Chetnik commander, Momčilo Djujić and his troops, with Ustaše leader Ante Pavelić's permission, escaped across the NDH to the West. In April 1945, by his own admission, Ante Pavelić received "two generals from the headquarters Draža Mihailović and reached an agreement with them on a joint fight against Tito's communists", while in the first days of May, Chetnik units passed through Ustaše-held Zagreb, on their way to Bleiburg, after which Chetniks and members of the Ustaše army, were killed by the Partisans in various sites, including Tezno near Maribor.

== Structure ==
At the top of the command was the Poglavnik (meaning "head") Ante Pavelić. Pavelić was appointed the office as Head of State of Croatia after Adolf Hitler had accepted Benito Mussolini's proposal of Pavelić, on 10 April 1941. The Croatian Home Guard was the armed forces of Croatia, it subsequently merged into the Croatian Armed Forces. The Ustaše command structure was further broken down into administrations at a stožer (district), logor (country) and tabor (county) level.

== Symbols ==
Symbol used in the Independent State of Croatia

The symbol of the Ustaše was a capital blue letter "U" with an exploding grenade emblem within it.

The flag of the Independent State of Croatia was a red-white-blue horizontal tricolor with the shield of the coat of arms or Croatia in the middle and the U in the upper left. Its currency was the NDH kuna.

The Ustaše greeting was "Za dom – spremni!":

Salute: Za dom! For home(land)!
Reply: Spremni! (We are) ready!

This was used instead of the Nazi greeting Heil Hitler by the Ustaše. Today it is associated with Ustaše sympathisers. On the internet, it is sometimes abbreviated as ZDS.

The songs promoting the Ustaše included "Evo zore, evo dana", "Hrvatska se vojska diže", "Pjesma Poglavniku". "Evo zore, evo dana" (also called "Jure i Boban") promoted the Black Legion, and it was common for songs to have both a Partisan and a Ustaše version.

== Legacy ==
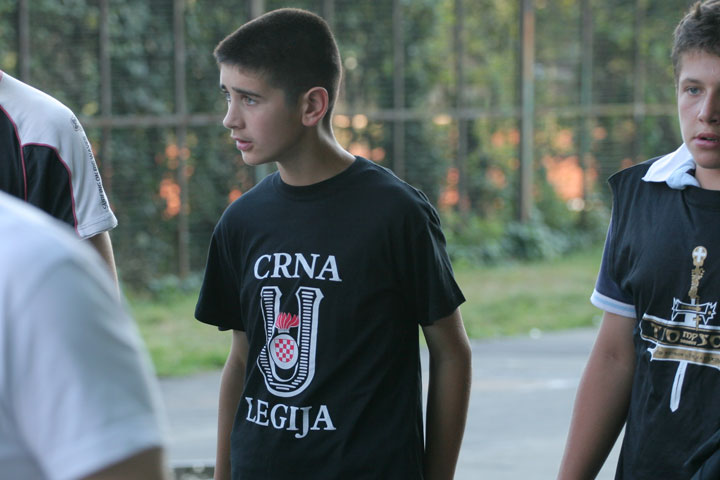
Young boy wearing a shirt with a Black Legion, Ustaše Militia sign at a Thompson concert

=== In popular culture ===
The Ustaše plays an important role in Harry Turtledove's short alternate history story Ready for the Fatherland. It plays a brief background role in In the Presence of Mine Enemies, an unrelated work by the same author. In both these works, the regime founded by Pavelić lasted several decades beyond the 1940s.

Popular Croatian singer Marko Perković Thompson regularly starts his concerts with the salute “Za Dom Spreni”, a salute infamously coined by the Ustaše. The Wiesenthal Center has protested this, along with other attempts at revisionism and Holocaust-denial in Croatia.

=== Propaganda before and during the Yugoslav Wars ===
Since the end of World War II, Serbian historians have used the Ustaše to promote that Serbs resisted the Axis, while Croats and Bosniaks widely supported them. However, the Ustaše lacked support among ordinary Croats and never accrued any significant support among the populace. The Ustaše regime was backed by parts of the Croatian population that during the interwar period had felt oppressed in the Serbian-led Yugoslavia. Most of the support it had initially gained by creating a Croat national state was lost because of the brutal practices it used.

In the 1980s, Serbian historians produced many works about the forced conversion during World War II of Serbs in Ustaše Croatia. These debates between historians openly became nationalistic and also entered the wider media. Historians in Belgrade during this time who had close government connections often went on television during the evenings to discuss real or invented details about the Ustaše genocide against Serbs during World War II. Serb clergy and nationalists blamed all Croats for crimes committed by the Ustaše, and for planning a repeat genocide against Serb people, referring to the Croatian people as “genocidal by nature”. These propagandistic activities were aimed at justifying planned crimes and ethno-demographic engineering in Croatia.

Some actions in the Socialist Republic of Croatia would further fuel such rhetoric. Seeking to unify support for Croatia's independence, Franjo Tuđman, Croatia's first president, in the late 1980s advocated "pomirba", i.e. national reconciliation between Ustaše and Partisans. This led to a revival of pro-Ustaše views, symbols and salutes among the Croatian political right. Following Croatia's Independence in the 1990s, streets were renamed to carry the name of Ustaše leaders, such as Mile Budak and Jure Francetić. Although some of these were later removed, Radio Free Europe noted that of some 20 streets dedicated to Mile Budak in the '90s, half still remained in Croatia in 2019.

=== Modern-day Croatia ===
Jewish and Serb organizations, Croat historians and antifascists, as well as international observers, have repeatedly warned of revisionism in Croatia, which seeks to minimize Ustaše crimes and even celebrates the Ustaše regime. Recent examples include the publication of a book celebrating "the Croatian knight" Maks Luburić, who as head of Ustaše concentration camps was responsible for over 100,000 deaths, during Ustaše genocides against Jews, Serbs and Roma, and a documentary minimizing children's deaths in Ustaše concentration camps. The Luburić book was promoted with the assistance of the Croatian Catholic Church, and Church sources minimized children's deaths in concentration camps. Croat historians have noted that the Church has been a leader in promoting revisionism and minimizing Ustaše crimes. In 2013, the newspaper of Croatian Catholic archdioceses, Glas Koncila, published a series on Jasenovac, by the Jasenovac-denier Igor Vukić, who claims Jasenovac was a "mere work-camp," where no mass executions took place. In 2015, the head of the Croatian Bishops' Conference asked that the Ustaše "Za dom spremni" salute be adopted by the Croatian army.

Croatian soccer fans have repeatedly chanted the Ustaše "Za dom spremni" salute, for which FIFA and UEFA have repeatedly leveled penalties against the Croatian soccer federation for fascist outbursts. In 2014, the Croatian soccer player Josip Šimunić was banned from the FIFA World Cup for leading a stadium full of fans in the Ustaše salute.

In 2014 the then-mayor of Split, Croatia, unveiled a monument dedicated to the 1990s HOS brigade named "The Knight Rafael Boban", after the Ustaše commander, which includes the HOS emblem with the Ustaše "Za dom spremni" salute. Since then the HOS organization has organized annual commemorations at the memorial on 10 April (the anniversary of the founding of the Independent State of Croatia), during which the black-uniformed participants shout the Ustaše "Za dom spremni" salute.

In 2016 the Croatian HOS war veterans' organization posted a plaque at Jasenovac concentration camp with the Ustaše "Za dom spremni" salute. Despite protests by Jewish and other organizations, this was allowed to remain until criticism by the U.S. State Department special envoy on Holocaust issues, forced the government to move it to a nearby town. As a result of this, and allegations of the government's tolerance for the minimization of Ustaše crimes, Jewish, Serb and Croat WWII resistance groups refused to appear with government representatives at the annual Jasenovac commemoration.

In 2019 the Austrian government passed a law forbidding the display of Ustaše symbols, along with previously banned Nazi symbols, largely as a result of the display of same by Croatian nationalists at the annual, Croatian government-sponsored Bleiburg commemoration, where Austrian police have repeatedly arrested Croat nationalists for Nazi and fascist salutes. Three Austrian EU parliamentarians declared the Bleiburg ceremony, which tens-of-thousands of Croat nationalists attend, "the largest fascist gathering in Europe." The Austrian Catholic Church banned a Mass by the Croatian Catholic Church at Bleiburg because, as they stated, "the Mass at Bleiburg has become part of a manifestation that is politically instrumentalised and is part of a political-national ritual that serves to selectively experience and interpret history," adding that it misuses "a religious service for political purposes while not distancing itself from the Fascist worldview."

== Bibliography ==
- Aleksov, Bojan (2007). "Adamant and treacherous: Serbian historians on religious conversions". In Washburn, Dennis; Reinhart, Kevin (eds.). Converting Cultures: Religion, Ideology and Transformations of Modernity. Brill. ISBN 978-90-04-15822-1.
- Baker, Catherine (2015). The Yugoslav Wars of the 1990s. Macmillan International Higher Education. ISBN 9781137398994.
- Bellamy, Alex J. (2013). The Formation of Croatian National Identity: A Centuries-Old Dream?. Manchester University Press. ISBN 9781847795731.
- Colić, Mladen (1973). Takozvana Nezavisna Država Hrvatska 1941. Delta-pres.
- Paris, Edmond (1961). Genocide in Satellite Croatia, 1941–1945: A Record of Racial and Religious Persecutions and Massacres. American Institute for Balkan Affairs.
- Aarons, Mark and Loftus, John: Unholy Trinity: How the Vatican's Nazi Networks Betrayed Western Intelligence to the Soviets. New York: St. Martin's Press, 1992. 372 pages; ISBN 978-0-312-07111-0.
- Krizman, Bogdan (1978). ANTE PAVELIĆ I USTAŠE. Globus. Archived from the original on 1 February 2026.
- Krizman, Bogdan (1980). PAVELIĆ IZMEĐU HITLERA I MUSSOLINIJA. Globus. Archived from the original on 30 January 2026.
- Krizman, Bogdan (1983). USTAŠE I TREĆI REICH – knjiga 1. Globus. Archived from the original on 25 February 2026.
- Krizman, Bogdan (1983). USTAŠE I TREĆI REICH – knjiga 2. Globus.
- Neubacher, Hermann. Sonderauftrag Suedost 1940–1945, Bericht eines fliegendes Diplomaten, 2. durchgesehene Auflage, Goettingen, 1956.
- Bulajić, Milan (1994). The Role of the Vatican in the break-up of the Yugoslav State: The Mission of the Vatican in the Independent State of Croatia. Ustashi Crimes of Genocide. Stručna knjiga.
- Bulajić, Milan (2002). Jasenovac: The Jewish-Serbian Holocaust (the role of the Vatican) in Nazi-Ustasha Croatia (1941–1945). Fund for Genocide Research, Stručna knjiga. ISBN 9788641902211.
- Goldstein, Ivo (2006). "Ante Pavelić, Charisma and National Mission in Wartime Croatia". Totalitarian Movements and Political Religions. 7 (2): 225–234. doi:10.1080/14690760600642289. S2CID 144163142.
- Goldstein, Ivo; Goldstein, Slavko (2016). The Holocaust in Croatia. University of Pittsburgh Press. ISBN 9780822944515.
- Lituchy, Barry M. (2006). Jasenovac and the Holocaust in Yugoslavia. Jasenovac Research Institute. ISBN 978-0-9753432-0-3.
- Matković, Hrvoje (2002). Povijest Nezavisne Države Hrvatske (in Croatian). Naklada Pavičić. ISBN 978-953-6308-39-2.
- McCormick, Robert B. (2014). Croatia Under Ante Pavelić: America, the Ustaše and Croatian Genocide. I.B. Tauris. ISBN 978-0-8577-2535-6.
- Pavlowitch, Stevan K. (2008). Hitler's New Disorder: The Second World War in Yugoslavia. Columbia University Press. ISBN 9780231700504.
- Phayer, Michael (2000). The Catholic Church and the Holocaust, 1930–1965. Indiana University Press. ISBN 978-0253214713.
- Srdja Trifkovic: Ustaša: Croatian Separatism and European Politics 1929–1945 Lord Byron Foundation for Balkan Studies, London, 1998.
- Encyclopedia of the Holocaust, Israel Gutman (editor-in-chief), Vol. 4, "Ustase" entry. Macmillan, 1990.
- Biondich, Mark (2007). "Controversies Surrounding the Catholic Church in Wartime Croatia, 1941–45". The Independent State of Croatia 1941–45. Routledge. pp. 31–59. ISBN 9780415440554.
- Biondich, Mark (2005). "Religion and Nation in Wartime Croatia: Reflections on the Ustaša Policy of Forced Religious Conversions, 1941–1942". The Slavonic and East European Review. 83 (1): 71–116. doi:10.1353/see.2005.0063. JSTOR 4214049. S2CID 151704526.
- Ramet, Sabrina P. (2006). The Three Yugoslavias: State-Building and Legitimation, 1918–2005. Indiana University Press. ISBN 978-0-253-34656-8. Archived from the original on 23 December 2024.
- Rivelli, Marco Aurelio (1998). Le génocide occulté: État Indépendant de Croatie 1941–1945 [Hidden Genocide: The Independent State of Croatia 1941–1945] (in French). L'age d'Homme. ISBN 9782825111529.
- Rivelli, Marco Aurelio (1999). L'arcivescovo del genocidio: Monsignor Stepinac, il Vaticano e la dittatura ustascia in Croazia, 1941–1945 [The Archbishop of Genocide: Monsignor Stepinac, the Vatican and the Ustaše dictatorship in Croatia, 1941–1945] (in Italian). Kaos. ISBN 9788879530798.
- Rivelli, Marco Aurelio (2002). "Dio è con noi!": La Chiesa di Pio XII complice del nazifascismo ["God is with us!": The Church of Pius XII accomplice to Nazi Fascism] (in Italian). Kaos. ISBN 9788879531047.
- Shepherd, Ben H. (2012). Terror in the Balkans: German Armies and Partisan Warfare. Cambridge: Harvard University Press. ISBN 978-0-674-04891-1.
- Steinberg, Jonathan (1990). All Or Nothing: The Axis and the Holocaust, 1941–1943. Psychology Press. ISBN 978-0-4150-4757-9.
- Tomasevich, Jozo (1975). War and Revolution in Yugoslavia, 1941–1945: The Chetniks. Stanford University Press. ISBN 978-0-8047-0857-9.
- Tomasevich, Jozo (2001). War and Revolution in Yugoslavia, 1941–1945: Occupation and Collaboration. Stanford University Press. ISBN 978-0-8047-3615-2. Archived from the original on 14 January 2026.
- Yeomans, Rory (2011). ""For Us, Beloved Commander, You Will Never Die!", Morning Jure Francetic, Ustasha Death Squad Leader". In the Shadow of Hitler: Personalities of the Right in Central and Eastern Europe. I.B Tauris.
- Yeomans, Rory (2014). Visions of Annihilation: The Ustasha Regime and the Cultural Politics of Fascism, 1941–1945. University of Pittsburgh Press. ISBN 978-0-82297-793-3.
- Yeomans, Rory (2015). The Utopia of Terror: Life and Death in Wartime Croatia. Boydell & Brewer. ISBN 978-1-58046-545-8.
- Korb, Alexander (2010). "A Multipronged Attack: Ustaša Persecution of Serbs, Jews, and Roma in Wartime Croatia". Eradicating Differences: The Treatment of Minorities in Nazi-Dominated Europe. Cambridge Scholars Publishing. pp. 145–163. ISBN 9781443824491.
- Novak, Viktor (2011). Magnum Crimen: Half a Century of Clericalism in Croatia. Vol. 1. Gambit. ISBN 9788676240494.
- Novak, Viktor (2011). Magnum Crimen: Half a Century of Clericalism in Croatia. Vol. 2. Gambit. ISBN 9788676240494.
- Stojanović, Dubravka (2011). "Value changes in the interpretations of history in Serbia". In Listhaug, Ola (ed.). Civic and uncivic values: Serbia in the post-Milošević era. Central European University Press. ISBN 978-963-9776-98-2.
- Kallis, Aristotle (2008). Genocide and Fascism: The Eliminationist Drive in Fascist Europe. Routledge. ISBN 9781134300341.
- Suppan, Arnold (2014). Hitler – Beneš – Tito: Konflikt, Krieg und Völkermord in Ostmittel- und Südosteuropa. Austrian Academy of Sciences.
- Thomas, Nigel; Mikulan, Krunoslav (1995). Axis Forces in Yugoslavia 1941–45. Bloomsbury Publishing. ISBN 9781855324732.
- Newman, John Paul (2017). "War Veterans, Fascism, and Para-Fascist Departures in the Kingdom of Yugoslavia, 1918–1941". Fascism. 6: 42–74. doi:10.1163/22116257-00601003.
- Newman, John Paul (2014). "Serbian and Habsburg Military institutional legacies in Yugoslavia after 1918" (PDF). First World War Studies. 5 (3): 319–335. doi:10.1080/19475020.2014.1001519. S2CID 73611212. Archived (PDF) from the original on 19 July 2018.
- McCormick, Rob (2008). "The United States' Response to Genocide in the Independent State of Croatia, 1941–1945". Genocide Studies and Prevention. 3 (1): 75–98. doi:10.1353/gsp.2011.0060. S2CID 145309437. Archived from the original on 15 April 2021.
- Hamerli, Petra (2015). "The Hungarian-Italian Support of the Croatian Separatism between 1928 and 1934". West Bohemian Historical Review (1). ISSN 1804-5480.
- Zuckerman, Boško (2010). "Prilog proučavanju antisemitizma i protužidovske propagande u vodećem zagrebačkom ustaškom tisku (1941-1943)". Journal of the Institute of Croatian History (in Croatian). 42 (1): 355–385. ISSN 0353-295X. Archived from the original on 20 November 2021.
- Gumz, Jonathan E. (2001). "Wehrmacht Perceptions of Mass Violence in Croatia, 1941–1942". The Historical Journal. 44 (4): 1015–1038. doi:10.1017/S0018246X01001996. ISSN 0018-246X. JSTOR 3133549. S2CID 159947669.
- Trifković, Gaj (2020). Parleying with the Devil: Prisoner Exchange in Yugoslavia, 1941‒1945. University Press of Kentucky. ISBN 978-1-94966-811-7.
- Alonso, Miguel; Kramer, Alan; Rodrigo, Javier (2019). Fascist Warfare, 1922–1945: Aggression, Occupation, Annihilation. Springer Nature. pp. 243–261. ISBN 978-3-03027-648-5.
- Adriano, Pino; Cingolani, Giorgio (2018). Nationalism and Terror: Ante Pavelić and Ustasha Terrorism from Fascism to the Cold War. Central European University Press. ISBN 978-9-63386-206-3.
- Gilbert, Martin (2010). The Righteous: The Unsung Heroes of the Holocaust. Henry Holt and Company. ISBN 978-1-4299-0036-2.
- Popović, Jovo; Lolić, Marko; Latas, Branko (1988). Pop izdaje (in Croatian). Stvarnost. ISBN 9788670750395. at Google Books at znaci.net Archived 30 October 2020 at the Wayback Machine
- Goldstein, Ivo (2018). Jasenovac. Fraktura. p. 731. ISBN 978-953-266-987-9.
- Littlejohn, David (1994). Foreign Legions of the Third Reich. Vol. 3. R. James Bender Publishing. ISBN 978-0-912138-29-9.
- Ragazzi, Francesco (2017). Governing Diasporas in International Relations: The Transnational Politics of Croatia and Former Yugoslavia. Taylor & Francis Group. ISBN 978-1-138-73963-5.
- Velikonja, Mitja (2003). Religious Separation and Political Intolerance in Bosnia-Herzegovina. Texas A&M University Press. ISBN 978-1-58544-226-3.
- Fischer, Bernd J., ed. (2007). Balkan Strongmen: Dictators and Authoritarian Rulers of South-Eastern Europe. Purdue University Press. ISBN 978-1-55753-455-2.
