= Pius XII, The Holocaust, and the Cold War =

2008 book by Michael Phayer

- Author: Michael Phayer
- Language: English
- Genre: Non-fiction
- Publication date: 2008
- Publication place: United States

Pius XII, The Holocaust, and the Cold War is a 2008 book by historian Michael Phayer which makes use of documents that had been released under US President Bill Clinton's 1997 executive order declassifying wartime and postwar documents.

Phayer's thesis is that Pius XII refused to resist and at times even enabled the Nazi regime because he considered Communism the greater threat, one that he believed only Nazism could effectively counter. The charge is not a new one: Robert Katz, in his 1969 book, "Black Sabbath," first posited the theory: "To protest Hitler's Germany would weaken what the Church often referred to as 'the only possible bulwark against Bolshevism.'" (Katz himself, however, adds another reason for Pius's alleged "silence" in regards to the Nazi depredations: "Moreover, to denounce Stalin's Russia would be a blow to the Western Powers with whom the Communists were allied.")

== The book ==
In its introduction, the books says that new documents had been stored at the US National Archives and Holocaust Memorial Museum, including both diplomatic correspondence, American espionage, and even decryptions of German communications, new documents released by the Argentine government and the British Foreign Office, and the diary of Bishop Joseph Patrick Hurley, and that these documents reveal new information about Pius XII's actions regarding the Ustaše regime, the genocides in Poland, the finances of the wartime church, the deportation of the Roman Jews, and the postwar "ratlines" for Nazis and fascists fleeing Europe. In the book, Phayer writes, "the face of Pope Pius that we see in these documents is not the same face we see in the eleven volumes the Vatican published of World War II documents, a collection which, though valuable, is nonetheless critically flawed because of its many omissions".

== Critical reception ==
=== Positive reviews ===
Charles Gallagher in his article for peer reviewed The Heythrop Journal described the work as "perhaps the single most comprehensively important book to appear on the topic of Pius XII's and church-state relations in recent years". He notes that Phayer takes up the question "of the Vatican attitude of anti-Judaism as distinct from racial anti-Semitism, but he calls the distinction 'paper thin.' And that Phayer's assertion that Catholic anti- Judaism 'led to the physical elimination of Jews,' rather than assisted in creating a climate for such activity is still open to question." He describes Phayer's treatment of the Cold War pope as "critical and discerning. The thrust here is to show the pope as the 'First Cold Warrior.'" Gallagher regards Phayer's treatment of Ratline activity as "impressive and enlightening". He further notes the book's "exceptional primary resourcing" and that Phayer is "one of the first historians of the Cold War papacy to use Record Group 84, the diplomatic post files of the President's Personal Envoy to the pope. These files, rather than the so-called 'country file' of the Vatican, contain choice memoranda, telegraphic traffic, and intelligence insights previously undiscovered. In the larger trajectory of Phayer's book, the ratline investigations show a pope struck to the core by the insidious nature of worldwide communism. For Phayer, Pacelli's fear of communism allowed him look askance at the funnelling of atrocity perpetrators to South America where they would be expected to fight the spread of communism.

Gallagher groups Phayers book amongst "three excellent treatments" he reviewed in 2009, the other two being "The Papacy, The Jews, and the Holocaust" Frank J. Coppa and "The Holy See and Hitler's Germany" by Gerhard Besier. He further notes that "Phayer makes the apt distinction between professional 'historians [and] writers whose sole objective is to defend Pius XII' and that so often in recent years, camps of defenders and critics have dredged-up one or two documents at a time and blasted their contents, usually out of full context, across media screens. A real strength of Phayer's book is that he is able to briefly assess each of the most prominent one-off assertions and contextualize it within the historiography and in light of the copious new information he has found in the archives."

David Kertzer wrote in The American Historical Review "The new material that Phayer has brought to light from the National Archives offers a useful contribution to our understanding of the controversial relationship between the Vatican and the perpetrators of the Holocaust, especially in the postwar period."

=== Negative reviews ===
Writing for the Catholic journal New Oxford Review, Vincent A. Lapomarda criticised the book, saying that it was "more the product of one man's subjective views than of objective evidence. Using documents released during the Clinton Administration, the author stresses how much the decision-making of Pope Pius XII was devoid of moral considerations because he was preoccupied with saving Western civilization from communism. While Phayer frequently points to omissions in the eleven volumes of World War II documents released by the Holy See, he fills these alleged gaps with documents that have been discredited by such historians as Robert A. Graham and Matteo Sanfilippo. In fact, Phayer himself casts doubt on one of his crucial sources, Unholy Trinity (1991) by Mark Aarons and John Loftus, declaring that it was "not a reliable account in many instances," while later asserting that "Loftus and Aaron told a tale that was mostly accurate."

== See also ==
- The Catholic Church and the Holocaust
