= Public statements of Pope Pius XII on the Holocaust =

Controversial statements made by Pope Pius XII

The public statements of Pope Pius XII on the Holocaust, or lack thereof, are one of the most controversial elements of the historical debate about Pope Pius XII and the Holocaust. Pius XII's statements have been scrutinized as much, if not more, than his actions during the same period. Pius XII's statements, both public and private, are quite well documented in the Vatican Secret Archives; eleven volumes of documents from his papacy were published between 1965 and 1981 in Actes et documents du Saint Siège relatifs à la Seconde Guerre Mondiale.

Many of Pope Pius XII's critics have alleged "silence" by the pontiff during The Holocaust. Some of Pius XII's defenders have contested whether he was silent, while others have instead argued that to speak out would have been useless or counterproductive. According to Prof. Michael Phayer, "the question of the pope's silence has become the focus of intense historical debate and analysis".

== Background ==
=== Terminology ===
The term "Holocaust" had been used since the Middle Ages, and was used by contemporaries during World War II, although it did not come to refer exclusively to the genocide of the Jews in scholarly writing until the 1960s. Pius XII used the term "holocaust" twice in his encyclicals, but used it in its religious meaning, not referring to the historical event. The term "genocide" was not coined until 1944 by Raphael Lemkin, a Polish-Jewish legal scholar.

Much scrutiny has focused on whether Pius XII specifically identified the perpetrators or victims; many of his more ambiguous statements, which make no reference to Nazi Germany or the Jews, have been argued to apply to the Holocaust by some of his supporters.

Many of Pius XII's more important writings and speeches were not given in English, and some of his words have roughly been translated as "race", "creed", and "blood". A far wider range of his speeches referred generally to "violence", "suffering" or the victims of war.

=== Appeals for a statement ===
Appeals for the pope to speak out against the Holocaust, along with information on its extent and nature, came from members of his own diplomatic corps, Catholic bishops and priests throughout Europe, ordinary lay Catholics, foreign governments and governments-in-exile, and various prominent Jews and Jewish organizations. By 1942, appeals had turned to open criticism, and messages to the effect that the pope was losing his "moral authority" due to his failure to condemn Nazi atrocities from reports which were coming in from diplomats accredited to the Vatican from the United States, the United Kingdom, Switzerland, Brazil, Uruguay, Peru, Cuba, Belgium, and Poland.

Moreover, the Allied governments condemned the genocide of the Jews on December 17, 1942. However, Pius XII refused requests to endorse the United Nations's (not yet an officially chartered body) declaration; one such request came from Harold Tittmann, his US ambassador.

== Types of statements ==
=== Encyclicals ===
==== Mit brennender Sorge ====
Mit brennender Sorge, a 1937 encyclical by Pope Pius XI, written mostly by German Cardinal Michael von Faulhaber, is sometimes included in debates about Pius XII. As Cardinal Secretary of State, Pacelli doubtlessly contributed in some way to the drafting of the document, mostly its introduction dealing with the history of the Reichskonkordat. The Reichskonkordat was a treaty negotiated and signed by Pacelli as Secretary (and, in a general sense, as nuncio to Germany), and Mit brennender Sorge was primarily focused on the specific violations of that treaty.

The encyclical was issued along with its sister document, Divini Redemptoris (also 1937), which levied similar criticisms against communism. Pius XI also commissioned a successor encyclical to Mit brennender Sorge in 1938, Humani generis unitas, which Pius XII controversially did not promulgate upon his election as pope in 1939.

The most relevant passage of Mit brennender Sorge is as follows:

Whoever exalts race, or the people, or the state, or a particular form of state, or the depositories of power, or any other fundamental value of the human community—however necessary and honorable be their function in worldly things—whoever raises these notions above their standard value and divinizes them to an idolatrous level, distorts and perverts an order of the world planned and created by God.

==== Summi pontificatus ====
Summi pontificatus was the first encyclical of Pius XII, promulgated in 1939. The bulk of the document deals with general and abstracted themes, but the situation in Poland (which had been invaded shortly before the encyclical's promulgation) is referred to with specificity once:

The blood of countless human beings, even noncombatants, raises a piteous dirge over a nation such as Our dear Poland, which, for its fidelity to the Church, for its services in the defense of Christian civilization, written in indelible characters in the annals of history, has a right to the generous and brotherly sympathy of the whole world, while it awaits, relying on the powerful intercession of Mary, Help of Christians, the hour of a resurrection in harmony with the principles of justice and true peace.

==== Mystici corporis Christi ====
In 1943, Pius issued the Mystici corporis Christi encyclical, in which he condemned the practice of killing the disabled and reiterated Catholic teaching on the unity of the human race. He stated his "profound grief" at the murder of the deformed, the insane, and those suffering from hereditary disease... as though they were a useless burden to Society", in condemnation of the ongoing Nazi euthanasia program. The program was prelude to the Holocaust, and involved the killing of the senile, the mentally handicapped and mentally ill, epileptics, cripples, children with Down's Syndrome and people with similar afflictions. The program involved the systematic murder of more than 70,000 people. The encyclical also reiterated Catholic teaching on the equality of races - speaking of "divinely-given unity - by which all men of every race are united to Christ in the bond of brotherhood".

The Encyclical was followed, on 26 September 1943, by an open condemnation by the German Bishops which, from every German pulpit, denounced the killing of "innocent and defenceless mentally handicapped, incurably infirm and fatally wounded, innocent hostages, and disarmed prisoners of war and criminal offenders, people of a foreign race or descent".

==== Communium Interpretes ====
The remainder of Pius XII's wartime encyclicals addressed theological issues or the anniversary of historical events within the church. Pius XII next addressed the situation in Europe in April 1945 with Communium Interpretes. The short document, written when the war was near conclusion, turned to the themes of peace and reconciliation, emphasizing the need for charity on the part of the victors.

=== Radio addresses ===
Pius XII's 1942 Christmas address measured 26 pages and over 45 minutes. The majority of the speech spoke generally about human rights and civil society, focusing on principles rather than particular facts. Pius XII, however, did not address the perpetrators or victims by name, nor did he mention Jews or antisemitism.

The "pivotal words that remain one of the key flashpoints in the Holocaust-related controversy that continues to swirl around him" came near the end of the speech. Pius XII stated:

Humanity owes this vow to those hundreds of thousands who, without any fault on their part, sometimes only because of their nationality or race, have been consigned to death or to a slow decline [also translated: "marked down for death or gradual extinction"]

Some contemporaries, particularly the hierarchy of the Dutch Catholic Church, did interpret the speech to refer to the Holocaust. However, Catholic Poles believed that the address referred to them alone and wished that the pope had identified the Germans as the perpetrators. After the speech, Pius XII also assured his German ambassador, Diego von Bergen, by pulling him aside and reassuring him that his remarks were intended for the Soviets and Stalin rather than the Germans.

Historians are divided on the speech, which remains a "lightning rod in debates" with its interpretation "unsettled and unsettling". One of Pius XII's main critics, Michael Phayer, did change his interpretation of the speech between his 2000 and 2008 books, acknowledging in his later work that historians (himself included) have been "too dismissive of the 1942 address" although he agrees that "Pius never spoke out again".

=== Speeches ===
Pius XII gave many speeches on the subject of the war in Europe, generally urging peace; according to Sánchez, "he was most circumspect, not naming names and avoiding any hint that one power was worse than another or that the Germans were bent on unjustified aggression". Additionally, "most of Pius' words are bound up in papal rhetoric and scriptural allusions rather than formulated as direct statements".

Sánchez identifies the few public speeches of Pius XII which he believes constitute "his few direct statements". However, Sánchez's list pertains to the war, not the Holocaust; in Sánchez's view, Pius XII was indeed silent on the Holocaust, but justifiably so (see below). Sánchez summarizes his view as follows:

Popes have seldom spoken in direct simple sentences. Pius, a trained diplomat, was even less direct than most. Reading encyclicals and other papal statements often requires interpretive skills to determine just exactly what is said. As a result, people can read into some papal words what they want to hear. And looked at in hindsight, Pius' words of protest fall short when measured against the horror of Nazi machinery of destruction.

=== Private correspondence ===
Sánchez also analyzes Pius XII's private correspondence, most of which is to various diplomats either accredited to or from the pope. He mentions none that pertain to the Holocaust directly, although he does produce examples of concern for non-combatant victims.

== Statements of his diplomats ==
Much has been said about the statements and correspondents of Pius XII's nuncios, placed throughout Europe, in no small part because these statements comprise the bulk of the Actes et documents du Saint Siège relatifs à la Seconde Guerre Mondiale (ADSS), the only documents from Pius XII's papacy which have been made available for researchers from the Vatican Secret Archives. Perhaps the most comprehensive study is that of Morley, Vatican Diplomacy and the Jews During the Holocaust, 1939-1943 (1980), . Morley's central conclusion is:

This study of the Vatican and Jewish sources has revealed little evidence that the nuncios manifested any consistent humanitarian concern about the sufferings of the Jews during the years 1939 to 1943. This research has indicated that the Vatican diplomats only rarely acted on behalf of the Jews as Jews, and this usually only for specific individuals. They sometimes had words of sympathy for the Jews, but little action followed from these words.

By the count of Australian historian Paul O'Shea, volume eight of the ADSS contains 107 references to Jews in the period prior to December 1942; various other historians have analyzed these, statement by statement.

== Post-war statements ==
Pius XII lived and reigned as pope until his death in October 1958.

== Evaluations by scholarly sources ==
=== Sources criticizing silence ===
Carlo Falconi's The Silence of Pius XII (first published in 1965, in Italian) is devoted almost entirely to the analysis of the public statements, and lack thereof, of the pope. Falconi argues: that the pope was silent, that the pope had specific and extensive knowledge of the Holocaust, and that the pope was frequently implored to speak out. Falconi advances this argument generally, and then specifically in the cases of Poland and Croatia. Falconi examines the various justifications and explanations for Pius XII's silence, offering his opinion on their plausibility; he himself settles on a combination of pessimism, fear of Communism, and securing the future survival and influence of the church.

Falconi summarizes Pius XII's public statements as follows:

Pius XII never promulgated an explicit and direct condemnation of the war and aggression, and still less of the unspeakable acts of violence carried out by the Germans and their accomplices under cover of war.

Falconi's work examines not only the Holocaust, but also the war as a whole; specifically with respect to genocide, Falconi concludes:

Not a single document dealt with it explicitly or exclusively, and the rare and limited hints were made in summary allusions. Moreover these were drafted not in a language of outrage but consistently in a cold and juridical style. We look in vain among the hundreds of pages of Pius XII's allocutions, messages, and writings for the angry, fiery words that would brand such horrible acts for ever.

Yad Vashem's caption affixed to two photos of Pius XII in its Jerusalem Holocaust memorial focuses in large part on Pius XII's lack of public protest:

In 1933, when he was Secretary of the Vatican State, he was active in obtaining a Concordat with the German regime to preserve the Church's rights in Germany, even if this meant recognizing the Nazi racist regime. When he was elected Pope in 1939, he shelved a letter against racism and anti-Semitism that his predecessor had prepared. Even when reports about the murder of Jews reached the Vatican, the Pope did not protest either verbally or in writing. In December 1942, he abstained from signing the Allied declaration condemning the extermination of the Jews. When Jews were deported from Rome to Auschwitz, the Pope did not intervene. The Pope maintained his neutral position throughout the war, with the exception of appeals to the rulers of Hungary and Slovakia towards its end. His silence and the absence of guidelines obliged Churchmen throughout Europe to decide on their own how to react.

In a review of Michael Phayer's book "Pius XII, The Holocaust, and the Cold War for the Catholic journal Commonweal John Connelly wrote

We know that Pius never openly condemned Nazi genocide of the Jews. But what did he say when fellow Catholics became victims of mass murder? The answer is: not much. From the fall of 1939 the Nazi regime began a slaughter of Polish Catholics without precedent. Priests were arrested and incarcerated by the thousands. Men, women, and children died by the hundreds of thousands, victims of calculated policies of extermination that can be called genocidal. Pius was supplied with reports of Nazi crimes in Poland, but to the chagrin of Polish church officials he issued no public protest. During 1942 reports poured into the Vatican detailing Nazi mass murder, not only of Poles but of Jews. Poles and non-Poles wondered in disbelief at the Vatican's silence. In September 1942 the governments of Brazil, Uruguay, Peru, Cuba, and Belgium sent demarches to the Holy See asking for the pope to speak out against the atrocities. American and British representatives to the Vatican also urged the pope to protest. Phayer surmises that Pius must have felt upstaged by virtually every non-Nazi voice of opinion on earth, and therefore released his Christmas message in 1942, which mentioned the "hundreds of thousands of persons who, without any fault on their part, sometimes only because of their nationality or race, have been consigned to death or to a slow decline.

=== Sources defending silence ===
The bulk of Sánchez's work is dedicated to examining the motives of Pius XII for (what Sánchez deems to be) his silence. Sánchez proceeds to argue at length that a papal protest would have made matters worse. He argues that the pope himself held this view; according to Sánchez, Pius XII only expressed this view once publicly, but repeated it more often privately; in a June 2, 1943 address to the College of Cardinals the pope said:

Every single word in Our statements addressed to the competent authorities, and every one of Our public utterances, has had to be weighed and pondered by Us with deep gravity, in the very interest of those who are suffering, so as not to render their position even more difficult and unbearable than before, be it unwittingly and unintentionally.

Albrecht von Kessel, who during the war was an official at the German Embassy to the Holy See, wrote in 1963:

We were convinced that a fiery protest by Pius XII against the persecution of the Jews ... would certainly not have saved the life of a single Jew. Hitler, like a trapped beast, would react to any menace that he felt directed at him, with cruel violence.

Commenting on the counter productiveness of religious condemnation of Nazism, Mgr Jean Bernard, who was interned at Dachau, recounted that:

The detained priests trembled every time news reached us of some protest by a religious authority, but particularly by the Vatican. We all had the impression that our warders made us atone heavily for the fury these protests evoked ... whenever the way we were treated became more brutal, the Protestant pastors among the prisoners used to vent their indignation on the Catholic priests: 'Again your big naive Pope and those simpletons, your bishops, are shooting their mouths off .. why don't they get the idea once and for all, and shut up. They play the heroes and we have to pay the bill.

A similar sentiment was echoed by Jewish historian Pinchas Lapide who noted that:

The saddest and most thought provoking conclusion is that whilst the Catholic clergy of Holland protested more loudly, expressly and frequently against Jewish persecutions than the religious hierarchy of any other Nazi-occupied country, more Jews - some 107,000 or 79% of the total - were deported from Holland; more than anywhere else in the West.

Lapide concludes that:

When armed force ruled well-nigh omnipotent, and morality was at its lowest ebb, Pius XII commanded none of the former and could only appeal to the latter, in confronting, with bare hands, the full might of evil. A sounding protest, which might turn out to be self-thwarting - or quiet, piecemeal rescue? Loud words - or prudent deeds? The dilemma must have been sheer agony, for which ever course he chose, horrible consequences were inevitable. Unable to cure the sickness of an entire civilization, and unwilling to bear the brunt of Hitler's fury, the Pope, unlike many far mightier than he, alleviated, relieved, retrieved, appealed, petitioned - and saved as best he could by his own lights. Who, but a prophet or a martyr could have done much more?.

=== Sources claiming non-silence ===
Margherita Marchione, a Catholic nun who has written several books responding the critics of Pius XII, disputes whether Pius XII was silent. She states:

In view of the evidence, now apparent and accessible, the charge of modern critics that Pius XII was "silent" is unfair. His secret diplomatic initiatives, solemn warnings, and appeals to peoples and governments were not heeded. Apparently critics have failed to do their research or have refused to acknowledge the evidence regarding the alleged "silence" of Pius XII.

Marchione seemingly argues both that Pius XII spoke out and that speaking out would have been counterproductive, proceeding to argue:

Voices in hindsight are judging the "Popes" silence without considering the consequences of "speaking out." Those critics do not recall that the Pope had been advised by Jewish leaders and by the bishops in occupied countries not to protest publicly against Nazi atrocities. However, Pius XII frequently invoked "God's vengeance" on the persecutors. His words were the brave words of a diplomat who put focus on "those who are responsible."

Marchione's book reproduces an article originally published by Pierre Blet, a Jesuit priest who served as one of the editors of the ADSS, in La Civiltà Cattolica on the topic; Blet's article does not quote any particular statements of Pius XII, although it does include numerous quotes of praise of Pius XII by contemporaries and a lengthy explanation of the contents of the ADSS, criticizing historians who requested that the full archives be opened. Marchione prefaces Blet's article with an exchange where a reporter asks Pope John Paul II about Pius XII's "silence" and the pope replies: "Read Father Blet's article". In a later book, Marchione states:

Whenever Pius XII spoke out, there was immediate retaliation by the Nazis. There were more than sixty protests! The so-called "silence" of Pope Pius XII is a myth.

== In popular culture ==
The "silence" of Pius XII is the primary subject matter of Rolf Hochhuth's 1963 play The Deputy, which was adapted into the 2002 film Amen. by Costa Gavras.
