= Zvonimir Pospišil =

Yugoslav revolutionary (1904–1941)

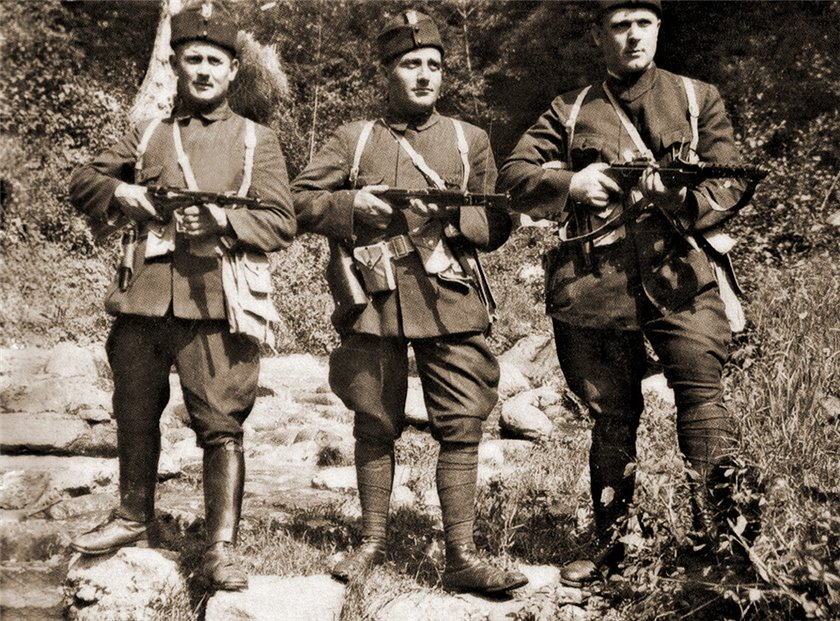
- Mijo Babić, Vlado Chernozemski and Zvonimir Pospišil (from left to right)
- Born: 9 June 1904; Vukovina, Croatia-Slavonia, Austria-Hungary (modern-day Croatia)
- Died: 17 June 1941 (aged 37); Pržine, Eastern Herzegovina, Independent State of Croatia (modern-day Bosnia and Herzegovina)
- Military career
- Allegiance: Independent State of Croatia
- Branch: Ustaše militia
- Conflicts: Eastern Herzegovina Uprising

Zvonimir Pospišil (9 June 1904 – 17 June 1941) was a Croatian revolutionary who was one of the main Ustaše terrorists that organised the assassination of Alexander I of Yugoslavia in Marseille in October 1934.

== Early life ==
Pospišil was born on 9 June 1904 in Vukovina, Austria-Hungary (modern-day Croatia) to Ladislav and Marija Kralj and was educated as a mechanic.

== Before World War II ==
On 22 March 1929, Pospišil, Mijo Babić, Marko Hranilović, and Matija Soldin murdered Toni Šlegel, the chief editor of newspaper Novosti from Zagreb and president of Jugoštampa, which was the beginning of the terrorist actions of Ustaše. Hranilović and Soldin were both arrested, convicted of murder, and executed by hanging. Stjepan Javor, the leader of the Croatian Rights Youth, the nationalist organization in which the assassins were members was sentenced to 20 years in prison. He died in prison in 1936.

On 9 October 1934, Pospišil was involved in the assassination of King Alexander I of Yugoslavia in France. The assassin Chernozemski was killed, while Pospišil was arrested, along with Ivan Rajić and Milan Babić. All three men were found guilty of murder and sentenced to life in prison, albeit Yugoslav authorities had hoped they would be executed. Following the German invasion of France in 1940, the men were released from prison.

== Death ==
On 17 June 1941, during the battle in Pržine in the June 1941 uprising in eastern Herzegovina, Pospišil was killed in a battle between 600 Ustaše and rebels which lasted for two hours. Ustaše retreated toward Gacko and Avtovac and burned the village of Zborna Gomila, after four died on the battlefield including Zvonimir Pospišil.

During the uprising in eastern Herzegovina the other two conspirators of the assassination of King Alexander, Mijo Babić and Antun Pogorelac, were also killed during their attacks on rebels.

== Sources ==
- Colić, Mladen (1973). Takozvana Nezavisna Država Hrvatska 1941. Delta-pres.
- Donat, Branimir (1 January 1998). Politika hrvatske književnosti i književnost hrvatske politike. Matica hrvatska. ISBN 978-953-150-157-6.
- Knežević, Danilo (1961). Četrdeset godina: zbornik sećanja aktivista jugoslovenskog revolucionarnog radničkog pokreta. Kultura.
- Tomasevich, Jozo (2001). War and Revolution in Yugoslavia, 1941–1945: Occupation and Collaboration. Vol. 2. San Francisco: Stanford University Press. ISBN 0-8047-3615-4.
- Volkov, Vladimir Konstantinovich (1983). Ubistvo kralja Aleksandra--Hitlerova zavera. Nova knjiga.
