= Mijo Babić =

Croatian fascist commander

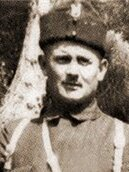
- Babić c. 1934
- Born: 1 September 1903; Nova Bukovica, Croatia-Slavonia, Austria-Hungary (modern-day Croatia)
- Died: 3 July 1941 (aged 37); Trusina, Berkovići, Independent State of Croatia (modern-day Bosnia and Herzegovina)
- Other name: Marjan
- Military career
- Allegiance: Independent State of Croatia
- Branch: Ustaše militia
- Service years: 1929–1941
- Rank: Major
- Nicknames: Mijo and Giovanni
- Commands: The Third Bureau of the Ustasha Surveillance Service
- Conflicts: Eastern Herzegovina Uprising

Mijo Babić (1 September 1903 – 3 July 1941), also known as Mijo Kralj, nicknamed Giovanni, was a deputy of the Croatian fascist dictator Ante Pavelić, and the first commander of all concentration camps in the Independent State of Croatia. He was head of the Third Bureau of the Ustasha Surveillance Service (Croatian: Ustaška nadzorna služba—UNS), and was also a member of the main Ustaše headquarters, one of the two main deputies of Pavelić.

== Murder of Toni Šlegel ==
On 22 March 1929, Babić, Zvonimir Pospišil, Marko Hranilović, Matija Soldin murdered Toni Šlegel, the chief editor of Novosti and president of Jugoslovenska štampa, in Zagreb. At that time, Babić was a chauffeur for the Siemens plant in Zagreb and, according to official reports, he murdered one and wounded another of the policemen who came to arrest him, and managed to escape. The order to kill Šlegel came from Pavelić, who suspected that he was an informant. Publicly, he maintained that the murder had been committed by assassins from Belgrade. Hranilović and Soldin were both arrested, convicted of murder, and executed by hanging. Stjepan Javor, the leader of the Croatian Rights Youth, the nationalist organization in which the assassins were members was sentenced to 20 years in prison; he died in prison in 1936. Following their arrests, a number of terrorist attacks took place in Zagreb, including an incident in which a police station was bombed.

Babić fled to Italy where he stayed until Yugoslavia's entry into World War II. Italian police considered Babić a very dangerous man who was capable of the worst crimes.

== Planning ==
While he was in Italy, the Ustaše spent years planning for a genocidal campaign in their native country and trained a small band of followers for a takeover. As early as 1932, Babić, as one of the propagandists of Pavelić, had written:

When blood starts to spill it will gush in streams ... the blood of the enemy will turn into gushes and rivers, and bombs will scatter their bones like the wind ... every Ustasha is poised ... to ... cleanse and cut whatever is rotten from the healthy body of the Croatian people.

Babić became one of Pavelić's most trusted confidantes. During their exile in Lipari, he killed twenty men suspected of being disloyal to the Ustaše leader. In January 1938, the Italian authorities intercepted a letter addressed to Pavelić from Babić and Ljubomir Kremzir outlining a plan to secretly return to Yugoslavia and carry out various terrorist attacks—including the assassinations of prime minister Milan Stojadinović and prince regent Paul—with the aim to "trigger the revolution in Croatia".

== Concentration camps ==
Babić participated in preparations for the establishment of Danica concentration camp. At the end of May or beginning of June 1941, he went to Pag island, based on the order of Andrija Artuković, where he established Slana concentration camp. Babić also organized the Kruščica concentration camp near Travnik.

== Blagaj massacre ==
Babić had an important role in the Blagaj massacre on 9 May 1941. Against Pavelić's order, Babić brought several trucks of Ustaše from Zagreb to massacre 520 Serb peasants in the region of Kordun, where they had lived together with Croats for many centuries.

== Killing of Serbs in eastern Herzegovina ==
Organized by Babić, Ivo Herenčić, Jure Francetić and other Ustaše officers, killings of Serbs were extensive in eastern Herzegovina.

In June 1941, Babić and a group of Ustaše officers, on the orders of Andrija Artuković, went to Herzegovina to organize killings of its Serb population. On 16 or 17 June 1941, Babić came to Čapljina. He and other Ustaše commanders had been instructed to suppress rebellions and undertake the complete extermination of the Serb population of the region and settle people from other parts who would be loyal to the Ustaše movement.

== June 1941 uprising in eastern Herzegovina ==
Babić and a group of Ustaše officers were organizing a struggle against rebels during the June 1941 uprising in eastern Herzegovina.

According to Vladimir Dedijer, Babić was killed by a rebel unit commanded by Dukica Graovac. Babić's machine gun, a present from Ante Pavelić, was first taken by Vlado Šegrt and later by Spira Srzentić. Babić held the rank of Major at the time of his death. His body was transported through Sarajevo to Zagreb where Pavelić ordered eight days of mourning for members of his Bodyguard Battalion. Following his demise, a newspaper in Croatia dedicated a whole page to coverage of Babić's "heroic" death battling against "Serbian Chetniks".

== Sources ==
- Adriano, Pino; Cingolani, Giorgio (2018). Nationalism and Terror: Ante Pavelić and Ustasha Terrorism from Fascism to the Cold War. Budapest, Hungary: Central European University Press. ISBN 978-9-63386-206-3.
- Basta, Milan (1986). Rat je završen 7 dana kasnije. Privredni pregled.
- Bulajić, Milan (1994). The Role of the Vatican in the break-up of the Yugoslav State: The Mission of the Vatican in the Independent State of Croatia. Ustashi Crimes of Genocide. Belgrade: Stručna knjiga.
- Bulajić, Milan (1988). Ustaški zločini genocida i suđenje Andriji Artukoviću 1986. godine. Rad. ISBN 9788609001369.
- Bulajić, Milan (2002). Jasenovac: The Jewish-Serbian Holocaust (the role of the Vatican) in Nazi-Ustasha Croatia (1941-1945). Belgrade: Fund for Genocide Research, Stručna knjiga. ISBN 9788641902211.
- Cohen, Roger (1998). Hearts Grown Brutal: Sagas of Sarajevo. Random House. ISBN 978-0-679-45243-0.
- Dedijer, Vladimir (1987). Vatikan i Jasenovac: dokumenti. Rad. ISBN 9788609000751.
- Dedijer, Vladimir (1990). From November 28, 1942, to September 10, 1943. University of Michigan Press. ISBN 978-0-472-10109-2.
- Goldstein, Ivo; Goldstein, Slavko (2001). Holokaust u Zagrebu. Novi liber. ISBN 9789536045198.
- Jelić, Branimir (1982). Političke uspomene i rad Dra Branimira Jelića. Izdavač M. Šamija.
- Krizman, Bogdan (1983). Ante Pavelić i ustaše. Globus.
- Miletić, Antun (1986). Koncentracioni logor Jasenovac 1941–1945: dokumenta. Narodna knj. ISBN 9788676240340.
- Mojzes, Paul (16 October 2011). Balkan Genocides: Holocaust and Ethnic Cleansing in the Twentieth Century. Rowman & Littlefield Publishers. ISBN 978-1-4422-0665-6.
- Tomasevich, Jozo (2001). War and Revolution in Yugoslavia, 1941–1945: Occupation and Collaboration. Stanford Univ: Stanford University Press. ISBN 978-0-8047-3615-2.
- Tuđman, Franjo (1993). Hrvatska u monarhističkoj Jugoslaviji 1918–1941: 1929.-1941. Hrvatska sveučilišna naklada. ISBN 978-953-169-001-0.

Military offices
Preceded by Post created	head of the Third Bureau of the Ustasha Surveillance Service; April 1941 – 3 July 1941	Succeeded by Vjekoslav Luburić
