= Pope Pius XII and Yad Vashem =

Overview of the relationship between Pope Pius XII and the Yad Vashem monument

Yad Vashem, the state of Israel's official Holocaust memorial, has generally been critical of Pope Pius XII, the pope during The Holocaust. For decades, Pius XII has been nominated unsuccessfully for recognition as Righteous Among the Nations, an honor Yad Vashem confers on non-Jews who saved Jewish lives during the Holocaust altruistically and at risk to their own lives.

== Museum caption ==
Prior to July 2012, Yad Vashem affixed the following caption, in English and Hebrew, to two photographs of Pius XII in its Jerusalem memorial:

In 1933, when he was Secretary of the Vatican State, he was active in obtaining a Concordat with the German regime to preserve the Church's rights in Germany, even if this meant recognizing the Nazi racist regime. When he was elected Pope in 1939, he shelved a letter against racism and anti-Semitism that his predecessor had prepared. Even when reports about the murder of Jews reached the Vatican, the Pope did not protest either verbally or in writing. In December 1942, he abstained from signing the Allied declaration condemning the extermination of the Jews. When Jews were deported from Rome to Auschwitz, the Pope did not intervene. The Pope maintained his neutral position throughout the war, with the exception of appeals to the rulers of Hungary and Slovakia towards its end. His silence and the absence of guidelines obliged Churchmen throughout Europe to decide on their own how to react.

The caption made reference to the following controversies concerning Pope Pius XII and the Holocaust:

- His role in the drafting of the Reichskonkordat
- His failure to promulgate Humani generis unitas, "The Hidden Encyclical" of Pius XI
- His lack of public protest of the Holocaust
- His reaction to the Roman razzia
- The neutrality of Vatican City during World War II

In July 2012, the museum "slightly softened its rhetoric" and changed the wording in a way that "incorporates views of those who defend the Pope." An excerpt follows:

The Israeli newspaper Haaretz provided some excerpts from the revised language. The new text cites the pope's defenders, who maintain that his "neutrality prevented harsher measures against the Vatican and the Church's institutions throughout Europe, thus enabling a considerable number of secret rescue activities to take place at different levels of the Church." However, "until all relevant material is available to scholars, this topic will remain open to further inquiry," the new text reads.

== Nominations as Righteous among the Nations ==
Yad Vashem was created by the Knesset in 1953. The nominations process for designation as Righteous among the Nations has been administered by a committee chaired by a justice of the Supreme Court of Israel since 1963. Dr. Arieh Kubovy, an early chairman of the Yad Vashem Memorial authority, was somewhat at odds with Pius XII over his unsuccessful attempts to induce the pope to effect the return of Jewish children baptized during the Holocaust by Catholic institutions.

Nominations may only be made by Jews and may not concern the rescue of Jews converted to Catholicism during the Holocaust. The honor has been extended to two of Pius XII's nuncios: Angelo Rotta (in Hungary) and Andrea Cassulo (in Romania).

Rabbi David Dalin proposed such a nomination in his 2005 book The Myth of Hitler's Pope, but it is unclear if he himself made any formal nomination with Yad Vashem. Sister Margherita Marchione, a religious who has written many books defending Pius XII against his critics, stated around the same time: "I have asked Yad Vashem to posthumously recognize and honor him as 'Righteous among the nations'", although as a non-Jew she would be unable to make such a nomination.

Gary Krupp, the founder of the Pave the Way Foundation, announced in September 2009 that he was preparing documents for such a nomination. Krupp announced similar intentions for at least a year. According to Prof. John K. Roth, writing in the Journal of Church and State, "the chances that Yad Vashem will make Pius XII one of the 'Righteous Among the Nations' are slim."

== Vatican relations with Yad Vashem ==
Pope John Paul II spoke at Yad Vashem during his 2000 trip to the Middle East, but declined to directly comment on the conduct of his predecessor.

In 2007, the Vatican ambassador to Israel, Msgr. Antonio Franco, refused to attend an annual memorial service in Jerusalem in protest over the aforementioned caption. Yad Vashem responded that it was "shocked" by Franco's actions and called on the Vatican to open its wartime archives to researchers. Yad Vashem defended the caption but stated that it was "prepared to continue examining the issue". A spokesperson for the museum stated: "The Holocaust history museum presents the historical truth on Pope Pius XII as is known to scholars today. It is unacceptable to use diplomatic pressure when dealing with historical research."

== See also ==
- Catholic Church and Nazi Germany
- Pius XII and the German Resistance
- Pope Pius XII and Judaism
- Pope Pius XII and the Holocaust
- Pope Pius XII and the Roman razzia
