= Marko Hranilović =

Croatian nationalist

- Born: 11 December 1908; Zagreb, Kingdom of Croatia-Slavonia
- Died: 25 September 1931 (aged 22); Zagreb, Kingdom of Yugoslavia
- Status: Executed by hanging
- Conviction: Murder
- Penalty: Death

Marko Hranilović (11 December 1908 – 25 September 1931) was a Croatian nationalist and Secretary of the right-wing separatist Croatian Rights Youth (Croatian: Hrvatska pravaška omladina, HPO) in the Kingdom of Yugoslavia, which had been banned in 1929. He was executed in 1931 after being convicted of the murder of Toni Šlegel, a journalist. Also involved in the murder were Stjepan Javor, Matija Soldin, Zvonimir Pospišil, and Mijo Babić.

Hranilović was implicated in the murder after the arrest of Stjepan Javor, head of the HPO, on 31 October 1929. The HPO was accused of being a terrorist organization and Hranilović was charged with the murder of journalist Šlegel, along with Javor and Soldin. During the trial, the HPO was accused of associating with the nationalist exiles Ante Pavelić and Gustav Perčec. Hranilović vehemently denied any contact with these figures, and proved to be one of the most combative in court. He pleaded not guilty to all charges. He sparred with the court several times, including one instance where he called himself a "citizen of imprisoned Croatia".

Vladko Maček and Mile Budak served as attorneys for the defence. Maček, as leader of the Croatian Peasant Party, was essentially the leader of the Croats within the kingdom at this time. Despite the defence's best efforts, Hranilović and Soldin were both sentenced to death by hanging. They were executed on 25 September 1931 on Petrinja Street, Zagreb. Javor was sentenced to 20 years in prison. He died in prison in 1936.

== Links ==
- Mario Jareb, Ustaško-domobranski pokret. Školska knjiga, d.d., Zagreb, 2006.
