= The Catholic Church and the Holocaust, 1930–1965 =

Book by Michael Phayer

- Author: Michael Phayer
- Language: English
- Genre: History
- Publisher: Indiana University Press
- Publication date: 2000
- Publication place: United States
- ISBN: 978-0-253-21471-3

The Catholic Church and the Holocaust, 1930–1965 is a book written by American historian Michael Phayer on the topic of Pope Pius XII and the Holocaust. It was published in 2000.

== Preference for quiet diplomacy ==
Harvard professor Stanley Hoffmann considered it "a comprehensive and deeply disturbing volume" which "describes in detail Pope Pius XII's preference for quiet diplomacy with Hitler and his regime, his anxiety about the Catholic Church's fate, his solicitude for Germany's Catholics, and his conviction that communism posed a greater threat than did Nazism".

== Helping Jews privately but not publicly ==
According to Robert A. Krieg, from the University of Notre Dame, this book is "an invaluable contribution to understanding the Catholic Church and the Holocaust." Phayer's main thesis, says Krieg, is that Pius XII privately helped Jews only to the extent that his efforts did not jeopardize two priorities in his foreign policy:

First, judging that the Church's primary enemy was not Nazism but Communism, the Pope wanted to maintain good ties with Germans and their government so that he could work with them to resist the spread of Communism into Europe. Second, concerned to protect Rome from destruction during the war, he did not want to say anything that might bring down the Luftwaffe's bombs upon Vatican City.
