= Pržine, Gacko =

Pržine Пржине
- Village
- Location within Bosnia and Herzegovina
- Coordinates: 43°04′29″N 18°33′25″E
- Country: Bosnia and Herzegovina
- Entity: Republika Srpska
- Municipality: Gacko
- Time zone: UTC+1 (CET)
  - Summer (DST): UTC+2 (CEST)

Pržine (Serbian Cyrillic: Пржине) is a village in the municipality of Gacko, Republika Srpska, Bosnia and Herzegovina.
