= Milan Bulajić =

Serbian historian and Yugoslavian diplomat

Milan Bulajić (Serbian Cyrillic: Милан Булајић; 6 September 1928 – 29 November 2009) was a Serbian historian, expert in Holocaust studies, and Yugoslavian diplomat. He was one of the founders of the Museum of Genocide Victims and The Fund for Genocide Research (Fond za istraživanje genocida) in Belgrade.

Bulajić was born in Vilusi near Nikšić (now in Montenegro), the son of an educated worker and grandson of a barjaktar (flag-bearer) in the Montenegrin Army and later government deputy. He joined the Yugoslav Partisans at the start of World War II. He finished the law faculty in Belgrade in 1951 and received a master's degree at the journalist-diplomat school in 1952, as the best in class. He received a doctoral degree in 1953. In the period of 1949–1987 he worked as an envoy of the Ministry of Foreign Affairs. Among other roles, Bulajić served as an observer for Yugoslavia in the extradition proceedings against Ustaše minister Andrija Artuković as well as an expert witness in his subsequent trial as well as the trials of the assassinators of Yugoslav diplomat Vladimir Rolović. He was pensioned in 1987.

As a researcher, Bulajić promoted high figures for the number of victims of the Jasenovac concentration camp. According to sociologist Jovan Byford, Bulajić belonged to a group of authors whose works supported the Serbian side against the Croatian side in a "war of words" which became propaganda war after the involvement of various state ministries. These authors depicted the "genocidal nature" of Croatian nationalism, as well as the role of the Catholic church in the genocide committed in WWII, while denying the existence of any form of anti-Semitism in Serbia.

== Works ==
- Bulajić, Milan (1992). Tudjman's "Jasenovac Myth": Ustasha Crimes of Genocide. Belgrade: The Ministry of information of the Republic of Serbia.
- Bulajić, Milan (1994). Tudjman's "Jasenovac Myth": Genocide against Serbs, Jews and Gypsies. Belgrade: Stručna knjiga.
- Bulajić, Milan (1994). The Role of the Vatican in the break-up of the Yugoslav State: The Mission of the Vatican in the Independent State of Croatia. Ustashi Crimes of Genocide. Belgrade: Stručna knjiga.
- Bulajić, Milan (2002). Jasenovac: The Jewish-Serbian Holocaust (the role of the Vatican) in Nazi-Ustasha Croatia (1941-1945). Belgrade: Fund for Genocide Research, Stručna knjiga. ISBN 9788641902211.
- Bulajić, Milan (1992). Misija Vatikana u Nezavisnoj Državi Hrvatskoj: "Politika Stepinac" razbijanja jugoslovenske države i pokatoličavanja pravoslavnih Srba po cijenu genocida : stvaranje Civitas Dei--Antemurale Christianitatis. Politika. ISBN 9788676070411.
- Bulajić, Milan (1988). Ustaški zločini genocida i suđenje Andriji Artukoviću 1986. godine. Rad. ISBN 9788609001475.
