= Michael Phayer =

American historian (born 1935)

- Born: 1935 (age 90–91)

Academic background
- Education: LMU Munich

Academic work
- Discipline: History
- Sub-discipline: Modern European history
- Institutions: Marquette University
- Main interests: Holocaust
- Notable works: The Catholic Church and the Holocaust, 1930–1965 (2000)

Michael Phayer (born 1935) is an American historian and professor emeritus at Marquette University in Milwaukee and has written on 19th- and 20th-century European history and the Holocaust.

Phayer received his PhD from LMU Munich in 1968 and joined Marquette's Department of History in 1970. He became Professor in 1990 and retired in 2002. He was an Ida E. King Distinguished Visiting Scholar of Holocaust Studies at Stockton University. He has published numerous research articles and books relating to Nazi Germany, the Holocaust and the Catholic Church, including his most recent, Pius XII, the Holocaust, and the Cold War (2007). His previous work was The Catholic Church and the Holocaust, 1930–1965 (published in 2000).

== Bibliography ==
- Michael Phayer, Sexual Liberation and Religion in Nineteenth Century Europe, Totowa, NJ, Rowman and Littlefield, 1977.
- Michael Phayer, Protestant and Catholic Women in Nazi Germany, Detroit, Wayne State University Press, 1990.
- Michael Phayer and Eva Fleischner, Cries in the Night: Women Who Challenged the Holocaust, Kansas City, Sheed & Ward, 1997.
- Phayer, Michael (2000). The Catholic Church and the Holocaust, 1930–1965. Bloomington and Indianapolis: Indiana University Press. ISBN 9780253337252.
- Phayer, Michael (2008). Pius XII, the Holocaust, and the Cold War. Bloomington and Indianapolis: Indiana University Press. ISBN 9780253349309.
