= The Holocaust in the Independent State of Croatia =

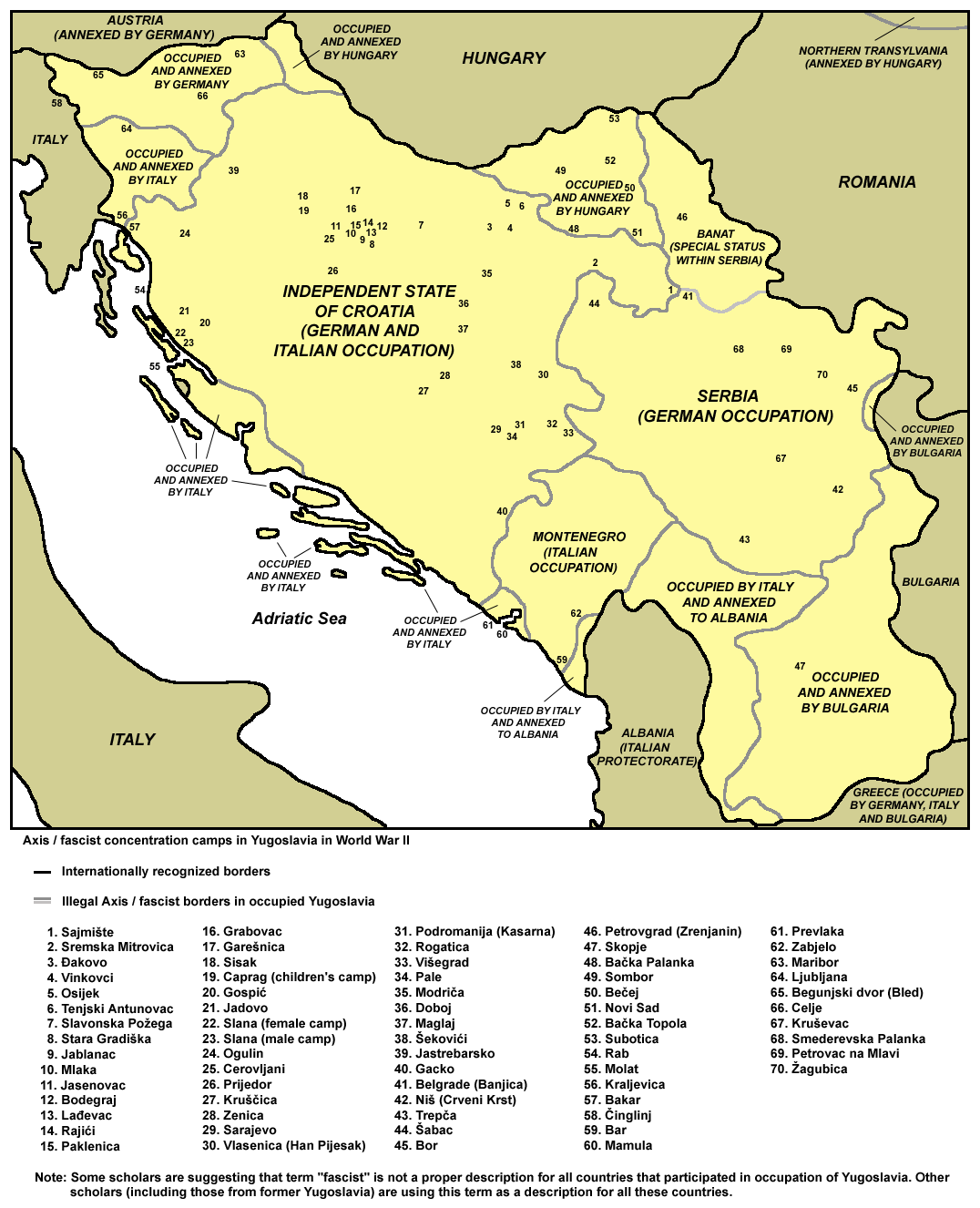
Concentration camps in the Independent State of Croatia on a map of all camps in Yugoslavia in World War II.

The Holocaust saw the genocide of Jews within the Independent State of Croatia (Croatian: Nezavisna Država Hrvatska, NDH), a fascist puppet state that existed during World War II, led by the Ustaše regime, which ruled an occupied area of Yugoslavia including most of the territory of modern-day Croatia, the whole of modern-day Bosnia and Herzegovina and the eastern part of Syrmia (Serbia). Of the 39,000 Jews who lived in the NDH in 1941, the United States Holocaust Memorial Museum states that more than 30,000 were murdered. Of these, 6,200 were shipped to Nazi Germany and the rest of them were murdered in the NDH, the vast majority in Croatian Ustaše-run concentration camps, such as Jasenovac. The Ustaše were the only quisling forces in Yugoslavia who operated their own extermination camps for the purpose of murdering Jews and members of other ethnic groups.

Of the minority, 9,000 Jews, who managed to survive, 50% of them did so by joining the Partisans or escaping to Partisan-controlled territory. The Partisans welcomed 10 Yugoslav Jews who were named National Heroes, the highest WWII award, including Jews from Croatia. Croatian civilians were also involved in saving Jews during this period. As of 2024, 133 Croats have been recognized as Righteous among the Nations.

== Background ==
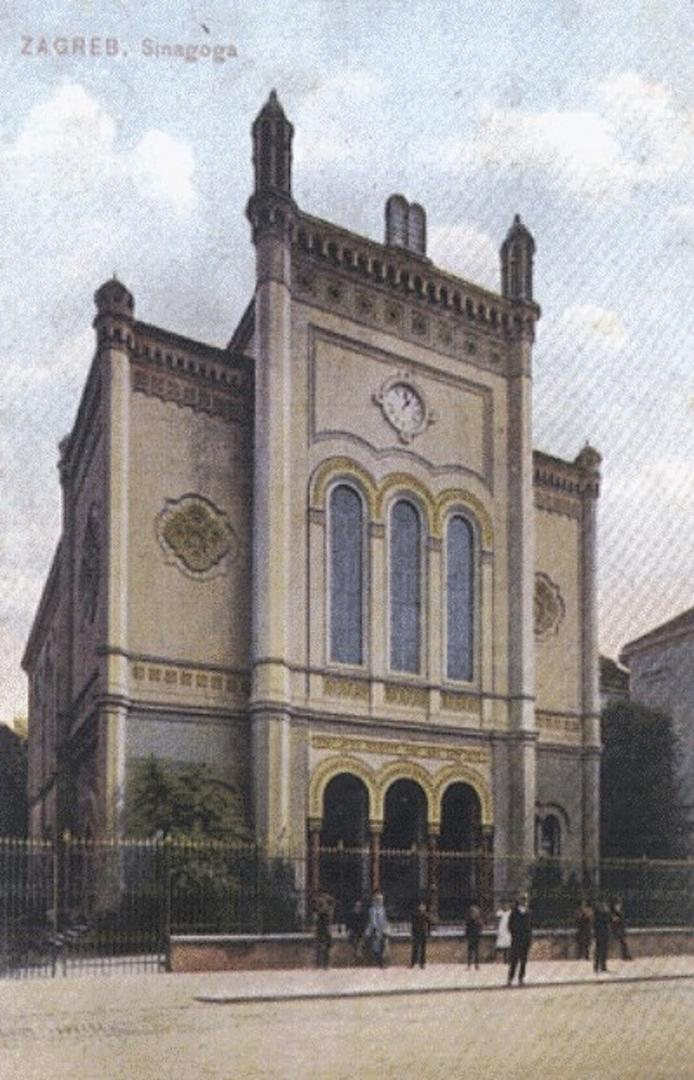
1906 postcard of Zagreb Synagogue, largest in Croatia, destroyed in 1941–1942.

During the 1930's antisemitism grew among the Croatian extreme right, including the fascist, separatist Ustaše, nationalist students and radical Catholic organizations. The Ustaše leader (Croatian: Poglavnik, equivalent of German Fuhrer), Ante Pavelić, identified Jews, along with Serbs, as the principal enemies of Croats, writing before the war:

Jews have robbed the Croatian people for centuries, especially the common man. They managed to acquire almost the entire Croatian national wealth. In an organized and systematic manner, they poisoned Croatian generations through press and books and denationalized them for years. In the future Independent State of Croatia, they will not be able to do this"

On 25 March 1941, Prince Paul of Yugoslavia signed the Tripartite Pact, allying the Kingdom of Yugoslavia with the Axis powers. Prince Paul was overthrown, and a new anti-German government under Peter II and Dušan Simović took power. The new government withdrew its support for the Axis, but it did not repudiate the Tripartite Pact. Nevertheless, Axis forces, led by Nazi Germany invaded Yugoslavia in April 1941.

The Independent State of Croatia was proclaimed by the Ustaše – a Croatian fascist organization – on 10 April 1941. Approximately 40,000 Jews lived within the new state, of whom only 9,000 would ultimately survive the war. On the territory of Yugoslavia the Ustaše were the only local quisling force which implemented its own Race Laws and carried out the mass-murder of Jews in their own concentration camps. In Serbia and elsewhere in occupied Yugoslavia the killing was carried out entirely by the Nazis. According to Jozo Tomasevich, of the 115 Jewish religious organizations in Yugoslavia which existed in 1940 only the one in Zagreb survived the war. About 11,500 Jews lived in Zagreb, 3,000 of whom survived the war. The historian Ivo Goldstein notes that 78% of Zagreb Jewish community members were killed in the NDH, with the Ustaše destruction of the Zagreb Synagogue being "the clearest announcement of [Ustaše] plans to completely annihilate Zagreb's Jews". While eliminating all other Jewish organizations, the Ustaše forced Zagreb's Jewish community to pay for transport to, and feeding of Jews in Ustaše concentration camps, while stealing much of the aid.

A special case was the 14,000-strong Sephardic Jewish community in Bosnia, which fled the Spanish Inquisition in 1492, and then settled in Bosnia under the Ottoman Empire, surviving and thriving for nearly 400 years under the Ottomans, Austria-Hungary and the Kingdom of Yugoslavia, until the great majority were exterminated by the Ustaše and Nazis in the Independent State of Croatia. The Ustaše and Nazis also exterminated Jews in Serbia, in annexed eastern Syrmia. Thus nearly all 450 Jews in the city of Ruma were killed in the Ustaše Jasenovac and Nazi Sajmište concentration camps, with the Independent State of Croatia confiscating all their property.

Already prior to the war the Ustaše forged close ties to fascist Italy and Nazi Germany. In 1933 the Ustaše presented "The Seventeen Principles", which proclaimed the uniqueness of the Croatian nation, promoted collective rights over individual rights, and declared that people who were not Croat by race and blood, would be excluded from political life. In 1936, the Ustaše leader, Ante Pavelić, wrote in "The Croat Question":

″Today, practically all finance and nearly all commerce in Croatia is in Jewish hands. This became possible only through the support of the state, which thereby seeks, on one hand, to strengthen the pro-Serbian Jews, and on the other, to weaken Croat national strength. The Jews celebrated the establishment of the so-called Yugoslav state with great joy, because a national Croatia could never be as useful to them as a multi-national Yugoslavia; for in national chaos lies the power of the Jews... In fact, as the Jews had foreseen, Yugoslavia became, in consequence of the corruption of official life in Serbia, a true Eldorado of Jewry...The entire press in Croatia is also in Jewish-masonic hands…"

== The Holocaust ==
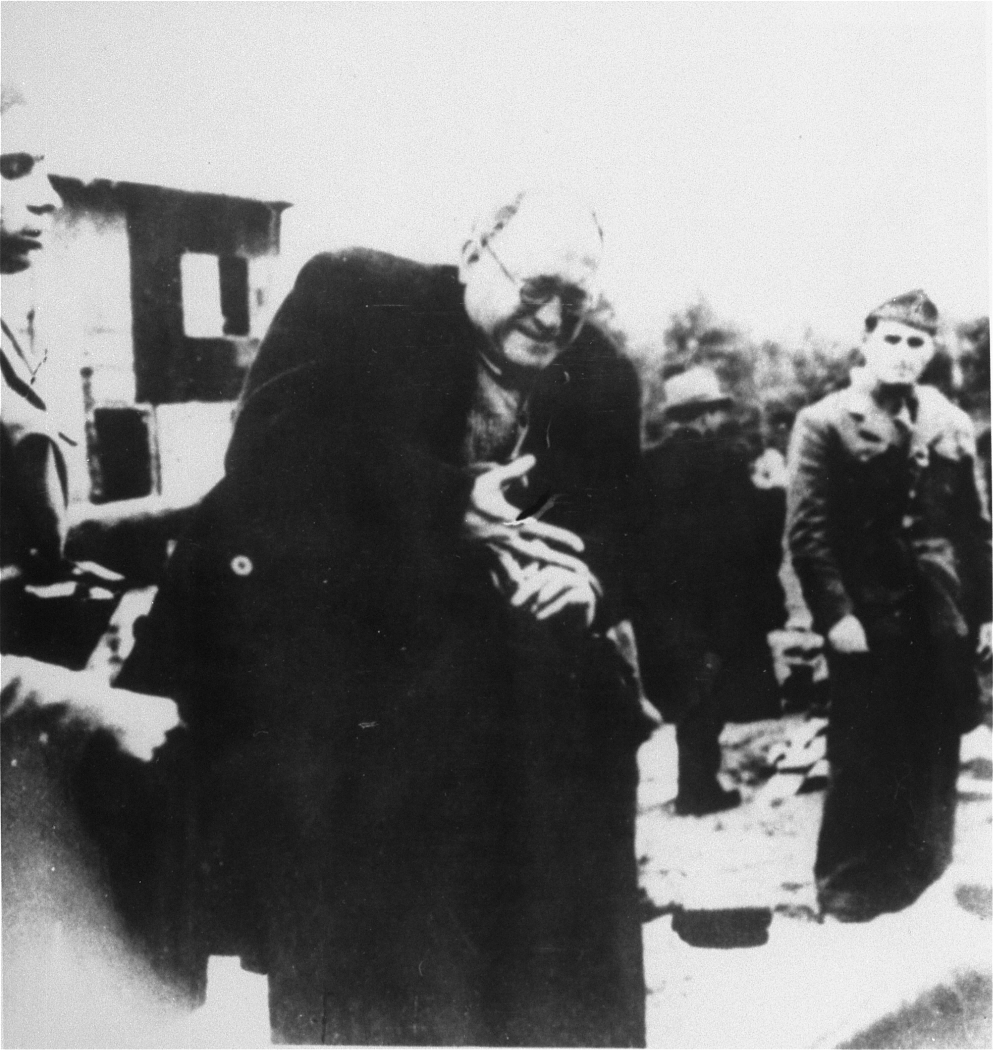
A Jewish prisoner is forced to remove his ring upon arrival in the Jasenovac concentration camp.

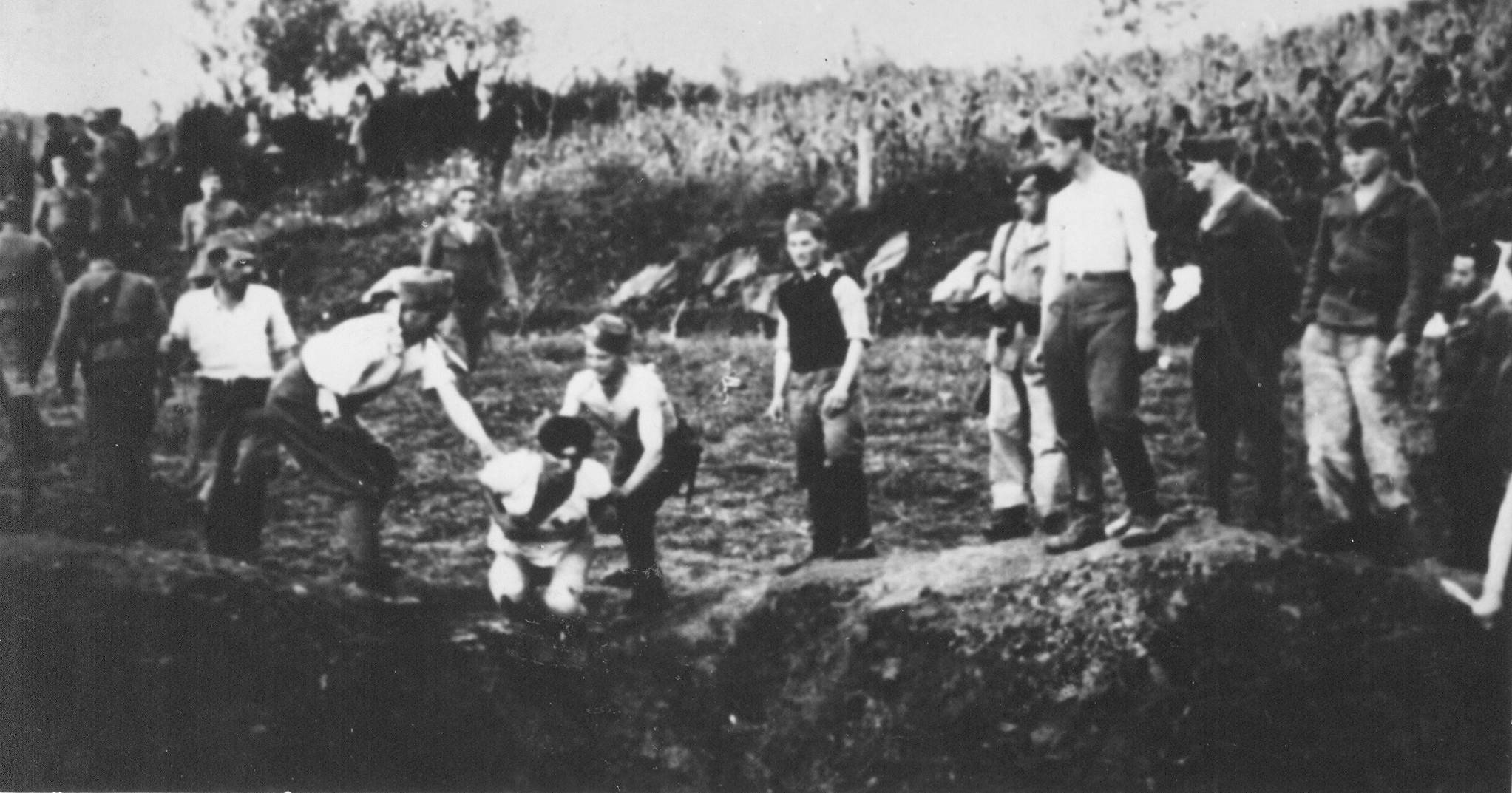
Ustaše executing people over a mass grave near Jasenovac.

=== Antisemitic legislation and start of persecution ===
The main Race Laws in the Independent State of Croatia, patterned after Nazi Race Laws, were adopted and signed by the Ustaše leader Ante Pavelić on 30 April 1941: the "Legal Decree on Racial Origins", the "Legal Decree on the Protection of Aryan Blood and the Honor of the Croatian People", and the "Legal Provision on Citizenship". These decrees defined who was a Jew, and took away the citizenship rights of all Jews and Roma. By the end of April 1941, months before the Nazis implemented similar measures in Germany, the Ustaše required all Jews to wear insignia, typically a yellow Star of David.

On June 26, 1941 Ante Pavelić issued the Extraordinary Legal Decree and Order, stating: "Since Jews are spreading false reports with the purpose of disturbing the population, and using their well-known speculations to hinder and obstruct supplying the population, we consider them collectively responsible and shall therefore treat them accordingly and place them, in addition to implementing penal and correctional measures, in open-air prison camps". This was the signal for the mass deportations of Jews to Ustaše concentration camps, promoted with media campaigns, under the main slogan: "There is no room for Jews in the Independent State of Croatia". On 10 October 1941, the Ustaše proclaimed the "Legal Decree on the Nationalization of the Property of Jews and Jewish Companies", confiscating all Jewish property.

Actions against Jews began immediately after the Independent State of Croatia was founded. On 10–11 April 1941 a group of prominent Jews in Zagreb was arrested by the Ustaše and held for ransom. On 13 April the same was done in Osijek, where Ustaše and Volksdeutscher mobs destroyed the synagogue and Jewish graveyard. The procedure of arresting and holding Jews for large ransoms was repeated in 1941 and 1942 several times with groups of Jews, while large-scale deportations of Jews to Ustaše concentration camps were also soon initiated.

=== Antisemitic propaganda ===
The Ustaše immediately initiated intensive antisemitic propaganda. A day after the signing of the main race laws on 30 April 1941, the newspaper of the Ustaše movement, Hrvatski narod (Croatian Nation), published across its entire front page: "The Blood and Honor of the Croatian people protected by special provisions".

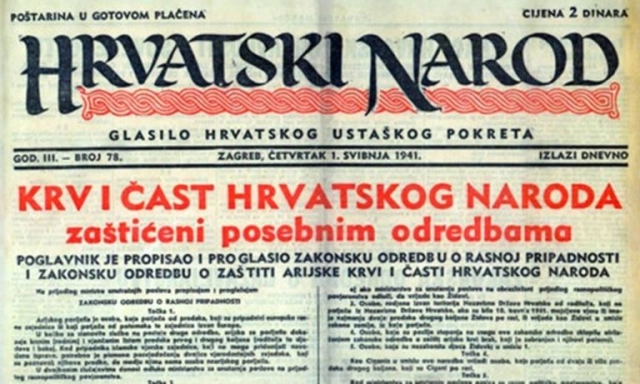
Ustashe newspaper proclaims NDH Race Laws, noting that The Leader, Ante Pavelić, signed legal provisions on racial affiliation and the protection of Aryan blood and honor of the Croatian people

Two days later, the newspaper Novi list concluded that Croatians must "be more alert than any other ethnic group to protect their racial purity, ... We need to keep our blood clean of the Jews". The newspaper also wrote that Jews are synonymous with "treachery, cheating, greed, immorality and foreignness", and therefore "wide swaths of the Croatian people always despised the Jews and felt towards them natural revulsion". Nova Hrvatska (New Croatia) added that according to the Talmud, "this toxic, hot well-spring of Jewish wickedness and malice, the Jew is even free to kill Gentiles".

One of the main claims of Ustaše propaganda was that the Jews have always been against an independent Croatian state and against the Croatian people. In April 1941 the newspaper Hrvatski narod accused Jews of being responsible for the "many failures and misfortunes of so many Croatian people", which led the Poglavnik [the Ustaše leader Ante Pavelic] to "eradicate these evils". A Spremnost article stated that the Ustaša movement defines "Judaism as one of the greatest enemies of the people".

Some in the Catholic Church joined the antisemitic propaganda. The Roman Catholic Bishop of Sarajevo, Ivan Šarić, published in his diocesan newspaper that "the movement to free the world of Jews, represents the movement for the restoration of human dignity. Omniscient and omnipotent God is behind this movement ". In July 1941, a Franciscan priest, Dionysius Juričev, wrote in Novi list that "it is no longer a sin to kill a seven year-old child".

=== Ustaše concentration camps ===
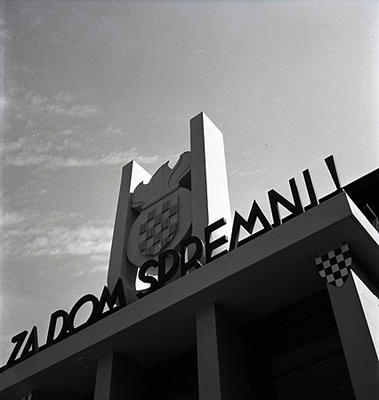
The Ustaše transit camp in the old Zagreb Fairgrounds from which many Jews were shipped to Ustaše and Nazi death camps

Already in April 1941, the Ustaše established the concentration camps Danica (near Koprivnica), Kruščica concentration camp near Travnik and Kerestinec, where along with communists and other political opponents, the Ustaše imprisoned Jews.

In May 1941, the Ustaše rounded up 165 Jewish youth in Zagreb, ages 17–25, most of them members of the Jewish sports club Makabi, and sent them to the Danica concentration camp (all but 3 were killed by the Ustaše).

In May and June the Ustaše established new camps, primarily for Jews who came to Croatia as refugees from Germany and countries which Germany had previously occupied, and some of these were quickly killed. Also arrested and sent to the Ustaše camps were larger groups of Jews from Zagreb (June 22), Bihac (June 24), Karlovac (June 27), Sarajevo, Varaždin, Bjelovar, etc.

==== Gospić-Jadovno-Pag Island camps ====
On 8 July 1941 the Ustaše ordered that all arrested Jews be sent to Gospić, from where they took the victims to death camps Jadovno on Velebit, and Slana and Metajna on the island of Pag, where they carried out mass executions. As part of this, on July 12, 1941, the Ustaše arrested all the Varaždin Jews and sent them to the Gospič concentration camp. In a report in the newspaper Hrvatski narod (Croatian People) the Ustaše proclaimed Varaždin the first Judenfrei city, i.e. "cleansed" of Jews.

The historian Paul Mojzes lists 1,998 Jews, 38,010 Serbs, and 88 Croats killed at Jadovno and related execution grounds, among them 1,000 children. Other sources generally offer a range of 10,000–68,000 deaths at the Jadovno system of camps, with estimates of the number of Jewish victims ranging from several hundred to 2,500–2,800. The bodies of victims were thrown into deep ravines and pits near the camp.

The Catholic Canon of Pag wrote that the Ustaše killed 12,000 in the Pag Island camps alone, "in all sorts of bestial ways", among them 4,000 women and children, and kept records of women they raped. Responding to local reports of masses of corpses across the Velebit mountains poisoning drinking water, an Italian army medical team uncovered many pits and mass graves of civilians across Velebit and on Pag Island. Since Ustaše mass-murder fueled Partisan resistance, the Italians forced the Ustaše in August 1941 to withdraw from their occupation zone, closing the Gospić-Jadovno-Pag Island system of extermination camps.

==== Jasenovac-Stara Gradiška ====
In August 1941 the Ustaše established the Jasenovac concentration camp, one of the largest in Europe. This included the Stara Gradiška concentration camp for women and children. Jasenovac was much more barbaric than German Nazi-run camps, since prisoners were often tortured and many of the murders were done manually using hammers, axes and knives. The United States Holocaust Memorial Museum (USHMM) in Washington, D.C. presently estimates that the Ustaša regime murdered between 77,000 and 99,000 people in Jasenovac system of camps between 1941 and 1945. The Jasenovac Memorial Site quotes a similar figure of between 80,000 and 100,000 victims. Of these, the United States Holocaust Museum says that at least 20,000 were Jews.

The Jasenovac Memorial site lists the individual names of 83,145 victims, including 13,116 Jews, 16,173 Roma, 47,627 Serbs, 4,255 Croats, 1,128 Bosnian Muslims, etc. Of the total 83,145 named Jasenovac victims, 20,101 were children under the age of 12, and 23,474 were women.

==== Other Ustaše concentration camps ====
The system of camps the Ustaše created to collect, hold and transport Jews to Ustaše and Nazi death camps, included the following:

- Zagreb transit camps. The first transit camp was created in June 1941 in the Zagreb Fairgrounds on Savska street (current Zagreb Student Center). From here Ustaše sent 2,500 Jews to be murdered at the Jadovno-Pag Island camps in June–August 1941. Since passerby could see what was going on, the Ustaše established Zavratnica camp in remote eastern Zagreb, to ship many Zagreb Jews to Jasenovac
- Kruščica, near Vitez in Bosnia was a transit camp in which the Ustaše held 3,000 to 5,000 prisoners, 90% of them Bosnian Jews, after the Italians closed down the Jadovno-Pag Island system of Ustaše death camps. Most of these prisoners were later transferred to Djakovo, Loborgrad and Jasenovac concentration camps.
- Đakovo. The Ustaše established Djakovo concentration camp in Fall of 1941. It held 3,800 Jewish women and children, mainly from Sarajevo, but also from Zagreb and elsewhere. The women and children were starved and beaten. 800 of them died in the camp. In June 1942, 3,000 remaining Jewish women and children were shipped to Jasenovac, where the Ustaše murdered them with extreme cruelty.
- Loborgrad. This concentration camp held 1,700 Jewish and 300 Serb women and children, of whom 300 children. Many were shipped there from the Ustaše Krušica camp, plus some directly from Zagreb. Up to 200 died in the camp because of mistreatment and disease. In August 1942 the Ustaše handed over all the surviving Jewish children and women to the Germans, who took them to Auschwitz.
- Tenja near Osijek. The Ustaše forced the local Jewish community to finance and build with forced labor their own concentration camp. 3,000 Jews from Osijek and surrounding areas were brought there in June 1942. Due to overcrowding and lack of food, conditions in the camp were extremely unbearable. In August 1942 all Jews from the camp were transferred to Jasenovac and Auschwitz.

==== Jews sent to Nazi camps ====
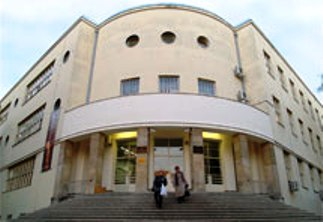
Classical Gymnasium in Zagreb, where the Ustaše held 1,200 Zagreb Jews in August 1942, before shipping them to Auschwitz

The Ustaše repeatedly asked the Nazis to ship NDH Jews to eastern Europe, the first request made in October 1941. The Germans initially refused, and the first shipments of NDH Jews began only in August 1942, fully a year after the Ustaše had been mass-murdering Jews in their own concentration camps. Data on numbers of NDH Jews sent to Nazi camps are provided by money the Ustaše state paid the Nazis for each Jew transported to German extermination camps, in return for Ustaše confiscating Jewish properties. Thus according to statistics from Himmler's SS headquarters, in all 1942 the NDH paid the Nazis to ship 4,927 NDH Jews to German death camps.

Of these, Zagreb police arrested 1,700 Jews in August 1942, amid intense antisemitic propaganda in the Ustaše press. The Ustaše held most of them in the Križančeva street Classical Gymnasium Zagreb, then marched them to the Main Zagreb Railway Station, and shipped them to Auschwitz. The rest of the 4,927 were shipped to Germany from the Ustaše concentration camps at Tenja and Loborgrad. Data indicate 1,200 additional Jews arrested by Ustaše and Nazis and shipped to Germany via Ustaše transit camps in the final deportations of May 1943, for a total of 6,200 (there were no deportations after, since most NDH Jews were killed by then, and in 1941 Jews were deported and killed only in Ustaše death camps).

These 6,200 NDH Jews deported to Germany (some of whom survived) compare with estimates of 30,000 total Jewish victims in the NDH, confirming Zerjavić and others who estimate the large majority of NDH Jews were killed by the Ustaše, most by August 1942. As a result, at a meeting in Ukraine in September 1942, the Ustaše leader Ante Pavelić told Adolf Hitler that the "Jewish question is practically solved in a large part of Croatia."

=== Other events ===
The destruction of the Sephardi Il Kal Grande synagogue in Sarajevo was carried out by Nazi German soldiers and their local Ustaše allies soon after their arrival in the city on 15 April. The Sarajevo Haggadah was the most important artifact which survived this period, smuggled out of Sarajevo and saved from the Nazis and Ustaše by the chief librarian of the National Museum, Derviš Korkut. The demolition of the Zagreb Synagogue was ordered by the Ustaše mayor Ivan Werner and was carried out from 10 October 1941 to April 1942. The two Jewish football clubs in the state, ŽGiŠK Makabi Zagreb and ŽŠK Makabi Osijek, were banned in 1941.

In April 1942, the Jews of Osijek were forced to build a "Jewish settlement" at Tenja, into which they were herded along with Jews from the surrounding region. Approximately 3,000 Jews were moved to Tenja in June and July 1942. From Tenja, 200 Jews were transported to the Jasenovac concentration camp and 2,800 Jews were transported to the Auschwitz concentration camp.

In February 1942 the Ustaše Interior Minister, Andrija Artuković, in a speech to the Croatian Parliament declared that:

"The Independent State of Croatia through its decisive action has solved the so-called Jewish question ... This necessary cleansing procedure finds its justification not only from a moral, religious and social point of view, but also from the national-political point of view: it is international Jewry associated with international communism and Freemasonry, that sought and still seeks to destroy the Croatian people". The speech was accompanied by shouts of approval -" yes! - from the parliamentary benches.

On 5 May 1943, Nazi SS leader Heinrich Himmler paid a short visit to Zagreb in which he held talks with Ante Pavelić. Starting on 7 May, a roundup of the remaining Jews in Zagreb was carried out by the Gestapo under the command of Franz Abromeit. During this period, Archbishop Stepinac offered the head rabbi in Zagreb Miroslav Šalom Freiberger help to escape the roundup, which he ultimately declined. The operation lasted for the following week, and resulted in the capture of 1,700 Jews from Zagreb and 300 from the surrounding area. All of these people were taken to the Auschwitz concentration camp.

After the capitulation of Italy on 8 September 1943, Nazi Germany annexed the Croat-populated Italian provinces of Pula and Rijeka into its Operational Zone Adriatic Coast. On 25 January 1944, the Germans demolished the Jewish synagogue in Rijeka. The region of Međimurje had been annexed by the Kingdom of Hungary in 1941. In April 1944, the Jews of Međimurje were taken to a camp in Nagykanizsa where they were held until their transport to Auschwitz. An estimated 540 Međimurje Jews were murdered at Auschwitz, while 29 were murdered at Jasenovac.

== Other ethnicities ==
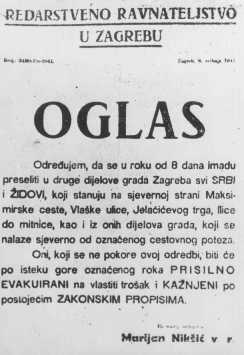
Order for Serbs and Jews to move out of their homes in specified parts of Zagreb to other parts of the city, Croatia and a warning of forcible expulsion and punishment of those that failed to comply.

=== Serbs ===
Many historians describe the Ustaša regime's mass killings of Serbs as meeting the definition of genocide. Some racist laws, brought from Germany, in addition to Jews and Roma, were applied to the Serbs. Vladimir Žerjavić estimates that 322,000 Serbs were killed in the Independent State of Croatia, out of a total population of 1.8 million Serbs. Thus one in six Serbs were killed, which represents the highest percentage killed in Europe, after the Jews and Roma. Of these Žerjavić estimates that about 78,000 Serbs were killed at Jasenovac and other Ustaše camps. According to the United States Holocaust Memorial Museum in Washington, D.C., between 320,000 and 340,000 Serbs were killed in the NDH.

=== Roma ===
The Ustaše regime launched the persecution of the Roma in May 1942. Whole families were arrested and transported to the Jasenovac concentration camp, where they were immediately, or within a few months, killed. Estimates of the number of victims vary from 16,000 (this figure is given Vladimir Žerjavić) to 40,000. The Jasenovac Memorial at Jasenovac, Croatia lists the names of 16,173 Roma killed at that concentration camp. Due to their way of life, many more victims are probably unrecorded. The German historian Alexander Korb and the United States Holocaust Memorial Museum in Washington, D.C., both estimate at least 25,000 casualties among the Roma, which represents nearly the total Roma population in the Independent State of Croatia.

.

== Number of victims ==
The United States Holocaust Memorial Museum lists the following number of victims in the Independent State of Croatia:

- 32,000 Jews, with 12,000 to 20,000 Jews killed in the Jasenovac network of camps
- At least 25,000 Roma, or virtually the entire Roma population in the Independent State of Croatia
- Between 320,000 and 340,000 Serbs, most killed by the Ustaše authorities

Slavko Goldstein estimates that approximately 30,000 Jews were killed in the Independent State of Croatia. Vladimir Žerjavić's demographics research produced an estimate of 25,800 to 26,700 Jewish victims, of which he estimates that 19,000 were killed by the Ustaše in Croatia and Bosnia, and the rest were killed abroad.

Of Zagreb's prewar Jewish community, with its 9,467 members, data collected by the Jewish Community of Zagreb shows that only 2,214 of its members managed to survive, which means that 78% of them were killed in the Holocaust. After the war, some 60% of the surviving Yugoslav Jews emigrated to Israel. According to Naida Michal Brandl number of surviving Jews from Zagreb was between 2,214 and more than 3,000. Israeli data shows that out of a total prewar population of 39,000 Jews in what became the Independent State of Croatia, only 3,694 Jews managed to survive the Holocaust and emigrate to Israel – 2,747 from Croatia plus 947 from Bosnia.

=== Survivors ===
According to Marica Karakaš Obradov, it is estimated that number of surviving Jews from the NDH was in range of 9,000 to 12,000 persons while according to Slavko Goldstein that number is 11,589 Jews. Some 5,000 NDH Jews managed to escape the Ustaše-Nazi portion of the NDH, to Italian-held NDH territory, from where the Italians had expelled the Ustaše, after the Ustaše mass-murder of 24,000, mostly Serbs, but also 2,500 Jews in the Jadovno – Pag Island system of concentration camps, in July–August 1941, because this Ustaše slaughter fueled Partisan resistance. All these Jews were held in Italian internment camps, most, 3,500, on Rab Island. Following Italian capitulation, the area was taken over by Nazis and Ustaše, and some Jews were captured and killed, thus not all 5,000 survived (plus the 5,000 figure included some Jews from Serbia who escaped to Italian territory, thus not all survivors were NDH Jews).

The largest number managed to survive by joining the Partisans. Of the 3,500 Jews in the Italian Rab Island camp, 3,151 joined the Partisans (1,339 as combatants, 1,812 as noncombatants), of whom 2,874 survived the war, the rest were killed in Ustaše and Nazi attacks. Altogether in Croatia and Bosnia 3,143 NDH Jews joined the Partisans, of whom 804 were killed, and 2,339 managed to survive. An additional 2,000 Jewish noncombatants managed to survive by escaping to Partisan territory, for a total of 4,339 Jews saved by the Partisans, or nearly half the 9,000 Jewish survivors in the NDH. Proportionately this represented "the largest Jewish participation in resistance movements in Europe, and also proportionately the largest number of Jews saved by anti-Fascist resistance".

The post-war Yugoslav commissions estimated that between 25,000 and 26,000 Jews were murdered in the NDH's concentration camps alone. However, the total number of Jews who lived in the NDH in April 1941 was only 39,000 (according to Romano's estimate in 1980). Thousands of them were deported to German concentration camps in Eastern Europe, thousands of others fled to areas which were under Italian control, and thousands of others joined the Partisans and survived the Holocaust, according to Jozo Tomasevich, such a high death toll is statistically impossible.

Ivo Goldstein's more recent work contradicts Tomasevich, noting how 4,339 Jews survived with the Partisans. 5,000 escaped to Italian territory, but of these, 3,500 Rab Island Jews either survived by joining the partisans, or were killed by the Ustaše-Nazis. This leaves at most 1,500 additional non-Rab Island Jews in Italian territory. Adding this 1,500 to 4,339 Jews who survived with the Partisans, gives a maximum of 5,839 Jews who survived with the Partisans and/or on Italian territory (of the 1,500, Prof. Goldstein states some were also killed by Ustaše-Nazis, and Jews on Italian territory included some non-NDH Jews, thus fewer than 5,839 total NDH Jews survived this way). Adding to 5,839 the 6,000 – 7,000 NDH Jews shipped to Germany by Ustaše-Nazis.

== Concentration camps ==
- Jadovno concentration camp
- Jasenovac concentration camp
- Sisak children's concentration camp
- Stara Gradiška concentration camp
- Lobor concentration camp
- Sajmište concentration camp (run by German forces in Serbia)
- Tenja concentration camp

== Notable people ==
=== Victims ===
- Kalmi Baruh, Bosnian Jewish scholar
- Berta Bergman, Bosnian Jewish physician
- Antun Blažić, Croatian Jewish partisan
- Laura Papo Bohoreta, Bosnian Jewish feminist writer and Ladino scholar
- Magda Bošković, Croatian Jewish women's rights movement activist and partisan
- Slavko Brill, Croatian Jewish sculptor
- Lea Deutsch, Croatian Jewish child actress
- Mavro Frankfurter, Croatian Jewish rabbi
- Izidor Gross, Croatian chess master and hazzan
- Beno Heisz, rabbi of the Sisak Synagogue
- Slavko Hirsch, Croatian Jewish physician
- Žiga Hirschler, Croatian Jewish composer and music critic
- Ivica Hiršl, Croatian politician
- Daniel Kabiljo, Bosnian Jewish artist
- Izrael Kohn, rabbi of the Koprivnica Synagogue
- Ivan Korski, Croatian Jewish engineer, member of the KPJ
- Ignjat Lang, lawyer, President of the Jewish Community of Vinkovci
- Leo Müller, Croatian Jewish entrepreneur
- Edmund Moster, Croatian Jewish entrepreneur
- Daniel Ozmo, Bosnian Jewish painter
- Ivan Rein, Croatian painter
- Zvonimir Richtmann, Croatian writer
- Rod Riffler, Croatian Jewish dance teacher
- Viktor Rosenzweig, Croatian poet and Communist
- Aleksandar Savić, Croatian communist
- Izrael Scher, rabbi of the Vukovar Synagogue
- Armin Schreiner, Croatian Jewish industrialist
- Rikard Schwarz, Croatian Jewish composer and conductor
- Vlado Singer, politician, Ustaše activist
- Sava Šumanović, Serb painter
- Simon Ungar, Hungarian-born rabbi
- Oton Vinski, Croatian Jewish banker
- Leib Weissberg, Ukrainian-born rabbi

=== Survivors ===
- Olga Hebrang (Communist, Partisan, wife of Andrija Hebrang - the Ustaše killed 54 of her Jewish family members and Jewish relatives)
- Esther Gitman
- Branko Lustig
- Isak Samokovlija
- Amiel Shomrony

=== Other ===
- Diana Budisavljević

== Help given by Croatians ==
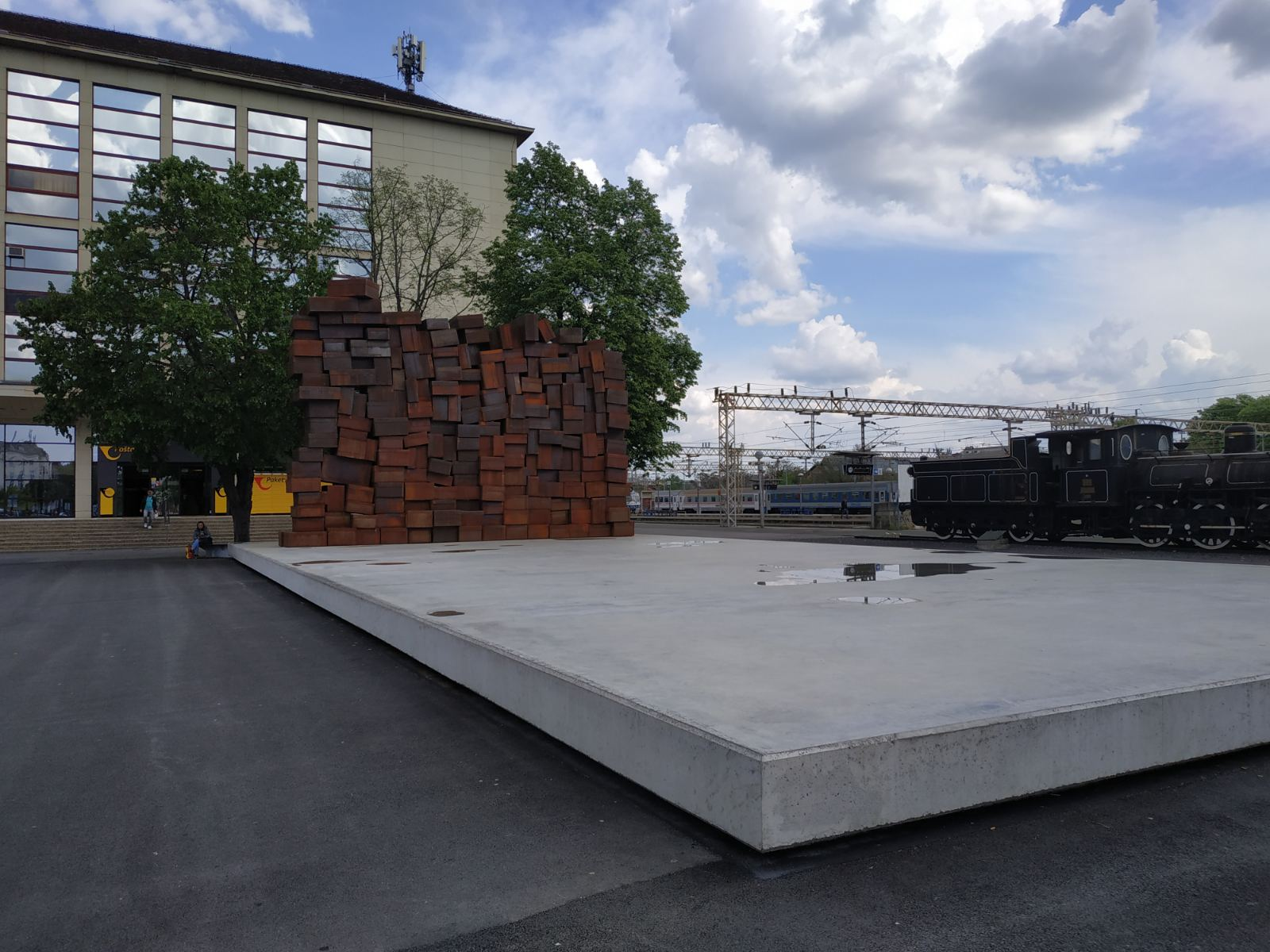
A Memorial dedicated to the victims of Holocaust and Ustaša regime in on Zagreb Main Railway Station. The Memorial represents the luggage taken away from the victims before they were transported to concentration camps.

Over one hundred Croatians have been recognized as Righteous among the Nations. They include Žarko Dolinar and Mate Ujević.

As of 1 February 2019, 118 Croatians have been honored with this title by Yad Vashem for saving Jews during World War II.

One of the Righteous, Sister Amadeja Pavlović (28 January 1895 – 26 November 1971), was the Superior of the Croatian province of the Sisters of Mercy of the Holy Cross in Đakovo from 1943 to 1955. She rescued Zdenka Grunbaum, then a ten-year-old girl from Osijek; Grunbaum's family was killed in Đakovo. Grunbaum later moved to America, and started the initiative to have Pavlović recognized as Righteous Among the Nations. Pavlović was recognized as Righteous Among the Nations by Yad Vashem in 2008; Croatian president Stjepan Mesić attended the ceremony.

47 people from Bosnia and Herzegovina have been recognized as Righteous among the Nations.

According to Holocaust historian Esther Gitman, Croatian Archbishop Alojzije Stepinac rescued approximately 1000 converted Jews.

== Revisionism in Croatia ==
Holocaust revisionism and denial in Croatia has been criticized by Menachem Z. Rosensaft in 2017 and William Echikson's Holocaust Remembrance Project report of 2019. Representatives of Serbian and Jewish communities along with anti-fascist organisations have boycotted state commemoration services for Jasenovac victims in protest at what they see as government leniency towards Ustaša sympathisers.

In 2018, Croatian journalist Igor Vukić wrote a book on the Jasenovac concentration camp entitled Radni logor Jasenovac (Jasenovac Labour Camp) that advanced the theory that Jasenovac was simply a labour camp where no mass murder took place. In referencing the book, Croatian journalist Milan Ivkošić wrote a column for the Croatian daily newspaper Večernji list entitled "Jasenovac cleansed of ideology, bias and communist forgery" where he declared that "there was fun in the camp. There were sporting matches, especially football, concerts, theatrical performances, among which were pieces that were created by the inmates themselves." One of Croatian Radiotelevision's programme editors Karolina Vidović Krišto covered the book's release in a talk show, in which the historian Hrvoje Klasić was supposed to be present, but he had explicitly rejected the invitation because of Jasenovac denialism, and the institution subsequently published a disclaimer, saying they do not advocate any such views and that all their employees are supposed to do their work objectively and legally. Krišto was reportedly subsequently removed from her post, and later entered politics as a candidate of the Miroslav Škoro Homeland Movement.

== See also ==
- Ante Pavelić
- Mile Budak
- Miroslav Filipović
- Catholic clergy involvement with the Ustaše
- Croatia–Serbia relations
- The Holocaust in German-occupied Serbia
- World War II in Yugoslavia

== Sources ==
- Bartulin, Nevenko (2008). "The Ideology of Nation and Race: The Croatian Ustasha Regime and its Policies toward the Serbs in the Independent State of Croatia 1941-1945". Croatian Studies Review. 5: 75–102.
- Bulajić, Milan (1992). Tudjman's "Jasenovac Myth": Ustasha Crimes of Genocide. Belgrade: The Ministry of information of the Republic of Serbia.
- Bulajić, Milan (1994). Tudjman's "Jasenovac Myth": Genocide against Serbs, Jews and Gypsies. Belgrade: Stručna knjiga.
- Bulajić, Milan (1994). The Role of the Vatican in the break-up of the Yugoslav State: The Mission of the Vatican in the Independent State of Croatia. Ustashi Crimes of Genocide. Belgrade: Stručna knjiga.
- Bulajić, Milan (2002). Jasenovac: The Jewish-Serbian Holocaust (the role of the Vatican) in Nazi-Ustasha Croatia (1941-1945). Belgrade: Fund for Genocide Research, Stručna knjiga. ISBN 978-86-419-0221-1.
- Cvetković, Dragan (2011). "Holokaust u Nezavisnoj Državi Hrvatskoj - numeričko određenje". Istorija 20. Veka: Časopis Instituta za Savremenu Istoriju. 29 (1): 163–182. doi:10.29362/ist20veka.2011.1.cve.163-182.
- Dedijer, Vladimir (1992). The Yugoslav Auschwitz and the Vatican: The Croatian Massacre of the Serbs During World War II. Amherst: Prometheus Books. ISBN 978-0-87975-752-6.
- Goldstein, Ivo; Goldstein, Slavko (2016). The Holocaust in Croatia. University of Pittsburgh Press. ISBN 978-0-82294-451-5.
- Hory, Ladislaus; Broszat, Martin (1964). Der kroatische Ustascha-Staat1941-1945. Stuttgart: Deutsche Verlags-Anstalt.
- Kolstø, Pål (2011). "The Serbian-Croatian Controversy over Jasenovac". Serbia and the Serbs in World War Two. Palgrave Macmillan UK. pp. 225–246. ISBN 978-0-230-34781-6.
- Korb, Alexander (2010). "A Multipronged Attack: Ustaša Persecution of Serbs, Jews, and Roma in Wartime Croatia". Eradicating Differences: The Treatment of Minorities in Nazi-Dominated Europe. Newcastle upon Tyne: Cambridge Scholars Publishing. pp. 145–163. ISBN 978-1-4438-2449-1.
- Levy, Michele Frucht (2011). "'The Last Bullet for the Last Serb': The Ustaša Genocide against Serbs: 1941–1945". Crimes of State Past and Present: Government-Sponsored Atrocities and International Legal Responses. Routledge. pp. 54–84. ISBN 978-1-317-98682-9.
- Lituchy, Barry M., ed. (2006). Jasenovac and the Holocaust in Yugoslavia: Analyses and Survivor Testimonies. New York: Jasenovac Research Institute. ISBN 978-0-9753432-0-3.
- McCormick, Robert B. (2014). Croatia Under Ante Pavelić: America, the Ustaše and Croatian Genocide. London-New York: I.B. Tauris. ISBN 978-1-78076-712-3.
- Mojzes, Paul (2008). "The Genocidal Twentieth Century in the Balkans". Confronting Genocide: Judaism, Christianity, Islam. Lanham: Lexington Books. pp. 151–182. ISBN 978-0-7391-3589-1.
- Mojzes, Paul (2011). Balkan Genocides: Holocaust and Ethnic Cleansing in the 20th Century. Lanham: Rowman & Littlefield. ISBN 978-1-4422-0663-2.
- Novak, Viktor (2011). Magnum Crimen: Half a Century of Clericalism in Croatia. Vol. 1. Jagodina: Gambit. ISBN 978-86-7624-049-4.
- Novak, Viktor (2011). Magnum Crimen: Half a Century of Clericalism in Croatia. Vol. 2. Jagodina: Gambit. ISBN 978-86-7624-049-4.
- Paris, Edmond (1961). Genocide in Satellite Croatia, 1941-1945: A Record of Racial and Religious Persecutions and Massacres. Chicago: American Institute for Balkan Affairs.
- Pavlowitch, Stevan K. (2008). Hitler's New Disorder: The Second World War in Yugoslavia. New York: Columbia University Press. ISBN 978-0-231-70050-4.
- Phayer, Michael (2000). The Catholic Church and the Holocaust, 1930–1965. Bloomington and Indianapolis: Indiana University Press. ISBN 0-253-21471-8.
- Phayer, Michael (2008). Pius XII, the Holocaust, and the Cold War. Bloomington and Indianapolis: Indiana University Press. ISBN 978-0-253-34930-9.
- Rivelli, Marco Aurelio (1998). Le génocide occulté: État Indépendant de Croatie 1941–1945 [Hidden Genocide: The Independent State of Croatia 1941–1945] (in French). Lausanne: L'age d'Homme. ISBN 978-2-8251-1152-9.
- Rivelli, Marco Aurelio (1999). L'arcivescovo del genocidio: Monsignor Stepinac, il Vaticano e la dittatura ustascia in Croazia, 1941-1945 [The Archbishop of Genocide: Monsignor Stepinac, the Vatican and the Ustaše dictatorship in Croatia, 1941-1945] (in Italian). Milano: Kaos. ISBN 978-88-7953-079-8.
- Rivelli, Marco Aurelio (2002). "Dio è con noi!": La Chiesa di Pio XII complice del nazifascismo ["God is with us!": The Church of Pius XII accomplice to Nazi Fascism] (in Italian). Milano: Kaos. ISBN 978-88-7953-104-7.
- Tomasevich, Jozo (2001). War and Revolution in Yugoslavia, 1941–1945: Occupation and Collaboration. Stanford: Stanford University Press. ISBN 978-0-8047-7924-1.
- Yeomans, Rory (2013). Visions of Annihilation: The Ustasha Regime and the Cultural Politics of Fascism, 1941-1945. Pittsburgh: University of Pittsburgh Press. ISBN 978-0-8229-7793-3.
