= Concentration camps in the Independent State of Croatia =

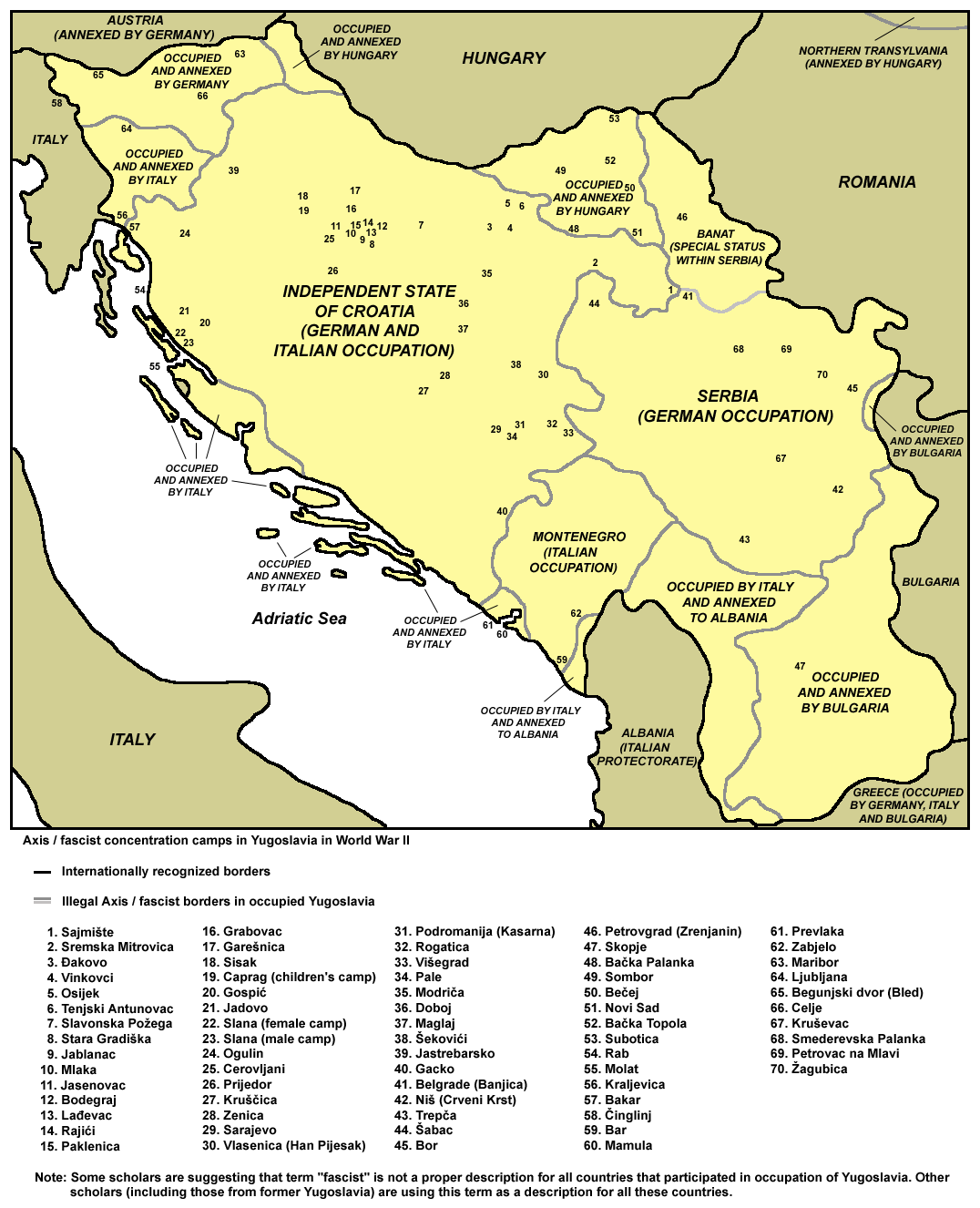
The concentration camps in the Independent State of Croatia are marked 1 through 40 on this map of concentration camps in Yugoslavia in World War II. The two camps in annexed territories are marked 54 and 55.

During World War II, numerous concentration camps existed in the Independent State of Croatia. Most of them were operated by the Croatian Ustaša authorities, but some of them were operated by Nazi Germany and Fascist Italy.

== Ustaša-operated camps ==
Camp	Location	Operational	number of prisoners	number of deaths
Jasenovac (I–IV)	Jasenovac, Slavonia	23 August 1941 – 22 April 1945	100,000+	c. 100,000 (Note: These numbers vary widely, and were frequently manipulated by various sides during Yugoslavia's history, see Jasenovac concentration camp.)
Stara Gradiška (Jasenovac V)	Stara Gradiška, Slavonia	1941–1945	12,790+	9,586+
Đakovo	Đakovo, Slavonia	1 December 1941 – 7 July 1942	3,000	at least 516 or 650
Tenja	Tenja, Osijek, Slavonia	March 1942–August 1942	3,000 Jews	
Sisak	Sisak, Banovina	August 1942–January 1943	6,693 children, mostly Serbs	at least 1152 or 1630
Gospić	Gospić, Lika	June–August 1941		42,246
Jadovno	Gospić, Lika	1941–August 1941		10,000–68,000
Lepoglava	Lepoglava, northern Croatia	1941–1945	2,000+ political	at least 961 youngsters and 80 other inmates
Danica	Koprivnica, northern Croatia	15 April 1941–July 1941	5,600	
Lobor	Lobor, northern Croatia	9 August 1941–November 1942	2,000+ women and children, mostly Jews and Serbs	200+
Kerestinec	Kerestinec, Zagreb	1941–1945		
Jastrebarsko	Jastrebarsko, Zagreb	1942–		1,500 children
Slana	Pag, Dalmatia	June 1941–August 1941	16,000	4–12,000 or 8,500
Metajna	Pag, Dalmatia	1941–1945		
Kruščica (Vitez)	Vitez, central Bosnia	1941–Late September 1941		3000
Gornja Rijeka	Gornja Rijeka, northern Croatia	1941–1942	400+	at least 140

== Chetnik-operated camps ==
- Kosovo polje

== German-operated camps ==
- Sajmište concentration camp
- Sisak concentration camp
- Vinkovci
- Jankomir

== Italian-operated camps ==
- Kraljevica
- Brač
- Hvar
- Gruž
- Kupari
- Lopud

=== In annexed territories ===
- Molat concentration camp
- Rab concentration camp

== See also ==
- List of massacres in the Independent State of Croatia
- Persecution of Serbs in the Independent State of Croatia
- The Holocaust in the Independent State of Croatia

== Sources ==
Books

- Deverić, Mišo; Fumić, Ivan (2008). Hrvatska u logorima, 1941-1945. Savez antifašističkih boraca i antifašista Republike Hrvatske. ISBN 978-953-7587-01-7.
- Hilberg, Raul (2003). The destruction of the European Jews (3rd ed.). New Haven, CT: Yale University Press. ISBN 9780300095579.
- Israeli, Raphael (19 February 2013). The Death Camps of Croatia: Visions and Revisions, 1941-1945. Transaction Publishers. ISBN 978-1-4128-4975-3.
- Korb, Alexander (2010). "A Multipronged Attack: Ustaša Persecution of Serbs, Jews, and Roma in Wartime Croatia". Eradicating Differences: The Treatment of Minorities in Nazi-Dominated Europe. Newcastle upon Tyne: Cambridge Scholars Publishing. pp. 145–163. ISBN 9781443824491.
- Peršen, Mirko (1990). Ustaški logori. Globus. ISBN 978-86-343-0547-0.
- Tomasevich, Jozo (2001). War and Revolution in Yugoslavia, 1941–1945: Occupation and Collaboration. Stanford: Stanford University Press. ISBN 9780804779241.
- Yeomans, Rory (2015). The Utopia of Terror: Life and Death in Wartime Croatia. Boydell & Brewer. ISBN 978-1-58046-545-8.

Journals

- Cvetković, Dragan (2011). "Holokaust u Nezavisnoj Državi Hrvatskoj - numeričko određenje" [Holocaust in Independent State of Croatia]. Istorija 20. Veka: Časopis Instituta za savremenu istoriju. 29 (1): 163–182. doi:10.29362/ist20veka.2011.1.cve.163-182.

Conference papers and proceedings

- SANU (1995). Genocid nad Srbima u II svetskom ratu. Muzej žrtava genocida i Srpska književna zadruga.
- Schindley, Wanda; Makara, Petar, eds. (2005). Jasenovac: Proceedings of the First International Conference and Exhibit on the Jasenovac Concentration Camps. Dallas Publishing. ISBN 9780912011646.
