= Bocarić =

Bocarić (Serbian Cyrillic: Боцарић) is a Serbian surname. Notable people with the surname include:

- Anastas Bocarić (1864–1944), Serbian painter
- Špiro Bocarić (1876–1941), Serbian painter, brother of Anastas
