= Mihovil Pavlek Miškina =

Mihovil Pavlek – Miškina
- Born: 24 September 1887; Đelekovec, Kingdom of Croatia-Slavonia
- Died: 30 June 1942 (aged 54); Jasenovac, Independent State of Croatia
- Occupations: Poet, short story writer and politician
- Writing career
- Language: Croatian
- Genre: Poetry

Mihovil Pavlek – Miškina (1887– 1942) was a Croatian poet, short story writer and politician. He was a member of the Croatian Peasant Party and an opponent of the Ustaša regime.

Pavlek was born in Đelekovec, at the time in the Kingdom of Croatia-Slavonia. His work usually embraced Socialist ideas and protested against injustice. The pseudonym "Miškina" was adopted later when he started participating in some literary activities of Yugoslavia, and labeled a "peasant writer" some time after. He supported the election of Ivica Hiršl for Mayor of Koprivnica in 1939. He was executed at the Jasenovac concentration camp in the Independent State of Croatia in 1942.

Today, there are elementary schools in Zagreb and Đelekovec named after Pavlek.

== Sources ==
=== References ===
- "Opća enciklopedija", Zagreb, 1980.
- "Mala enciklopedija Prosveta", Belgrade, 1978.
- Miškina: "Trakavica", Zagreb, 1946.
- Šime Vučetić: "Mihovil Pavlek Miškina" u 115. knjizi edicije "Pet stoljeća hrvatske književnosti", Zagreb, 1985.
- Jovan Nedić: "Pavlek", "Skandifeniks", ..., 277, 16 - Rijeka, 2004
