= Danica concentration camp =

Croatian concentration camp

- Concentration and extermination camp
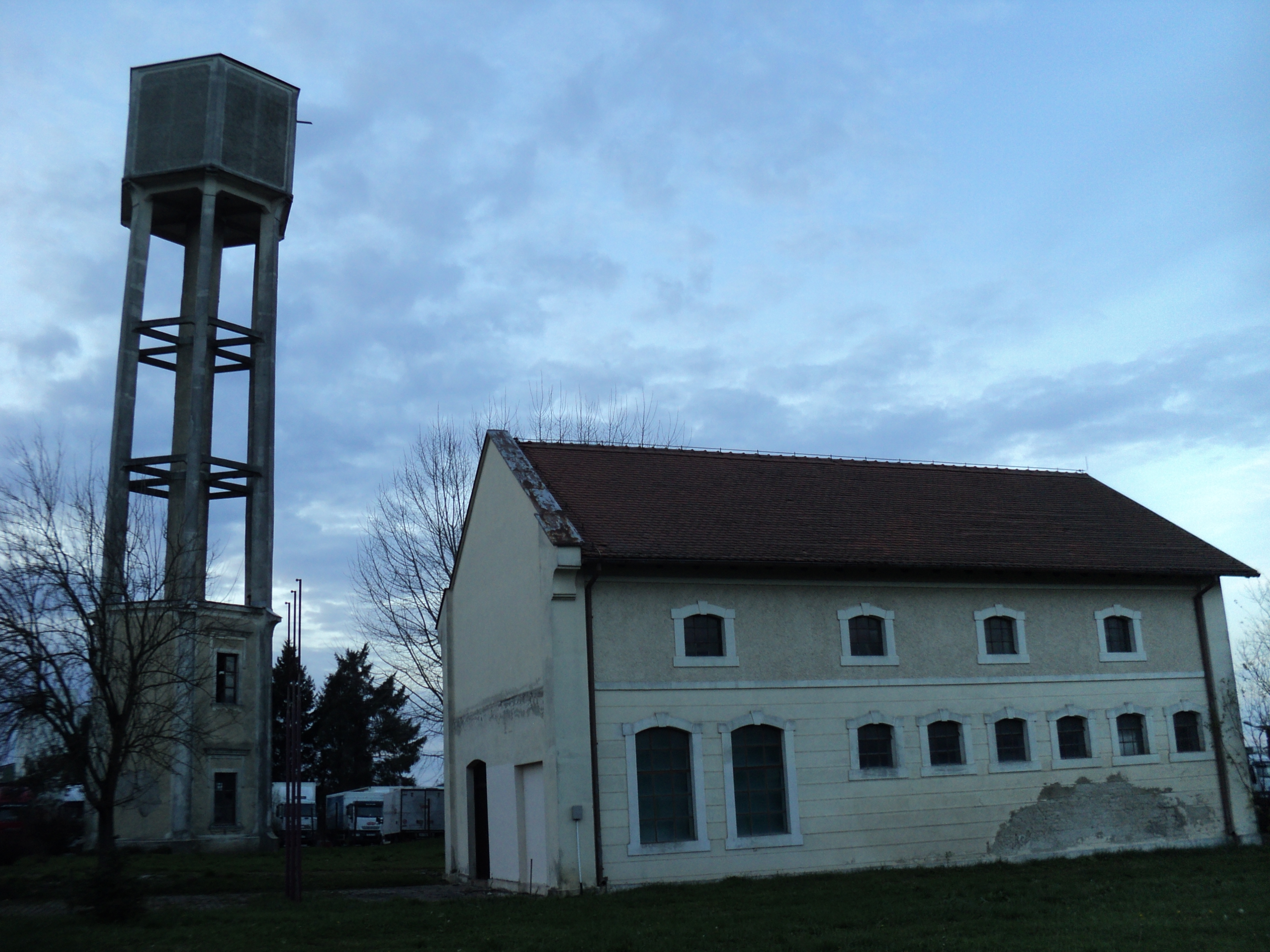
- The memorial museum and guard tower of Danica Memorial Area
- Coordinates: 46°9′36″N 16°49′48″E
- Location: Koprivnica, Independent State of Croatia (now Croatia)
- Built by: Mijo Babić, the first commander of all concentration camps in the Independent State of Croatia
- Operated by: Independent State of Croatia
- Operational: April 1941–1945
- Number of inmates: 5,000 most of them being Serbs followed by Croat communists, Jews and Romani people
- Notable inmates: Zlatko Prica; Aleksandar Savić; Rada Vranješević

Danica was the first concentration and extermination camp established in the Independent State of Croatia during World War II. It was established in Koprivnica (located in modern-day Croatia) on 15 or 20 April 1941 in the deserted building of former fertilizer factory "Danica". Mijo Babić participated in preparations for the establishment of Danica concentration camp. The first individual inmates were brought to Danica on 18 April 1941 while first groups arrived at the end of April 1941.

The Jews from Zagreb were transported to Danica and Jadovno early in May 1941. Those transported to Danica were all killed by July 1941, while those transported to Jadovno were all killed by August 1941. Already in June 1941 there were 2,000 inmates in Danica, most of them being Serbs followed by Croat communists, Jews and Romani people. The number of inmates reached 5,000 including 500 Jews.

Four hundred Romani were transported to Danica camp, some of them executed in the camp.

== Sources ==
- Bulatović, Radomir (1990). Koncentracioni logor Jasenovac s posebnim osvrtom na Donju Gradinu: istorijsko-sociološka i antropološka studija. Svjetlost. ISBN 9788601018938.
- Goldstein, Ivo; Goldstein, Slavko (2001). Holokaust u Zagrebu. Novi liber. ISBN 9789536045198.
- Friedman, Jonathan C. (15 December 2010). The Routledge History of the Holocaust. Taylor & Francis. ISBN 978-1-136-87060-6.
- Council, United States Holocaust Memorial (1991). Days of remembrance, April 7-14, 1991: fifty years ago : from terror to systematic murder : planning guide. U.S. Holocaust Memorial Council.
