= Bogdan Tošović =

Croatian water polo player

Personal information
- Nationality: Croatian
- Born: 28 August 1918; Dubrovnik, Kingdom of Dalmatia, Austria-Hungary
- Died: August 1941 (aged 22–23); Gospić, Independent State of Croatia

Sport
- Sport: Water polo

Bogdan Tošović (28 August 1918 – August 1941) was a Croatian water polo player. He competed for Yugoslavia in the men's tournament at the 1936 Summer Olympics. He died in the Jadovno concentration camp.
