= Armin Schreiner =

Jewish Croatian industrialist killed in the Holocaust

- Born: 25 March 1874; Koprivnica, Austria-Hungary, (now Croatia)
- Died: 29 November 1941 (aged 67); Jasenovac concentration camp
- Cause of death: Murdered in Holocaust
- Occupation: Industrialist
- Spouse: Roza Schreiner
- Children: Ella; Mira; Arie; Hadumi; Ferdinand; Vladimir; Otto
- Parent(s): Yaakov and Khana Schreiner

Armin Mordekhai Schreiner (25 February 1874 – 29 November 1941) was influential Croatian industrialist, banker, Jewish activist and member of the first Freemasonry Jewish Lodge Zagreb No. 1090 independent order of B'nai B'rith.

Schreiner was born on 25 February 1874 to Yaakov and Khana Schreiner. He was Jewish, considered himself non-Zionists and was married to Roza Schreiner. He and his wife had six children; daughters Mira (b. 1915) and Ella (b. 1902), and sons; Leo (now Arie Aharoni, b. 1913), Ferdinand (b. 1901), Hadumi (b. 1908), Vladimir (b. 1909), and Otto (b. 1912). He was the owner of multiple factories, among them brick factory "Zagorka" (now "Tondach Hrvatska") in Bedekovčina. He was also the vice president of City Savings Bank of Zagreb and vice president of the "Industrialists Union".

Schreiner's family suffered terrible devastation during the Holocaust. Schreiner was killed at the Jasenovac concentration camp in 1941. His wife and daughter were killed in August 1941, at the Pag concentration camp. His son Vladimir was killed in 1941 at Jadovno concentration camp, son Otto in 1941 at Thessaloniki, and son Ferdinand, with his 7-year-old daughter Helga, in 1942 at the Auschwitz concentration camp. Schreiner son Arie and daughter Ella were the only one who survived the Holocaust.

== Bibliography ==
- Goldstein, Ivo (2001). Holokaust u Zagrebu. Zagreb: Novi Liber. ISBN 953-6045-19-2.
- Snješka Knežević, Aleksander Laslo (2011). Židovski Zagreb. Zagreb: AGM, Židovska općina Zagreb. ISBN 978-953-174-393-8.
- Goldstein, Ivo (2005). Židovi u Zagrebu 1918 - 1941. Zagreb: Novi Liber. ISBN 953-6045-23-0.
