= Aleksandar Savić =

Croatian communist activist and member of the partisan resistance movement

- Born: Alel Schwarz; 1923; Zagreb, Kingdom of Serbs, Croats and Slovenes
- Died: July 1941 (aged 17–18); Jadovno concentration camp, Independent State of Croatia
- Occupation: Student activist
- Relatives: Miroslav Savić (father); Ina Juhn-Broda (mother)

Aleksandar Savić (born Alel Schwarz; 1923 – 1941) was a Croatian communist activist and member of the partisan resistance movement in Croatia, murdered during the Holocaust in the Independent State of Croatia.

Savić was born in Zagreb to a Jewish family, the son of Miroslav Savić and Ina Juhn-Broda. His father changed the family surname from Schwarz to Savić due to the increasingly intense antisemitism in the 1930s.

Savić joined the Young Communist League of Yugoslavia - SKOJ (from Serbo-Croatian: Savez komunističke omladine Jugoslavije) during high school education. Savić was influenced by Beno Stein (a Croatian communist and medical internist, whose apartment was a favorite meeting place for leftist intellectuals) and his mother communist activities. Savić attended the gymnasium in Zagreb, where he led the SKOJ activities and was member of the SKOJ high school leadership in Zagreb.

Savić gathered the SKOJ advanced youth and held illegal meetings in his apartment. With the establishment of the Independent State of Croatia in 1941, he joined the resistance movement in Croatia. He participated in the writing of anti-fascist slogans and distribution of leaflets. On 24–25 May 1941, he was arrested with the group of 165 young Jewish men. He was deported to the Danica concentration camp near Koprivnica. Later he was deported to the Jadovno concentration camp where he was killed by Ustaše in July 1941; he was 17 or 18 years old.

== Bibliography ==
- Goldstein, Ivo (2005). Židovi u Zagrebu 1918-1941. Zagreb: Novi Liber. ISBN 953-6045-23-0.
- Kraus, Ognjen (1998). Dva stoljeća povijesti i kulture Židova u Zagrebu i Hrvatskoj. Zagreb: Židovska općina Zagreb. ISBN 953-96836-2-9.
- Goldstein, Ivo (2001). Holokaust u Zagrebu. Zagreb: Novi Liber. ISBN 953-6045-19-2.
- Romano, Jaša (1980). Jevreji Jugoslavije 1941–1945: žrtve genocida i učesnici narodnooslobodilačkog rata. Beograd: Jevrejski Istorijski Muzej, Saveza jevrejskih opština Jugoslavije.
- Gordiejew, Paul Benjamin (1999). Voices of Yugoslav Jewry. Albany, New York: State University of New York Press. ISBN 9781438404479.
