= Tenja concentration camp =

Internment camp run by the Ustaše in Croatia during World War II

Coordinates: 45°31′41″N 18°43′18″E

- Concentration camp
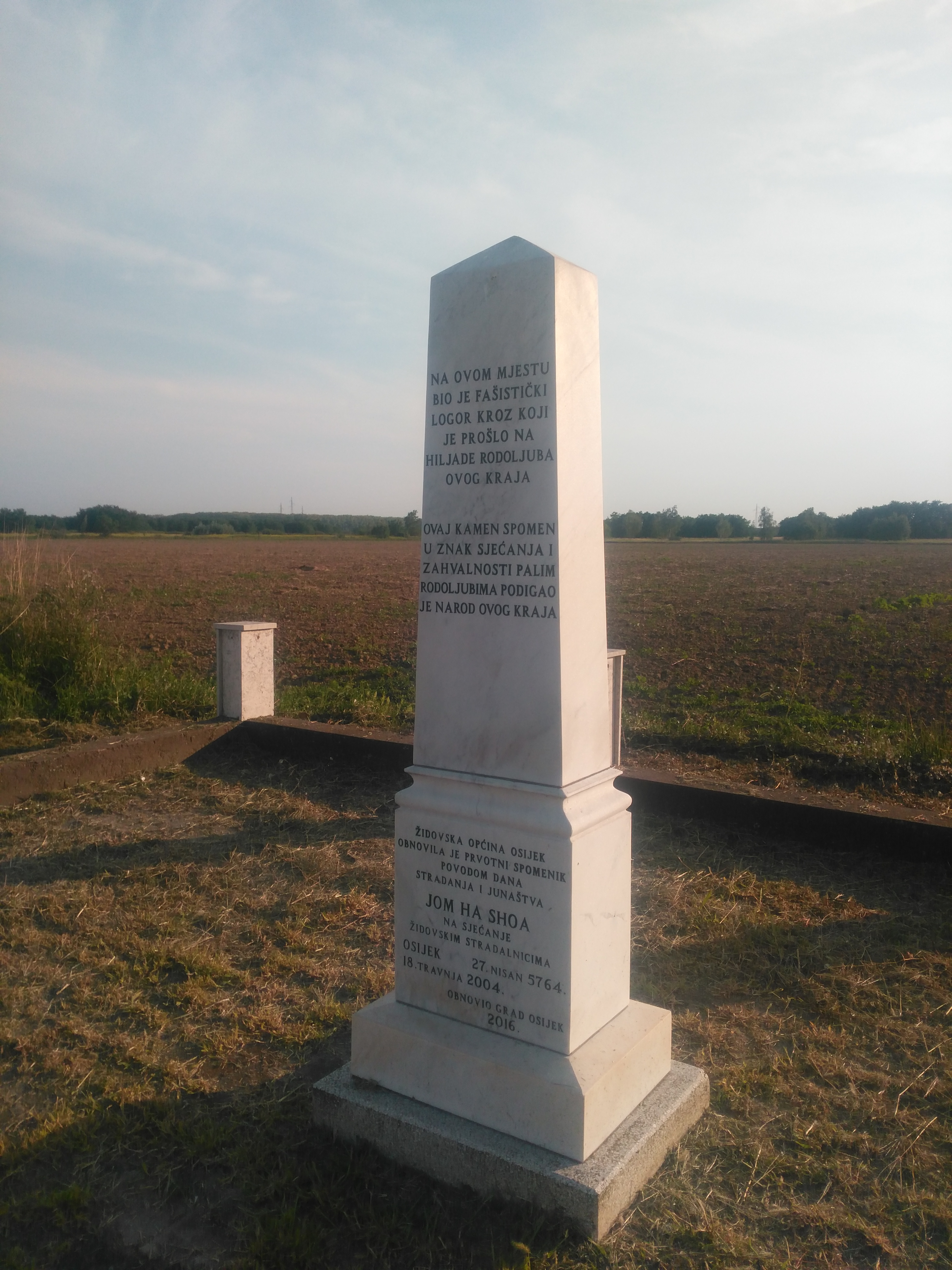
- Memorial between Tenja and Osijek, which was the location of the Tenja concentration camp for Jews in 1942

- Location within Croatia
- Location: Tenja, Independent State of Croatia (modern-day Croatia)
- Built by: Jews from Osijek and its surroundings
- Operated by: Ustaše, Independent State of Croatia
- Original use: Envelope factory Mursa Mill
- Operational: March 1942 — August 1942
- Inmates: Jews
- Number of inmates: 3,000

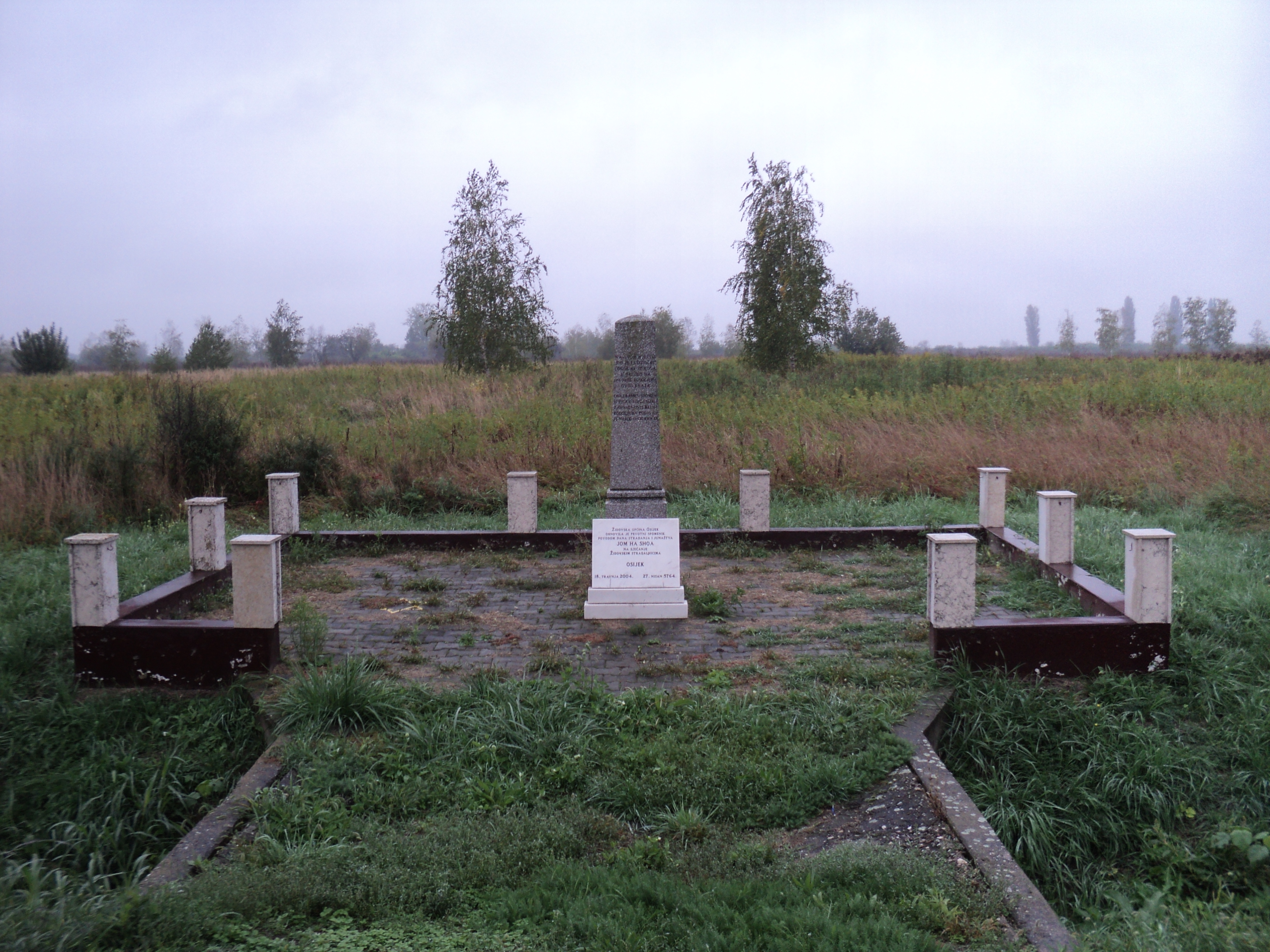
Monument before reconstruction.

The Tenja concentration camp (Croatian: Koncentracijski logor Tenja) was one of 26 concentration camps established in the Independent State of Croatia during World War II. It was located close to village of Tenja near Osijek and operated by Ustaše.

== Establishment ==
Similar to Terezin camp, the Tenja camp was not a concentration camp in its ordinary meaning of the word because it was planned to become a small settlement inhabited and governed by Jews. The decision to establish this concentration camp was made in January 1942 by Grand Župan of Baranja, Stjepan Heffer, the military and police headquarters of Baranja and city government who all planned deportation of Osijek Jews to Tenja as the final solution of Jewish question in Osijek and its surroundings.

The building of the settlement was completed in April 1942 with funds collected by Jewish municipality of Osijek Jewish Community. The camp included a building of the former envelope factory Mursa Mill used to accommodate very old and ill inmates.

== Disestablishment ==
Around 3,000 Jewish inmates were deported from Tenja to Auschwitz and Jasenovac. The first departure of 1,700 inmates was organized on 14 August 1942, second on 18 August and remaining inmates were deported at the end of August, some of them first to Lobor concentration camp and then to Auschwitz.

== Sources ==
- Gutman, Israel (1995). Encyclopedia of the Holocaust. Macmillan Library Reference USA. ISBN 978-0-02-864527-8.
- Steckel, Charles W. (1973). Destruction and Survival. Delmar Publishing Company.
- Jacobs, Steven L. (2009). Confronting Genocide: Judaism, Christianity, Islam. Lexington Books. ISBN 978-0-7391-3589-1.
- Sorić, Ante (1989). Jews in Yugoslavia. Muzejski prostor.
- Kenrick, Donald (2004). The Romani World: A Historical Dictionary of the Gypsies. University of Hertfordshire Press. ISBN 978-1-902806-26-6.
- Centar (1984). Zbornik Centra za drustvena istrazivanja Slavonije i Baranje. Centar za drustvena istrazivanja Slavonije i Baranje.
- Dakina, Gojo Riste (1994). Genocide Over the Serbs in the Independent State of Croatia: Be Catholic Or Die. Institute of Contemporary History. ISBN 9788674030585.
- Živaković-Kerže, Zlata (2006). Stradanja i pamćenja: Holokaust u Osijeku i život koji se nastavlja. Židovska općina Osijek. ISBN 978-953-6659-24-1.
