= Špiro Bocarić =

Serb painter killed in Jadovno concentration camp

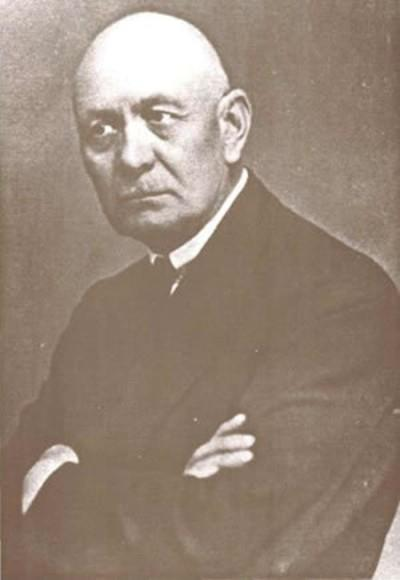
- Born: Spiridon Bocarić; 24 May 1876; Budva, Montenegro
- Died: 19 July 1941 (aged 65); Jadovno concentration camp, Independent State of Croatia
- Known for: Painting
- Movement: Pointillism

Spiridon "Špiro" Bocarić (Serbian Cyrillic: Спиридон Шпиро Боцарић; 24 May 1876 – 19 July 1941) was a Serb painter.

== Biography ==
In addition to a large number of portraits, he also painted several compositions featuring scenes from national history.

Bocarić was also one of the pioneers of cinematography of modern-day Bosnia and Herzegovina.

Špiro Bocarić was one of the founders of the Rotary Club Banja Luka (1934) and its president (1937–1941).

He was killed during the Genocide of Serbs by fascist Ustashe regime on 19 July 1941 at the Jadovno concentration camp near Gospić and his body was thrown in the Šaran pit.

== Gallery ==
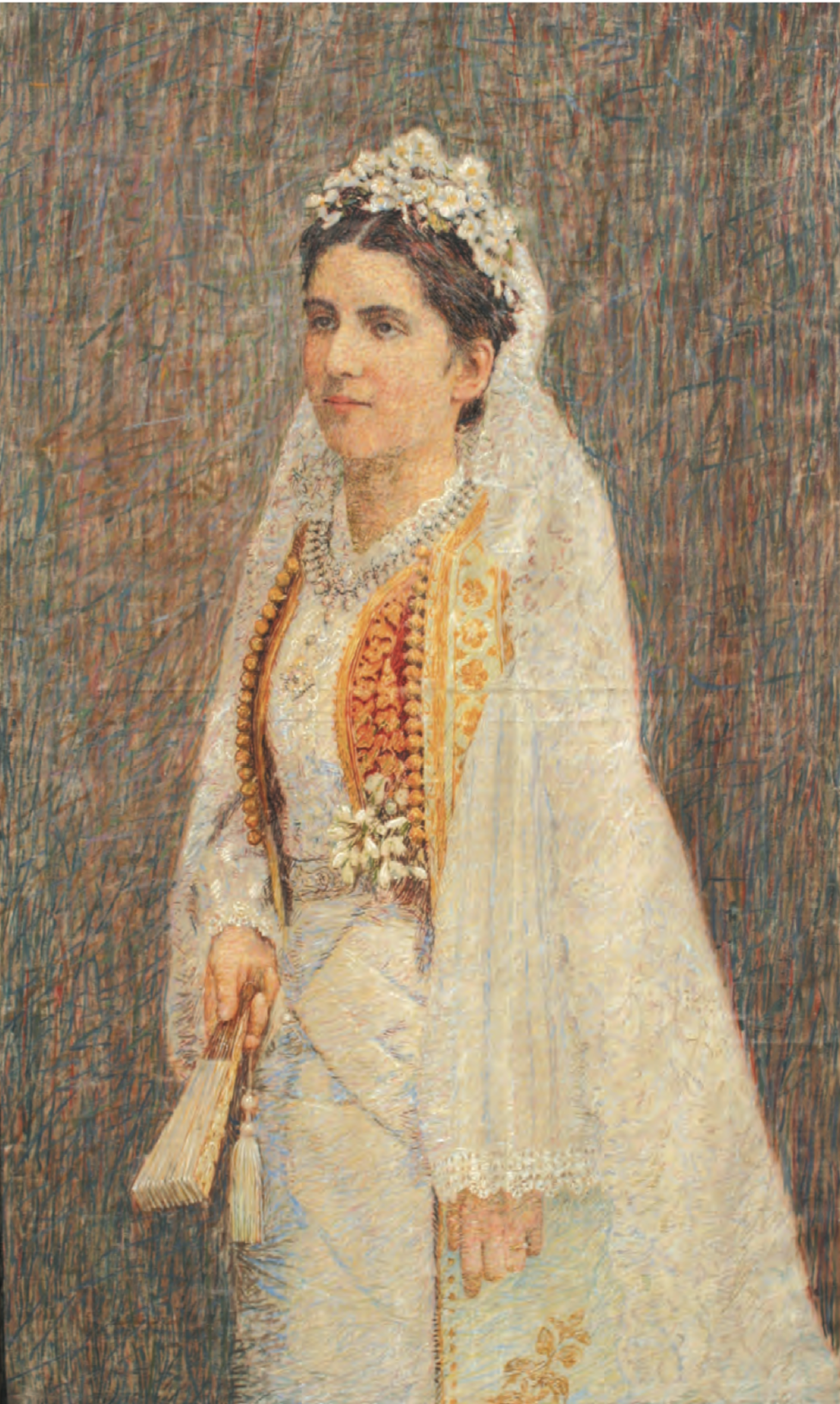
Princess Zorka of Montenegro, National Museum of Niš, 1883.

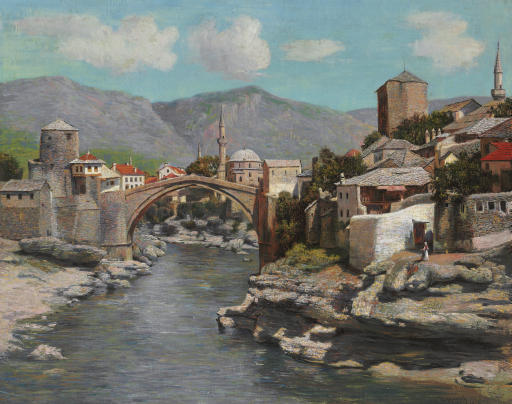
The Old Bridge in Mostar, 1909

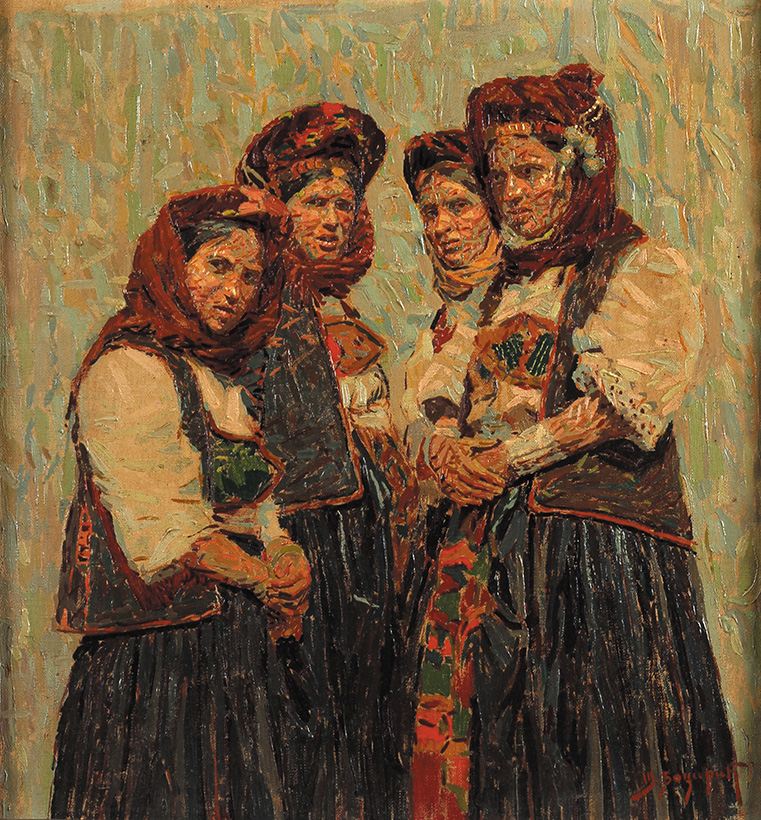
Girls in folk costumes, 1915

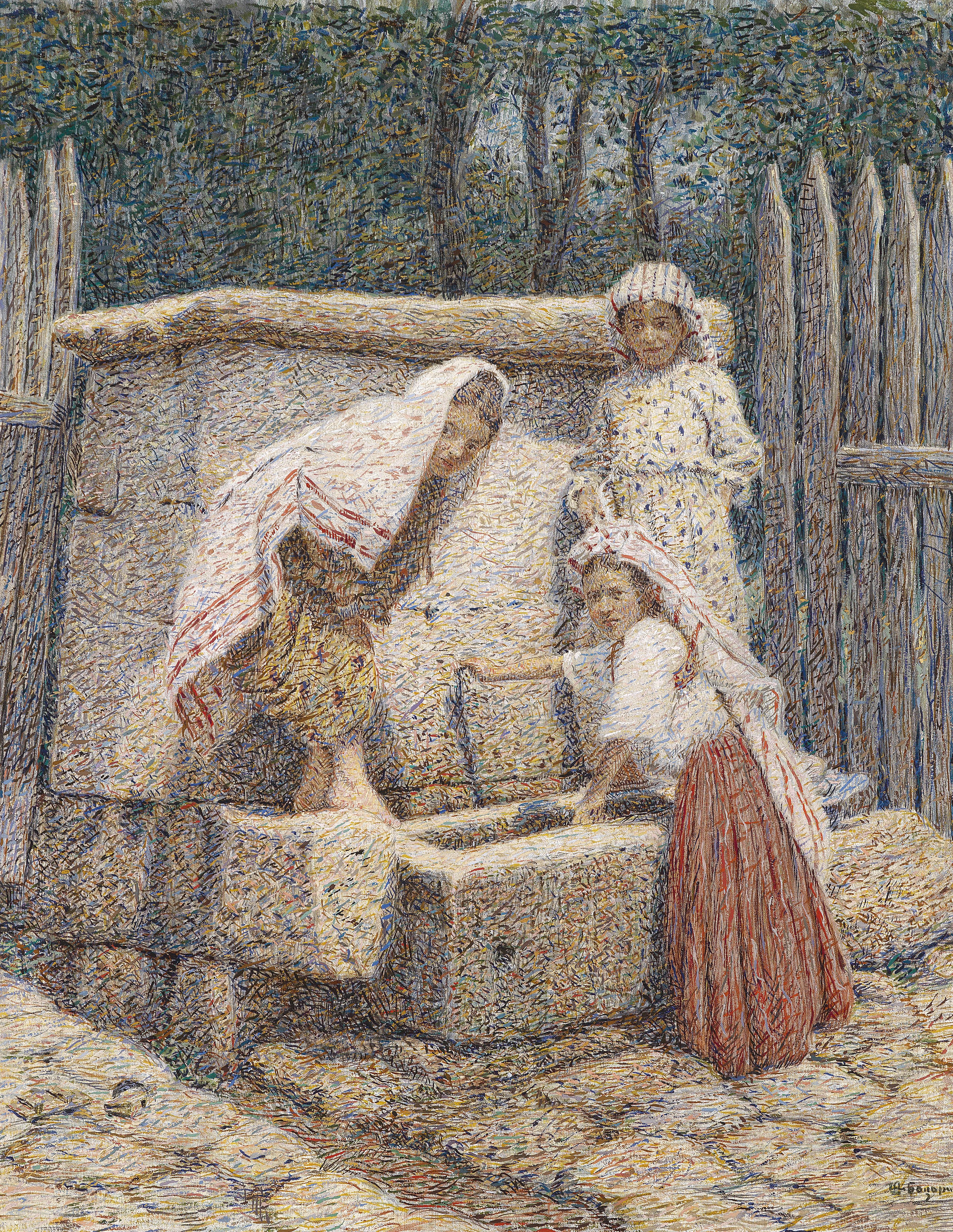
At the Well, 1941

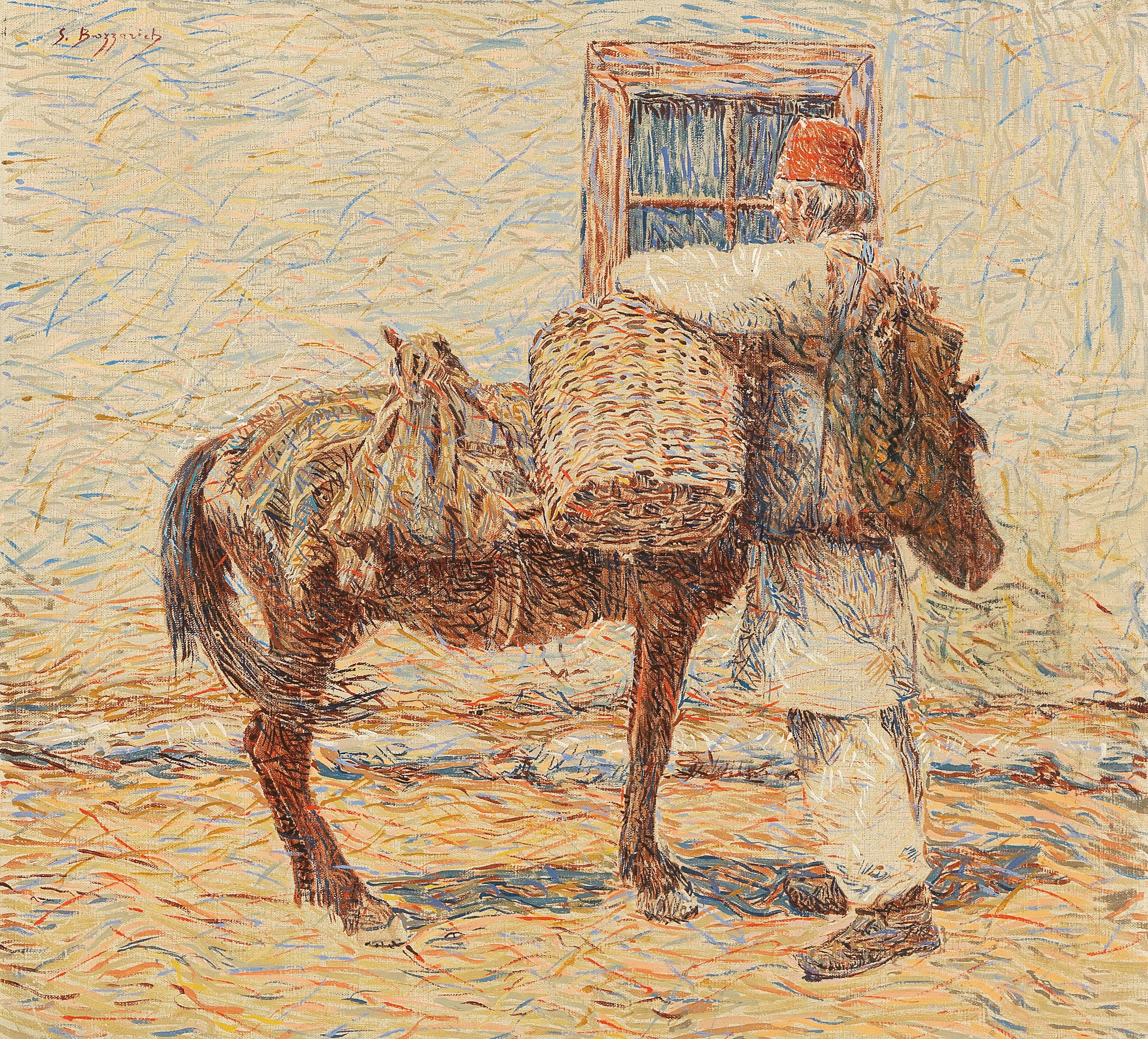
A Man with a Donkey, 1941

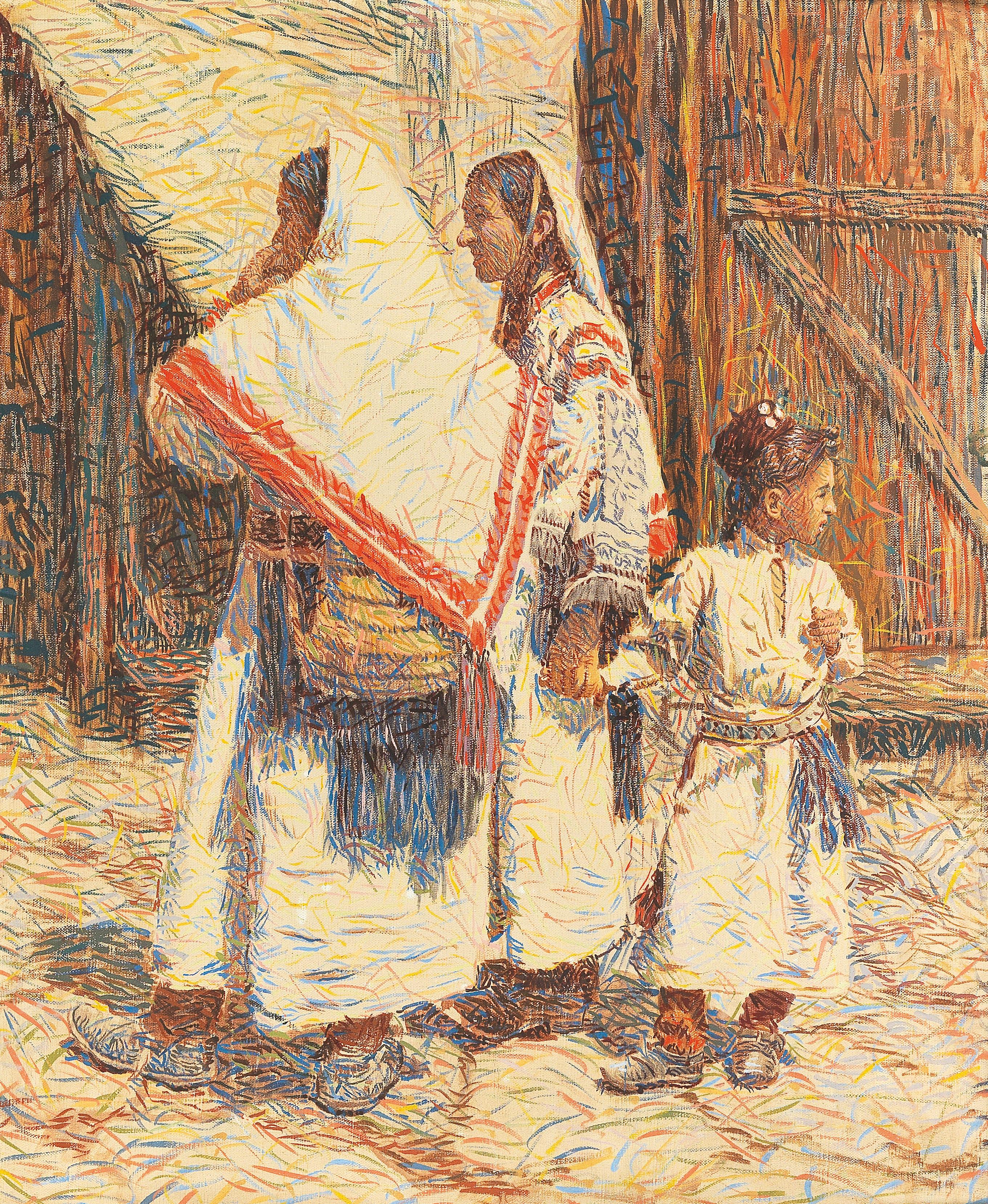
Serbian Peasant Women, 1941

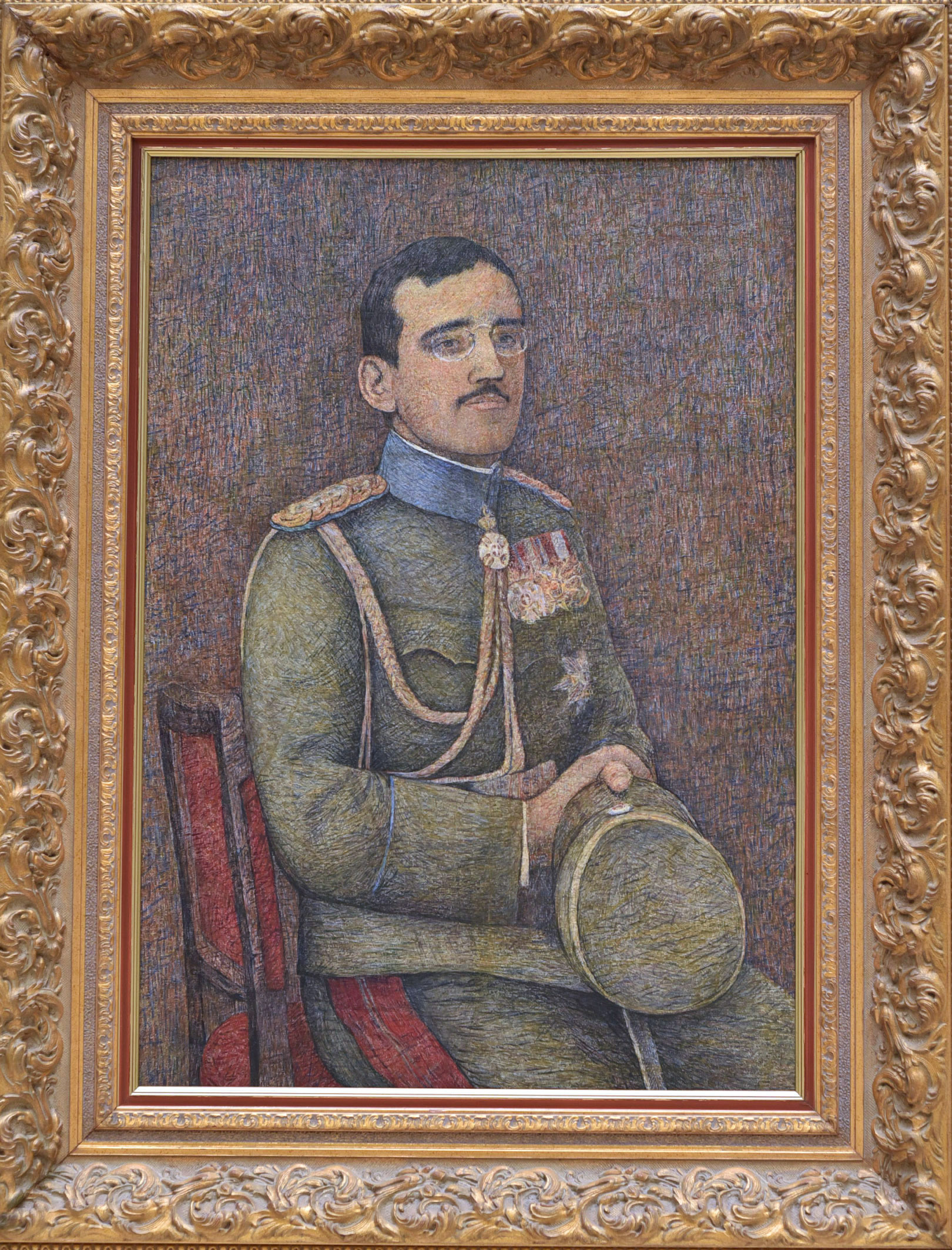
Alexander I of Yugoslavia

== See also ==
- List of painters from Serbia
- Serbian art
