= Ivica Hiršl =

- Born: 1905; Koprivnica, Austria-Hungary (now Croatia)
- Died: 1941 (aged 35–36); Jadovno concentration camp, Independent State of Croatia
- Cause of death: Murdered in Holocaust
- Education: University of Paris
- Occupation: Politician
- Known for: Mayor of Koprivnica

Ivica "Ivina" Hiršl (1905 – 1941) was a Croatian communist and Mayor of Koprivnica who was killed during the Holocaust.

Hiršl was born in Koprivnica to a Jewish family. His father was a merchant who owned an inn in Koprivnica. Hiršl completed high-school education in his native town in 1923. Hiršl attended and graduated from the University of Paris in 1929.

Fluent in French, Hiršl was a member of the Yugoslav Communist Party, and during his two-year stay in Paris, he was also a member of the French Communist Party. His communist activities were pursued in the framework of the Alliance française, where intellectuals gathered to learn French, so that they could develop political, cultural and artistic activities in Koprivnica. Returning to Koprivnica, he worked as a theatre actor at the Alliance française.

In 1935 he was employed as teacher at the Koprivnica gymnasium. Hiršl distinguished himself as a Kajkavian dialect poet and wrote a linguistic study about the impact of the French language on the Podravina Kajkavian dialect. He was dismissed as a teacher in the Koprivnica gymnasium because of his communist activities. In 1939, supported by Mihovil Pavlek Miškina, Hiršl was elected Mayor of Koprivnica. As mayor, he continued his anti-Hitler and communist activities.

In Koprivnica's local press he wrote columns Priča se i piše (There is a talk and it is written) and Politički kutić (Political nook). He also wrote columns Ivina z vugla (Ivina angle) and Ivina z drugoga vugla (Ivina second angle), in which he ridiculed the government of the time. During World War II, Hiršl was transferred to Vinkovci as punishment, and in 1941 he was among the first arrested in Koprivnica by the Ustaše. He was deported to Jadovno concentration camp where he was killed.

Hiršl was known by his nickname, "Ivina". He was a member of the Croatian Mountaineering Association and was particularly knowledgeable on Bilogora. In his honor Koprivnica Gymnasium teacher Vladimir Blašković proposed on 29 November 1975 that Koprivnica mountaineers rename the highest Bilogora peak as Ivina peak.

== Bibliography ==
- Kraus, Ognjen (1998). Dva stoljeća povijesti i kulture Židova u Zagrebu i Hrvatskoj. Zagreb: Židovska općina Zagreb. ISBN 953-96836-2-9.
