= Jadovno concentration camp =

WWII concentration camp in Croatia

Jadovno
- Concentration and extermination camp
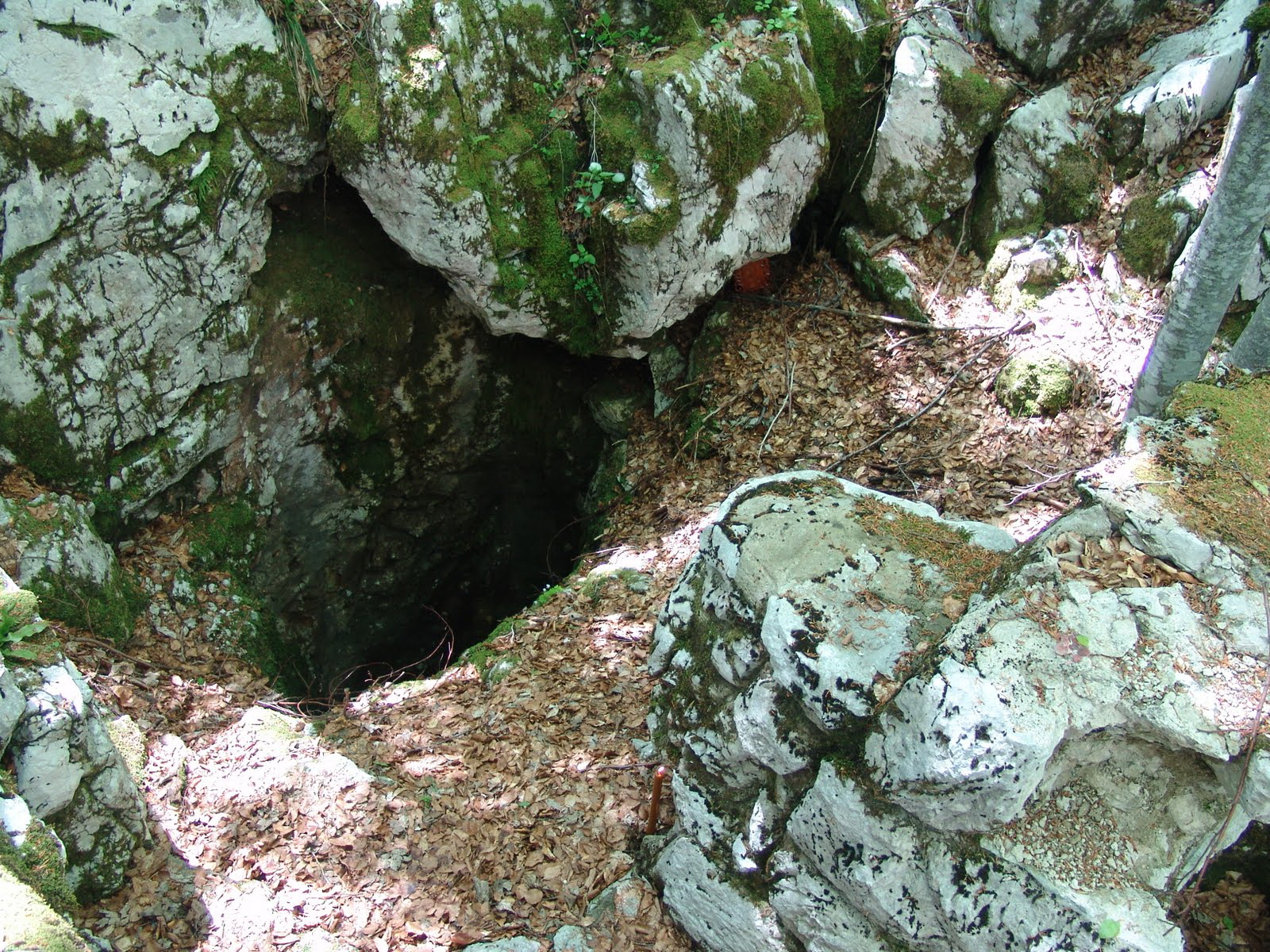
- The Šaran pit, located one kilometer from the camp.

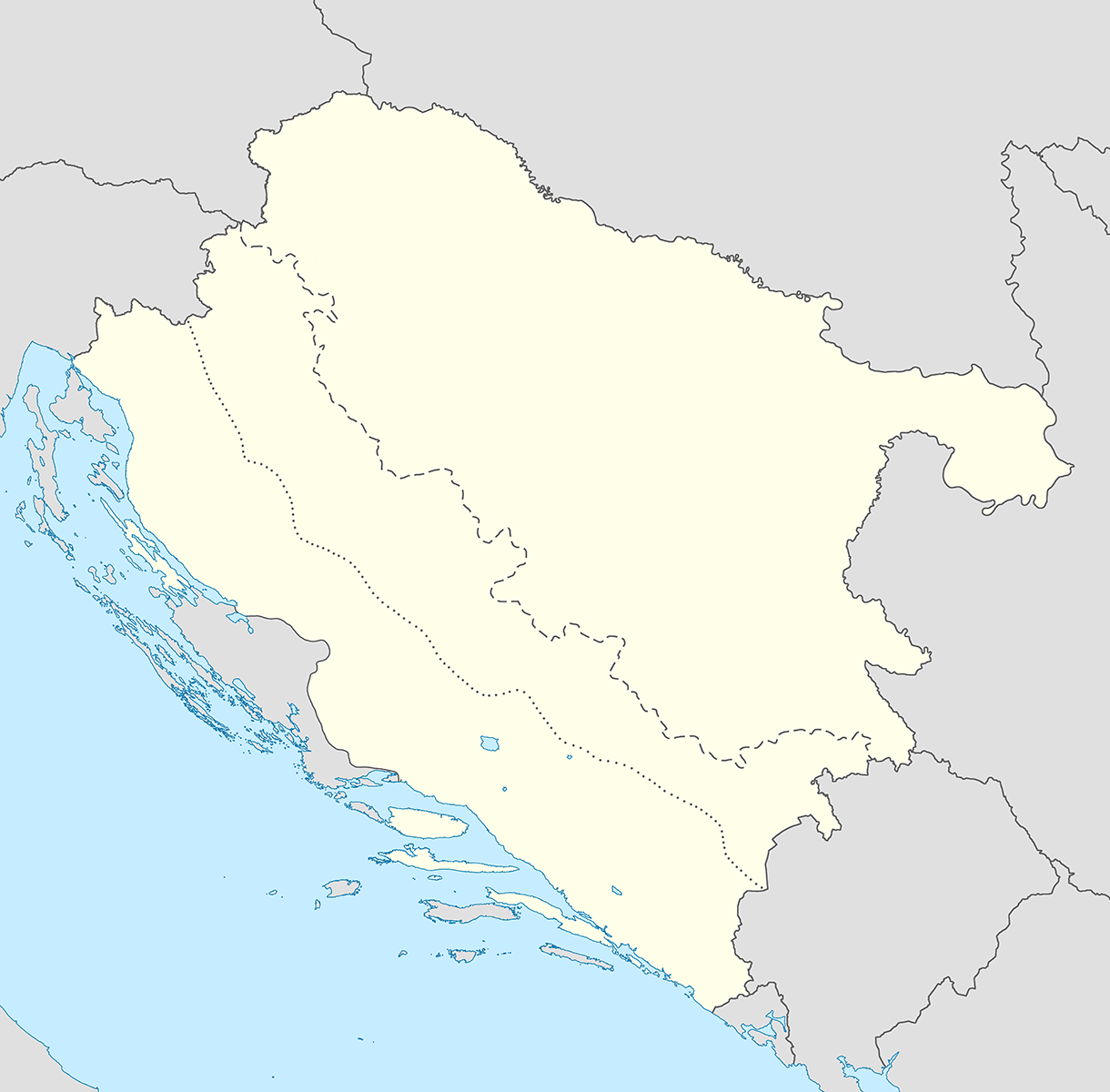
- Location of Jadovno within the Independent State of Croatia
- Coordinates: 44.5382°N 15.2388°E
- Location: Near Gospić, Independent State of Croatia
- Operated by: Ustaše and 13th Waffen SS Mountain Division
- Operational: April 1941 – August 1941
- Inmates: Primarily Serbs and Jews
- Killed: 10,000–68,000
- Notable inmates: Saint Damian of Bosnia; Ivica Hiršl; Aleksandar Savić; Špiro Bocarić; Bogdan Tošović

The Jadovno concentration camp was a concentration and extermination camp in the Independent State of Croatia (NDH) during World War II. Commanded by a member of the Ustaše Militia Juraj Rukavina, it was the first of twenty-six concentration camps in the NDH during the war. Established in a secluded area about 20 kilometres (12 mi) from the town of Gospić, it held thousands of Serbs and Jews over a period of 122 days from May to August 1941. Inmates were usually killed by being pushed into deep ravines located near the camp. Estimates of the number of deaths at Jadovno range from 10,000 to 68,000, mostly Serbs. The camp was closed on 21 August 1941, and the area where it was located was later handed over to the Kingdom of Italy and became part of Italian Zones II and III. Jadovno was replaced by the larger Jasenovac concentration camp and its extermination facilities.

The camp site remained unexplored after the war due to the depth of the gorges where bodies were disposed and the fact that some of them had been filled with concrete by Yugoslavia's Communist authorities. Additional sites containing the skeletal remains of camp victims were uncovered in the 1980s. Commemoration ceremonies honouring the victims of the camp have been organized by the Serb National Council (SNV), the Jewish community in Croatia, and local anti-fascists since 2009, and 24 June has since been designated as a "Day of Remembrance of the Jadovno Camp" in Croatia. A monument commemorating those killed in the camp was constructed in 1975 and stood for fifteen years before being removed in 1990. A replica of the original monument was constructed and dedicated in 2010, but disappeared within twenty-four hours of its inauguration.

== History ==
=== Background ===
On 6 April 1941, Axis forces invaded the Kingdom of Yugoslavia. Poorly equipped and trained, the Royal Yugoslav Army was quickly defeated. After the invasion, the extreme Croat nationalist and fascist Ante Pavelić, who had been in exile in Benito Mussolini's Italy, was appointed Poglavnik ("leader") of an Ustaše-led Croatian state – the Independent State of Croatia (often called the NDH, from the Croatian: Nezavisna Država Hrvatska). The NDH combined most of modern Croatia, all of modern Bosnia and Herzegovina and parts of modern Serbia into an "Italian-German quasi-protectorate". NDH authorities, led by the Ustaše militia, then implemented genocidal policies against the Serb, Jewish and Romani populations living in the new state.

Aiming to exterminate the entire Serb population of the NDH, the Ustaše sought to murder one-third of Serbs, convert one-third to Roman Catholicism, and force the rest from the country. A series of massacres were committed by the Ustaše, and the degree of cruelty with which the Serb population was persecuted shocked even the Germans.

The Cyrillic script was banned, Orthodox Christian church schools were closed, and Serbs were ordered to wear identifying armbands. Similar measures were enacted against Jews, who were required to wear a yellow armband with a black-on-yellow Star of David for identification. These armbands bore the word "Jew" in two languages: German ("Jude") and Croatian ("Židov").

=== Operation ===
Located in a secluded area about 20 kilometres (12 mi) from the town of Gospić, the Jadovno camp was formed during the early stages of the persecution of Serbs in the NDH and was placed under the command of the Ustaša Juco Rukavina. Intended as an extermination camp, it was established between 11 and 15 April 1941 and was the first of twenty-six concentration camps located in the NDH during the war.

Most inmates at Ustaše camps – including Jadovno – were Croatian Serbs. Other victims included Jews and anti-Ustaše Croats. Notable Jadovno inmates included the Croatian Jewish mayor of Koprivnica, Ivica Hiršl, and the Croatian Jewish Communist Aleksandar Savić.

Immediately, the Ustaše trucked several hundred detainees to a site intended almost exclusively for extermination near Gospić. Located on Mount Velebit, the town contained gorges – some up to 91.5 metres (300 ft) deep – that were used as dumping grounds. The Jadovno camp itself was surrounded by such abysses (Serbo-Croatian: jame) which were difficult to gain access to and characteristic of the karstic mountain range. The camp itself acted as a "way station" en route to these pits. Here, prisoners had to work the entire day with almost no food until exhaustion.

The nearest pit to the camp was the Šaran pit, located 1 kilometre (0.62 mi) away, while the pit where inmates were executed and dumped was 5 kilometres (3.1 mi) from the camp. Here, inmates were bound together in a line and the first few victims were murdered with rifle butts or other objects. Afterwards, an entire row of inmates were pushed into the ravine. In some cases, inmates were also killed by gunfire, as well as with knives and blunt objects. Once inmates were thrown into the ravine, hand grenades were hurtled inside in order to kill off the victims. Dogs would also be thrown in to feed on the wounded and the dead. The pits in the vicinity of the camp were filled with the bodies of Jewish and later Serb inmates. However, killings were not confined to these two groups, and the bodies of some Croats and Roma were disposed of in this fashion as well.

By the end of June, the Ustaše transferred several hundred Jewish families from Zagreb to Jadovno. Afterwards, the camp was visited by Ustaše commander Vjekoslav Luburić, who opened his visit by cutting the throat of a two-year-old Jewish child. Luburić then forced a camp guard to murder and squash the skull of a second child with his foot. The last group of inmates at Jadovno were killed with machine guns.

The camp was closed on 21 August 1941, and the remaining Croat inmates were transferred to other NDH-controlled camps, while the remaining Serbs and Jews were murdered. Work on the replacement Jasenovac concentration camp started in the same month. The area in which the Jadovno camp was located was later handed over to the Italians and became part of Italian Zones II and III.

=== Italian medical team report ===
In September 1941, two Italian army medical teams were sent to investigate reports of mass graves contaminating drinking water across the Velebit mountains and on the island of Pag, all part of the Jadovno system of Ustaše camps and killing pits. This description of the Plana pit, located above the village of Buđak, on Velebit, is from the report filed by Dr. Finderle Viktor:

In the area around the pit I found pieces of chains, padlocks of various sizes and shapes, railway employee badges, ribbons from trousers of Yugoslav customs officers, toothbrushes, pocket mirrors, combs, and very interestingly, emptied and torn wallets. On one spot I found pieces of a skull for which I believe to belong to an adult person between age 30 and 50, killed approximately two months before. The opening of the pit is 8x5m in size, and it seems to have no bottom. A rock I threw in did not stop, but fell so deeply that I could not hear it hit the bottom. The rim of the pit and its sides were covered with lime that seemed to be used several days before. Despite that the whole area is full of the terrible smell of decomposing corpses. It seems that around 500 victims were thrown into this pit.

The Italian team discovered additional Velebit killing pits - Jamina pit, near Tribnje ("hundreds of victims", including women and children), Jama na Pločama, near Stupačinovo (2.000 Serb victims), Duliba jama (200 victims), etc. Dr. Vittori notes that due to very difficult terrain and the locals not assisting out of fear of Ustaše retaliation, they were unable to locate other suspected killing pits. Beyond that, the Italian medical teams investigated the Slana and Metajna concentration camps on Pag island, part of the same system of Ustaše camps, where they dug up 791 corpses in mass graves, with nearly half being women and children, and estimated that eight to nine thousand were killed by the Ustaše in the camps on Pag.

== Death toll ==
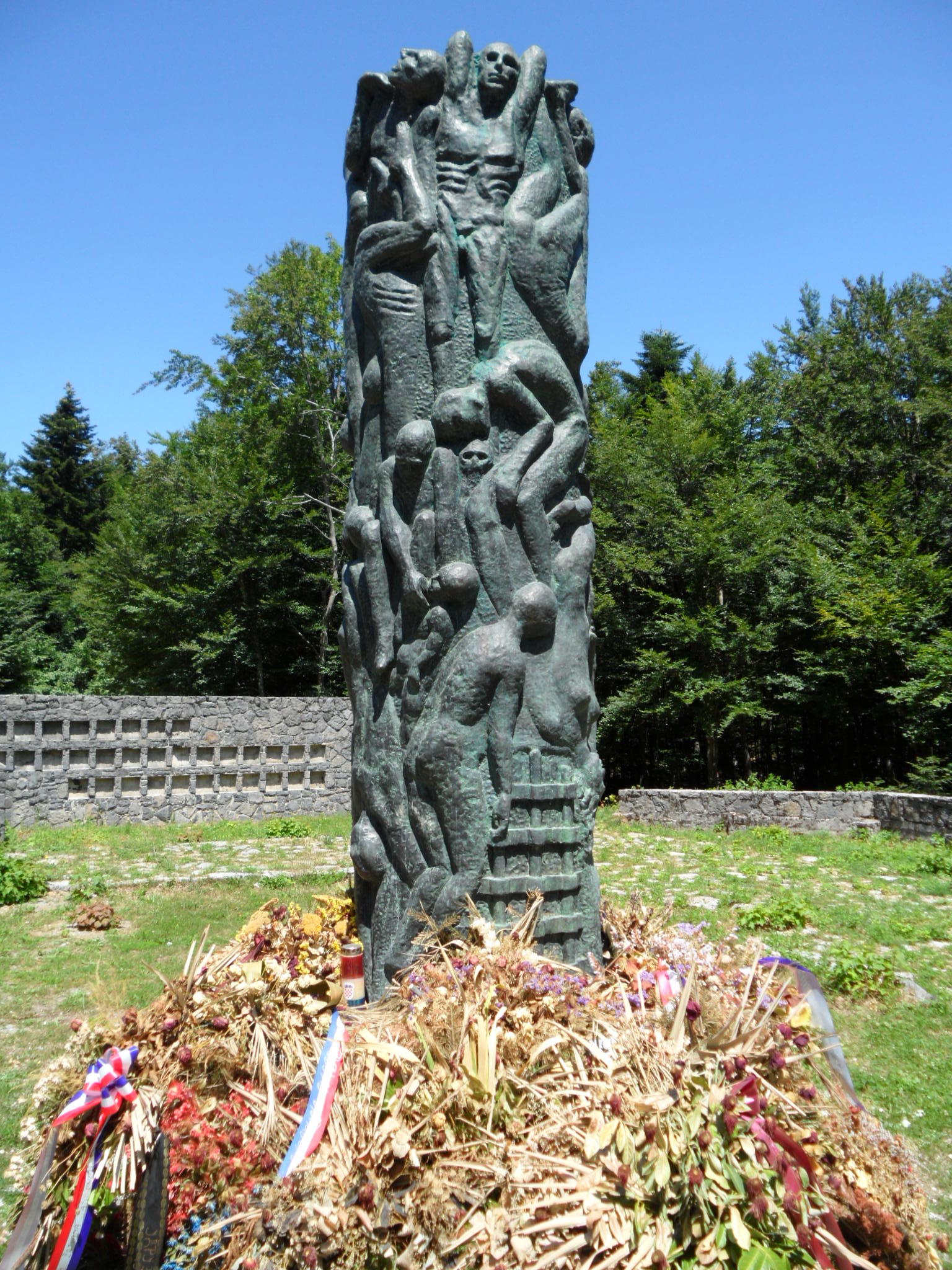
Monument to the victims of the camp.

The number of deaths at the camp is difficult to establish as many inmates often went unregistered as they were taken directly to the edge of ravines and murdered. The highest recorded estimate of Jadovno deaths was made in 1942 by a former inmate of the Gospić prison, who claimed that 120,000 people were killed. In 1964, a survey of World War II victims by the War Victim Census Commission showed a figure of 1,794 individual victims in Jadovno. The results of this survey were not published until 1989.

The 1960 edition of the Encyclopedia of Yugoslavia states at least 35,000 were killed in Jadovno, with a possible final death toll of 50,000–60,000. The 1967 Military Encyclopedia of Yugoslavia estimates that 72,000 inmates perished in the camp. The 1971 edition of the Encyclopedia of Yugoslavia also revised the number to 72,000, which became the most commonly cited estimate in the 1960s and the 1970s. Rev Atanasije Jevtić stated in 1983 that 80,000 inmates were killed. Historian Jozo Tomasevich said this claim was "exaggerated" and not based on any documentation or detailed investigation. Historian estimates in the late 1980s and the 1990s mostly ranged from 15,000 to 48,000 victims.

A 2007 research study by historian Đuro Zatezalo, using 17 archives, estimated that the total number of deaths at the camp was 40,123 (38,010 Serbs, 1,998 Jews, 88 Croats and 27 others) and listed the names of 10,502 identified victims, of whom 9,663 were Serbs, 762 Jews, 55 Croats and 22 others. 1,029 children were identified (1,014 Serb and 15 Jewish), as was 55 Serbian Orthodox priests according to Zatezalo's data. As it operated over a period of 122 days, this would suggest that an average of 329 people were killed there every day. Paul Mojzes cites Zatezalos's data.

According to a 2009 research by the Belgrade Museum of Genocide Victims, between 15,300–15,900 people were killed in the Gospić, Jadovno and Pag camps. Sources generally offer a range of 10,000–68,000 deaths at the camp. Estimates of the number of Jewish deaths range from several hundred to 2,500–2,800.

== Aftermath and legacy ==
The Jadovno camp site remained unexplored after the war due to the depth of the gorges where bodies were disposed of and the fact that some of these had been filled with concrete by Yugoslavia's Communist authorities. Additional sites containing the skeletal remains of camp victims were uncovered in the 1980s.

Commemoration ceremonies honouring the victims of the camp have been organized by the Serb National Council (SNV), representatives of the Jewish community in Croatia, and local anti-fascists since 2009. 24 June has since been designated as a Day of Remembrance of the Jadovno Camp in Croatia. A monument commemorating those who perished was constructed in 1975 and stood for fifteen years before being removed in 1990 prior to the outbreak of ethnic violence during the Croatian War of Independence. A replica of the original monument was constructed and dedicated in 2010, but disappeared within twenty-four hours of its inauguration.

== See also ==
- World War II in Yugoslavia
- Concentration camps in the Independent State of Croatia
- Genocide of Serbs in the Independent State of Croatia
