= Slana concentration camp =

Old nazi concentration camp in Croatia

Slana
- Concentration and extermination camp
- Location within Croatia
- Coordinates: 44.498°N 15.051°E
- Location: Slana bay, Pag, Croatia
- Built by: Mijo Babić
- Operated by: Ustaše
- Commandant: Ivan Devčić Pivac
- Operational: late June 1941 - second half of August 1941
- Inmates: Serbs; Jews
- Killed: 4,000–12,000 (together with the women's camp Metajna)
- Liberated by: Disbanded due to Italian occupation of Italian occupation zone in NDH

Slana concentration camp was a concentration and extermination camp on the Croatian island Pag. It was part of system of Ustaše concentration camps and killing pits, stretching from Gospić, across the Velebit mountains, to the island of Pag.

The camp was established in June 1941 in Metajna. It was established by Mijo Babić and controlled by the Ustaše, who had been installed as rulers of the puppet state of Croatia by Adolf Hitler and Benito Mussolini. Slana was a men's camp. Most prisoners were Jews, Serbs and Croatian communists. The commander of the camp was Ivan Devčević, who was also a commander of the 13th Ustaša battalion which was garrisoned in the camp.

The camp was closed in August 1941 by the Italian military, who feared that the brutality of the Ustaše would provoke unrest in the region. Historians have estimated the death toll in Slana and the women's camp of Metajna to be between 4,000 and 12,000. Among the victims were 1,500 Jews. During the first weeks the inmates mainly died of physical abuse, exhaustion, heat, hunger and thirst. Once incoming transports became more frequent and the camp started running out of space, the Ustaše began executing prisoners by the hundreds.

== Testimonies ==
The Catholic canon of Pag, don Joso Felicinović, who initially helped establish Ustaše authority on Pag, later wrote that "Slana became an Auschwitz-Dachau in miniature, a camp in which innocent men, women and children were killed in all kinds of bestial ways". He writes that the wife of a Pag boat owner, on whose boat alone the Ustaše transported 3,000 prisoners to Pag, begged him to intercede for her son, telling him he'd go mad, because the Ustaše forced him to transport internees from Slana to a cove, where he witnessed the men and women being "killed and thrown into a pit which had already been prepared". Felicinović writes that on his first visit to the abandoned Slana camp, he found "a piece of cardboard on the wall of the main Ustaše barracks on which records were kept of the women and girls raped in the camp, with their names and the dates, and by which Ustaše", Don Felicinović estimated the Ustaše killed 12,000 people at Slana and Metajna, with some 4,000 of them being women and children.

In September 1941, an Italian army medical team was sent to investigate reports of mass graves contaminating drinking water across the Velebit mountains and on the island of Pag. They dug up mass graves at Slana and Metajna with 791 corpses, of which nearly half were women and children, the youngest a 5-month-old infant. Their report includes the following description of how they dug up these mass graves:

After the first 5 to 20 cm [of earth] removed we saw many hands, often bound (see photo 6), bare feet, sometimes with shoes, heads looking upwards or with necks exposed…Although we had already got used to limbs and heads sticking out, there was something particular about the way they had been buried…The proof that they had been buried mortally wounded but still alive were distorted and terrible facial expressions of the most corpses….In some places there were five layers of corpses, in some less…We found machine gun shells near the pit, and on many corpses we could see mortal wounds made with knives on chests, backs and necks (see photo 13). One young woman had her breasts completely cut off with a sharp weapon. We found only women and children in two pits while in the others men, women and children were buried together.

The Italian team leader wrote “from the person who served as our guide ...I found out that most inmates from Slana had been thrown into the sea tied to large rocks, and many of them took their own lives by drowning". The Italian army team estimated 8 to 9 thousand people were killed by the Ustaše at Slana and Metajna.

Author Ante Zemljar published a book about what happened in Slana in 1941 entitled Charon and Destinies. In 2015 an Israeli television crew came to film at the Slana and Metajna concentration camps, but were chased away by locals who called the police to report "unauthorized filming", and the police then escorted the Israeli crew off the Island, forbidding them to film at the sites. A memorial plaque, erected at Slana in 1975, commemorating "the innocent Serbs, Jews and Croats" killed there, has been destroyed multiple times after Croatia's independence in the 1990s.

== Gallery ==
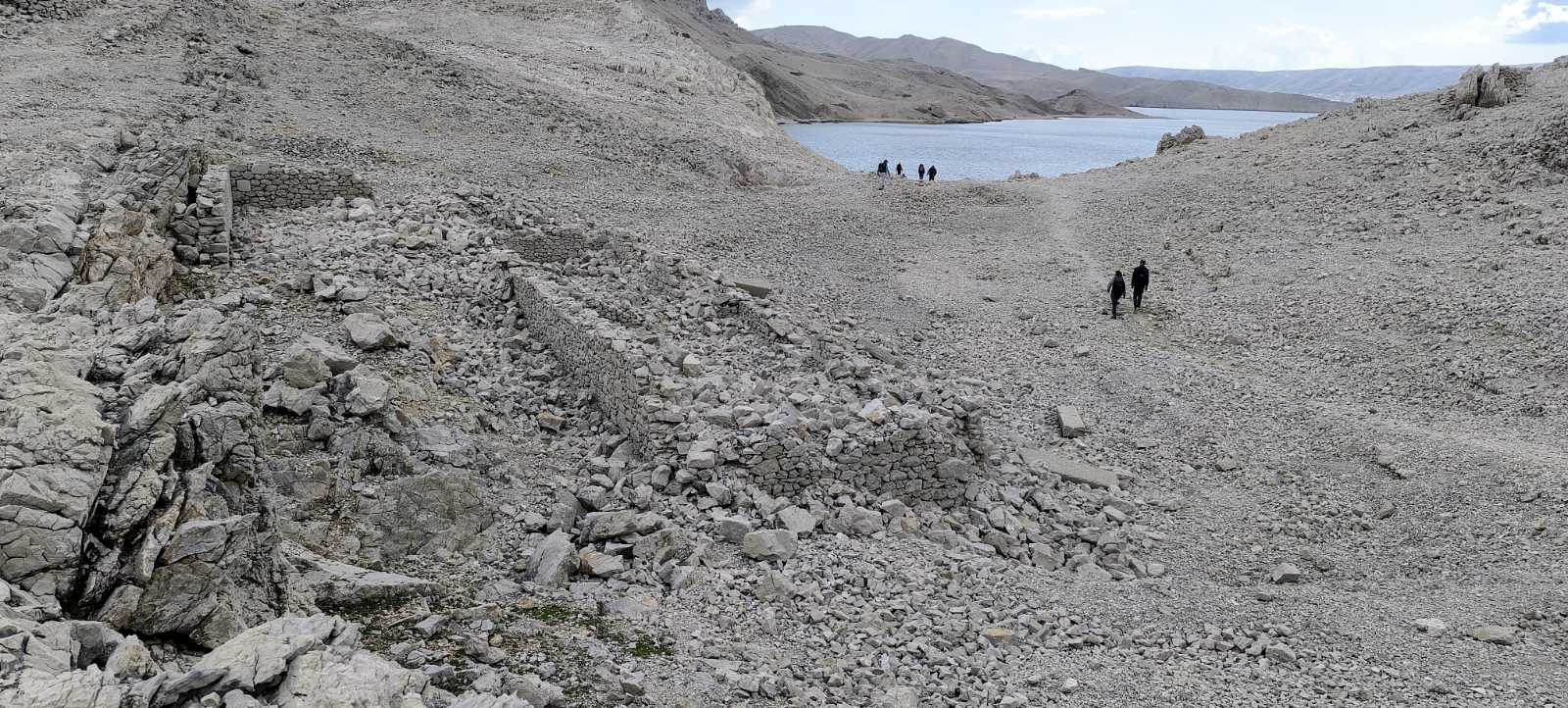
Object remains on a location of Slana concentration camp.

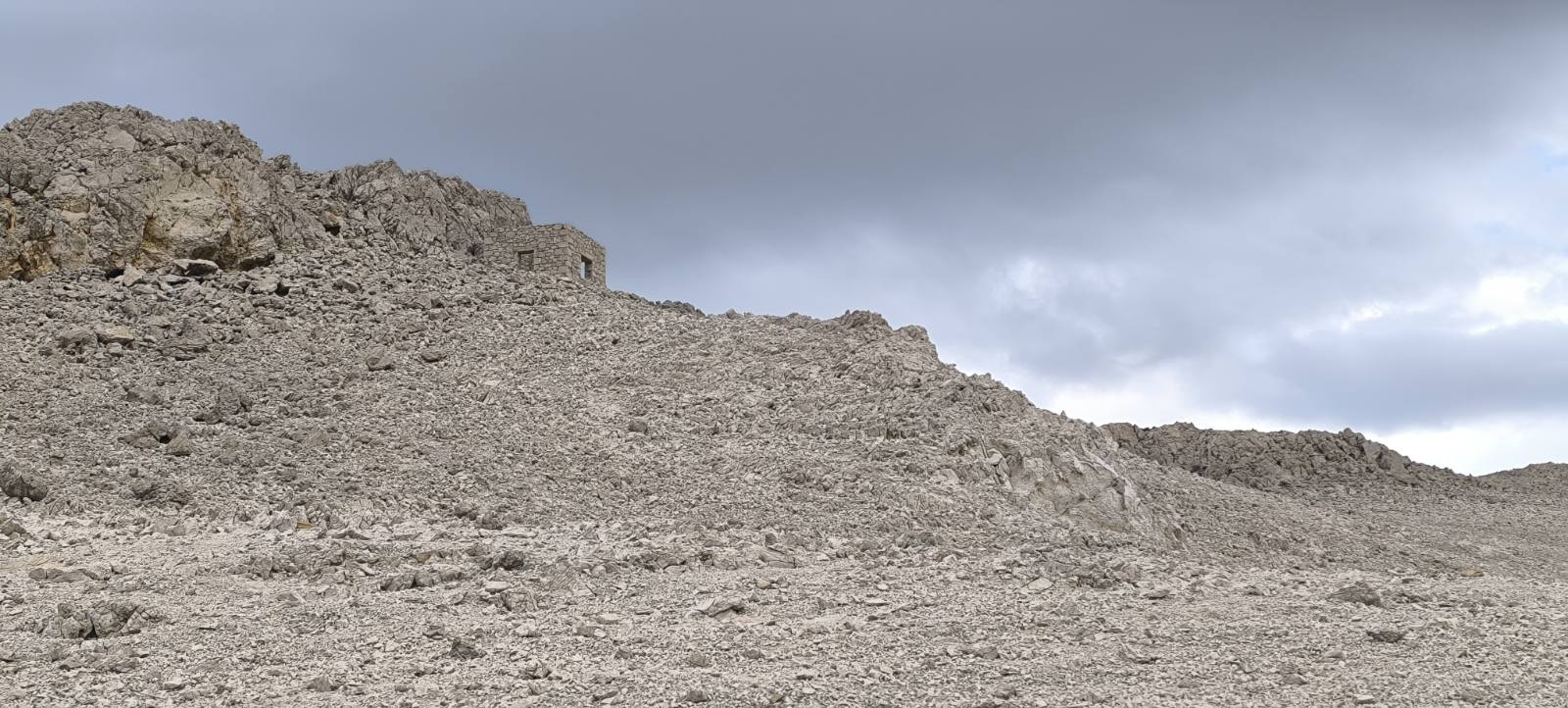
Remains of what seems to be an eleveted object overlooking the location of Slana Concentration Camp.

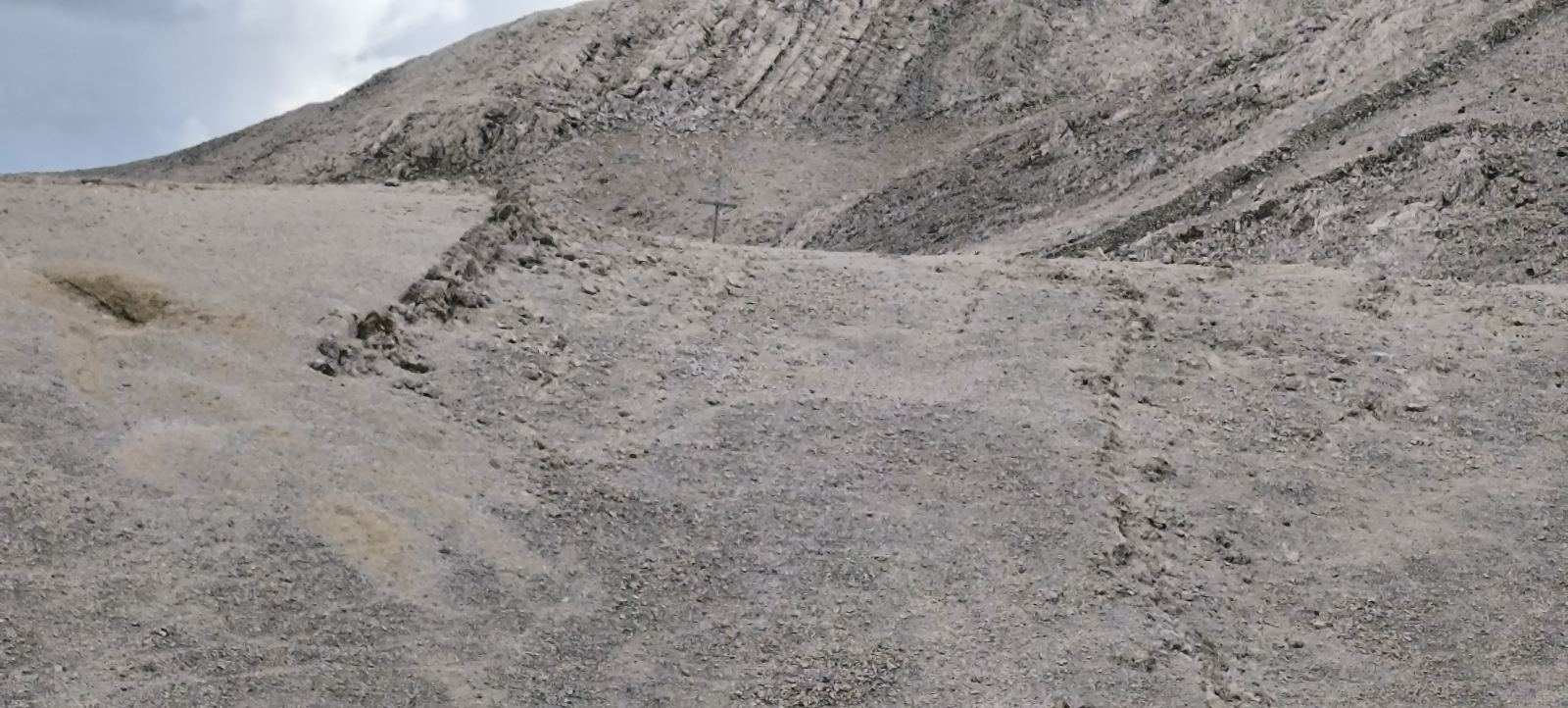
Memorial cross on a location of Slana concentration camp.

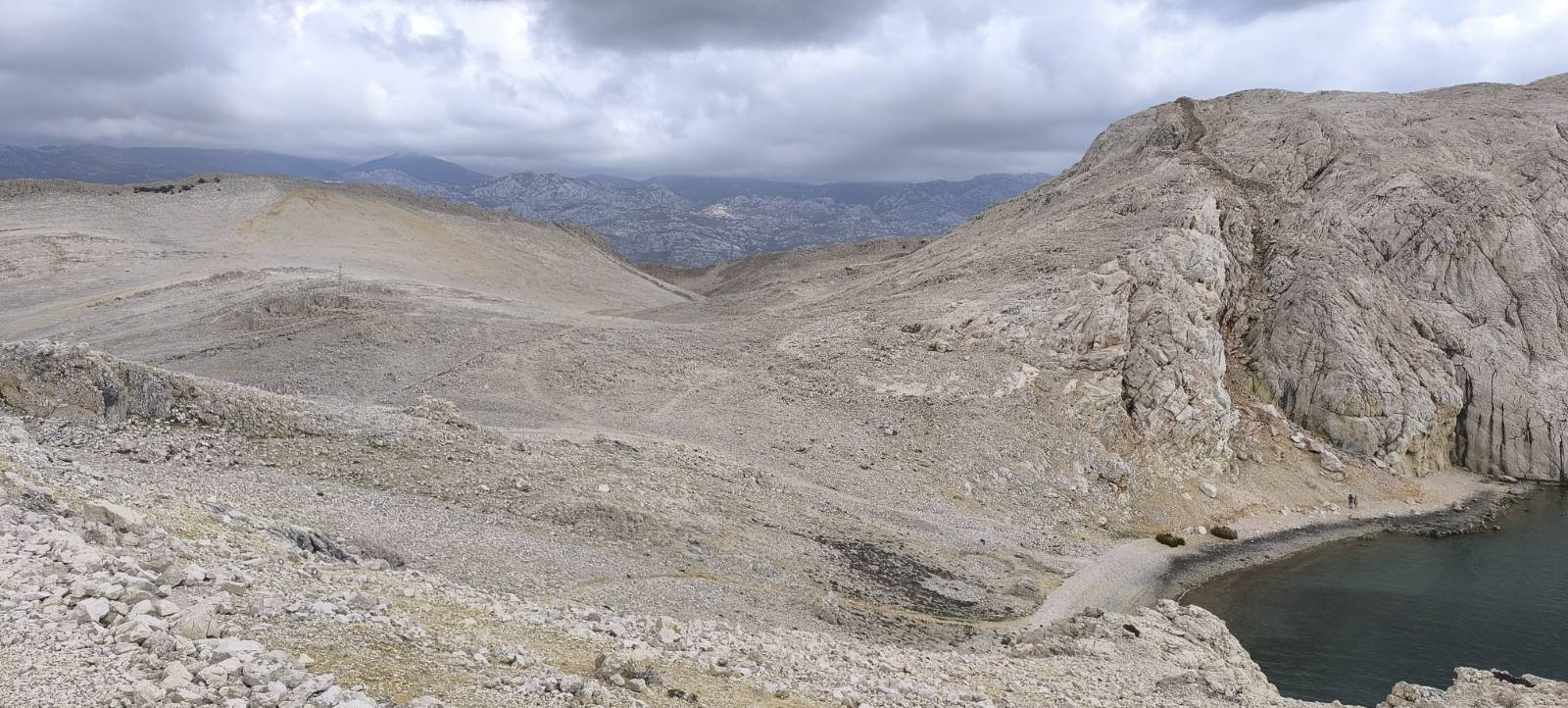
Slana bay as seen from the west.

== Sources ==
- Dedijer, Vladimir; Miletić, Antun (1990). Genocid nad Muslimanima, 1941–1945. Svjetlost. ISBN 9788601015258.
