= Jastrebarsko children's camp =

Concentration camp in the Independent State of Croatia

Jastrebarsko
- Children's camp
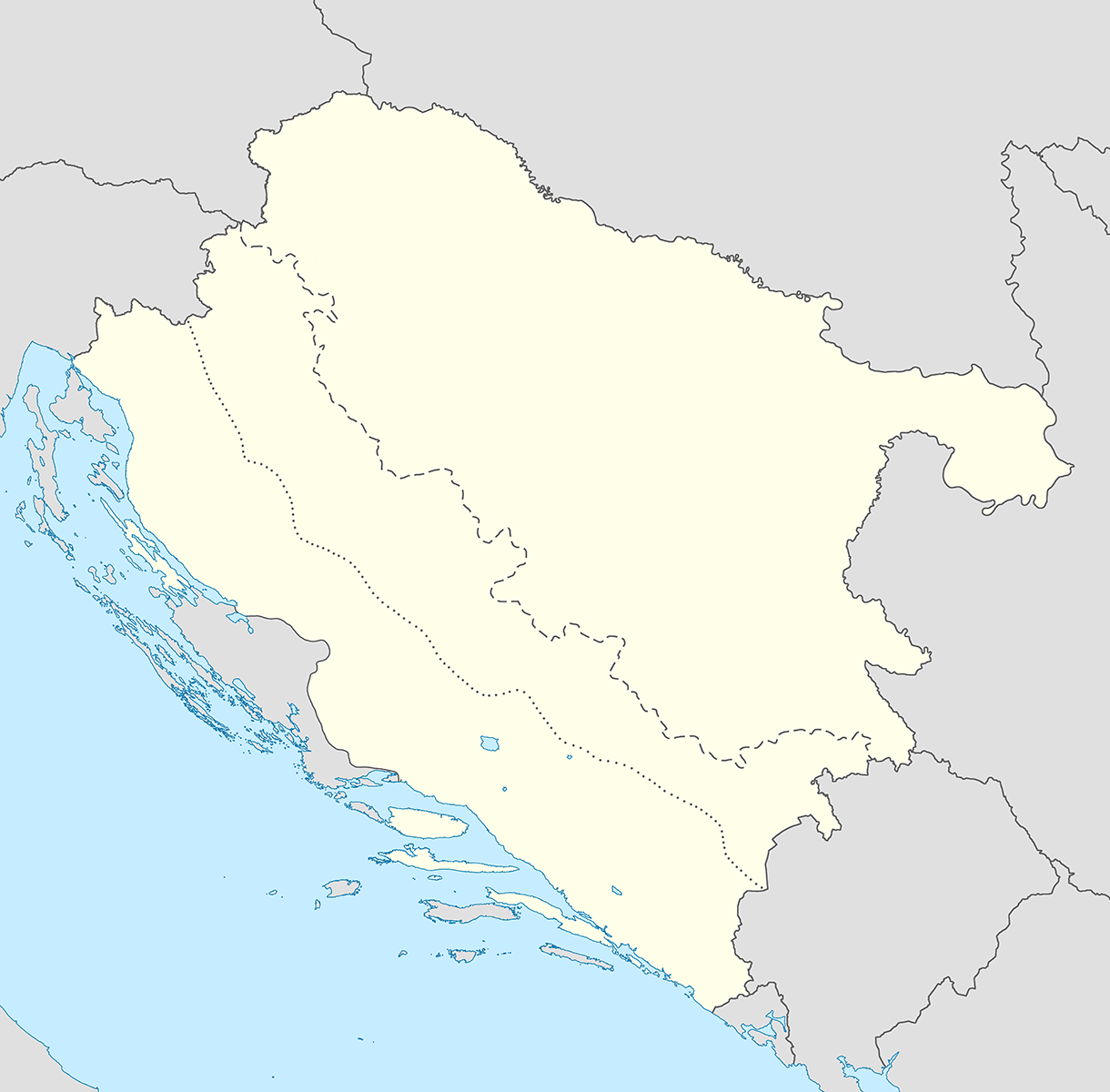
- Location of Jastrebarsko in the Independent State of Croatia
- Coordinates: 45°40′19″N 15°39′4″E
- Location: Jastrebarsko, Independent State of Croatia
- Operated by: Ustaše; Daughters of Charity of Saint Vincent de Paul
- Commandant: Sister Barta Pulherija
- Original use: Castle; Monastery; Barracks; Brickworks
- Operational: 12 July – October 1942
- Inmates: Serb children
- Killed: 449–1,500 (estimated)
- Liberated by: Yugoslav Partisans

The Jastrebarsko children's camp held Serb children who had been brought there from various areas of the Axis puppet state, the Independent State of Croatia (Croatian: Nezavisna Država Hrvatska, NDH), during World War II. The children had been captured as a result of massacres and counter-insurgency operations conducted by the genocidal Ustaše-led government, its Axis allies and other collaborators since the Axis invasion of Yugoslavia and establishment of the NDH in April 1941. The camp was located in the town of Jastrebarsko, about 37 kilometres (23 mi) southwest of the NDH capital, Zagreb, and operated from 12 July until October 1942. Camp administration was provided by nuns of the Daughters of Charity of Saint Vincent de Paul order, with Ustaše guards.

Children arrived in an emaciated and weak condition from other camps within the Ustaše camp system, with a total of 3,336 children passing through the camp. Between 449 and 1,500 children died, mainly from disease and malnutrition. A sub-camp was established in nearby Donja Reka. The Yugoslav Partisans liberated about 350 children from the main camp in August 1942. In October 1942, about 500 of the surviving children were dispersed among local families by the Catholic aid group, Caritas; in total, 1,637 boys and girls were taken in by families in Jastrebarsko, Zagreb and surrounding villages, and another 113 were relocated to Gradiška.

== Background ==
In April 1941, the German-led Axis invasion of Yugoslavia overran the country. While the invasion was still underway, the Germans orchestrated the proclamation of the Independent State of Croatia (Croatian: Nezavisna Država Hrvatska, NDH) by the fascist and Croat-chauvinist Ustaše party. The government of this Italo-German quasi-protectorate immediately implemented a "savage policy aimed at fashioning a largely homogeneous state out of a heterogeneous population". According to the historian and political scientist Sabrina P. Ramet, the NDH was run by the most brutal and bloody puppet regime in Axis-dominated Europe during World War II, which incited widespread massacres and operated concentration camps targeting Serbs, Jews, Romani people and other "undesirables". In particular, the Ustaše regime expelled large numbers of Serbs from the NDH, and was involved in widespread mass murder, resulting in Ramet's conclusion that it was genocidal in both intent and in practical terms.

The Catholic Church had a complex relationship with the NDH government, particularly due to the close relationship between Catholicism, Croatian nationalism, and historical Croatian polities. Some Catholic clergy, especially younger members, were intolerant towards Serbs and the Serbian Orthodox Church for a range of reasons, with some Catholic clergy participating in forced conversions of Orthodox Serbs to Catholicism in accordance with Ustaše policy.

Under the Treaties of Rome of 18 May 1941, Italian occupation troops had withdrawn south of the so-called "Vienna Line" which divided the NDH into Italian and German spheres of influence. They re-occupied this area in August in order to properly secure the Adriatic coast. However, in June 1942, they again withdrew most of their troops from this area, concentrating only on securing large population centres and railroads. Included in this withdrawal were Italian troops that had been garrisoned in the Jastrebarsko area.

== Origins ==
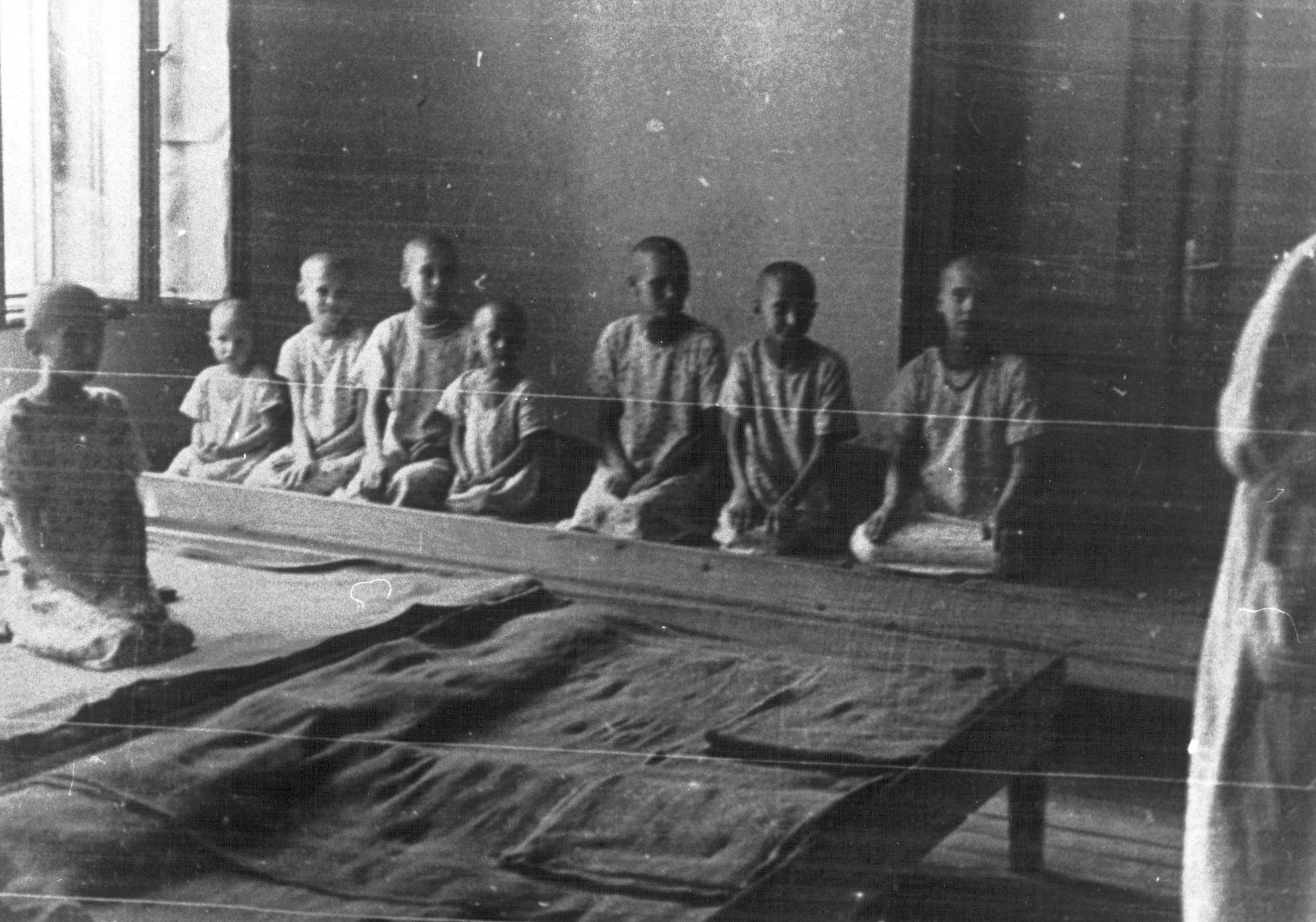
Children from Kozara in the Jastrebarsko concentration camp, after the offensive on Kozara, 1942.

The decision to establish the Jastrebarsko children's camp was taken due to the large numbers of Serb children who had been rounded up during anti-Serb massacres conducted by NDH forces since April 1941. Children had also been taken during anti-Partisan operations conducted by German, NDH and other collaborationist forces between April 1941 and June 1942, such as the Kozara Offensive. Their parents and older siblings had often been killed or sent to labour camps both within the NDH and elsewhere in Axis-occupied Europe. Those children who had not been killed in the massacres and counter-insurgency operations were rounded up, as their villages had in most cases been burned to the ground, and they had no means of support.

By mid-1942, over 1,000 children that had been rounded up during the Kozara Offensive were being held at the Stara Gradiška concentration camp, itself a sub-camp of the Jasenovac concentration camp complex. Information about the plight of these children was passed to concerned citizens in the NDH capital, Zagreb, one of whom was Diana Budisavljević, an Austrian. Budisavljević approached an Ustaše-appointed member of the board of the Croatian Red Cross, Kamilo Brössler, and told him about the children at Stara Gradiška. Brössler was horrified, and with the support of representatives of the International Committee of the Red Cross, began to place pressure on the NDH government to release the children. Budisavljević also used her contacts with the German Army to intervene with the Ustaše regime on behalf of the children.

The NDH government struck upon the idea of trying to re-educate the children to become something akin to an Ustaše version of the Hitler Youth, thereby turning them against their Serb parents. The regime saw this as a more effective way of placing pressure on the Partisan movement than killing the children outright. However, the NDH regime had not made any arrangements to implement this idea, so the children's camp was established in haste, especially as there was strong pressure to do something for the children. NDH regime propaganda advanced the idea that the children were being liberated from slavery at the hands of the Partisans.

== Establishment ==
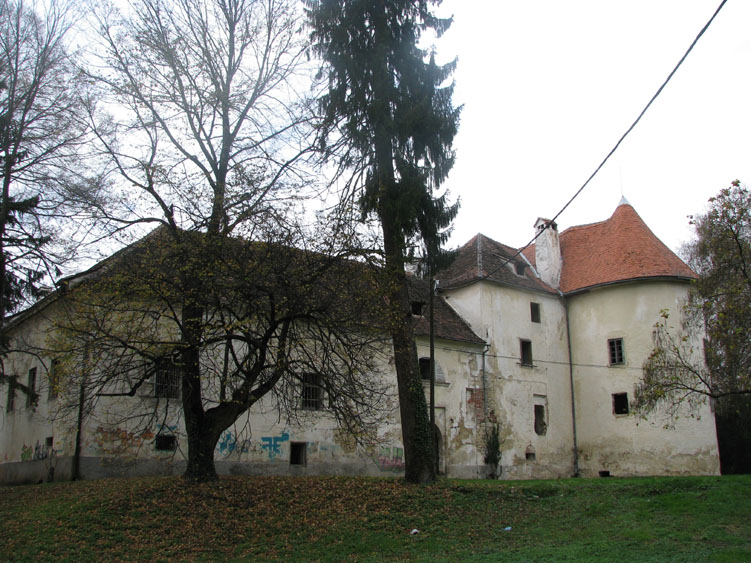
The former Erdödy Castle had been a children's home before World War II. It formed part of the camp complex.

The camp was established in the town of Jastrebarsko, about 37 kilometres (23 mi) southwest of the NDH capital, Zagreb. This location was chosen due to its close proximity to Zagreb, which reduced exposure to Partisan influence and made defence easier. The buildings earmarked to accommodate the children were: the Erdödy Castle, the nearby Franciscan monastery, and the former Italian barracks and stables. It was located in an area that had previously been garrisoned by Italian troops under an agreement with the NDH government.

The castle had previously housed a children's home and, in the spring and summer of 1941, a transit camp for Jews and political opponents of the regime, in which they were held, tortured, and then moved to other concentration camps. Preparations for the reception of the children were completed hastily by the Croatian Red Cross and local peasants. At the head of the camp administration was a nun, Sister Barta Pulherija, a member of the Daughters of Charity of Saint Vincent de Paul order, and Sister Gaudencija was the manager of the camp estate. Pulherija was the sister-in-law of Mile Budak, a senior Ustaše ideologist and high-ranking NDH official. The staff otherwise consisted of members of the Ustaše Youth and female Ustaše.

A sub-camp was established on 31 July at Donja Reka, 3 kilometres (1.9 mi) north of Jastrebarsko, under the same administration as the main camp. It was situated in an old brick factory, and barracks and stables previously used by the Italian Army. Conditions at this sub-camp were even worse than at the main camp, with no electricity, running water or sanitary facilities. Food was extremely poor, and disease and death were common among the up to 2,000 children kept there.

== Operation ==
=== Initial transport ===
In early July 1942, 16 Red Cross nurses were sent from Zagreb to the Stara Gradiška concentration camp to collect 650 children and bring them to Jastrebarsko. The journey of 135 kilometres (84 mi) from Stara Gradiška to Zagreb took 24 hours, during which 17 children died. During decontamination procedures in Zagreb another 30 children died. Another 37 very ill children were placed in a Zagreb hospital, but they also died soon after. The remaining 566 children made it to Jastrebarsko alive, and the camp opened on 12 July 1942.

=== Further transports ===
A second group of 770 children from Stara Gradiška followed on 13–14 July, while a third, consisting of another 850 children, were transported from the concentration camps at Mlaka and Jablanac near Jasenovac at the end of the month. On 5 August, 800 more children arrived from Mlaka. The final group arrived at the Donja Reka site from the village of Gornja Rijeka on 14 August with 150 children, all boys. In total, 3,136 children arrived at the camp up to 14 August. According to the historian Dragoje Lukić, a total of 3,336 children passed through the camp during its existence, aged between one and fourteen years old.

One survivor, Dušanka Šmitran, who had previously been held at one of the sub-camps of the Jasenovac concentration camp complex, stated that she was dragged away from her mother at the sub-camp and she and the other children were packed tightly into railway wagons for the journey. On arrival in Zagreb, she said they were taken to the Croatian Red Cross building where they were washed, had their hair cut, and were allowed to eat as much as they could. She remarked that this was the only time such things occurred during her time in the Ustaše camps.

=== Arrival ===
The children were clothed in black with caps bearing the Ustaše symbol

Upon arrival, the children were exhausted and virtually naked. Their appearance was skeletal, especially those transported from Stara Gradiška. Many had swollen bellies due to malnourishment, thin pale faces, and teeth falling out. Almost all were suffering from severe diarrhea, and most had multiple diseases. Some children died after the effort of simply getting up.

No preparations had been made for the arrival of the initial transport, accommodation had not been set aside and no food had been prepared. The children were placed in different parts of the camp based on their condition. The healthier and stronger children were housed in the barracks, weaker and sick children were accommodated in the castle, and the very weak and those suffering from typhus were lodged in the monastery. Upon arrival, the children were clothed in the black uniform of the Ustaše with caps bearing the Ustaše symbol.

The former castle comprised the camp "hospital" and accommodated about 300 children. Another 250 girls were housed in the nearby former Italian barracks. The monastery area of the camp consisted of three former Italian Army stables, which contained about 700 boys between the ages of 10 and 15 years. Only Serb children were kept in the camp, and they came from all over the NDH. They had previously been kept at the camps at Stara Gradiška, Jasenovac, Jablanac, Cerovljani, Mlaka, Gornja Rijeka and areas of Slavonia. Those accommodated in the barracks had no electricity or running water, and food initially consisted of little more than cornflour.

=== Camp routine and punishments ===
According to a survivor, Nada Požega from Slavonia, the children were forced to go to church to pray, and were required to greet others with the Ustaše greeting Spremni (Ready) or the Nazi salute Heil Hitler. Those children who failed to do so were punished by the Ustaše guards with beatings or solitary confinement. Požega further stated the nuns did not treat the children with sympathy or care. Another survivor, Mihajlo Veljić, recalled that the barracks were fenced with barbed wire, and that they slept on the straw-covered floor. He stated that the Ustaše tried to convert the children to Catholicism. He personally feared a nun, Sister Mercedes, but all the children feared Pulherija.

Another survivor, Radomir Krnjajić, recalled that they were fed a variety of foods, including pumpkin soup, cucumbers, beets and similar vegetables, and sometimes received a little macaroni or beans, but very little bread. Gojko Knežević, another camp survivor, recounted many years later that the nuns beat the children with birch branches dipped in salt water or vinegar. The author and former military judge Ivan Fumić concludes that the children were systematically punished for various infractions, and were treated harshly by the Ustaše and the majority of the nuns. Some of the nuns at the camp, however, did demonstrate affection and pay attention to the children.

=== Humanitarian response ===
In response to the parlous conditions and poor state of the children's health, the Croatian Red Cross and some locals from Jastrebarsko and Donja Reka, led by Tatjana Marinić, a local teacher, Communist and social worker, collected food and distributed it among the children, decorated the walls, and treated their illnesses. It took some time for the helpers to earn the trust of the children due to the latter's harsh treatment at the hands of the Ustaše, but gradually their health began to improve. The helpers lived in the camp and at the sub-camp with the children. Pulherija railed against all this but was unable to stop it.

=== Disease and deaths ===
The parlous state of the children's health is apparent when at one point, 400 were suffering from dysentery, 300 had measles, 200 had typhoid, 200 had diphtheria and another 100 had mumps. Many children were also suffering from scurvy due to the poor diet. Based on incomplete records, monthly mortality figures have been given as: July – 153; August – 216; September – 67; and October – 8. To these can be added five children who died in hospital in Zagreb, for a total of 449. (Note: The figures given by Fumić add up to 449, but he gives the total as 448, and elsewhere as 468. Lukić gives the total number of victims as 449. Both sources state that these figures come from incomplete records covering the period from 12 July to the end of October 1942.)

Lukić states that this figure, and the figure of 468 victims which is engraved on the monument to the victims of the camp in Jastrebarsko, are unreliable. He cites documentary evidence provided by the local gravedigger Franjo Ilovar, whose notes indicate a much higher mortality among the children. Ilovar listed a total of 768 burials of children at the Jastrebarsko cemetery, but Lukić points out that Ilovar was not the only gravedigger burying children, and further reports that Ilovar himself believed that the figure on the monument was too low. A survivor interviewed in 2010 quoted Ilovar as saying that he buried 1,018 children from the camp. A news report in 2010 stated that 1,500 children died in the camp. According to the records of the Croatian Red Cross, of the 1,507 Kozaran children brought to Jastrebarsko, 163 died. When the children died, they were placed into empty sugar crates which were stacked along the fence of the camp awaiting disposal.

Lukić notes that the mortality rate among the children at Jastrebarsko was much lower than that of children at Stara Gradiška and Sisak for two reasons. Firstly, almost half the children at Jastrebarsko were older children more able to cope with the harsh conditions. More importantly, from the end of July, twenty-six volunteer nurses from the teachers' school at Rude near Samobor, along with several doctors and other medical personnel, under the leadership of Marinić, began to intervene with the camp administration and Ustaše guards to improve the health of the children. The Ustaše propaganda soon took advantage of the improved condition of the children.

== Partial liberation of camp ==
The local Partisans had been advised of the presence of the camp and the children, probably by Branko Davila, a doctor who had worked at the pre-existing children's home on the camp site. At dawn on 26 August 1942, the Partisan 4th Kordun Brigade attacked the camp and dispersed the Ustaše guards. The children heard shooting and began shouting that the Partisans had arrived. Despite attempts by the nuns to hide the children, Partisan troops broke into the buildings and rescued many children. Some of the fighters even found a brother or sister within the camp. The Partisans gave what food they had to the children, and led away from the camp all the children who could walk.

According to Fumić, the weaker and ill children were lodged with compassionate local peasants, but 350 of the strongest children were taken away by the fighters. According to Lukić, a total of 727 children were liberated from the camp, but at the first rest stop at Svetojanska, medical examinations by Davila identified about 400 weak and sick children who could no longer walk, and they were returned to Jastrebarsko. Davila estimates the number of children actually liberated from the camp at around 400.

During the march through vineyards and cornfields, the emaciated children ate as much as they could. Lukić states that the Partisans rested the remaining children at Žumberak for a day, before arranging for them to be transferred across the Kupa river into liberated areas of the Bosanska Krajina. According to one survivor, Mihajlo Veljić, some of the children who were liberated from the camp by the Partisans in August 1942 were placed with families in the Žumberak district and were subsequently re-captured by the Ustaše. Some were killed and others were returned to the camp.

== Closure and aftermath ==
The Partisan attack on the camp and their liberation of a significant number of children brought the Ustaše to the realisation that this and similar camps for children could not be maintained. In late October 1942, 500 of the remaining children were dispersed to families in the surrounding villages by the Catholic aid group, Caritas. A total of 1,637 boys and girls were taken in by families in Zagreb, Jastrebarsko and surrounding villages. Of the remaining children, 113 were relocated to Bosanska Gradiška. The Jastrebarsko camp was then dismantled, although the castle continued to house about 300 sick children, many of whom remained there until the war ended.

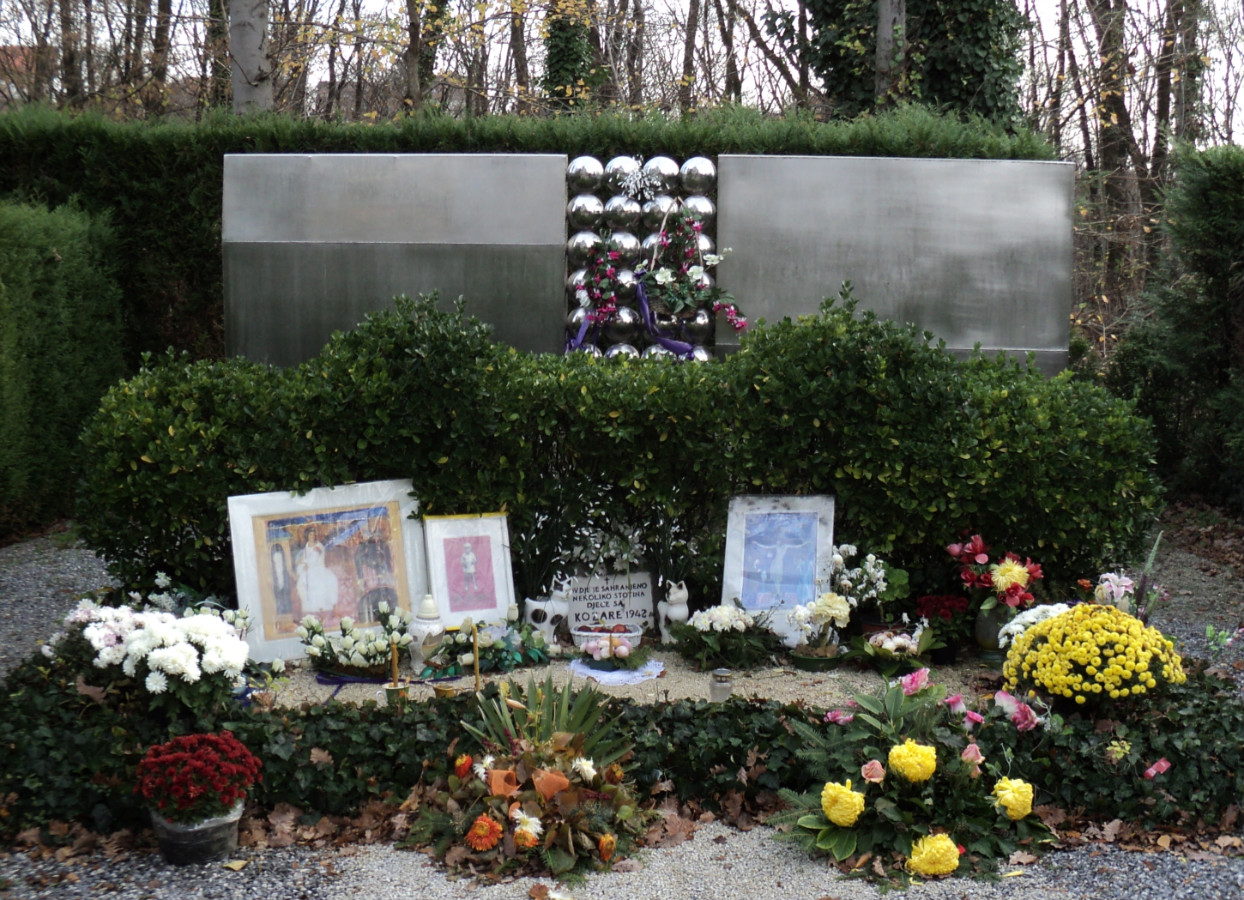
Monument at the Mirogoj Cemetery in Zagreb dedicated to the children from Kozara who died in Ustashe concentration camps

On 15 October 1944, Marinić filed charges against Pulherija and Gaudencija before the Croatian State Commission for the Determination of Crimes by the Occupiers and Their Supporters. Pulherija fled to Austria before the end of the war, the only nun working at the camp to do so. Gaudencija remained at the Children's Home, eventually moving to Ljubljana. Although she was sentenced to death by the Partisans after the liberation of Zagreb and her year of death is listed as 1945, there exists no firm proof or reliable source that confirms she was actually executed. No attempt to extradite Pulherija was ever made. According to Fumić, the inhumane actions of Pulherija and other nuns and their role in the deaths of many children has never been addressed, much less condemned, by the Catholic Church. Pulherija died in Austria in 1981.

Those children who survived the Jastrebarsko and Donja Reka camps did so only because concerned individuals from Zagreb, Jastrebarsko, and surrounding villages offered humanitarian aid. Among those who worked to alleviate children's suffering were Marinić, Budisavljević, and Davila. One survivor, Milan Vujić, was taken from the camp when he was sick and cared for until the end of the war by a Croatian family in Koprivnica. They had never accepted the Ustaše regime or its policies. Many Croats, he stated, took in and even adopted children from Jastrebarsko and treated them kindly.

On 26 August 2010, the 68th anniversary of the partial liberation of the camp by the Partisans, children who died at the camp were commemorated in a ceremony at a monument in the Jastrebarsko cemetery. It was attended by only 40 people, mainly members of the Union of Anti-Fascist Fighters and Anti-Fascists of the Republic of Croatia. No journalists, locals, politicians or officials attended the memorial, aside from the local deputy mayor, Aleksandar Stanić, who said that the locals "have nothing to do with what happened in the camps".

In 2022, the Serbian Orthodox Church canonized the victims of the camp along with those of the Sisak II children's camp as the "Saint children martyrs of Jastrebarsko and Sisak". In response, the Roman Catholic Archdiocese of Zagreb sent a letter to Patriarch Porfirije protesting the canonization, stating that "with regard to this matter, the Holy Synod of Bishops of the Serbian Orthodox Church has obviously accepted rhetoric and communist propaganda, full of untruths and manipulations, with which it is being attempted to blame innocent people for the alleged torture and murder of children, thousands of whom, owing to the love and care of Croatian Catholics, were saved from death and survived the difficult wartime conditions."

== See also ==
- Genocide of Serbs in the Independent State of Croatia
- Sisak concentration camp
- Erdödy castle, Kerestinec
