= Diana Budisavljević =

Austrian humanitarian

- Born: Diana Obexer; 15 January 1891; Innsbruck, County of Tyrol, Austria-Hungary
- Died: 20 August 1978 (aged 87); Innsbruck, Austria
- Known for: Humanitarianism
- Spouse: Julije Budisavljević (m. 1917)
- Relatives: Srđan Budisavljević (brother-in-law)

Diana Budisavljević (née Obexer; 15 January 1891 – 20 August 1978) was an Austrian humanitarian who led a major relief effort in Yugoslavia during World War II. From October 1941, on her initiative and involving many co-workers, she organized and provided assistance to women and children who were mostly Serbian Orthodox detained in the Ustaše camps in the Independent State of Croatia, a Nazi puppet state established in occupied Yugoslavia. The operation, known as "Action Diana Budisavljević", succeeded in saving around 10,000 children. After her story was better publicized in the 2000s and 2010s, she received substantial posthumous recognition.

== Early life ==
Born in Innsbruck, Diana Obexer married Julije Budisavljević in 1917, who at that time worked as an assistant at the surgical clinic in Innsbruck. By 1919, the couple had moved to Zagreb, at the time part of Kingdom of Serbs, Croats and Slovenes. Julije Budisavljević was an ethnic Serb (and brother of more well-known Srđan), who was known for founding the surgical clinic at the Faculty of Medicine, University of Zagreb.

== World War II ==
During World War II, Yugoslavia was invaded by the Axis forces in April 1941 and the Nazi-allied Independent State of Croatia began a genocidal campaign against Serbs, Jews and Roma, setting up numerous concentration camps in Croatia. After she learned about children held at Loborgrad concentration camp, she launched a relief campaign in October 1941 named Action Diana Budisavljević along with a number of co-workers, in particular Marko Vidaković and Đuro Vukosavljević. The primary purpose of the campaign was taking care of Serbian children and also women held in various concentration camps including the Jasenovac death camps.

With help from the local Jewish community in Zagreb, which had permission to support the camp inmates, her team sent supplies of food, medicines, clothes and money, first to Loborgrad and later to the Gornja Rijeka and Đakovo concentration camps. Her team also helped members of the Croatian Red Cross at the Zagreb Main Station, providing travel supplies for workers on trains that stopped there on their way to forced labor camps in Germany – some of those men, women and children returned to Zagreb after they were stopped in Maribor and Linz and were not allowed to travel further due to their illness and they were taken care by the Red Cross and the Action. During that work, in March 1942, Budisavljević met the head nurse, Dragica Habazin, who became a close collaborator in the following months and years in helping the inmates from various camps that were relocated to Zagreb and other places.

At the beginning of July 1942, with assistance from German officer Gustav von Koczian, she obtained written permission to remove children from the Stara Gradiška concentration camp and with the help of the Ministry of Social Affairs, in particular Professor Kamilo Bresler, she was able to transport the former child prisoners to Zagreb, Jastrebarsko and later also to Sisak.

After the rescue efforts in Stara Gradiška, Budisavljević, wearing a Red Cross nurse's uniform, oversaw the transport of children out of Mlaka, Jablanac and Košutarica camps. More than 6,000 children were removed from those camps in July and August 1942. After obtaining permission in August 1942 to move the children from state care in Zagreb to being placed in families, she and Kamilo Bresler worked together with the Zagreb Archdiocese branch of Caritas, thereby allowing thousands of children to be placed with families in Zagreb and in rural communities.

According to the Correction of the Report from Marko Vidaković in May 1945, Budisavljević stated that the campaign succeeded in saving about 10,000 children from the concentration camps. At the request of Kamilo Bresler in August 1942, she and Ivanka Džakula, along with some other co-workers, started to compile file-card information on children, based on transportation lists and sources from various institutions that retained their own files. By the end of the war the file database held information on approximately 12,000 children. Upon a signed request on 28 May 1945 by a Federal State of Croatia official named Tatjana Marinić, at that time Head of Ministry of Social Affairs, Budisavljević handed over the file-cards to the government. It is not known where they are now and whether they have been preserved or not.

Budisavljević described the course of the campaign in a diary, starting on 23 October 1941 and ending on 7 February 1947.

== Later life ==
Budisavljević was almost forgotten after the war, almost never mentioned at all in public, and when mentioned then described in ways inconsistent with what she had actually done, because the post-war authorities did not look favorably upon her. She lived in Zagreb with her husband until 1972, when they moved back to Innsbruck. She died on 20 August 1978, aged 87.

== Legacy ==
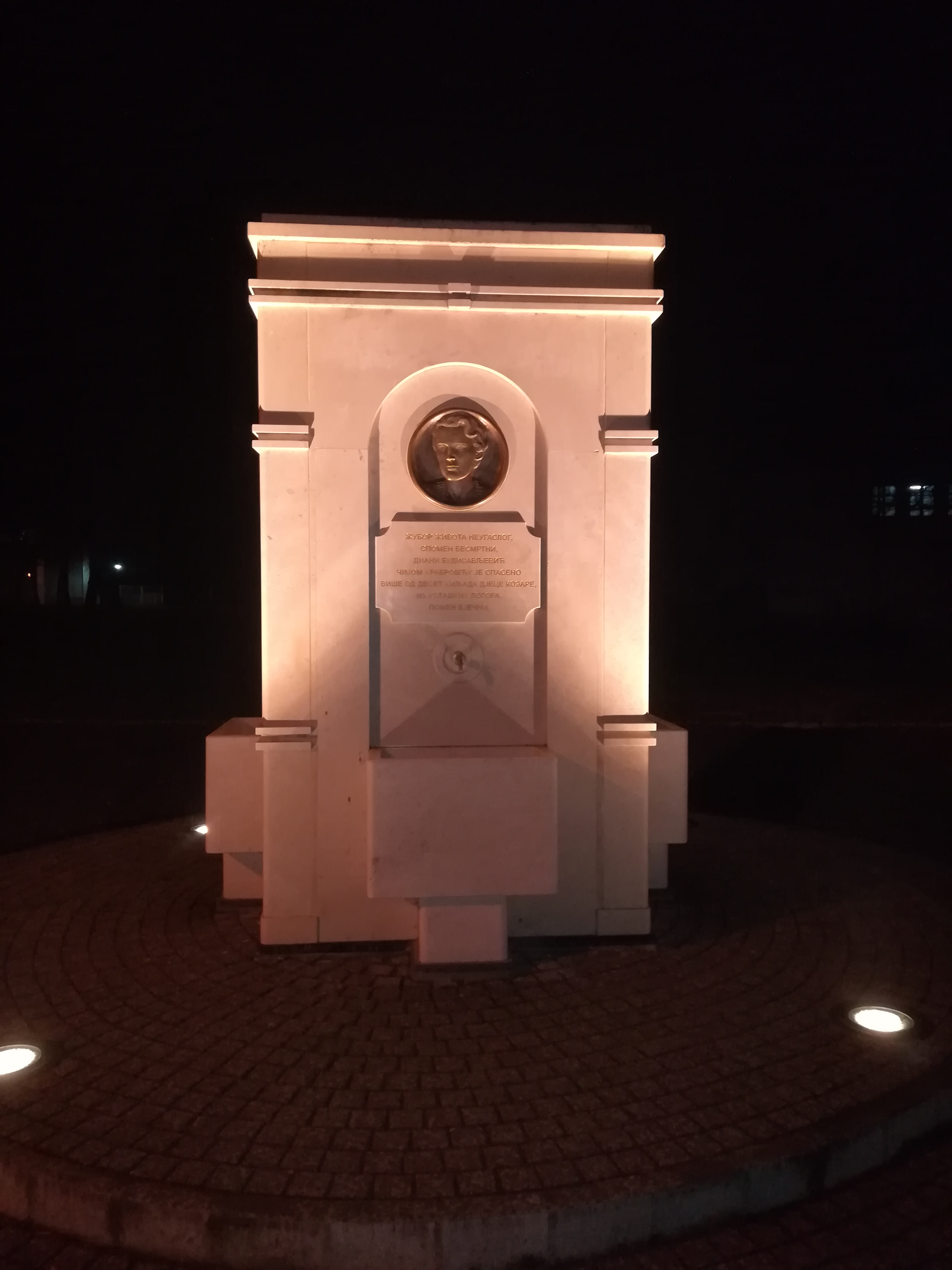
Diana Budisavljević memorial fountain in Gradiška, Bosnia and Herzegovina

In 2003, the Croatian State Archives published Budisavljević's war-time diary, translated from German to Croatian by Silvija Szabo. Silvija Szabo is a granddaughter of Budisavljević and a retired professor at the Faculty of Humanities and Social Sciences, University of Zagreb, who in 2005 stated that she had read an April 1983 Vjesnik feuilleton that had described Diana Budisavljević as a "mere Communist Party activist inside the Red Cross". She knew that that had not been the truth, so she decided to read Budisavljević's diary to learn the full extent of her grandmother's deeds.

A Zagreb film production studio Hulahop produced a documentary about Diana Budisavljević, titled Dianina lista, and produced by Dana Budisavljević and Miljenka Čogelja. The documentary won the prize from the EAVE European Producers Workshop at the When East Meets West Forum in January 2012 in Trieste. One of the authors is a distant relative of Diana Budisavljević's husband, yet had not heard of her heroism until seeing a 2009 documentary about Zagreb in World War II.

On 15 February 2012, the President of Serbia Boris Tadić posthumously decorated Diana Budisavljević with the Golden Medal of Miloš Obilić for courage and personal heroism. In October 2013, Serbian Patriarch Irinej posthumously awarded Diana Budisavljević with the high distinction of the Serbian Orthodox Church – the order of Empress Milica.

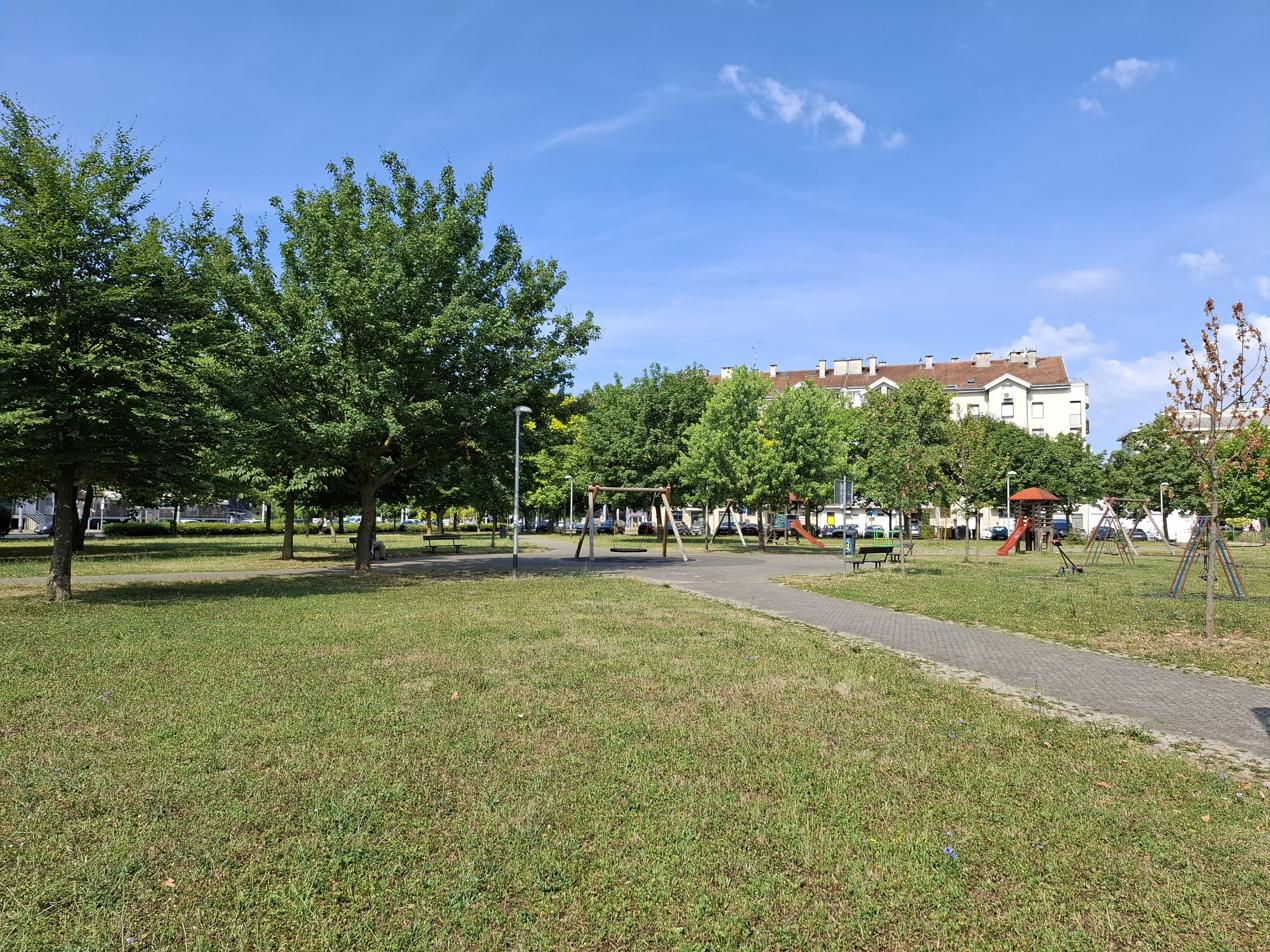
Diana Budisavljević Park in Dubrava, Zagreb, 2025

Since May 2012, a park in the Dubrava district of Zagreb has been named Park Diane Budisavljević. Streets in Belgrade, Kozarska Dubica/Bosanska Dubica, and Gradiška/Bosanska Gradiška have been named for Diana Budisavljević, and an initiative was active in 2015 to do so in Banja Luka as well. In October 2017, a Sisak park area with a memorial plate for children who were victims of genocide in the local concentration camp has been named Park Diane Budisavljević. In September 2018, the local district representation of Donaustadt (Vienna), decided to name a local alley Diana-Budisavljević Gasse.

In 2017, Radio Television of Serbia, the Serbian public broadcast service, made a TV documentary film Diana's Children focusing on her work and the testimony of the children still alive who were saved in Operation DB.

A feature film The Diary of Diana B. premiered at the Pula Film Festival in 2019, and won numerous Golden Arena awards.

Her birthplace on Maria Theresia Street in Innsbruck is known as Obexer House.

== See also ==
- Rescuers of Jews during the Holocaust

== Sources ==
- Mataušić, Nataša (July 2016). "Diana Budisavljević: The Silent Truth". In Ognjenović, Gordana; Jozelić, Jasna (eds.). Revolutionary Totalitarianism, Pragmatic Socialism, Transition. London: Palgrave Macmillan. pp. 49–97. doi:10.1057/978-1-137-59743-4_3. ISBN 978-1-137-59742-7.
- Ajduković, Marina (October 2006). "Djelovanje Diane Budisavljević: Rad s djecom stradalom u 2. svjetskom ratu" [The Activity of Diana Budisavljević with the child victims of World War II]. Annual of Social Work (in Croatian). 13 (1). Faculty of Law, University of Zagreb. ISSN 1846-5412.
- Kolanović, Josip, ed. (2003). Dnevnik Diane Budisavljević 1941-1945. Zagreb: Croatian State Archives and Public Institution Jasenovac Memorial Area. ISBN 978-9-536-00562-8.
- Piteša, Adriana (10 February 2012). "Dokumentarac o heroini iz doba NDH - Dianina lista: Žena koja je uspjela prevariti sistem i spasiti 12.000 djece iz ustaških logora" [Documentary about a heroine from the time of NDH - Diana's list: Woman who managed to cheat the system and save 12,000 children from Ustaše camps]. Jutarnji list (in Croatian).
