= Gornja Rijeka concentration camp =

Coordinates: 46.105°N 16.392°E

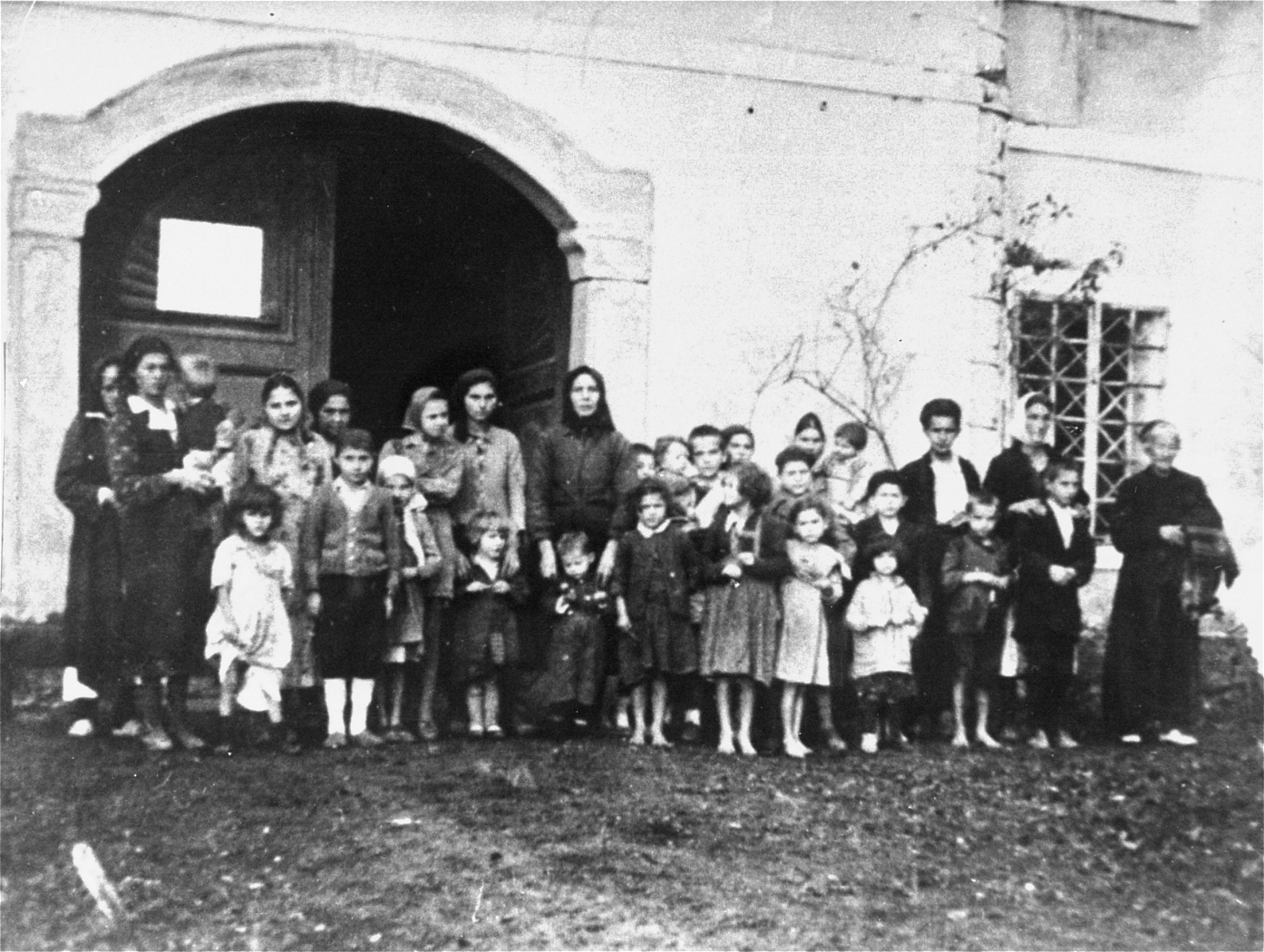
Women and children in the Gornja Rijeka concentration camp

During World War II in Yugoslavia, when the village of Gornja Rijeka, Croatia was part of the Independent State of Croatia, it was the site of a concentration camp.

A number of women, some of them with children, were interned there between November 1941 and the spring of 1942; the camp's population was estimated as between 200 and 400 at any given time. In February 1942, Diana Budisavljević's group acted through the government and the Red Cross to save 11 children from there, and in March a group of 147 Serbian women and children were moved from Gornja Rijeka to Loborgrad concentration camp and then on to Zagreb and Zemun, and in turn to camps in Germany and Serbia. In April, the remaining Serbian women were moved to Loborgrad, and then released. This left 73 Jewish women and 7 Catholic women in Gornja Rijeka. The latter, apprehended for "Communist propaganda", were soon moved to Stara Gradiška concentration camp, while the former were moved to Loborgrad in May 1942, emptying the Gornja Rijeka site.

On 24 June 1942, around 100 boys from one of the Jasenovac concentration camp sites were transferred to the site, run by Ustaša Youth members, and then on 4 July another 200 boys and girls arrived from the Stara Gradiška concentration camp. From June 1942, the camp housed approximately 400 orphans left behind from the Kozara Offensive.

After an outbreak of typhoid fever that caused around 140 deaths among the children, the camp guards abandoned the site in August 1942, and the Croatian Red Cross activists and doctors evacuated around 200 surviving children on 14 August 1942 to Zagreb hospitals and the Jastrebarsko children's camp.

== Sources ==
- Lengel-Krizman, Narcisa (1976). "Sabirni logori i dječja sabirališta na području sjeverozapadne Hrvatske 1941-1942.". Sjevernozapadna Hrvatska u NOB-u i socijalističkoj revoluciji (in Croatian). pp. 884–898.
- Dizdar, Zdravko (1990). "Logori na području sjeverozapadne Hrvatske u toku drugoga svjetskog rata 1941—1945. godine". Journal of Contemporary History (in Croatian). 22 (1–2). Zagreb: Croatian Institute of History: 83–110. ISSN 0590-9597.
