= Trebež =

Trebež may refer to:

- Trebež near Barajevo, an industrial zone near Belgrade, Serbia
- Trebež, Brežice, a village in Slovenia
- Trebež, Ivančna Gorica, a village in Slovenia
- Trebež, a village near Jasenovac, Sisak-Moslavina County, Croatia
- Trebež, one of the parts of the Lonja river in Croatia
