= Gornja Rijeka =

Gornja Rijeka may refer to:

- Gornja Rijeka, Croatia, a village and a municipality near Križevci
- Gornja Rijeka, Bosnia and Herzegovina, a village in the Rudo municipality
