= Jablanac (disambiguation) =

Jablanac is a village and bay in Croatia.

Jablanac may also refer to:

- Jablanac Jasenovački, a former village in Sisak-Moslavina County
- Jablanac bay (Cres), the northernmost bay on the island of Cres, Croatia
- Jablanac bay (Jablanac), the bay in the village of Jablanac, Croatia
- Jablanac (canal), a canal that runs into Lake Vrana (Dalmatia)
- Jablanac (cape), the northernmost cape on the island of Cres, Croatia
- Jablanac, an area near Benčani in Viškovo, Croatia
