= Drenov Bok =

- Village
- Location in Croatia
- Coordinates: 45°15′58″N 16°49′41″E
- Country: Croatia
- Region: Continental Croatia
- County: Sisak-Moslavina
- Municipality: Jasenovac

Area
  - Total: 17.8 km^{2} (6.9 sq mi)
- Elevation: 91 m (299 ft)

Population (2021)
  - Total: 82
  - Density: 4.6/km^{2} (12/sq mi)
- Time zone: UTC+1 (CET)
  - Summer (DST): UTC+2 (CEST)
- Postal code: 44324 Jasenovac
- Area code: (+385) 44

Drenov Bok is a village in central Croatia, in the municipality of Jasenovac, Sisak-Moslavina County.

== Demographics ==
According to the 2011 census, the village of Drenov Bok has 82 inhabitants. This represents 36.94% of its pre-war population.

According to the 1991 census, 89.64% of the village population were ethnic Croats (199/222), 2.70% were ethnic Serbs (6/222), and 7.66% were of other ethnic origin (17/222).

Population change 1857-2011
v

population	844	955	881	885	898	922	840	770	656	666	585	431	318	222	143	82
	1857	1869	1880	1890	1900	1910	1921	1931	1948	1953	1961	1971	1981	1991	2001	2011

Sources: Croatian Bureau of Statistics publications

== Sights ==
- Monument and memorial to the victims of the Jasenovac concentration camp
