= Zdenko Blažeković =

Croatian fascist (1915–1947)

Major Zdenko Blažeković
- Blažeković as a young man wearing the HAŠK's kit
- Born: 23 September 1915; Bihać, Condominium of Bosnia and Herzegovina, Austria-Hungary
- Died: 12 January 1947 (aged 31); Zagreb, Federal People's Republic of Yugoslavia
- Military career
- Allegiance: Independent State of Croatia (1941–1945)
- Rank: Major
Zdenko Blažeković
Personal information
- Position: Goalkeeper
Senior career*
Years	Team	Apps	(Gls)
1930–1934	Hajduk Osijek		
1934–1940	HAŠK		
- * Club domestic league appearances and goals

Zdenko Blažeković (23 September 1915 – 12 January 1947) was a Croatian fascist official and footballer who held several posts in the World War II Ustaše regime in the Independent State of Croatia (NDH). He was the student commissar at the Ustaše University Centre (USS), leader of the male Ustaše Youth organisation and a sports commissioner in the NDH.

Born in the town of Bihać, he graduated from high school in Osijek before applying to join a polytechnic college in Zagreb to become a builder. He was a member of various Croatian cultural and athletic organisations during his youth. He played as a goalkeeper for Hajduk Osijek and HAŠK football clubs.

Briefly a member of the Croatian Peasant Party (HSS), Blažeković was imprisoned several times by the Yugoslav authorities because of his involvement with various Croatian youth organisations, which saw him often involved in clashes with left-wing students. He joined the far-right Ustaše in 1939, and following the Axis invasion of Yugoslavia and the establishment of the Ustaše-led NDH in April 1941, went on to be appointed to the newly formed Ustaše supervisory committee by Slavko Kvaternik. That same month, he also became the leader of the Ustaše University Headquarters and the Ustaše Youth, charged with organising student bodies at the University of Zagreb and promoting the Ustaše's policy of preventing all non-Croats from attending universities in the country.

In 1942, he was involved in the formation of the 13th Ustaše Assault Company, and by 1943 had attained a seat in the Croatian Parliament. Between 1942 and 1943, he recruited students to join Ante Pavelić's bodyguard and was promoted to major. He held the position of head of the Ustaše University Headquarters and Ustaše Youth until January 1945, when he was appointed Commissioner for Physical Education and Sport. Blažeković fled Zagreb from the advancing Yugoslav Partisans in May 1945 and ended up in a refugee camp in Salzburg, Austria. In August, he was arrested by American forces who extradited him to Yugoslavia on 12 February 1946. He was tried in Zagreb on 12 January 1947, sentenced to death, and executed the same day.

== Early life and family ==
Zdenko Blažeković was born on 23 September 1915 in the town of Bihać, the son of local politician Emilijan "Milan" Blažeković. Ethnically Croat, the Blažeković family was descended from 15th-century tribesmen in the town of Livno.

Blažeković finished high school in Osijek. He played as a goalkeeper for Hajduk Osijek's first team since he was 15. Because playing football was forbidden to high school students, he played under the pseudonym "Bosanac" (the Bosnian). He left the club after graduating in 1934. Simultaneously, he was a tennis player, a Lawn Tennis Club member in Osijek, and a rower of the Osijek rowing club Drava, which he cofounded with his brother Boris.

He enrolled at the polytechnic college in Zagreb in 1934 to become a civil engineer. At the same time, he joined the HAŠK football club, where he was a second goalkeeper. HAŠK won the Yugoslav First League 1937–38 season, and in 1940, he left the club. In 1935, he became a member of the "Croatian Academic Society August Šenoa" (Croatian: Hrvatsko akademsko društvo August Šenoa, HADAŠ), and by 1936, he became its vice-president. For a short period, Blažeković was a member of the Croatian Peasant Party (Croatian: Hrvatska seljačka stranka, HSS). After leaving the party, he became involved in various Croatian youth organisations and was imprisoned several times in Zagreb and Osijek as a result. During this time, he was also involved in numerous violent confrontations with Communist students.

After attending a public celebration of HSS leader Vladko Maček's birthday on 20 June 1935, Blažeković was imprisoned by Yugoslav authorities and tortured for twelve days in prison on the island of Korčula. He was subsequently taken to Dubrovnik and charged with conspiring against the Yugoslav state but was acquitted. In 1939, he joined the Ustaše, a Croatian fascist organisation which advocated armed struggle in achieving Croatia's independence from the Kingdom of Yugoslavia. During this period, he came into contact with the fascist leader Slavko Kvaternik. From late 1940 to early 1941, Blažeković was pursued by Yugoslav authorities because of his association with the Ustaše and hid in Zagreb to avoid capture.

== World War II ==
=== Invasion of Yugoslavia ===
On 6 April 1941 Axis forces invaded Yugoslavia. Poorly equipped and poorly trained, the Royal Yugoslav Army was quickly defeated. The occupying forces then dismembered the country, and the extreme nationalist and fascist Croat leader of the Ustaše Ante Pavelić – who had been in exile in Benito Mussolini's Italy – was appointed Poglavnik (leader) of a newly established Ustaše-led Croatian state, the Independent State of Croatia (Croatian: Nezavisna Država Hrvatska or NDH). The NDH combined almost all of the present-day countries of Croatia and Bosnia and Herzegovina, as well as parts of Serbia, into what was described as an "Italian-German quasi-protectorate". Under the Ustaše regime, genocidal policies were implemented and directed against the Serb, Jewish and Romani populations living within the country.

=== Command of the Ustaše University Centre and Ustaše Youth ===
On 11 April, Kvaternik named Blažeković to the newly formed Ustaše supervisory committee. On 23 April, Blažeković led a crowd of more than 1,100 Croatian students as they gathered in the courtyard of the University of Zagreb before going to St. Mark's Square in central Zagreb to watch Pavelić give a speech. Here, Blažeković and the students swore loyalty to the Poglavnik and the NDH. In his remarks, Blažeković told Pavelić that he and the students were ready to follow him "in life and death". When the Ustaše supervisory committee was disbanded on 9 May, Blažeković was named a commissioner in the main headquarters of the NDH. That same month, he was named the commander of the Ustaše University Headquarters (Croatian: Ustaški sveučilišni stožer, USS). Although this organisation technically required all students in the NDH to become members, most kept away from membership. Increasingly, the USS became a wing of the NDH's student elite with strict rules of membership and privileges, with members attending rallies at which Pavelić spoke and wearing Ustaše uniforms.

In an interview with Novi list, Blažeković stated that all work at the University of Zagreb would be "in harmony with the new Ustaša spirit ... with which youth had been imbued for years in the decades when the university was the "battleground" of the Croatian struggle for liberation." He went on to say that the USS's priority was to promote students' social welfare and expand student dining rooms and residential halls. He declared that the structure of the university would change to conform with Ustaše principles – each faculty would have its camp, consisting of a camp leader and seven adjutants responsible for military training, socio-economic welfare, contacts, sports, professional training, education and journals. Blažeković explained that for the first year of academic study, the university would employ "veteran warriors" as teachers who were to be replaced by fully trained "younger forces" who had spent the previous year preparing for their new roles. Furthermore, he stated that student volunteers would collaborate in creating and popularising the USS and other Ustaše organisations, which, once they had established themselves in university life, were to establish a professional, non-ideological student organisation meant to incorporate all Croatian students. When asked if Serbs and Jews were to be permitted to attend universities in the NDH, Blažeković replied: "In the coming academic year, the university will be swept clean of foreigners hostile to Croatians and the Ustaše movement, and in this way our endeavours at the university will be made easier." Later, while dining with the wife of a Swedish diplomat, Blažeković boasted of the large number of Serbs he had killed, claiming that he placed the ears of murdered Serbs on a necklace worn over his smoking jacket.

At the same time that he was appointed the leader of the USS, Blažeković was also named commander of the male Ustaše Youth organisation. In its first months, many young Croats joined the movement, with recruitment being fuelled mainly by extreme Croatian nationalism. In addition, many were motivated to join because the Youth provided athletic, intellectual and artistic training for "the next generation of Ustaše leaders." For others, membership gave "a sense of meaning to their lives" and was appealing because it represented "a youthful rebellion against the Yugoslav state." By May, some Ustaše Youth camps publicly announced their refusal to accept new members as they could not do so. Although it is unclear how many young Croats joined the movement, Blažeković claimed half a million members. He defined the Ustaše Youth as a "secular movement" meant to promote "brotherly cooperation and mutual life" of peasant, working-class and intellectual youths in the NDH.

In late 1941, Blažeković's father was appointed mayor of Osijek, holding this position until 1942. That year, the younger Blažeković became involved in the formation of the 13th Ustaše Assault Company, using his position as commander of the Ustaše Youth to convince many young Croats to join. In February 1942, he became a member of the Croatian Parliament. Between 1942 and 1943, he recruited many students for Ante Pavelić's bodyguards (Poglavnikov Tjelesni Zdrug, PTZ). He was later promoted to the rank of army major. In 1944, he wrote a book titled The Youth and the State (Croatian: Mladež i država).

=== Commissioner for Physical Education and Sport ===
Blažeković held the post of commander of the USS and commander of the Ustaše Youth until January 1945, when he was named Commissioner at the State Directorate for Physical Education and Sports (Croatian: Državno vodstvo za tjelesni odgoj i šport, DVTOŠ) in the NDH. Upon taking this position, he introduced strict new sports laws that emphasised discipline during football matches and criminalised monetary and material rewards for athletes. Blažeković justified the new laws by saying: "Croatian sport is an amateur sport, and as such it will remain". Attempting to tackle the problem of unruly crowds, he introduced new laws banning disorderly spectators from ever entering football stadiums. Warnings by Blažeković and the DVTOŠ were regularly printed in daily party newspapers, calling citizens and athletes to abide by the new laws.

=== Capture and execution ===
As Allied forces descended on Zagreb, Blažeković left the city on 6 May 1945 and fled from Slovenia into Austria. He was subsequently placed in a refugee camp in Salzburg. On 28 August, American forces arrested him and sent him to a detainment camp before having him extradited to Yugoslavia on 12 February 1946. Blažeković was tried in Zagreb on 12 January 1947, sentenced to death, and executed the same day.

== Honours ==
HAŠK

- Yugoslav First League: 1937–38
