= Trebež, Croatia =

Trebež
- Village
- Location in Croatia
- Coordinates: 45°22′52″N 16°46′41″E
- Country: Croatia
- Region: Continental Croatia
- County: Sisak-Moslavina
- Municipality: Jasenovac

Area
  - Total: 13.0 km^{2} (5.0 sq mi)
- Elevation: 98 m (322 ft)

Population (2021)
  - Total: 39
  - Density: 3.0/km^{2} (7.8/sq mi)
- Time zone: UTC+1 (CET)
  - Summer (DST): UTC+2 (CEST)
- Postal code: 44325 Krapje
- Area code: (+385) 44

Trebež is a village in central Croatia, in the municipality of Jasenovac, Sisak-Moslavina County.

== Demographics ==
According to the 2011 census, the village of Trebež has 53 inhabitants. This represents 63.10% of its pre-war population.

According to the 1991 census, 79 residents were ethnic Croats (94.05%), 3 were ethic Serbs (3.57%), and 2 were Yugoslavs (2.38%).

Population change 1857-2011
v

population									53	109	129	86	39	84	77	53
	1857	1869	1880	1890	1900	1910	1921	1931	1948	1953	1961	1971	1981	1991	2001	2011

Sources: Croatian Bureau of Statistics publications

== Sights ==
- Monument and memorial to the victims of the Jasenovac concentration camp
