= Mlaka, Sisak-Moslavina County =

Mlaka
- Village
- Location in Croatia
- Coordinates: 45°14′06″N 17°01′26″E
- Country: Croatia
- Region: Continental Croatia
- County: Sisak-Moslavina
- Municipality: Jasenovac

Area
  - Total: 23.6 km^{2} (9.1 sq mi)
- Elevation: 94 m (308 ft)

Population (2021)
  - Total: 23
  - Density: 0.97/km^{2} (2.5/sq mi)
- Time zone: UTC+1 (CET)
  - Summer (DST): UTC+2 (CEST)
- Postal code: 44324 Jasenovac
- Area code: (+385) 44

Mlaka is a village in central Croatia, in the municipality of Jasenovac, Sisak-Moslavina County.

== History ==
Mlaka was the location of a Croatian concentration camp during World War II in this area. Mlaka and the nearby village of Jablanac Jasenovački were locations of forced labor of inmates of the Jasenovac concentration camp, after the population of the villages themselves was interned in the camp or forcibly transferred elsewhere. Inmates were also executed there, and five mass graves have been identified in and around Mlaka.

== Demographics ==
According to the 2011 census, the village of Mlaka has 58 inhabitants. This represents 16.76% of its population prior to the Croatian War of Independence (1991–95).

According to the 1991 census, 304 residents were ethnic Serbs (84.91%), 10 ethnic Croats (2.79%), 10 Yugoslavs (2.79%), 2 Muslims (0.55%), and others (8.92%).

Population change 1857-2011
v

population	955	1046	1038	1178	1059	1176	943	1106	231	307	526	425	361	346	30	58
	1857	1869	1880	1890	1900	1910	1921	1931	1948	1953	1961	1971	1981	1991	2001	2011

Sources: Croatian Bureau of Statistics publications

== Sights ==
- Monument and memorial to the victims of the Jasenovac concentration camp
