= Ustaše Youth =

Youth wing of the fascist, Croatian nationalist Ustaše movement

Ustaše Youth Ustaška mladež
- Leader: Ivan Oršanić (November 1941 – May 1944); Feliks Niedzielsky (May 1944 – May 1945)
- Founded: 4 November 1941
- Dissolved: 8 May 1945
- Membership: All Croat youth (officially); 500,000 (Zdenko Blažeković claim, 1941)
- Mother party: Ustaše
- Newspaper: Ustaše Youth journal

The Ustaše Youth (pronounced [ûstaʃe juːθ], Croatian: Ustaška mladež) was the youth wing of the Ustaše, a Croatian fascist organization active during the interwar period and World War II. The Ustaše governed an Axis puppet state called the Independent State of Croatia (Nezavisna Država Hrvatska, NDH) between 1941 and 1945.

Ustaše youth groups were first formed in the 1930s and became active by 1940. These groups were organized into a fully-structured organization on 12 July 1941. The organization was split into four sections by age and it was also divided geographically. Officially, membership was compulsory for all Croat youth. In practice, this issue came down to camp leaders and the recruitment drive in 1941 failed to achieve mass enrollment, after which the organization developed an elitist character. During 1941, Ustaše Youth members were involved in the genocide of Serbs and the Holocaust in the NDH. They also staffed two children's concentration camps, in which hundreds or over a thousand children died.

Activity of the Ustaše Youth took place in camps, of which there were two types: camps in the countryside where Ustaše Youth members gathered for rallies and excursions, and regional camps which were situated in unused school buildings or cinemas. Rural camps were established during a camping trip organized by the Ustaše Youth. They were "more or less successful" but their number significantly decreased by 1943. Regional camps were very strict but offered an opportunity for social mobility. Ustaše Youth members who attended these camps often exhibited rebellious behaviour and fierce competition between individual local camps was common.

The Ustaše Youth developed relations with the German Hitler Youth and the Italian Lictor Youth, which were seen as role models. It was also a member of a short-lived alliance of fascist national youth organizations called the European Youth Alliance. The Ustaše Youth also developed close relations with the Slovak fascist Hlinka Youth organization. Together, the organizations established joint camps held in both Slovakia and the NDH.

== Background ==
Youth groups were a major stronghold of radical Croatian nationalism in interwar Yugoslavia. Many short-lived militant youth organizations were formed in the 1920s, most of which disappeared quickly or were banned by the authorities because of their violent actions. The two largest youth organizations were the Croatian National Youth, founded in the spring of 1921 and intended for middle-class youths, and the Croatian Labor Youth, which aimed to prevent working-class youths from joining socialist organizations. After these two were outlawed, two more were founded: the Croatian Right Republican Youth led by Branimir Jelić and the Croatian Right Labor Youth, led by Marko Hranilović and Matija Soldin, who were both later executed on charges of terrorism.

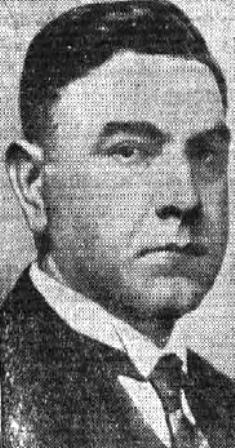
Ante Pavelić in the early 1930s

The Ustaše movement was established in 1930 by Ante Pavelić as an organization dedicated to achieving an independent Croatian state by all means, including terror. By the late 1930s, the Ustaše adopted the fascist principles of the Italian government, which gave it financial support and protection. During the 1930s, the Ustaše conducted several terrorist attacks, most notably the assassination of King Alexander I of Yugoslavia and French Foreign Minister Louis Barthou in Marseille in October 1934. In April 1941, when Yugoslavia was invaded and dismembered by the Axis powers, the Independent State of Croatia (NDH) was established as an Italian-German quasi-protectorate under the leadership of the Ustaše.

One of the most important components of the Ustaše movement's ideology was the youth. The idea that the revolution of the Ustaše was the revolution of the youth was widely shared in the movement. The Ustaše Youth journal wrote, "[t]o be an Ustaša means to be eternally young and eternally a warrior." Pavelić's most loyal supporters were part of the militant Croatian youth. The Ustaše presented their struggle as one between the young (supporters of fascism) and the old (supporters of democracy). Under the Ustaše, all those considered to be supporters of the old mentality – liberal democracy, plutocracy, and Yugoslavism – were to be destroyed. They were declared national traitors and put in prison camps where they were tortured.

In September 1941, the Minister of Education of the NDH, Mile Budak, discussed introducing radical changes to the puppet state's school system. He announced that all Yugoslav-era textbooks would be replaced with Austro-Hungarian-era books adapted to the Ustaše ideology. Budak wanted schools in the NDH to become "hothouses of Ustasha philosophy and patriotism." Universities and schools were to be ideologically purged. Budak said that teachers could save their jobs by "sincerely converting to the Ustasha cause." However, he also stated that schools could not be purged immediately because many schools would have to close then.

== Establishment and structure ==
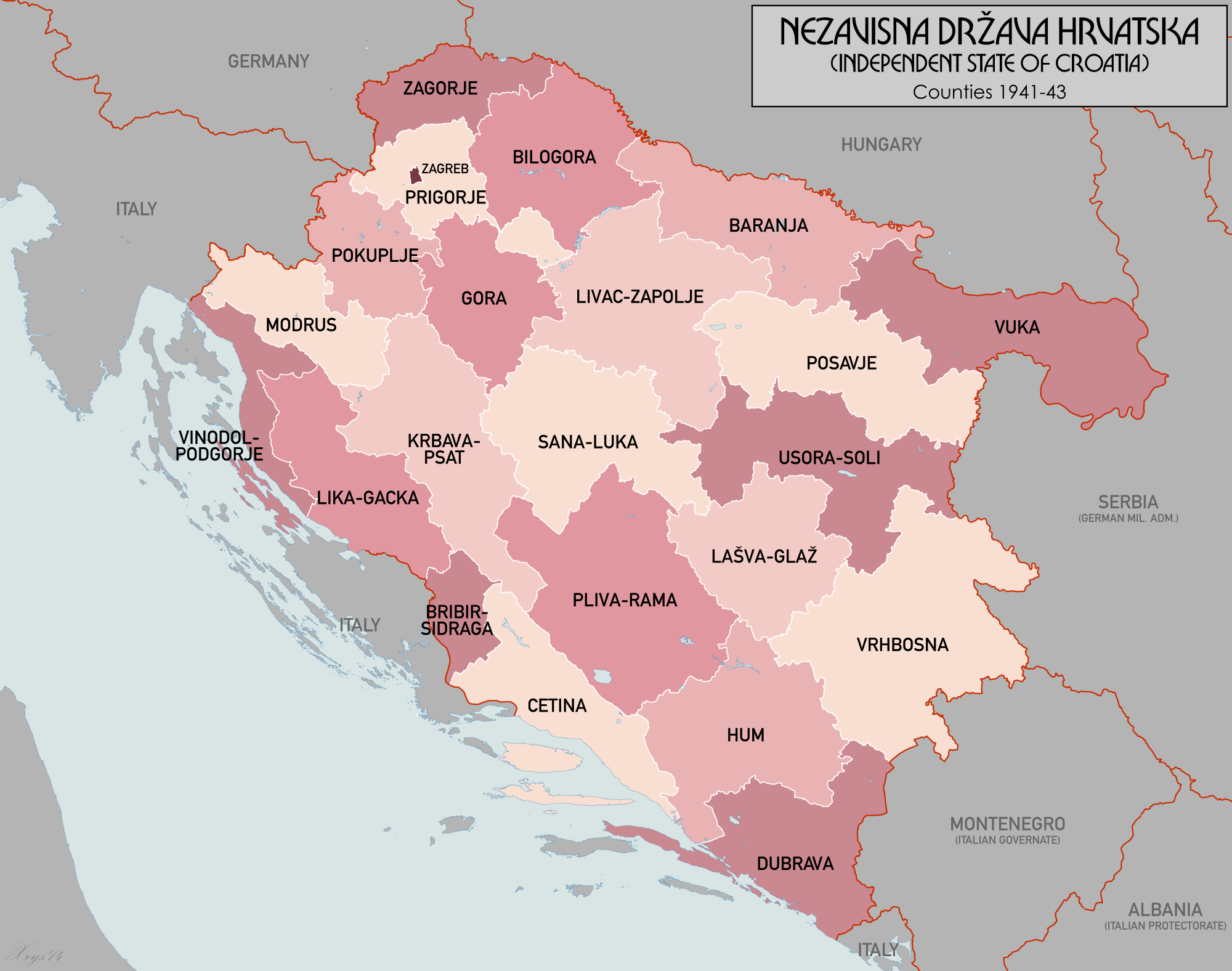
A map of the NDH depicting county subdivisions (1941–1943)

Ustaše youth groups were formed in the 1930s, and by 1940, regularly distributed flyers inviting Croatian youth to their demonstrations, activities, and rallies. On 12 July 1941, Pavelić decreed that these groups were to be organized into a fully-structured organization. The Ustaše Youth was officially intended to consist of all Croatian youths aged 7–21. (Note: Initially, the upper age limit was 18 but this was increased to 21 in a decree issued in November 1941.) The organization was divided into four sections: the Ustaše Hope (Note: Also translated as "Ustaše Mainstay") (ustaška uzdanica) (age 7–11), the Ustaše Heroes (ustaški junaci) (11–15), the Ustaše Starčević Youth (ustaška Starčevićeva mladež) (15–21), and the University Youth (sveučilišna mladež). A decree from November 1941 removed the University Youth section from the organization, which was replaced by the Ustaše Storm Troopers (ustaški jurišnici) and Ustaše Girls (ustaške djevojke) sections for male and female members aged 18–21, respectively. The best members of the Starčević Youth became members of the Ustaše Assault Unit, where they underwent strict paramilitary training. The Ustaše Youth was structured in a military manner and divided regionally and territorially. Each county contained an Ustaše Youth Center, each administrative division had an Ustaše Youth camp, and each community had a concentration. Concentrations had squads and platoons, the latter being split into branches according to age.

The leader of the Ustaše Youth operated from the Supreme Ustaše Headquarters and reported directly to Pavelić. This office was first assumed by Ivan Oršanić, who previously led the State Secretariat for Propaganda of the NDH. In July 1944, Oršanić was succeeded by Feliks Niedzielsky, who had previously served as the vice-governor of the great parish of Sana-Luka. Niedzielsky remained in this position until the end of the war. Male and female parts of the organization also had their leaders. Leader of the male part was Zdenko Blažeković, who was previously the commander of the Ustaše University Headquarters (Croatian: Ustaški sveučilišni stožer). The first leader of the female part was Mira Vrljičak-Dugački, a high-ranking official in Great Crusaders' Brotherhood (Croatian: Veliko križarsko bratstvo), a radical Catholic youth organization. In 1942, Vrljičak-Dugački was replaced by a leader of the female Ustaše Youth in Dubrovnik, Dolores Bracanović, who held this position until the end of the war.

Officially, membership in the Ustaše Youth was compulsory, as its founding statute stated, "the whole of Croat youth belongs in the Ustaše Youth." The founding statute also ordered the closing of every other youth organization. Liberal, Yugoslav, and leftist ones were outlawed, while right-wing radical ones were incorporated into the Ustaše Youth. Despite the statute making membership compulsory, this issue came down to Ustaše Youth camp leaders. Some, like Vinko Sablić in Dubrovnik, issued an order that all schoolchildren were required to join the Ustaše Youth and the only ones excluded would be "non-Aryans" and "Greek-Easterners". Others, such as Ante Boras in Petrinja, made membership voluntary.

== Actions ==
=== Recruitment ===
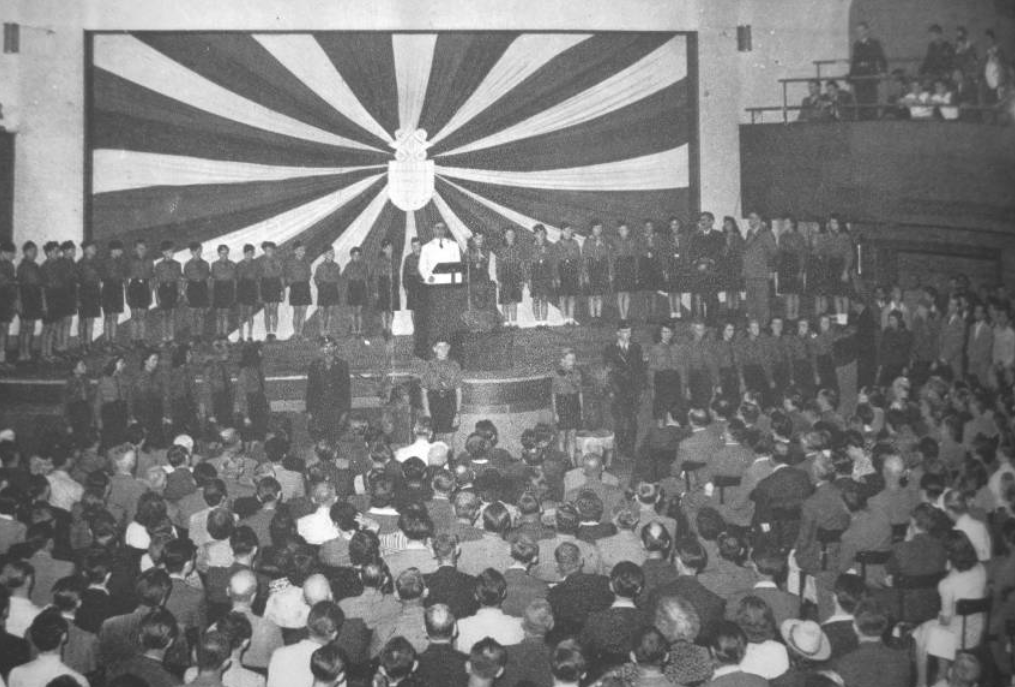
Ante Pavelić surrounded by Ustaše Youth members during his speech at the Workers Chamber in Zagreb in 1941

Ustaše Youth leader Ivan Orašnić warned that "anyone who sabotaged the Ustaše Youth would be destroyed." Financial penalties were imposed on parents who forbade their children from attending lessons at Ustaše Youth camps. Thousands initially joined the Ustaše Youth, drawn by the athletic, intellectual, and artistic training the organization provided. Nevertheless, the recruitment drive in 1941 failed to achieve mass enrollment, as most youths showed no interest in joining. Although Blažeković claimed a figure of 500,000 members, the historian Rory Yeomans has described this as "unlikely". After its mass recruiting drive failed, the Ustaše Youth assumed an increasingly selective and elitist character. Ustaše statutes of August 1942 established a probationary period of between four and seven months which every Ustaše Youth member had to serve in their local camp before being accepted as a registered member. Despite the professionalization of the Ustaše Youth, the organization retained the principle that all Croat youths should be its members.

=== War crimes ===
Ustaše Youth members took part in the genocide of Serbs in the NDH, as well as the Holocaust. According to eyewitnesses, many of the worst atrocities that were carried out by the Ustaše in 1941 were committed by youths. Survivors of the mass murders in Križevci and Karlovac testified that many armed youths participated in the killing and torture of Serbs and Jews. Members of the Ustaše Youth, together with the Student Militia of the Poglavnik's Bodyguard Brigade, perpetrated many of the first massacres in the NDH. On one occasion, Blažeković boasted about the large numbers of Serbs he had killed and claimed to have collected his victims' ears on his necklace. Two children's concentration camps were staffed by members of the Ustaše Youth. In the Jastrebarsko children's camp, between 449 and 1,500 children perished. In the Sisak children's camp, which was staffed by female part of Ustaše Youth, between 1,152 and 1,631 children died.

=== Ustaše Youth camps ===
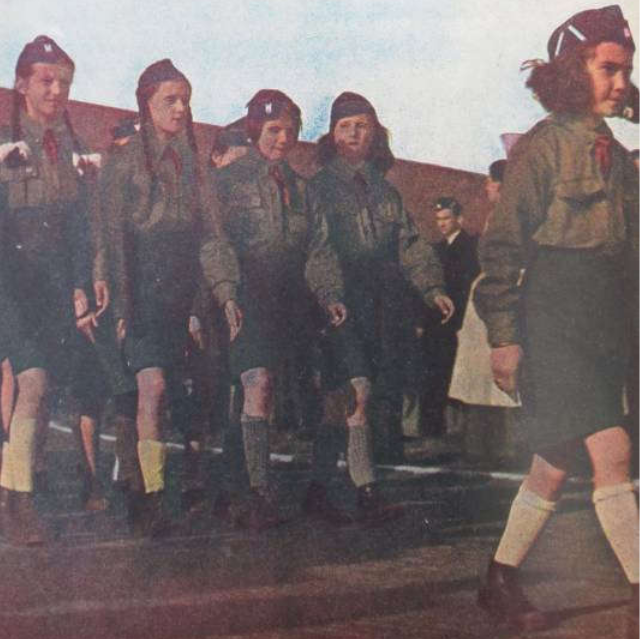
Female members of the Ustaše Hope marching in their uniforms

There were two types of camps organized by the Ustaše Youth: camps in the countryside where Ustaše Youth members gathered for rallies and excursions and regional camps which were also situated in unused school buildings or cinemas.

Countryside camps were set up during camping trips lasting at least three days in which Ustaše Youth members from various parts of the state would gather. These camps were split into two categories: taborovanje – consisting of three platoons and logorovanje – consisting of more than three platoons. The purpose of camping was to teach the youth the values of comradeship, sacrifice, duty, discipline, responsibility, and order. Ustaše manuals stipulated that such camps were to be fenced off and have a sign identifying them as Ustaše Youth camps, with an Ustaše Youth emblem at the main gate. A campfire, together with a mast flying the NDH and Ustaše Youth flags, was to be at the center of the camp. The camps' daily schedule included waking up at 6:00 a.m., morning exercise, working service, pre-military lectures, gathering around the campfire in the morning and the evening, and evening prayers. Various punishments were established to achieve discipline in the camps, and some Ustaše Youth members were expelled for violating the rules. According to the historian Goran Miljan, such camps were organized "more or less successfully throughout the regime period", but their number significantly decreased after mid-1943.

Yeomans writes that life in regional Ustaše Youth camps was "far less idyllic" than life in camps in the countryside. These camps were strictly hierarchical, with a schedule strictly worked out by the camp leader. Strictness in these camps resulted in a sense of camaraderie between the youths and their leaders. The camps provided an opportunity for social mobility, as youths of modest backgrounds could become noticed and appointed to important positions. After the ideological changes of 1942, some Serbs – motivated by the prospect of social mobility – began to apply for membership. Many were accepted, especially if they came from mixed Croatian-Serb backgrounds and had converted to Catholicism.

Many members of Ustaše Youth camps developed a regional identity and an independent spirit, which was a cause of anxiety for the central leadership. Rebellious behavior of the youth ranged from relatively harmless, such as watching banned or adult films, to the more serious, such as resistance to an initiative to admit Serbs in the camps. Regional independence combined with ideological militancy also created a fierce rivalry between local camps, which often resulted in what Yeomans describes as "a state of near civil war". Along with these problems, many Ustaše Youth camps also encountered a shortage of facilities.

== Relations ==
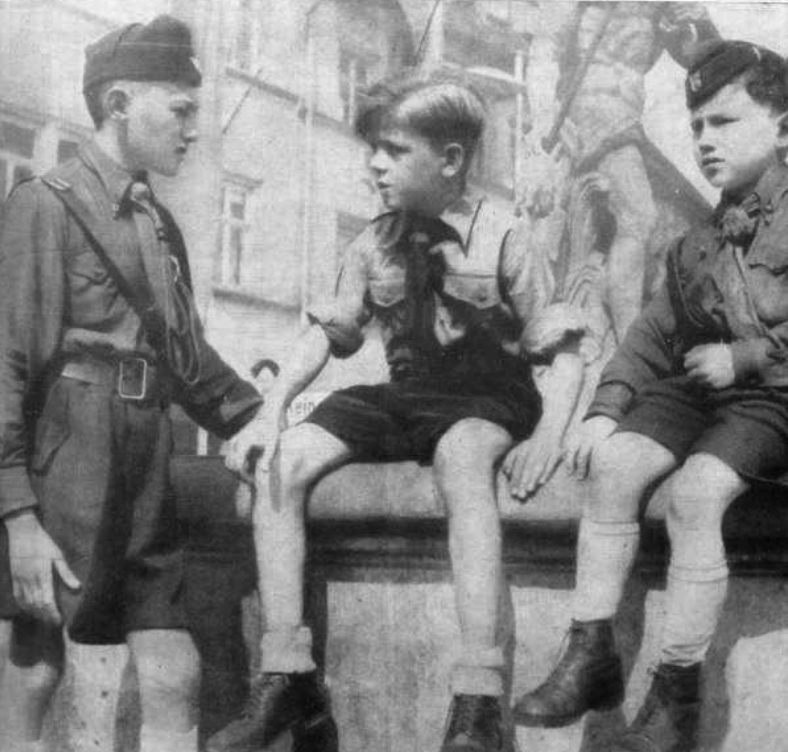
Two members of the Ustaše Youth (left and right) with a member of the Hitler Youth (in the middle)

=== Hitler and Lictor Youth ===
Nazi Germany's Hitler Youth and Italian Lictor Youth were seen as role-models for structuring and organizing by Ustaše officials. In August 1941, Ustaše Youth sent their representatives led by Ivan Orašnić to summer sports games held in Breslau. The representatives competed in swimming, athletics, and archery. One of the chief reasons for this visit was for Ustaše Youth members to familiarize themselves with organizational offices, homes, sports halls, and sports fields. The presence of Oršanić along with 11 other high-ranking youth officials in the delegation made this visit also diplomatic and a political one with the goal of establishing firmer relations with the Hitler Youth. According to a contemporary Croatian news article, after games in Breslau, Hitler Youth invited Orašnić's delegation to Berlin "with the purpose of deepening friendly relations between the German and Croatian youth."

The high-point of relations with Lictor Youth came in September and October 1941. An agreement between two organizations was signed on 17 September 1941. The agreement stressed the need for close cooperation of the two organizations and for both youths to receive similar education. Lictor Youth made their institutes and academies free of charge for the Ustaše Youth. On 3 October, an Ustaše Youth delegation led by Oršanić made a return visit to Italy during which they visited several cities. Between 1941 and 1943, Ustaše Youth delegations regularly visited Italy to attend sporting competitions, cultural festivals, and ideological training courses. The most publicized Ustaše Youth visit was the one that took place in August and September 1942, when Dragutin Gjurić led 100 youths to a training course in Rome.

=== European Youth Alliance ===
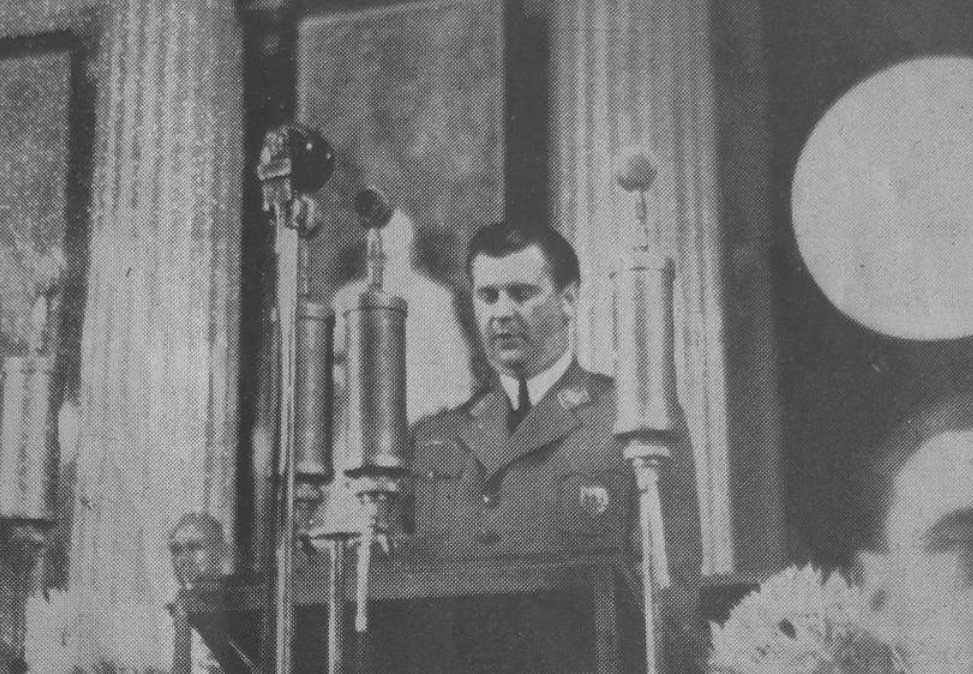
Ivan Oršanić giving a speech at the conference in Vienna

During the summer of 1942, Ustaše Youth participated in two large-scale international events of fascist youth organizations which were held in Weimar, on 8 June and in Florence on 3 July. In an interview for one Ustaše journal, leader of Hitler Youth Artur Axmann spoke of "European youth alliance", which he said could be formed already at the next meeting in Vienna. Axmann and Gauleiter of Vienna Baldur von Schirach organized the meeting in Vienna which took place from 14 to 18 September 1942. Representatives of 14 fascist national youth organizations attended this meeting and these organizations together comprised European Youth Alliance, established on the same meeting. The Alliance was divided into working communities, each headed by one or more youth officials from different countries. Oršanić became head of the Community for Official Youth Upbringing.

Unlike the press of Axis nations and occupied territories, the Nazi press gave very little coverage to this meeting for two reasons: German Minister of Propaganda Joseph Goebbels "polemicized very sharply against the talk of a “new Europe”" in his secret meeting with journalists and members of Spanish delegation influenced the final declaration of the meeting to not include condemnation of the Jews. Historian Wayne H. Bowen says that Nazi Germany "lost interest in uniting the youth of Europe" and that next conference of European Youth Alliance in Madrid, to which only eight nations sent delegates, was a "decided flop".

=== Hlinka Youth ===
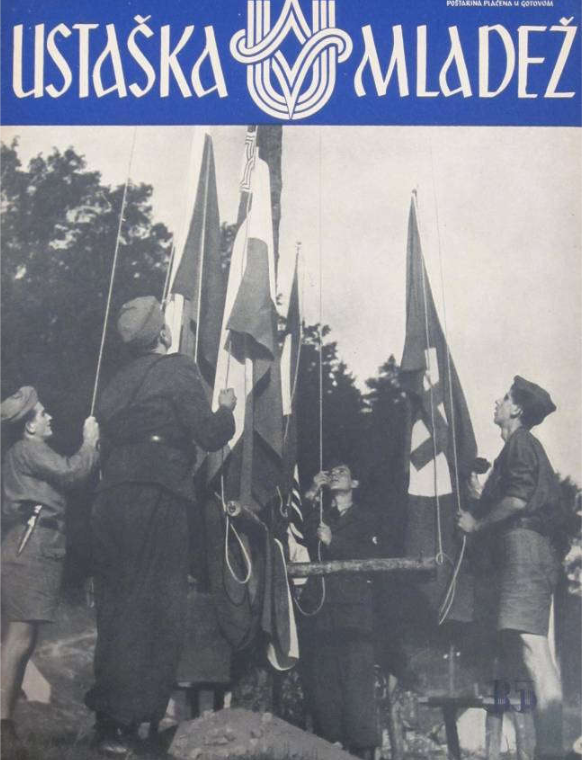
Front cover of Ustaška Mladež showing members of the Ustaše Youth and Hlinka Youth raising flags together during their joint camp in Ozalj

The Hlinka Youth (Hlinkova mládež, HM) was a youth organization subordinate to the Slovak People's Party, which governed the German client state known as the Slovak Republic. The HM and Ustaše Youth had similar structures and ideologies. Miljan argues that both of these youth organizations considered relations with each other "more suitable and meaningful" than with Hitler Youth or Lictor Youth. An Ustaše Youth delegation visited Slovakia for the first time in July–August 1941 to observe their work in schools and camps. Relations were further improved when HM leader Alojz Macek headed a delegation that visited the NDH in October 1941. The delegation arrived in Zagreb on 16 October, visited several other cities, and observed the work of the Ustaše Youth. In December 1941, Oršanić and his delegation again visited Slovakia. On this occasion, they were welcomed by high-ranking Slovak officials, such as Prime Minister Vojtech Tuka, and received HM medals.

Ustaše Youth official Zvonimir Malvić was appointed envoy to HM headquarters in May 1942. Malvić served in this position as part of the NDH embassy in Slovakia. However, HM did not send an envoy to the NDH. Oršanić wrote to Malvić regarding this issue in November 1942. Malvić replied that he had spoken with Macek, who said that HM could not afford to dispatch an envoy and that it lacked qualified members who could fill this position. HM never sent an envoy to the NDH and whether the reasons given by Macek were true or not remains unclear. Nevertheless, mutual visits of official delegations and journalists continued.

The official connections and exchanges were established in the summer of 1942, which saw several visits of youths to camps in a different country. The first of these was in Slovak city of Párnica, where twenty-eight Ustaše Youth members along with HM and Hitler Youth members stayed during July. The following month, thirty HM members attended a joint Croat-Slovak camp in Ozalj. There, youths slept in tents and received military pre-education courses on handling weapons. In September, a joint two-month course was held in the Croatian town of Borovo. During this course, youths listened to lectures mostly about each other's organizations, received courses military pre-education, gymnastics, and singing and language courses in both Slovak and Croatian.

By 1943, relations between the two organizations began to deteriorate. One of the primary reasons for this was the worsening of the situation on the Eastern Front, especially after the Battle of Stalingrad. Another reason was the growing anti-fascist resistance in both nations. The first major uprising in Slovakia occurred in 1944, while in the NDH, armed resistance had commenced in 1941. By 1943, the security situation in the NDH had significantly deteriorated. Relations between the two organizations, although almost halted, continued to exist until 1945.

== Uniforms and insignia ==
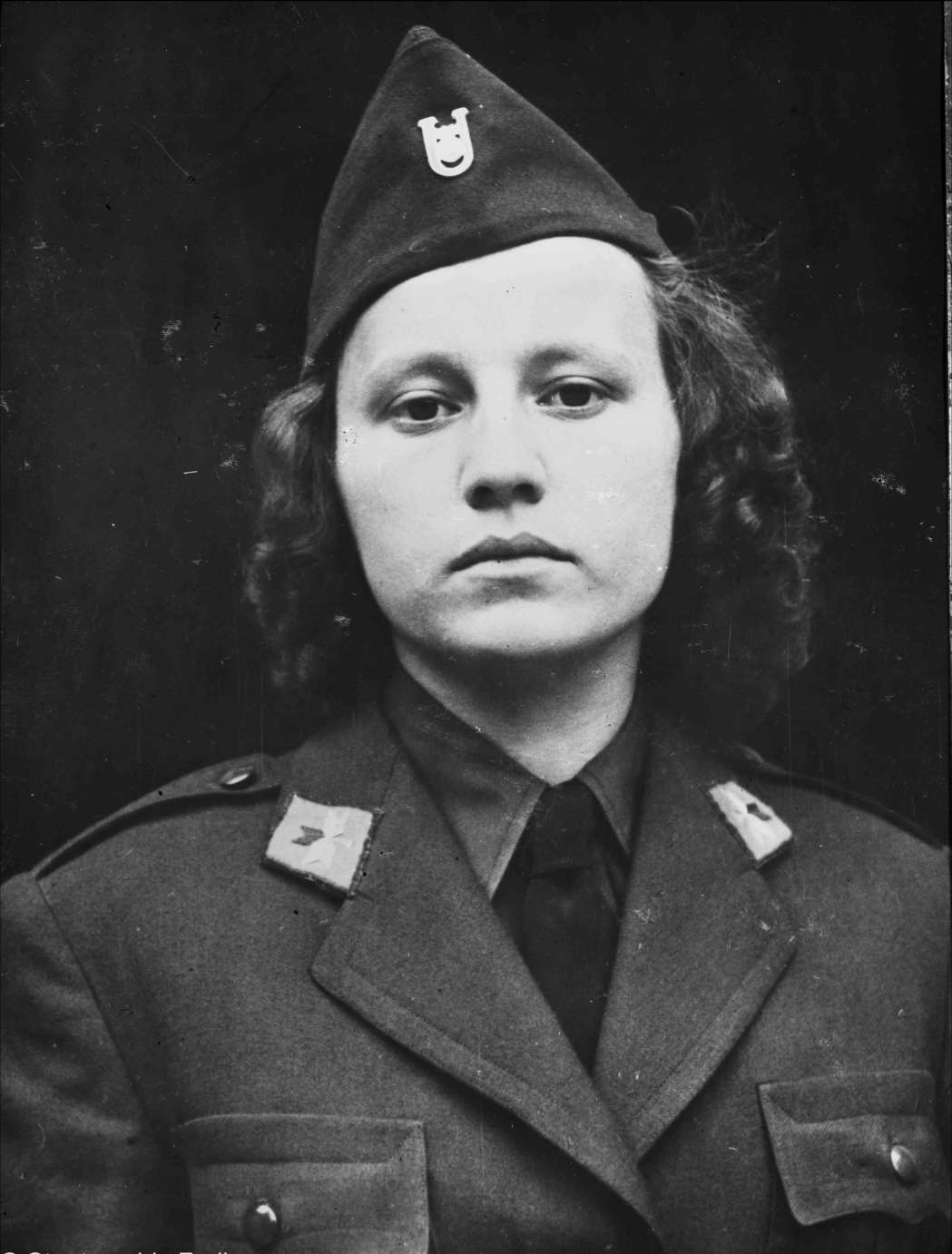
A female Ustaše Youth member in uniform

Male members of the Ustaše Hope wore green-brown shirts and shorts, brown belts, boots, a red scarf, and a cap with the capital letter U – a symbol of the Ustaše. Female members wore green-brown skirts while the rest of their uniform was the same as that of their male counterparts. Members of other sections had similar outfits, only differing in their scarves, Ustaše Hero had blue scarves, while Ustaše Starčević Youth had either a black scarf or a tie. Male members also carried a knife, the only permitted weapon for members, Ustaše Hero had a smaller knife while Ustaše Starčević Youth had a larger one. Uniforms were mandatory at any of the organization's public gatherings, meetings, and activities. Wearing the uniform in school was prohibited. This was done either to avoid conflict between Ustaše Youth members and the teachers or to highlight the teachers' roles as their students' superiors in the hope of mobilizing more teachers into the Ustaše.

With the exception of those who could not afford them, whose uniforms were procured and subsidized by the state, Ustaše Youth members had to pay for their own uniforms. Rules regulating who would receive state-subsidized uniforms were initially not established. Delivery of the uniforms was also problematic. Ustaše Youth in Koprivnica reportedly received cloth, linen, ties, trefoils, and buttons instead of uniforms. Clearer rules were established in March 1942 with the dissemination of the Rulebook on Distribution of Uniforms across the Independent State of Croatia. Inquiries and requests for uniforms were to be sent to the Administrative Command of the Ustaše Youth. The textile factory Velebit d.o.o. was contracted to produce Ustaše Youth uniforms. The exact price of such a uniform is unclear. One contemporary document places the price of an Ustaše Hope uniform at 800 kuna, while another puts it at 2,000 kuna, which Miljan considers "too high". In 1942, the Administrative Command of the Ustaše Youth took a loan of 500,000 kuna for the production of uniforms for those who could not afford them. Depending on the price of each uniform, this amounted to between 250 and 625 uniforms.

Leaders in the Ustaše Youth had an insignia above their left pocket to indicate their belonging to the local county, commune, or district. The symbol used by the Ustaše was a triple letter U with a double tendril.
