= Jablanac Jasenovački =

- Former village
- Location within Croatia
- Coordinates: 45.212°N 17.049°E

Jablanac Jasenovački was a village that existed in the vicinity of Jasenovac and near Mlaka in central Croatia, on the left bank of the river Sava. The village population suffered 182 deaths during World War II, and the Ustaše organization completely depopulated the village in 1942, proceeding to use its area for forced labor of inmates, from the Jasenovac concentration camp. After the war, only a few people returned, and because of the Sava flooding, the village was completely disbanded, in 1964.
