= Donja Reka =

- Settlement
- Location within Croatia
- Country: Croatia
- County: Zagreb
- Town: Jastrebarsko

Area
  - Total: 2.0 km^{2} (0.77 sq mi)

Population (2021)
  - Total: 327
  - Density: 160/km^{2} (420/sq mi)
- Time zone: UTC+1 (CET)
  - Summer (DST): UTC+2 (CEST)

Donja Reka is a settlement in the Jastrebarsko administrative area of Zagreb County, Croatia. As of 2011 it had a population of 349.

== History ==
The DVD "Palma" was founded here in 1850.
