= Gornja Rijeka, Croatia =

Gornja Rijeka
- Interactive map of Gornja Rijeka
- Location within Croatia
- Coordinates: 46°07′N 16°24′E
- Country: Croatia
- County: Koprivnica-Križevci County

Government
  - Mayor: Darko Fištrović (Independent)

Area
  - Total: 32.6 km^{2} (12.6 sq mi)

Population (2021)
  - Total: 1,559
  - Density: 47.8/km^{2} (124/sq mi)
- Time zone: UTC+1 (CET)
  - Summer (DST): UTC+2 (CEST)
- Postal code: 48260 Križevci
- Website: gornja-rijeka.hr

Gornja Rijeka is a settlement and a municipality in Koprivnica-Križevci County in Croatia.

According to the 2021 census, the municipality had 1,559 inhabitants, with Croats forming an absolute majority at 99.49%.

== History ==
In the late 19th century and early 20th century, Gornja Rijeka was part of the Bjelovar-Križevci County of the Kingdom of Croatia-Slavonia.

During World War II, when the village was part of the Independent State of Croatia, it was the site of the Gornja Rijeka concentration camp where several hundred children were interned by the Ustaše in 1941 and 1942.

== Demographics ==
In 2021, the municipality had 1,559 residents in the following 14 settlements:

- Barlabaševec, population 13
- Deklešanec, population 112
- Donja Rijeka, population 176
- Dropkovec, population 150
- Fajerovec, population 50
- Fodrovec Riječki, population 57
- Gornja Rijeka, population 331
- Kolarec, population 134
- Kostanjevec Riječki, population 226
- Lukačevec, population 13
- Nemčevec, population 11
- Pofuki, population 190
- Štrigovec, population 24
- Vukšinec Riječki, population 72
Gornja Rijeka: Population trends 1857–2021
v

population	1930	2122	2272	2531	2828	3226	3095	3430	3442	3513	3399	2919	2684	2330	2035	1779	1559
	1857	1869	1880	1890	1900	1910	1921	1931	1948	1953	1961	1971	1981	1991	2001	2011	2021

Sources: Croatian Bureau of Statistics publications

== Administration ==
The current mayor of Gornja Rijeka is Darko Fištrović (Free Voters Group) and the Gornja Rijeka Municipal Council consists of 9 seats.

Groups	Councilors per group
Free Voters Group	5 / 9
HDZ	3 / 9
Mreža	1 / 9

== Notable people ==
- Sidonija Rubido (1819–1884), opera singer. She helped establish the first elementary school in Gornja Rijeka.
