= Košutarica =

- Village
- Location within Croatia
- Coordinates: 45°15′36″N 16°57′11″E
- Country: Croatia
- County: Sisak-Moslavina
- Municipality: Jasenovac

Area
  - Total: 13.7 km^{2} (5.3 sq mi)

Population (2021)
  - Total: 207
  - Density: 15.1/km^{2} (39.1/sq mi)
- Time zone: UTC+1 (CET)
  - Summer (DST): UTC+2 (CEST)

Košutarica is a village in Croatia.
