= Jasenovac, Sisak-Moslavina County =

Jasenovac
- Municipality
- Općina Jasenovac; Municipality of Jasenovac
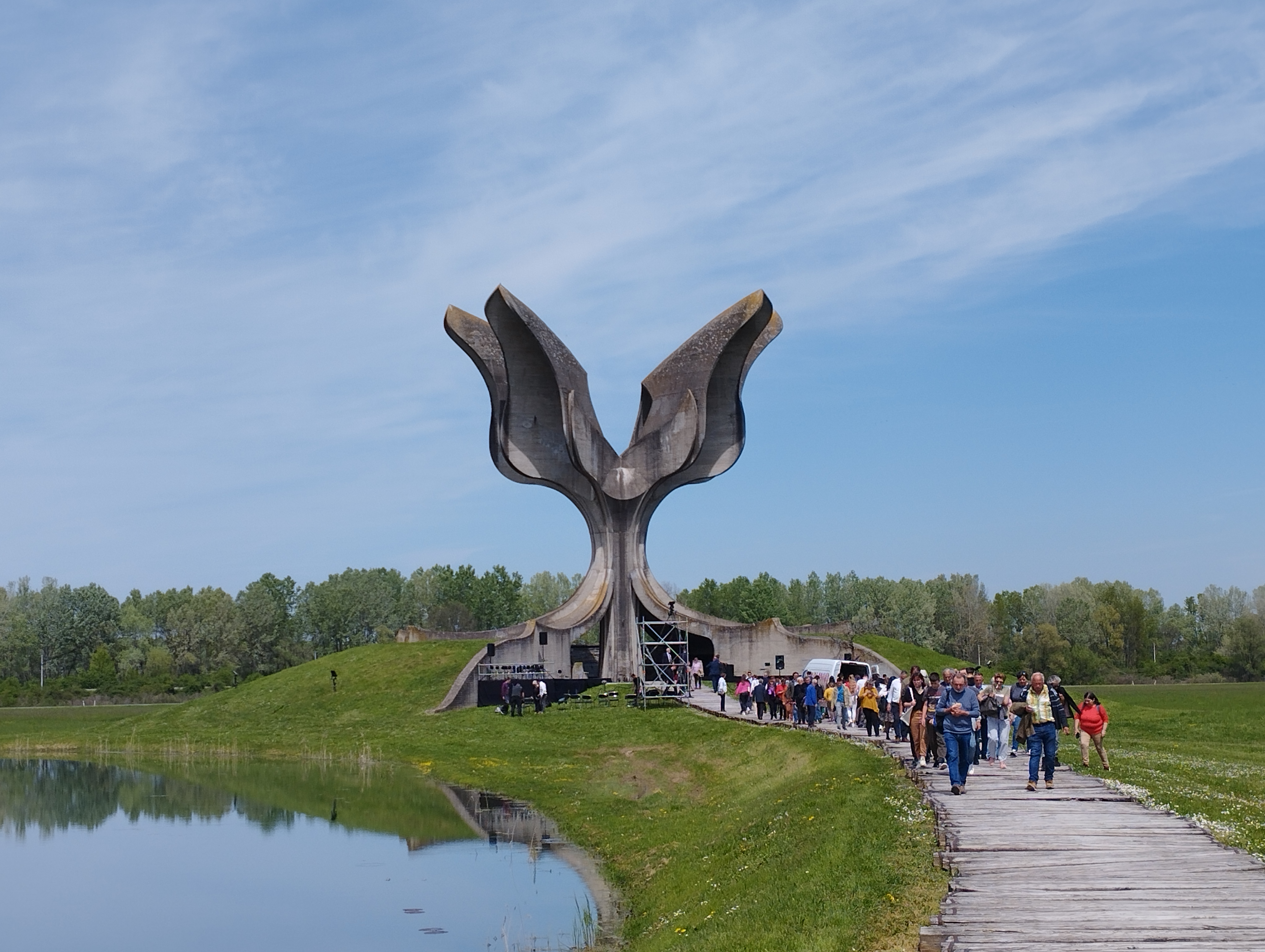
- Stone Flower
- Interactive map of Jasenovac
- Location within Croatia
- Country: Croatia
- County: Sisak-Moslavina County

Government
  - Mayor: Nikolina Srnčević (HDZ)

Area
  - Municipality: 163.9 km^{2} (63.3 sq mi)
  - Urban: 58.2 km^{2} (22.5 sq mi)

Population (2021)
  - Municipality: 1,559
  - Density: 9.512/km^{2} (24.64/sq mi)
  - Urban: 525
  - Urban density: 9.02/km^{2} (23.4/sq mi)
- Time zone: UTC+1 (CET)
  - Summer (DST): UTC+2 (CEST)
- Website: opcina-jasenovac.hr

Jasenovac (pronounced [jasěnovats]) is a village and a municipality in Croatia, in the southern part of the Sisak-Moslavina County at the confluence of the river Una into Sava. In Croatian "jasen" means ash tree and the name Jasenovac means "ashen, or made of ash tree".

Jasenovac attained notoriety during the Holocaust through the Jasenovac concentration camp giving its name to the Ustaše complex of WWII concentration camps in the context of the Genocide of Serbs.

== History ==
The Ottomans conquered Jasenovac in 1536 and that is the first mentioned of the little town Jasenovac.

Upon the conclusion of the Treaty of Passarowitz in 1718, Jasenovac was to be transferred to the Habsburg monarchy.

In the late 19th and early 20th century, Jasenovac was part of the Požega County of the Kingdom of Croatia and Slavonia.

During World War II, Jasenovac was the site of Jasenovac concentration camp and genocidal killing of more than 52,000 Serbs, which was subsequently designated as an act of genocide by Raphael Lemkin per the UN Genocide Convention and the Nuremberg Trial, perpetrated by the Croatian fascist Ustaše regime in the Nazi German puppet state known as the Independent State of Croatia under Ante Pavelić.

During the Croatian War of Independence, in 1991, Serb forces destroyed the local three-way bridge over the Una and the Sava linking the town to Bosnia and Herzegovina. The area was subsequently mined. During the retreat of 1st Krajina Corps in 1992 from area of Jasenovac looting and burning of Serb houses was recorded and this problem was discussed by regional council of SAO Western Slavonia. While in May 1993 Government of Republic of Serbian Krajina was informed by the local residents that 18 corps of Serbian Army of Krajina which are located in Jasenovac continue with burning of the houses, also they destroyed buildings and documentation of Jasenovac concentration camp. The town was taken over by Croatian forces as part of Operation Flash on 1 May 1995.

In 2005, a new three-way bridge was opened with financing from Croatia and the European Commission. Demining operations in the area were ongoing in 2009.

Jasenovac is underdeveloped municipality which is statistically classified as the First Category Area of Special State Concern by the Government of Croatia.

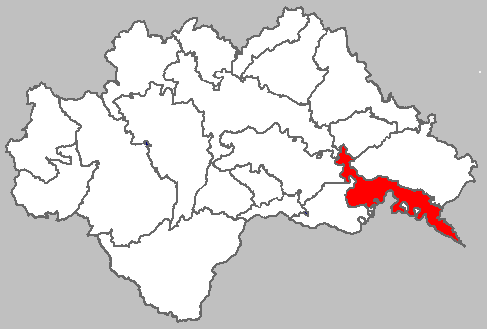
Image of Jasenovac Municipality within Sisak-Moslavina County

== Demographics ==
In 1991, the total population was 3,599, Croats made up 2,419 (67.21%), while Serbs were noticeable population with 911 (25.31%). In 2001, the municipality's population was 2,391, composed of 2,179 (91%) Croats and 141 Serbs (5.90%).

In 2011, the total population was 1,997, with 1,807 (90.49%) Croats and 152 Serbs (7.61%).

The municipality of Jasenovac consists of 10 villages:

- Drenov Bok - 143
- Jasenovac - 780
- Košutarica - 282
- Krapje - 179
- Mlaka - 30
- Puska - 321
- Tanac - 167
- Trebež - 77
- Uštica - 214
- Višnjica Uštička - 198

=== Austro-Hungarian 1910 census ===
According to the last Austro-Hungarian 1910 census, municipality of Jasenovac had 8,773 inhabitants which were ethnically and religiously declared as follows:

Population by ethnicity	Total	Croats	Serbs	Germans	Czechs	Hungarians	Italians	Ruthenians	Slovenes	Note
Drenov Bok	922	919	3	0	0	0	0	0	0	It consisted of two hamlets: Bumbekovača (pop. 9) and Drenov Bok (pop. 913).
Jasenovac	2,365	1,338	975	33	8	8	0	2	1	It consisted of two hamlets: Jasenovac (pop. 2,327) and Lončarice (pop. 38).
Košutarica	802	801	0	0	0	1	0	0	0	
Krapje	1,080	1,072	3	1	2	0	1	0	1	
Mlaka	1,176	37	1,138	1	0	0	0	0	0	It consisted of two independent settlements: Mlaka (pop. 823) and Jablanac Jasenovački (pop. 353) with two hamlets: Jablanac Jasenovački (pop. 350) and Jasenovački Strug (pop. 3).
Puska	832	797	29	0	0	0	6	0	0	Together with a settlement of Trebež.
Tanac	182	173	9	0	0	0	0	0	0	At the time of Census it was hamlet of the settlement of Uštica. Independent settlement from 1948.
Trebež	0	0	0	0	0	0	0	0	0	It was a hamlet of the settlement of Puska from 1948 as Trebež Krapjanski, and from 1953-1981 as Trebež Puščanski. Independent settlement from 1981. For Census data see: Puska.
Uštica	1,194	492	702	0	0	0	0	0	0	It consisted of three hamlets: Klenov Bok (pop. 7), Uštica (pop. 1,077) and Uštička Gradina (pop. 110).
Višnjica	180	180	0	0	0	0	0	0	0	At the time of Census it was hamlet of the settlement of Uštica as Višnjica Uštička. Independent settlement from 1948.
Total	8,733	5,809 (66.51%)	2,859 (32.73%)	35 (0.40%)	10 (0.11%)	9 (0.10%)	7 (0.08%)	2 (0.02%)	2 (0.02%)	

Population by religion	Total	Roman Catholics	Eastern Orthodox	Jews	Eastern Catholics
Drenov Bok	922	919	3	0	0
Jasenovac	2,365	1,380	979	4	2
Košutarica	802	801	0	0	1
Krapje	1,080	1,074	3	3	0
Mlaka	1,176	38	1,138	0	0
Puska	832	803	29	0	0
Tanac	182	173	9	0	0
Trebež	0	0	0	0	0
Uštica	1,194	489	702	3	0
Višnjica	180	180	0	0	0
Total	8,733	5,857 (67.06%)	2,863 (32.78%)	10 (0.11%)	3 (0.03%)

== Politics ==
=== Minority councils and representatives ===
Directly elected minority councils and representatives are tasked with consulting tasks for the local or regional authorities in which they are advocating for minority rights and interests, integration into public life and participation in the management of local affairs. At the 2023 Croatian national minorities councils and representatives elections Serbs of Croatia fulfilled legal requirements to elect 10 members minority council of the Municipality of Jasenovac but with only 6 members being elected in the end.

== Culture ==
Jasenovac is home to a library with over 10,000 items. Jasenovac celebrates May 1, the day of its liberation as part of Operation Flash, as its municipal holiday.

The village of Krapje in the Jasenovac municipality houses the headquarters of the Lonjsko Polje Nature Park: the largest protected wetland in Croatia.

== Sport ==
The municipality is home to the football club NK Jasenovac.

== Gallery ==
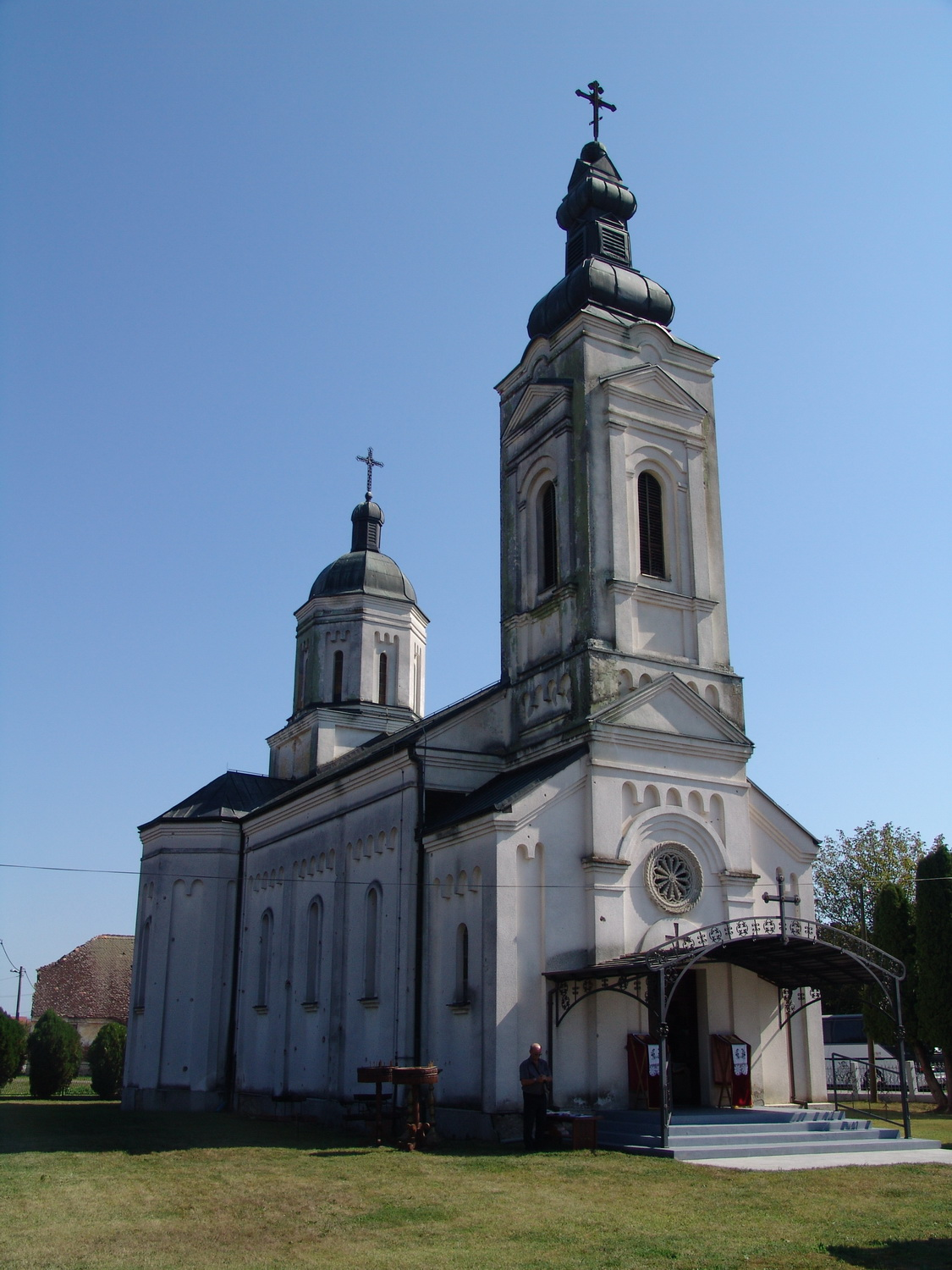
Monastery church

== Notable people ==
- Lazar Bačić
- Stanoje Mihaldžić

== Bibliography ==
- Roksandić, Drago (2007-10-01). "Posavska krajina/granica od 1718. do 1739. godine". Ekonomska i ekohistorija: časopis za gospodarsku povijest i povijest okoliša (in Serbo-Croatian) (3): 62–82. eISSN 1849-0190.
- Pelidija, Enes (1989). Bosanski ejalet od Karlovačkog do Požarevačkog mira 1699 - 1718 (in Serbo-Croatian). Sarajevo. pp. 237–259.
