= Croatian Red Cross =

National Red Cross Society in Croatia

- Hrvatski Crveni križ

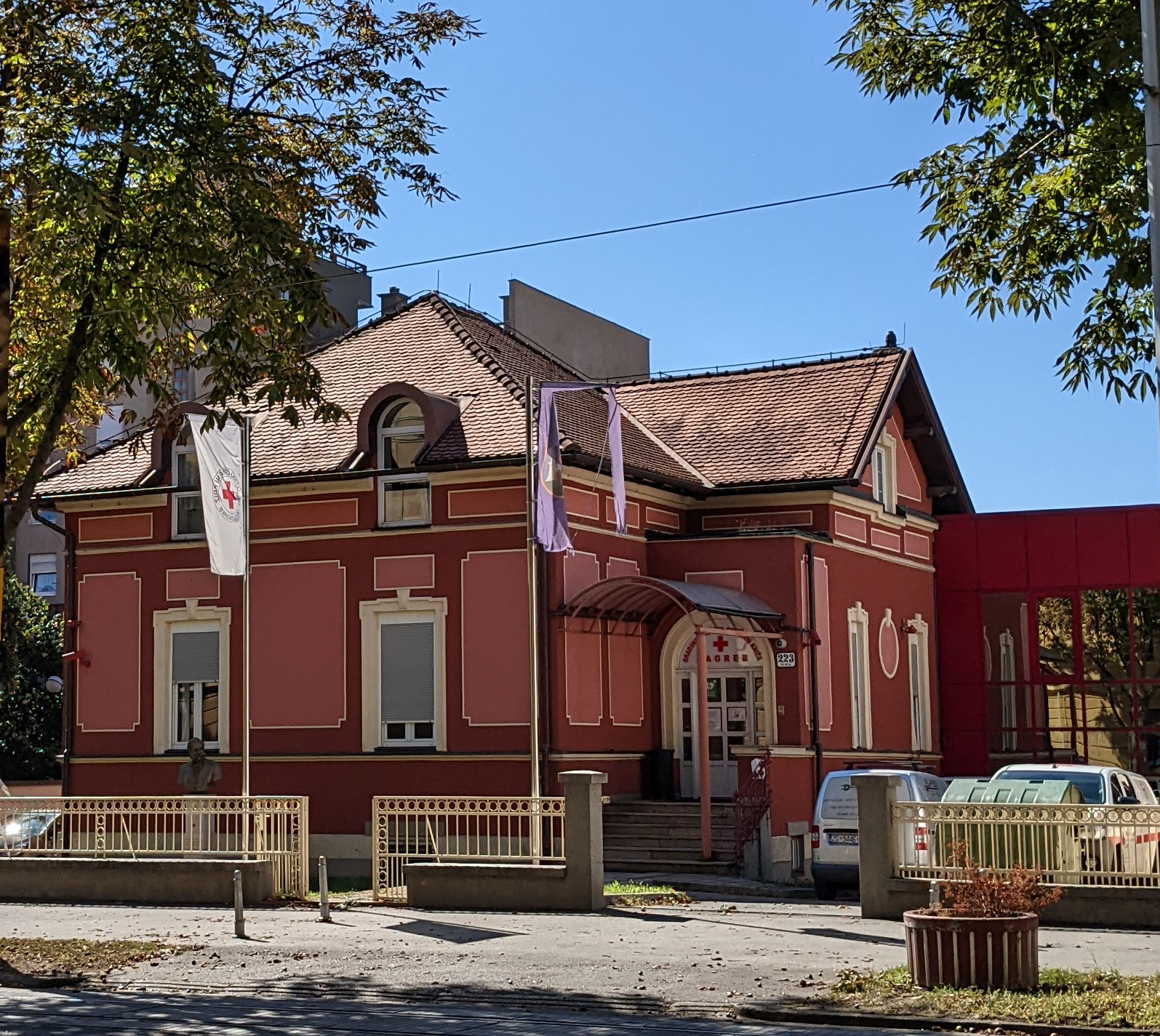
- Headquarters in Zagreb
- Formation: 1878; 148 years ago
- Type: NGO
- Legal status: charity
- Purpose: Humanitarian aid
- Headquarters: Zagreb
- Location: Croatia
- Official language: Croatian
- Staff: 550
- Volunteers: 370,000
- Website: www.hck.hr

The Croatian Red Cross (Croatian: Hrvatski Crveni križ) is the national Red Cross Society of Croatia.

The organization has over 370,000 volunteer members, as well as 550 professionals. The Red Cross has been active in the country since 1878.
