= Stone Flower (sculpture) =

World War II monument in Croatia

- Kameni cvijet (Croatian), Камени цвет / Kameni cvet (Serbian)
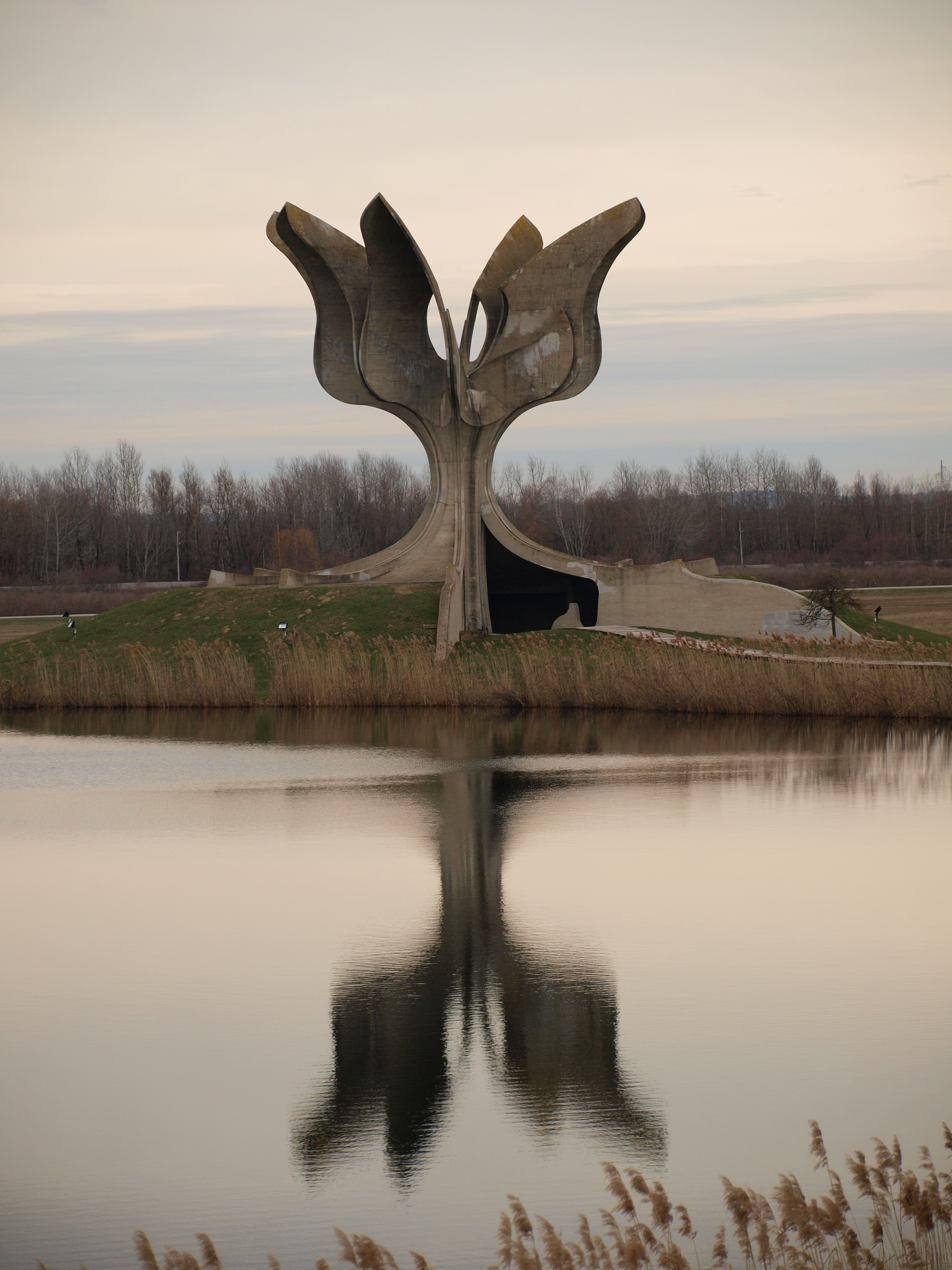
- Artist: Bogdan Bogdanović
- Year: 1966
- Type: Yugoslav World War II monument
- Medium: Concrete
- Movement: Brutalism
- Location: Jasenovac, Sisak-Moslavina County, Croatia; 45°16′49″N 16°55′42″E

Stone Flower (Croatian: Kameni cvijet; Serbian: Камени цвет, Kameni cvet) is a monument to the atrocities perpetrated in the Jasenovac concentration camp by the Ustaša regime during World War II in Yugoslavia: Serbs, Romani people, Jews, and Croatian dissidents of the regime. According to its author, the flower that opens its petals towards the sky and the Sun represents faith in life and rebirth, overcoming suffering.

Designed by Bogdan Bogdanović, the reinforced concrete monument was completed in 1966 on the grounds of the former Camp III (known as the Ciglana). It features a base containing six niches divided by concrete walls, with water basins running along their edges. Rising from this base is a central column that expands into the sculpted form of a flower. Within the niches, six trapezoidal slabs reach toward the upper structure. The monument's crypt is paved with railway sleepers, and on the northern side a bronze plaque bears verses from Ivan Goran Kovačić's war poem Jama.

== History ==
The site of the Jasenovac concentration camp remained without a formal memorial in the years following the end of World War II. It was not until 1952 that an initiative committee was established in Jasenovac to promote the construction of a monument "dedicated to the victims of fascism". The committee proposed the creation of a monumental memorial surrounded by a park. Eight years later, the central committee of the Association of Veterans of the National Liberation War (SUBNOR) launched a closed competition for the design of the memorial complex. Based on the submitted proposals, the concept by architect Bogdan Bogdanović was selected. While preparing his designs, Bogdanović was offered access to extensive archival material related to the camp—including documents, records, photographs of atrocities, and survivor testimonies—but chose not to consult them. Instead, he based the final form of the Flower monument on the idea of purifying the space. He conceived the structure as a symbolic, plant-like form. The exterior symbolism is "reflected in an unseen internal structure, representing a cosmic plant whose crown reaches the skies while its roots extend into the underworld". Bogdanović worked on the monument’s design and the surrounding landscape for nearly four years. Construction began in 1964 under his supervision, with the work carried out by the construction company from Novska.

In 2007, the author of the monument and the Jasenovac memorial site was awarded the Carlo Scarpa International Prize for the best architectural, artistic creation of a space for preserving memories.

== Gallery ==
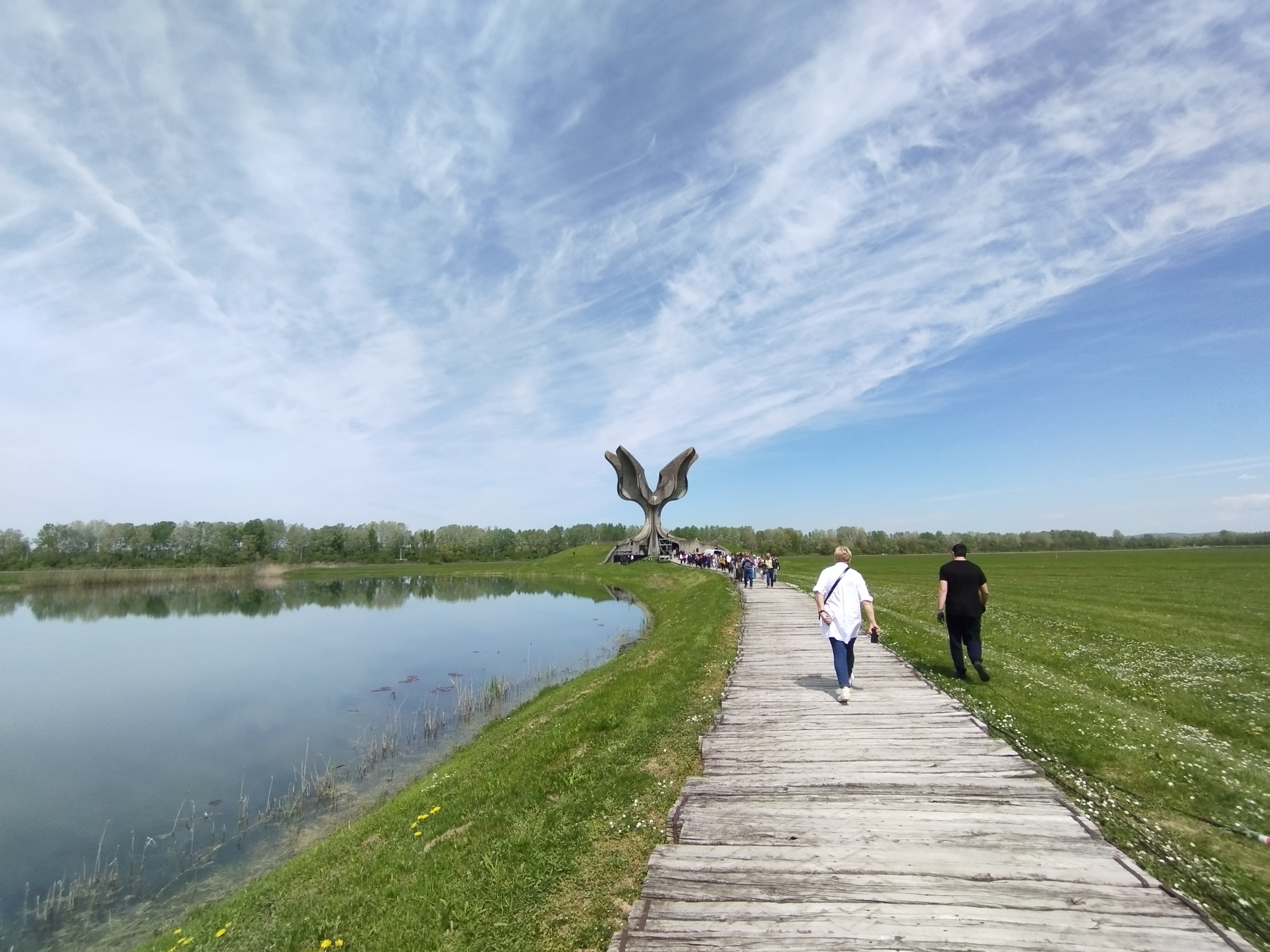
Monument from afar

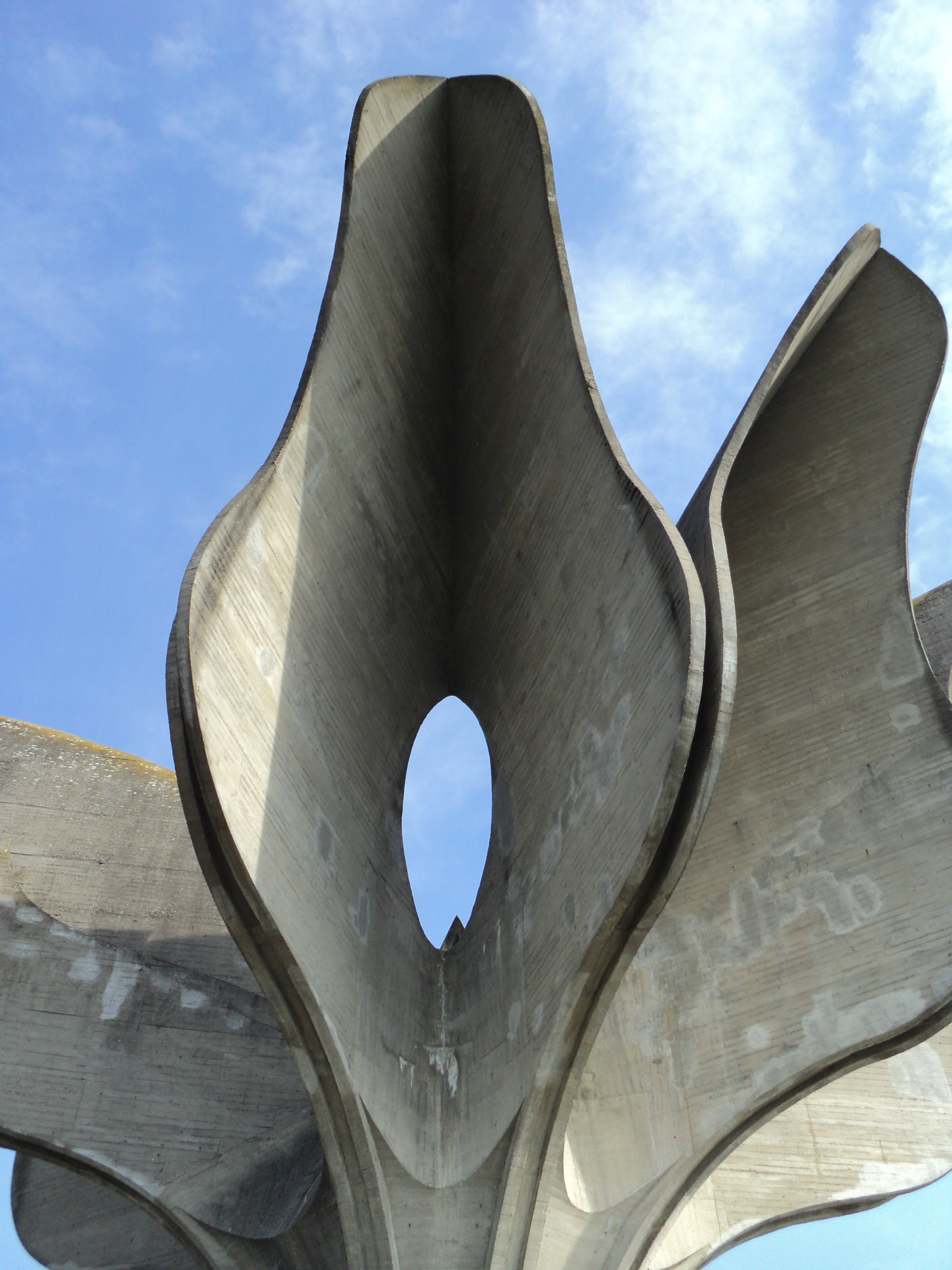
Petals

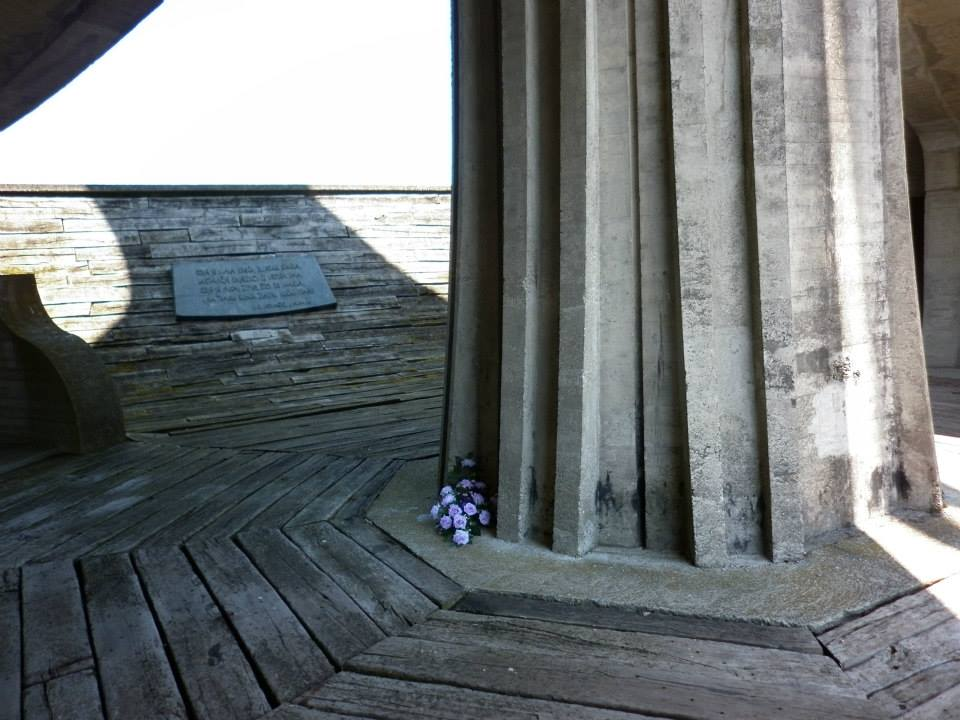
The crypt

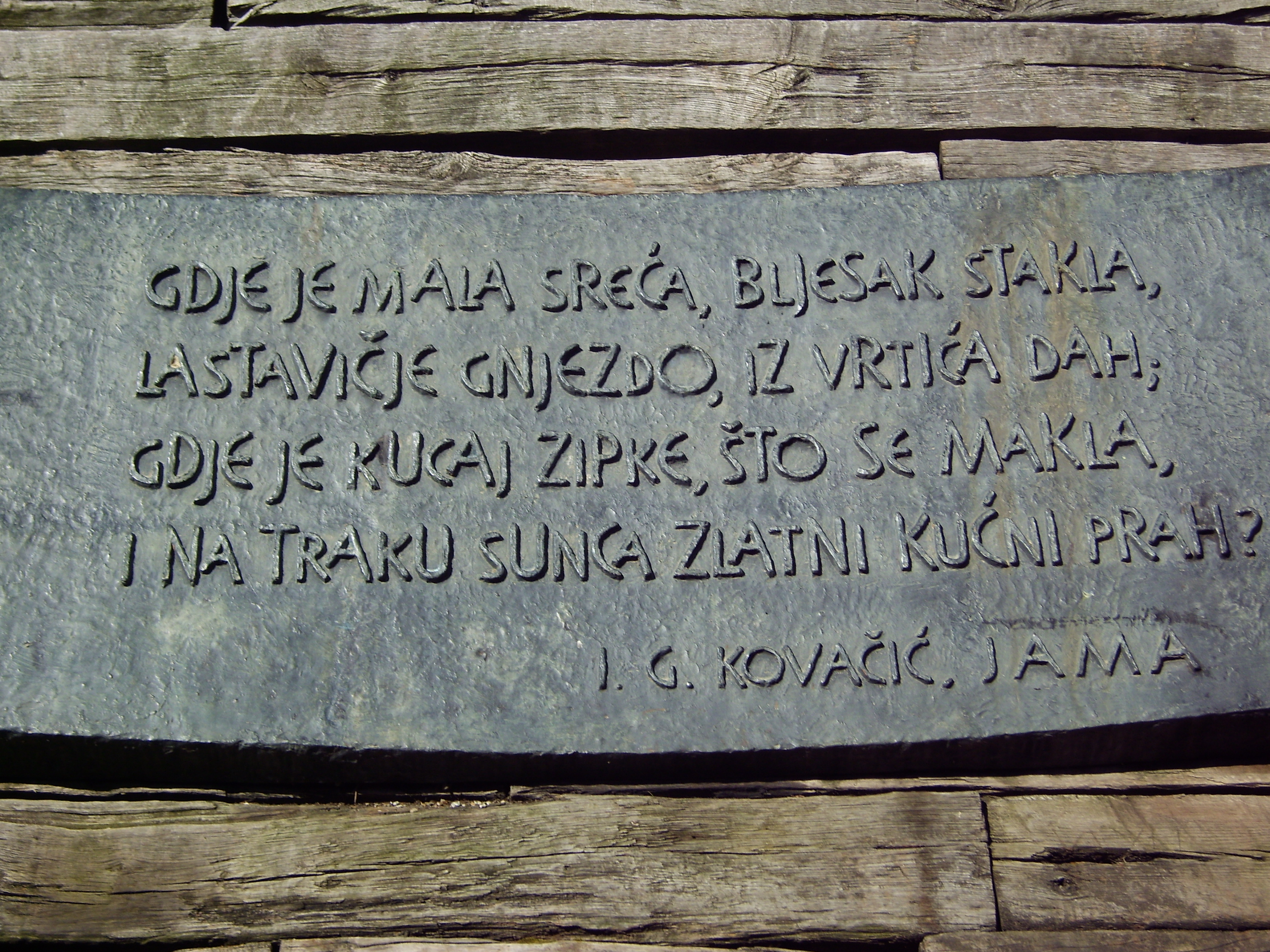
Excerpt from Jama

== Bibliography ==
- Jovičić, Nataša; Benčić Rimay, Tea; Bogdanović, Bogdan, eds. (2009). Geneza cvijeta Bogdana Bogdanovića. Banalnost zla. Jasenovac: Spomen područje Jasenovac. ISBN 978-953-99169-6-9.
