= Vlado Singer =

Yugoslav politician (1908–1943)

- Born: Vladimir Singer; 21 October 1908; Virovitica, Kingdom of Croatia-Slavonia, Austria-Hungary
- Died: October 1943 (aged 35); Stara Gradiška, Independent State of Croatia
- Cause of death: Murdered in Holocaust
- Occupation: Politician

Vlado Singer (21 October 1908 – October 1943) was a Kingdom of Yugoslavia politician and a prominent member of the Croatian Ustaše movement.

== Biography ==
Singer was born in Virovitica on 21 October 1908 to a Croatian Jewish family. Later in life he converted to the Catholic faith. He believed that for Jews in Croatia the only right way is total assimilation or identification with the Croatian national identity.

Singer's political activities began during his studies in Zagreb at the end of the 1920s and in early 1930s. He publicly led the University of Zagreb academics organized in the society called "Kvaternik". Singer with his colleagues, Branimir Jelić, Mladen Lorković and Dido Kvaternik, believed that the former political formations were dead and that a new movement which will be in charge of the revolutionary struggle needs to be created.

On 6 March 1932 Singer organized a demonstration at the University of Zagreb against the dictatorship of Alexander I of Yugoslavia. In March 1933 he started and edited nationalist paper "Naša gruda" (Our land). After only two published issues Singer was forced to exile in 1933. He moved to Vienna, Austria. In March 1934 he was arrested by the Austrian police at the request of the Yugoslav authorities in connection with an alleged assassination attempt of Petar Oreb against Alexander I of Yugoslavia. After six months he was released and moved to Italy. In Italy he resided in the Ustaša camps. Singer was again arrested after the assassination of Alexander I of Yugoslavia in Marseille, France. He was a commissioner of the supreme organ of Ustaša – Croatian Revolutionary Movement called Main Ustaša Headquarters and was described as a skilled organizer. While in Italy, according to Eugen Dido Kvaternik, only Singer critically looked at Ante Pavelić's way of life, but remained loyal.

In April 1941, Singer returned to Zagreb with Pavelić and other Ustaše leaders and was shortly after put in charge of the Special department of the Main Ustaša Headquarters. In mid-June 1941, he was put in charge of the Ustaše Surveillance Service (UNS) office.

On 14 September 1941 members of the communist movement performed a sabotage at the General Post Office in Zagreb. At the Nazis' request Singer was arrested in connection with this incident and he was imprisoned in Jasenovac concentration camp. While there, he was detained with Vladko Maček. In October 1943, after two year imprisonment, Singer was executed in the Stara Gradiška concentration camp. Historians, writers and associates relate Singer's arrest and liquidation with his Jewish background and Vjekoslav "Maks" Luburić's personal antipathy towards him.

== Bibliography ==
- Dizdar, Zdravko (1997). Tko je tko u NDH Hrvatska 1941.–1945. Zagreb: Minerva. ISBN 953-6377-03-9.
- Goldstein, Slavko (2007). 1941. - godina koja se vraća. Zagreb: Novi Liber. ISBN 978-953-6045-48-8.
- Goldstein, Ivo (2001). Holokaust u Zagrebu. Zagreb: Novi Liber. ISBN 953-6045-19-2.
- Jareb, Jere (1995). Sjećanja i zapažanja: 1925-1945 : prilozi za hrvatsku povijest. Zagreb: Starčević. ISBN 953-9636-90-6.
- Mužić, Ivan (1999). Maček i Luburić. Split: Laus. ISBN 953-190-080-9.
