= Villa Luburić =

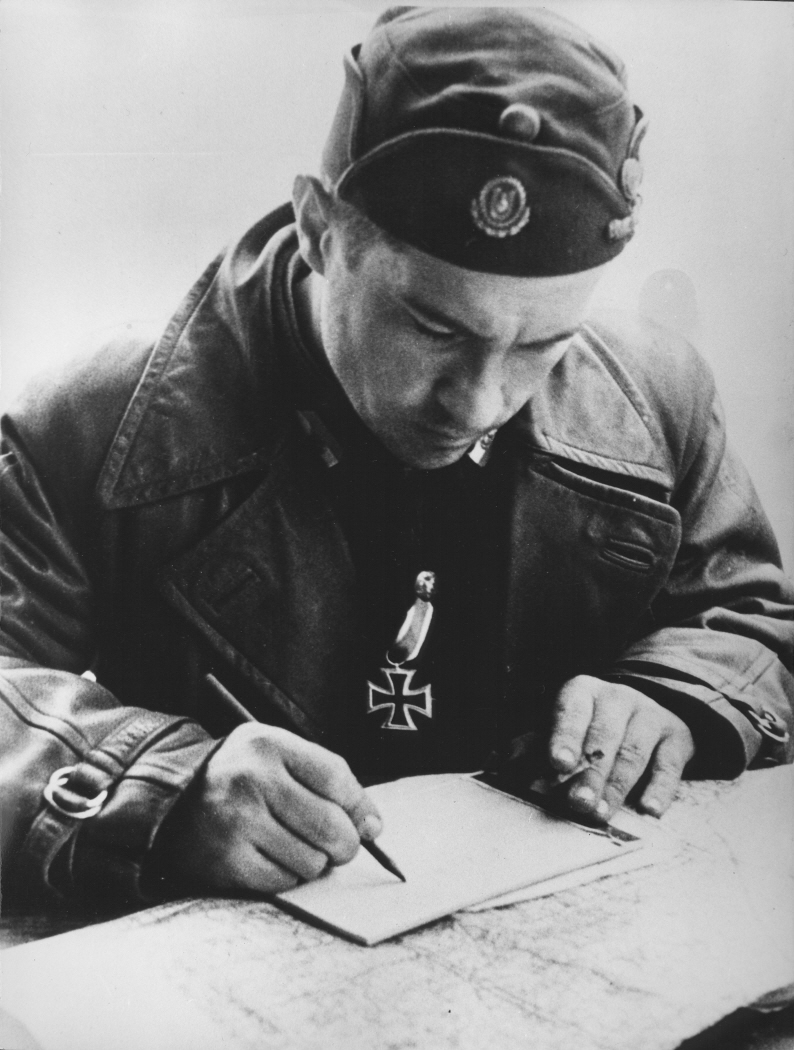
Luburić in the 1940s

The Villa Luburić or Vila Folkert or Colonel Luburić's Centre was the seat of Ustaše headquarters in 1945 Sarajevo, Independent State of Croatia (modern-day Bosnia and Herzegovina). The address of this villa was Skenderija street number 49, owned by Milan Sarić. From February–May 1945, the Ustaše killed at least 323 people in this villa.

== Background ==
In February 1945, Ante Pavelić sent Vjekoslav Luburić to Sarajevo with instructions to destroy the resistance movement. The real task of Luburić was to use the group of monstrous sadists and killers to create atmosphere of fear which would allow Ustaše to retreat from Bosnia and Herzegovina with their forces without casualties and delays.

== House of terror ==
Luburić established his headquarters in the center of Sarajevo. Initially, his headquarter was seated in former Sokolska street (of Mis Irbina's street after the war), but he soon transferred it to villa known as Folkert or Berković in Skenderija street.

Luburić and his forces also used the home of a Croatian family surnamed Babunović as well as a restaurant (Gradski podrum), which, combined, became known as the "House of Terror". He deliberately chose this villa for symbolic reasons, because it was a seat of Sarajevo's Masonic Lodge, leaving the symbol of freemasonry on its facade.

Luburić turned his headquarters into a slaughter house and place for torturing and imprisoning Serbs, Jews and political dissidents.

Immediately after his arrival to Sarajevo, he organized mass arrests. At the end of February 1945 his forces and local police arrested several hundred of people and hunted remaining Jews in Sarajevo. It is estimated that he managed to locate and capture about two hundred Jews. Luburić set up an "emergency court" (Serbo-Croatian: Prijeki Vojni Sud) and organized the execution of hundreds of people. This court organized 13 trials to 85 people, 44 of them sentenced to death and rest of them to long-term prison, but only few survived.

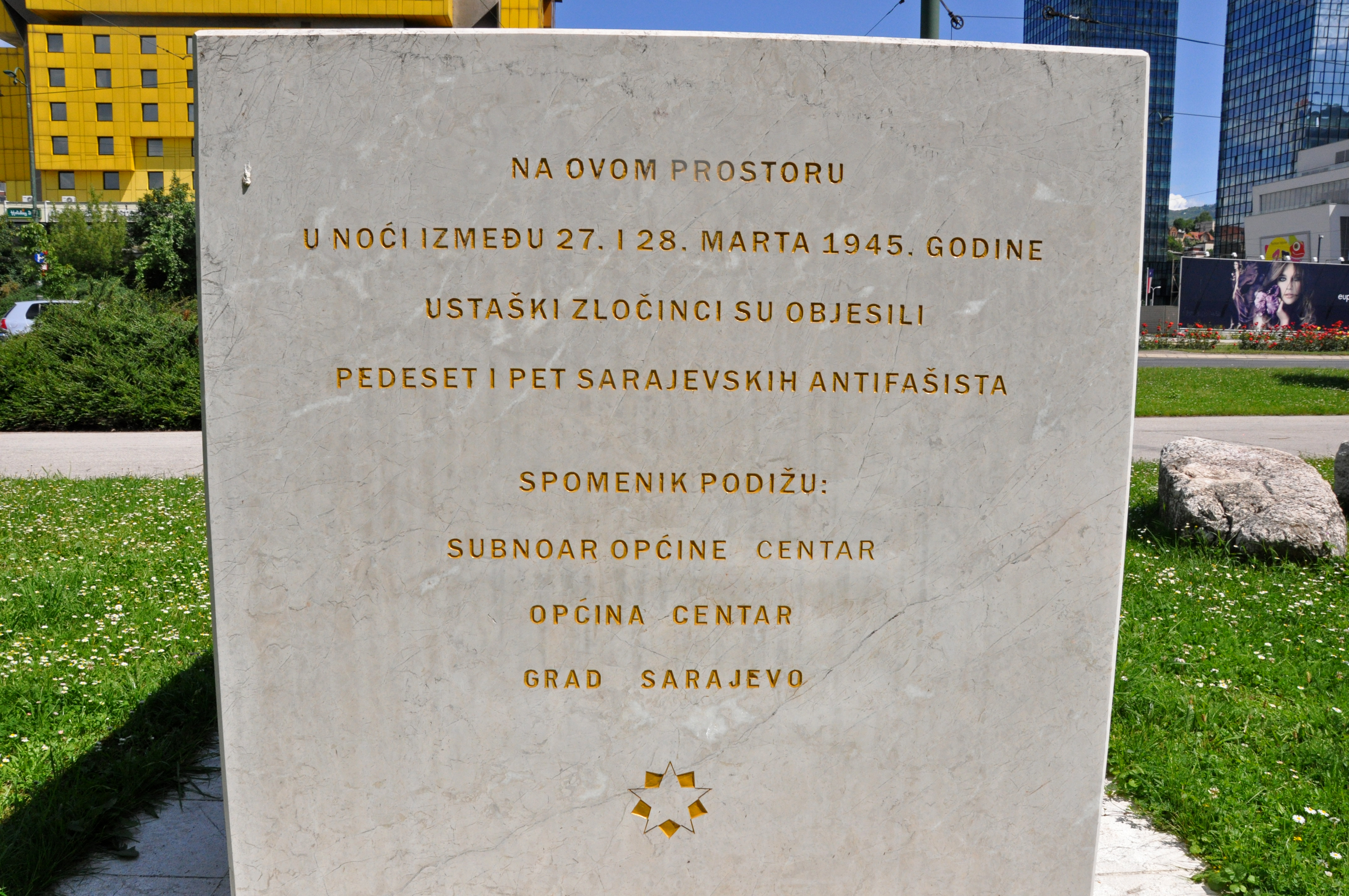
The commemorative plaque on the place of hanging of 55 victims hanged at Marijin Dvor, Sarajevo

In March and beginning of April 1945 his forces killed 323 people and hanged 55 of their corpses on trees in Marijin Dvor to terrify local population. They had placards around their necks with inscription "Long live the Poglavnik". The results of this brutality were witnessed by Landrum Bolling, an American journalist.

...who arrived in the city on April 7 after its liberation by Partizan forces. He was shown a room containing bodies "stacked like cordwood on top of one another. We were told these Serbs whom the Ustashs had hanged by barbed wire from lampposts in Sarajevo ... Luburic's brief reign of terror constituted the Ustasha's final gruesome legacy in Sarajevo. As his last sadistic acts were being carried out, Sarajevo's destiny was being decided on the field of battle in the hills around the city."

== Legacy ==
After the war the premises of former restaurant Gradski podrum were turned into cinema Romanija.

== Sources ==
- Greble, Emily (2011). Sarajevo 1941–1945: Muslims, Christians, and Jews in Hitler's Europe. Cornell University Press. p. 221. ISBN 978-0-8014-6121-7.
- Balic, Emily Greble (2007). A City Apart: Sarajevo in the Second World War. Stanford University.
- Yeomans, Rory (2015). The Utopia of Terror: Life and Death in Wartime Croatia. Boydell & Brewer. ISBN 978-1-58046-545-8.
- Prohić, Kasim; Balić, Sulejman (1976). Sarajevo. Tourist Association.
- Babić, Nikola (1980). Na putevima revolucije: člancí i rasprave. Svjetlost.
- Čekić, Smail (1996). Genocid nad Bošnjacima u Drugom svjetskom ratu: dokumenti. Udruženje Muslimana za antigenocidne aktivnosti.
