= Vjekoslav Luburić =

Croatian Ustaša official (1914–1969)

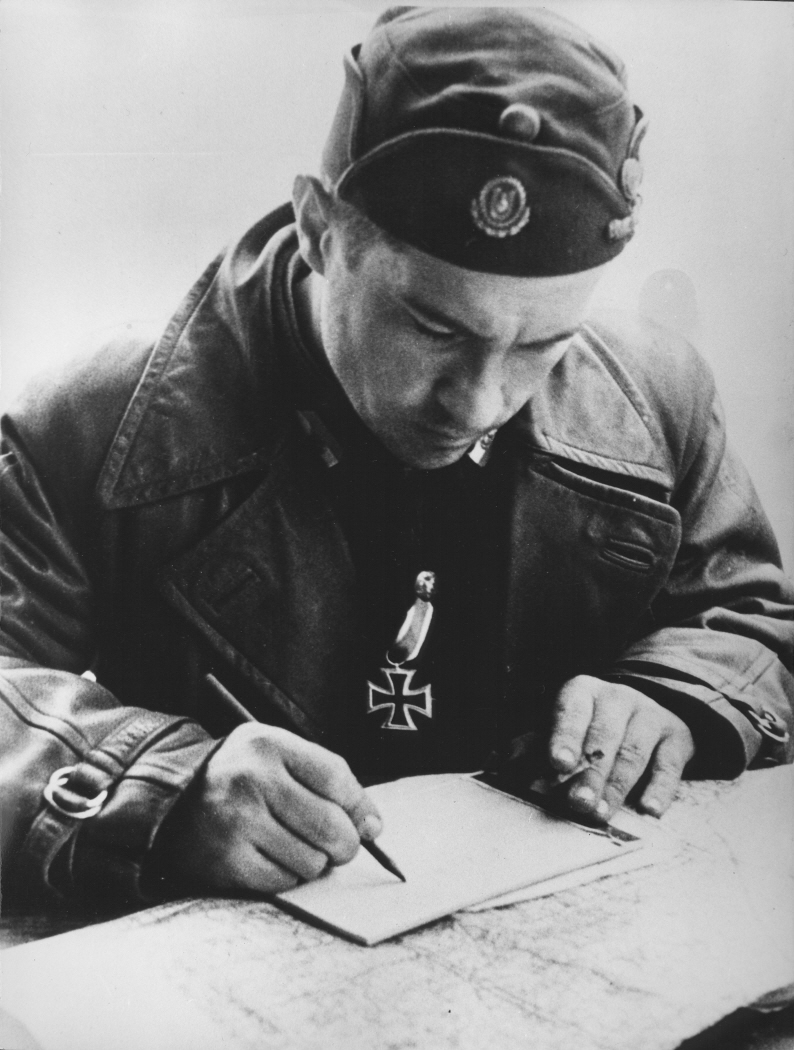
- Luburić in the 1940s
- Born: 6 March 1914; Humac, Condominium of Bosnia and Herzegovina, Austria-Hungary
- Died: 20 April 1969 (aged 55); Carcaixent, Spain
- Spouse: Isabela Hernaiz (m. 1953; div. 1957)
- Children: 5
- Military career
- Allegiance: Independent State of Croatia
- Branch: Ustaše Surveillance Service (1941–1943); Main Directorate for Security and Public Order (1943–1945); Croatian Home Guard (1941–1942); Croatian Armed Forces (1944–1945)
- Service years: 1929–1945
- Rank: General
- Nickname: Maks
- Commands: Ustaše Surveillance Service, Bureau III; 9th Infantry Regiment (Croatian Home Guard); Croatian Armed Forces (May 1945)
- Conflicts: World War II

Vjekoslav Luburić (6 March 1914 – 20 April 1969) was a Croatian Ustaša official who headed the system of concentration camps in the Independent State of Croatia (NDH) during much of World War II. Luburić also personally oversaw and spearheaded the contemporaneous genocides of Serbs, Jews and Roma in the NDH.

Luburić joined Ante Pavelić's Ustaše movement in 1931, left Yugoslavia the following year and relocated to Hungary. Following the Axis invasion of Yugoslavia and the establishment of the NDH with Pavelić at its head, Luburić returned to the Balkans. In late June 1941, Luburić was dispatched to the Lika region, where he oversaw a series of massacres of Serbs, which served as the casus belli for the Srb uprising. Around this time, he was appointed head of Bureau III, a department of the Ustaše Surveillance Service tasked with overseeing the NDH's sprawling network of concentration camps. The largest of these was Jasenovac, where approximately 100,000 people were killed over the course of the war. In late 1942, Luburić was appointed commander of the Croatian Home Guard's 9th Infantry Regiment but was stripped of his command after shooting and killing one of his subordinates. Under German pressure, he was placed under house arrest, but retained de facto control of the Ustaše concentration camps. In August 1944, he played a leading role in the disruption of the Lorković–Vokić plot, which sought to overthrow Pavelić and replace him with a pro-Allied government. In February 1945, Pavelić dispatched Luburić to Sarajevo, where over the next two months, he oversaw the torture and killing of hundreds of known and suspected communists. Luburić flew back to Zagreb in early April and was promoted to the rank of general.

The NDH collapsed in May 1945 and its territory was reintegrated into Yugoslavia. Luburić stayed behind to conduct a guerrilla warfare campaign against the communists, during which he was seriously wounded. In 1949, he emigrated to Spain and became active in Ustaše émigré circles. In 1955, Luburić broke with Pavelić over the latter's professed support for a future division of Bosnia and Herzegovina between Greater Croatia and Greater Serbia, and formed a rival Croatian nationalist organization known as the Croatian National Resistance. The disagreement resulted in great acrimony between the two men and, when Pavelić died in 1959, Luburić was forbidden from attending his funeral. In April 1969, Luburić was found murdered in his home, a victim of either the Yugoslav secret police or rivals in the Croatian émigré community.

== Early life ==
Vjekoslav Luburić was born into a Herzegovinian Croat family in the village of Humac, near Ljubuški, on 6 March 1914. He was the third child of Ljubomir Luburić, a bank clerk, and Marija Soldo, a homemaker. The couple had another son, Dragutin, and two daughters, Mira and Olga. Luburić was a devout and practising Roman Catholic. In December 1918, his father was shot by a police officer while smuggling tobacco and died of blood loss. (Note: Some sources contend that Ljubomir Luburić died in police custody after being immersed in freezing water and left overnight in an unheated prison cell.) Following his father's death, Luburić came to "detest and resent Serbs and the Serbian monarchy", the historian Cathie Carmichael writes. Shortly thereafter, Luburić's sister Olga committed suicide by jumping into the Trebižat River after their mother forbade her from marrying a Muslim. Following the deaths of Luburić's father and sister, his mother found work in a tobacco factory to provide for her remaining children. She soon married a man named Jozo Tambić, with whom she had three more children. Luburić's half-siblings, born of his mother's second marriage, were named Zora, Nada and Tomislav.

Luburić completed his primary education in Ljubuški, before relocating to Mostar to attend secondary school. There, he began associating with Croatian nationalist youths. He became increasingly aggressive towards his teachers and peers, and often truanted. Luburić’s first encounter with law enforcement occurred on 7 September 1929, when he was arrested for vagrancy and sentenced to two days’ imprisonment by a Mostar court. In his senior year, Luburić dropped out of high school to work in the Mostar public stock exchange. In 1931, he joined the Ustaše, a Croatian fascist and ultra-nationalist movement committed to the destruction of Yugoslavia and the establishment of Greater Croatia. The same year, he was arrested for the embezzlement of funds belonging to the exchange. On 5 December, Luburić was sentenced to five months in prison for embezzlement. Shortly thereafter, he escaped captivity and made it as far as the Albanian–Yugoslav border before being recaptured. Upon release, Luburić relocated to northern Croatia, and then to Subotica, where he surreptitiously crossed the Hungarian–Yugoslav border. Luburić first rendezvoused with the Croatian émigré community in Budapest before relocating to an Ustaše training camp called Janka-Puszta. Situated close to the Yugoslav frontier, Janka-Puszta was one of several Ustaše training camps established in Hungary and Italy, whose governments were sympathetic to the Ustaše cause and had territorial aspirations in Yugoslavia. It housed several hundred Croat émigrés, mostly manual labourers returning from Western Europe and North America. The recruits swore an oath of loyalty to the leader of the Ustaše, Ante Pavelić, took part in pseudo-military exercises, and produced anti-Serb propaganda material. It was at Janka-Puszta that Luburić earned the nickname Maks, which he was to use for the remainder of his life.

In October 1934, King Alexander of Yugoslavia was assassinated while on a diplomatic visit to Marseille, in a joint conspiracy between the Internal Macedonian Revolutionary Organization and the Ustaše. Following the assassination, most of the Ustaše residing in Hungary were evicted by the country's government, with the exception of Luburić and several others. For a short time, Luburić resided in Nagykanizsa, where, after a brief love affair, a local woman bore him a son.

== World War II ==
=== Creation of the NDH ===
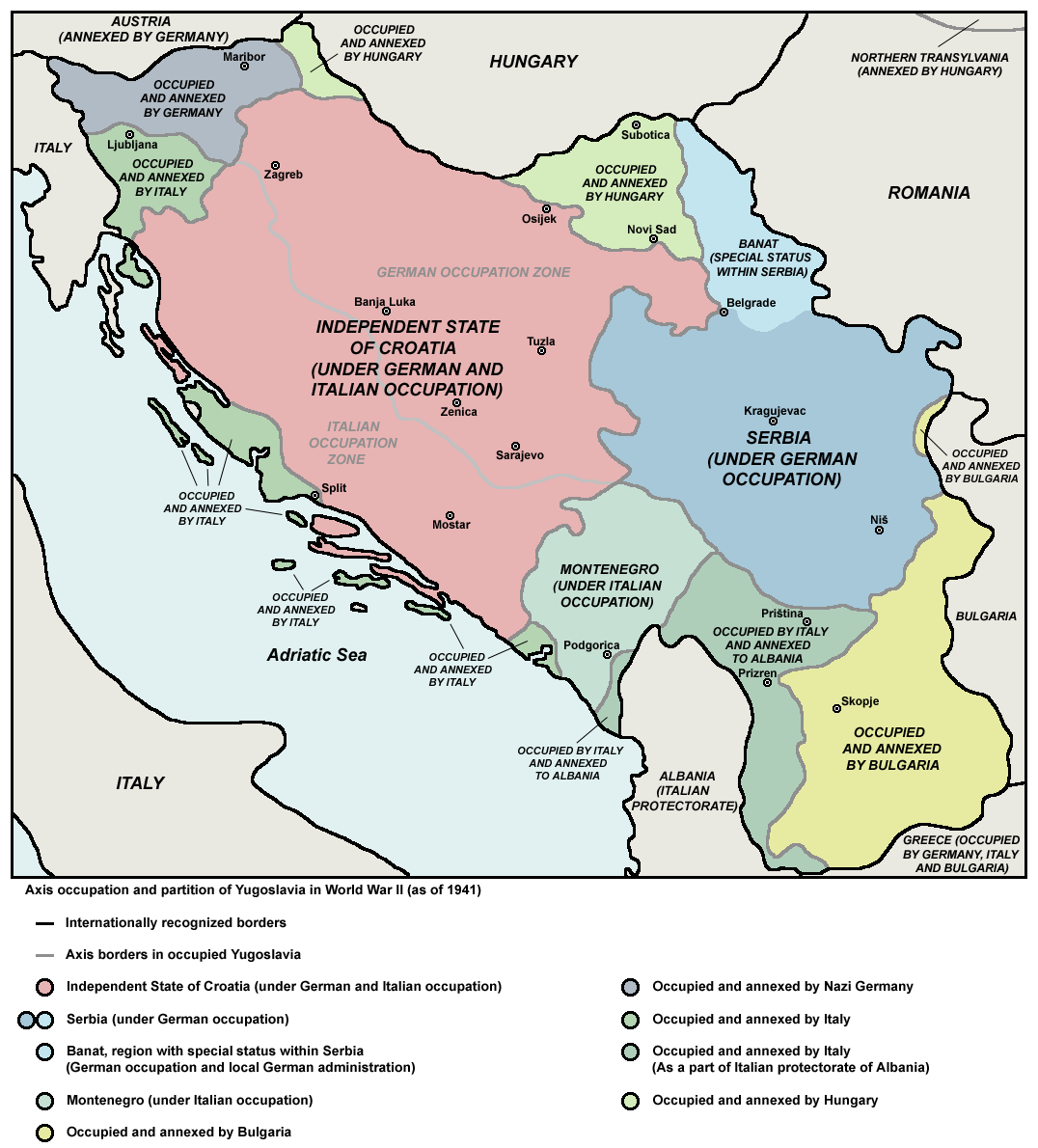
Map of the partition of Yugoslavia, 1941–1943

Following the 1938 Anschluss between Germany and Austria, Yugoslavia came to share its northwestern border with the Third Reich and fell under increasing pressure as its neighbours aligned themselves with the Axis powers. In April 1939, Italy opened a second frontier with Yugoslavia when it invaded and occupied neighbouring Albania. Following the outbreak of World War II, the Yugoslav government declared its neutrality. Between September and November 1940, Hungary and Romania joined the Tripartite Pact, aligning themselves with the Axis, and Italy invaded Greece. Yugoslavia was by then almost completely surrounded by the Axis powers and their satellites, and its neutral stance toward the war became strained. In late February 1941, Bulgaria joined the Pact. The following day, German troops entered Bulgaria from Romania, closing the ring around Yugoslavia. Intending to secure his southern flank for the impending attack on the Soviet Union, German dictator Adolf Hitler began placing heavy pressure on Yugoslavia to join the Axis. On 25 March 1941, after some delay, the Yugoslav government conditionally signed the Pact. Two days later, a group of pro-Western, Serbian nationalist Royal Yugoslav Air Force officers deposed the country's regent, Prince Paul, in a bloodless coup d'état. They placed his teenage nephew Peter on the throne and brought to power a "government of national unity" led by the head of the Royal Yugoslav Air Force, General Dušan Simović. The coup enraged Hitler, who immediately ordered the country's invasion, which commenced on 6 April 1941.

On 10 April, the creation of the Independent State of Croatia (Croatian: Nezavisna Država Hrvatska; NDH) was announced over the radio by Slavko Kvaternik, a former Austro-Hungarian Army officer who had been in contact with Croatian nationalists abroad. Pavelić arrived in Zagreb on 15 April and proclaimed himself leader (Croatian: Poglavnik) of the NDH, having assured the Germans that the NDH would be loyal to the Axis cause. Disenchanted with more than twenty years of Serb hegemony, the majority of Croats enthusiastically welcomed the NDH's creation. The Axis invasion of Yugoslavia had transformed the Ustaše from a small and relatively obscure Croatian nationalist organization into a popular movement almost overnight. (Note: The Ustaše likely did not have more than 12,000 members before 1941. In comparison, the Communist Party of Yugoslavia had about 6,000 members in 1940.) The Germans initially wanted to install Croatian Peasant Party leader Vladko Maček as the head of the Croatian puppet state, but Maček refused, citing his democratic convictions and his firm belief that the Axis powers would not win the war. The NDH was divided into German and Italian areas of influence. The Italian area of influence was divided into three operational zones. Zone I, which consisted of the coastal and island area surrounding the cities of Zadar, Šibenik, Trogir and Split, was directly annexed by Italy. Zone II was consigned to the NDH. It encompassed much of Dalmatia and the Dalmatian Hinterland. Zone III, also allotted to the NDH, extended as far as western and central Bosnia, a sliver of eastern Bosnia, and all of Herzegovina.

On 17 April, the Ustaše instituted the Legal Provision for the Defence of the People and State, a law legitimizing the establishment of concentration camps and the mass shooting of hostages across the NDH. The Jewish Question was only of secondary concern to the Ustaše. Their foremost goal was to rid the NDH of its 1.9 million Serbs, who made up about 30% of the fledgling puppet state's total population. Senior Ustaše officials openly stated that they sought to kill one-third of Serbs living in the NDH, expel one-third and convert one-third to Roman Catholicism. The Ustaše movement's grievances centred around the perceived injustices inflicted upon the Croats in Serb-dominated Yugoslavia during the interwar period. Senior Ustaše officials cited the shooting of five Croatian parliamentary deputies in June 1928, the murder of the Croatian nationalist anthropologist and historian Milan Šufflay in 1931, the suppression of the Velebit uprising in 1932, the murder of the Croatian Peasant Party vice-president Josip Predavec in 1933, and the arrest and incarceration of dozens of other Croatian political figures.

=== Initial cleansing operations ===
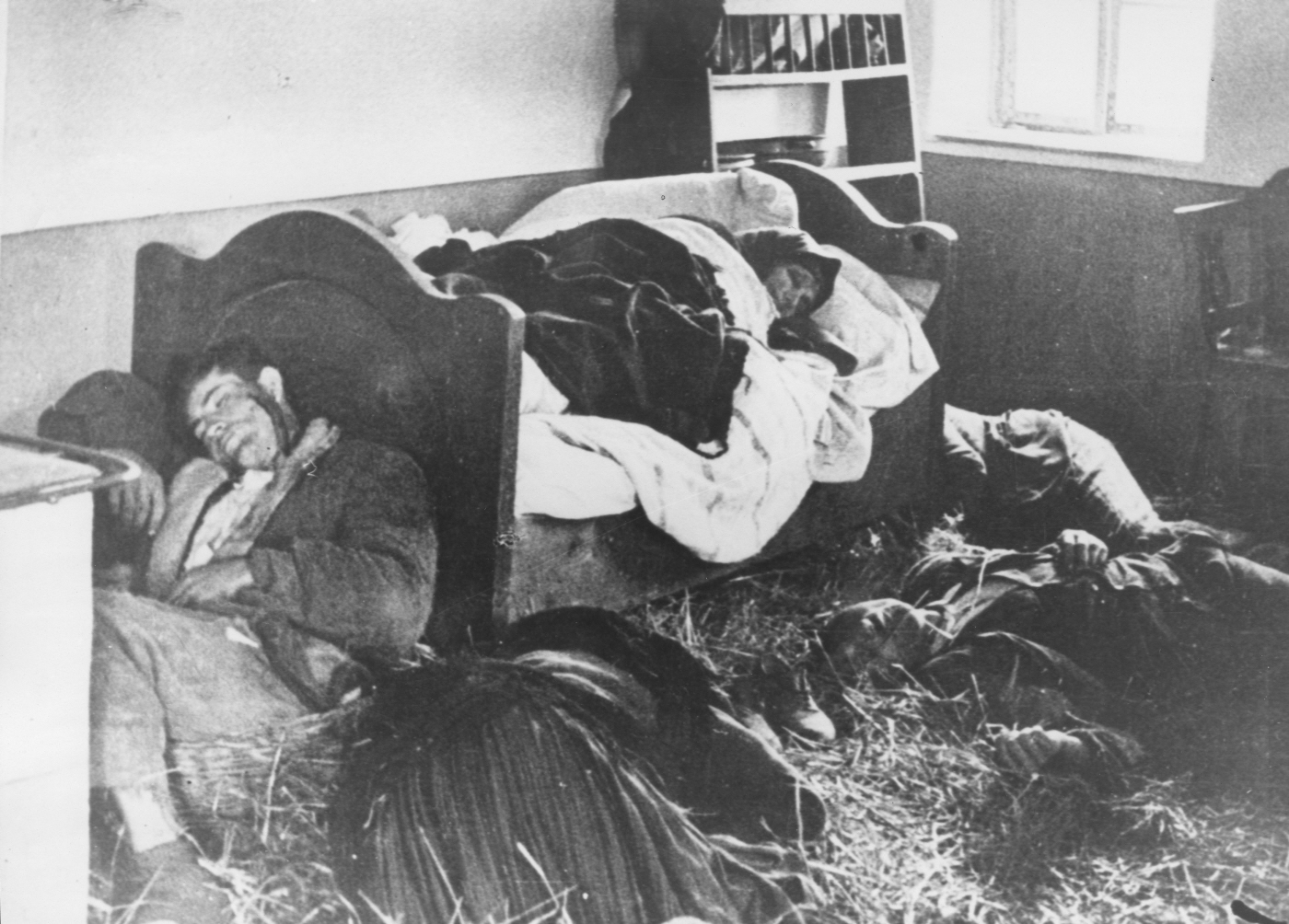
A Serb family killed in their home by the Ustaše, 1941

In early April 1941, Luburić had illegally crossed the Yugoslav border near the town of Gola. By mid-April, he arrived in Zagreb and was appointed to the Economic Bureau of the Main Ustaša Headquarters (Croatian: Glavni ustaški stan; GUS), the Ustaše ruling body, serving as an adjutant to Vjekoslav Servatzy. On 6 May, Luburić was dispatched to the village of Veljun, near Slunj, to lead the round-up of 400 Serb men from the village in retaliation for the murder of a Croat family in neighbouring Blagaj the night before. Although the identity of the perpetrators remained a mystery, the Ustaše announced that the Serbs of Veljun were responsible and decided that the village's male inhabitants were to be collectively punished. Luburić had a total of fifty men at his disposal, many of them longtime Ustaše who had lived in exile in Italy in the 1930s. On the evening of 9 May, the Serb men and boys of Veljun were brought to Blagaj, and killed with knives and blunt objects in the backyard of a local elementary school. The murders lasted all night. The following morning, Luburić was seen emerging from the school covered in blood, washing his hands and sleeves by a water well.

In late June, Ustaše officials driving through the villages of Gornja Suvaja and Donja Suvaja, in the Lika region, reported being shot at, prompting the regional authorities to order a "cleansing" action against the villages. On the morning of 1 July, Luburić led a group of Ustaše into the two villages. The historian Max Bergholz writes that up to 300 Ustaše took part in the operation. According to the journalist and Holocaust survivor Slavko Goldstein, Luburić had about 150 members of the Ustaše Auxiliary Force at his disposal, in addition to 250 members of the Croatian Home Guard. Many of Gornja Suvaja and Donja Suvaja's male inhabitants had fled into the wilderness before the Ustaše arrived. Their female relatives stayed behind and were subjected to rape and sexual mutilation. The massacre lasted about two hours; the Ustaše relied primarily on knives and clubs to kill their victims. At least 173 villagers were killed, mostly women, children and the elderly.

On 2 July, 130–150 Ustaše attacked the nearby village of Osredci. Most of the village's inhabitants had fled in anticipation of a massacre, having heard of what happened in Gornja Suvaja and Donja Suvaja the day before. Over the course of the following two days, the Ustaše massacred about thirty of the village's inhabitants, mostly the elderly and infirm, who had been unable to flee along with the others. Concurrently, Luburić and his followers massacred the inhabitants of the nearby village of Bubanj. According to their own internal documents, the Ustaše killed 152 Serb civilians in Bubanj and burned down twenty homes. In some households, not a single person was left alive. Survivor accounts suggest that the number of fatalities was about 270. On 3 July, one of Luburić's units detained 53 inhabitants of the village of Nebljusi, including ten children under the age of 12. They were transported by horse-drawn cart to the nearby village of Boričevac, which contained a barracks and a karst pit. The residents of Nebljusi were detained inside the barracks until nightfall, alongside twelve adult males who had been arrested earlier. That evening, they were marched to the karst pit in groups of eight and pushed inside to their deaths. Two of the victims managed to survive the ordeal. By the end of July, the Ustaše had killed at least 1,800 Serbs in and around Lika.

The Ustaše atrocities against the NDH's Serb population prompted thousands of Serbs to join Josip Broz Tito's Partisans and Draža Mihailović's Chetniks. (Note: The communist-led, multi-ethnic Partisans and the royalist, Serbian nationalist Chetniks were the two primary resistance movements in occupied Yugoslavia. Tito was the General Secretary of the Communist Party of Yugoslavia, whereas Mihailović had been an officer in the interwar Royal Yugoslav Army. The two movements had widely divergent goals. Whereas the Partisans sought to turn Yugoslavia into a communist state under Tito's leadership, the Chetniks sought a return to the pre-war status quo.) The Lika massacres in particular served as the casus belli for the Srb uprising, which commenced on 27 July. The revolt led to the Italian military occupations of Zone II and Zone III. "Luburić and his superiors had wrongly calculated that the brutal killings of an innocent population would quash any embryonic resistance to their plan for the creation of an 'ethnically pure area'," Goldstein remarked. "Their actions ... provoked the completely opposite effect." In mid-July 1941, Luburić was tasked with recapturing dozens of inmates who had escaped from the Kerestinec camp. Almost all the fugitives were captured or killed, and several Ustaše also lost their lives.

=== Ustaše Surveillance Service, Bureau III ===
==== Jasenovac, I–III ====
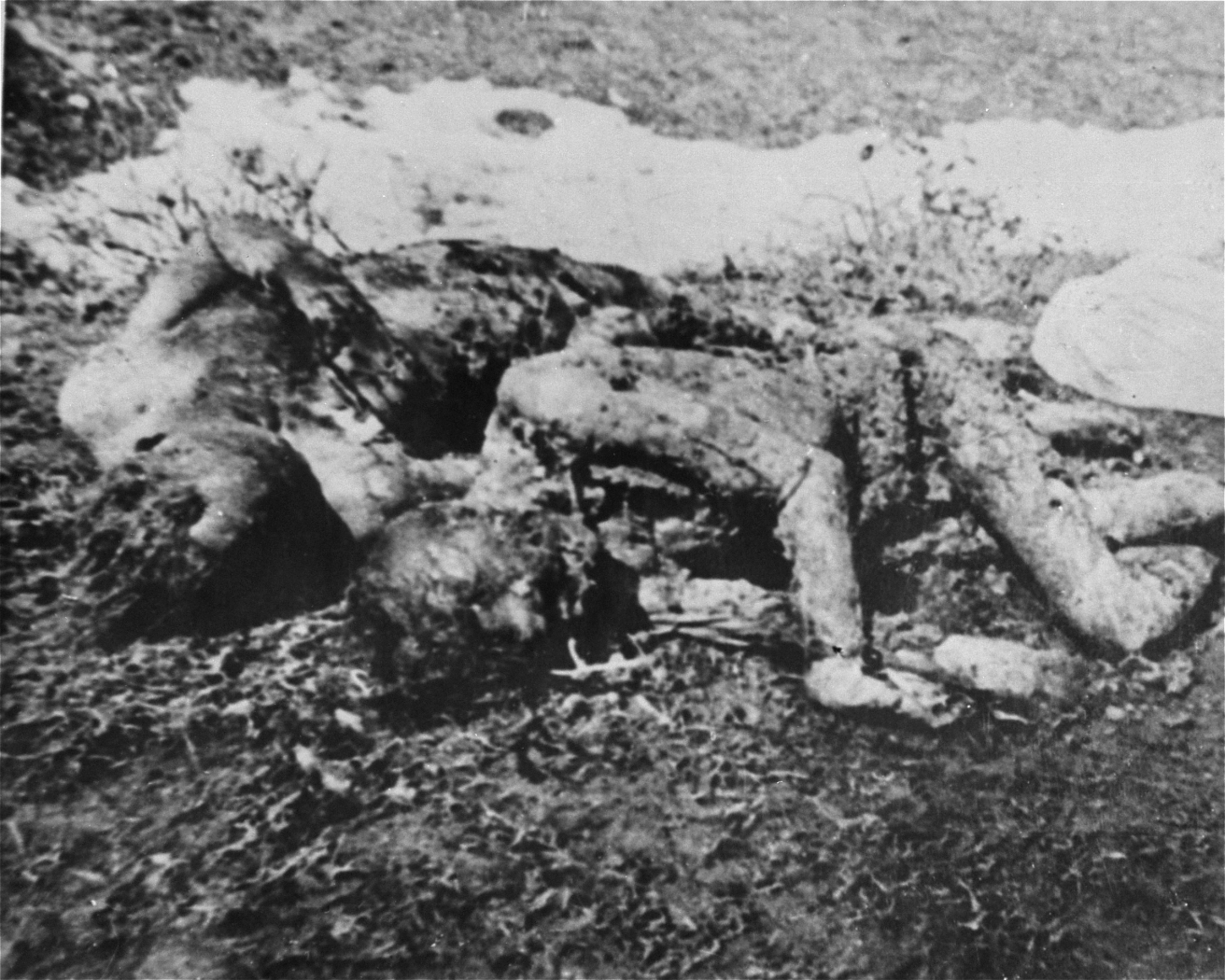
The decaying corpses of a pair of Jasenovac victims.

The NDH's security sector was made up of two agencies, the Directorate for Security and Public Order (Croatian: Ravnateljstvo za javni red i sigurnost; RAVSIGUR) and the Ustaše Surveillance Service (Croatian: Ustaška nadzorna služba; UNS). Both the RAVSIGUR and the UNS were led by Kvaternik's son, Dido. The RAVSIGUR was established on 4 May 1941. The UNS was established in August. (Note: According to some accounts, Luburić was appointed to lead Bureau III following the death of its former head, Mijo Babić, indicating that the UNS was created before August 1941. Babić had been killed while battling Chetniks in the vicinity of Berkovići on 3 July 1941.) (Note: According to Tomasevich, the UNS was established on 16 August 1941. The historian Nataša Mataušić writes that the UNS was established on 23 August.) The latter was divided into three bureaus: Bureau I, Bureau III and Bureau IV. Bureau III, also known as the Ustaše Defense, was tasked with administering the NDH's concentration camps. There were about 30 in total stretching across the NDH. From April to August 1941, the RAVSIGUR was responsible for the camps' administration. For much of the war, Bureau III was headed by Luburić. According to Siegfried Kasche, the German ambassador to the NDH, Luburić had envisaged creating a network of concentration camps during his time in exile.

In May 1941, Kvaternik had ordered the construction of two detention centres in the villages of Krapje (Jasenovac I) and Bročice (Jasenovac II), the first two sub-camps of what was to become the Jasenovac concentration camp. Krapje and Bročice opened on 23 August. The same day, faced with the Italian military occupation of Zone II, Bureau III ordered the dissolution of all concentration camps situated in the NDH's coastal areas. In the first months of the Jasenovac concentration camp system's operation, Luburić rarely ordered mass executions without the consent of his superiors. Ante Moškov, a leading Ustaše official, remarked: "He was more fond of the Poglavnik than he was even of his own mother and brothers, and loyalty and obedience to him was the meaning of his life." Luburić's loyalty and dedication eventually paid off, and as the war progressed, he became a trusted member of Pavelić's inner circle. (Note: A member of Pavelić's inner circle was called a ras. The term was derived from the Italian fascist title ras, meaning "boss".) In late September 1941, the government of the NDH dispatched Luburić to the Third Reich to study German methods of creating and maintaining concentration camps. Luburić's tour of the camps lasted ten days. Subsequent Ustaše camps were modelled on Oranienburg and Sachsenhausen. (Note: The Ustaše replicated German approaches to prisoner arrival, registration, housing, roll calls, and forced labour. They based the inmates' colour codes on those devised by the German Concentration Camps Inspectorate (German: Inspektion der Konzentrationslager; IDL). The Ustaše also appointed foremen and deputies from among the prisoners, roughly equivalent to the kapos in German concentration camps, to manage camp life.) The Jasenovac camp system was situated in a heavily Serb-populated area. On Luburić's orders, between September and October 1941, all Serb villages in the vicinity of the two sub-camps were razed, their inhabitants rounded up and deported to Krapje and Bročice. Between 14 and 16 November 1941, Krapje and Bročice were dissolved. Able-bodied prisoners were forced to construct a third sub-camp, Jasenovac III, which came to be known as the Brickyard (Croatian: Ciglana). The sick and infirm were either killed or left to die in the abandoned campgrounds. Of the 3,000–4,000 prisoners detained in Krapje and Bročice at the time of their dissolution, only 1,500 lived to see the Brickyard.

==== Jasenovac, IV–V ====
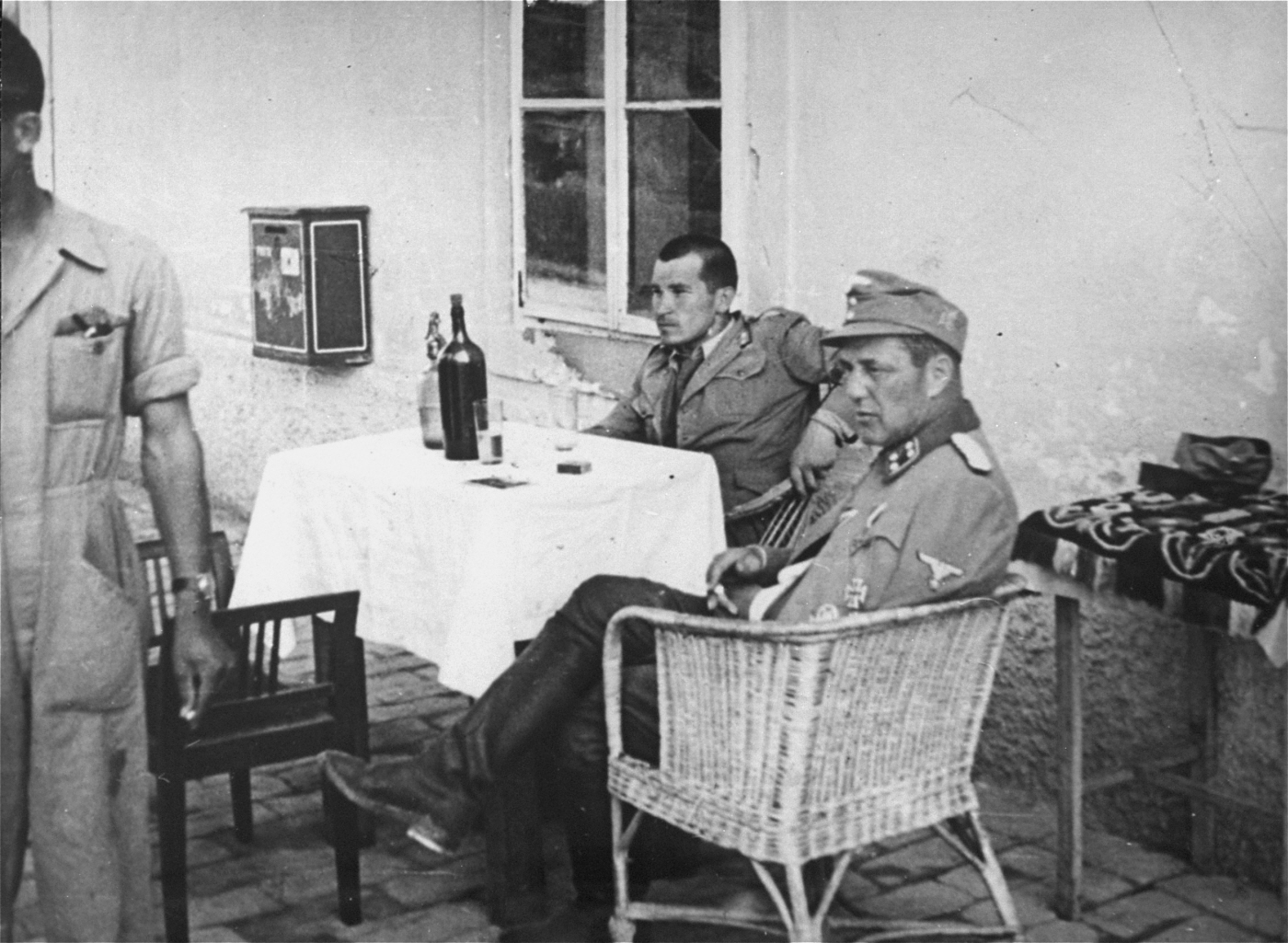
Luburić sitting with a German officer at Stara Gradiška, June 1942

Armed with the information he had gathered in Germany, Luburić was able to organize the Brickyard more efficiently than Krapje and Bročice had been. In January 1942, Bureau III ordered the establishment of Jasenovac IV, a sub-camp dedicated to leather production, which became known as the Tannery (Croatian: Kožara). A fifth and final sub-camp, Jasenovac V, was established around the same time. Known as Stara Gradiška, after the village in which it was located, it was overseen by both male and female guards. Among them were Luburić's half-sisters, Nada and Zora. The former participated extensively in the tortures and executions that took place at Stara Gradiška. She went on to marry Dinko Šakić. During the war, Šakić served as the deputy commander of Stara Gradiška, and later, as the commander of the Brickyard. Luburić also recruited his cousin Ljubo Miloš. Miloš served as the labour service commandant at the Brickyard. Like Luburić, who was in his late twenties when he was appointed head of Bureau III, most of the Ustaše tasked with administering the Jasenovac camp system were extremely young. Šakić was 20 in 1941 and Miloš was 22.

The Jasenovac camp system was guarded by more than 1,500 Ustaše. The Brickyard, the Tannery and Stara Gradiška were capable of holding 7,000 inmates, although the number of inmates never exceeded 4,000 at any given time. Luburić visited the Jasenovac camp system two or three times per month. He insisted on personally killing at least one inmate on each of his visits. Luburić enjoyed taunting prisoners as to the date and method of their execution. He would "amuse himself by placing his revolver up against the heads of the prisoners," the Tito biographer Jasper Ridley writes. "Sometimes he pulled the trigger; sometimes he did not." Luburić's cruelty also extended to the other Ustaše camps. In one instance, he deliberately dispatched hundreds of typhus-ridden inmates from Stara Gradiška to Đakovo so as to expedite the spread of the disease among its prisoners. "Luburić created such an atmosphere," Miloš recalled, "that every Ustaša actually felt himself called upon to kill a prisoner, believing that this would be an act of patriotism." (Note: Luburić distributed gold and silver medals to the most efficient Ustaše killers. He sought to expedite the pace of the killings by encouraging competition among the camp guards. In August 1942, a guard named Petar Brzica killed 1,360 inmates over the course of a single night. Brzica was rewarded with a gold watch, a bottle of wine, and a suckling pig. Excess drinking and alcoholism were widespread among the camp personnel.) After unsuccessfully experimenting with gas vans, Luburić ordered that a gas chamber be constructed at Stara Gradiška, which used a combination of sulfur dioxide and Zyklon B. The gas chamber was poorly constructed and this method of killing was abandoned after three months. Over the course of the war, unlike in the German camps, most inmates were killed with knives or blunt objects.

In early 1942, conditions at Jasenovac improved somewhat in anticipation of a visit by a Red Cross delegation. Healthier inmates, who were provided with new beds and bedclothes, were allowed to speak to the delegation, while sick and emaciated ones were killed. After the delegation left, camp conditions reverted to their prior state. Whenever he was pressed for information by the families of those detained at Jasenovac, Luburić remained equivocal. When a Croatian Jewish civil servant named Dragutin Rosenberg attempted to persuade him to allow food and clothing to be delivered to Jasenovac on a name-by-name basis, Luburić only agreed to bulk consignments, so as not to reveal which detainees were still alive. Luburić also proved impervious to bribes, as exemplified by the case of Julius Schmidlin, a Red Cross representative, who attempted to bribe Luburić into treating the inmates at Jasenovac more humanely but was angrily rebuffed. In addition, Luburić did not tolerate the mishandling of goods seized from camp inmates, as exemplified by his response to the so-called Gold Affair, in which camp guards were caught attempting to smuggle confiscated jewellery out of Jasenovac. Luburić ordered that the culprits be killed. Among those killed was the brother of Luburić's deputy Ivica Matković, who was beaten to death.

=== Kozara Offensive ===
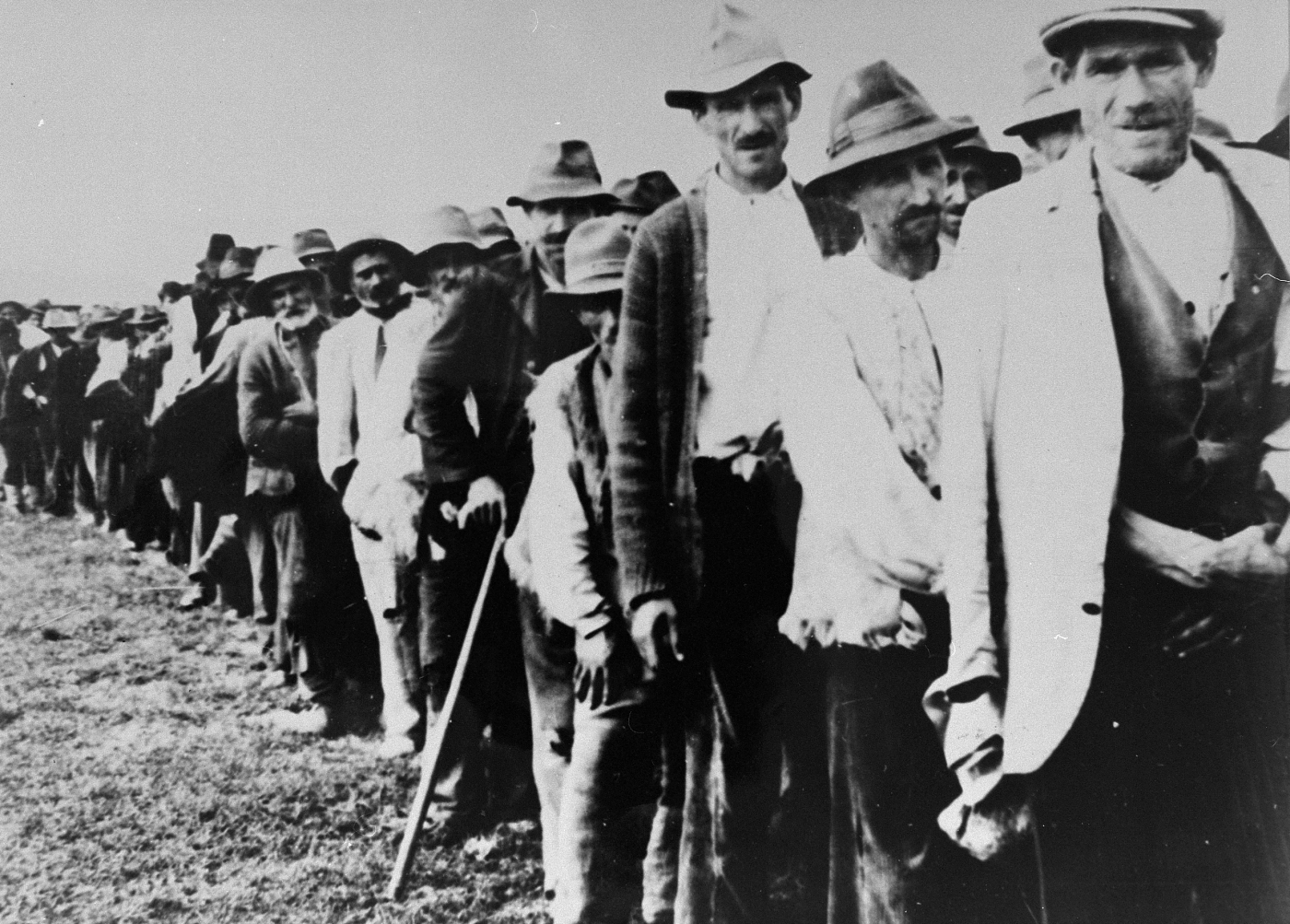
The deportation of Serbs and Roma from Kozara

On 21 December 1941, Ustaše units under the command of Luburić, Rukavina and Moškov marched into Prkosi, near Bosanski Petrovac. Luburić declared: "We have to kill everyone, in Prkos [sic] and in all of their villages, to the last man, even children." The Ustaše proceeded to round up more than 400 Serb civilians, mostly women, children and the elderly. Shortly thereafter, they were led to a nearby forest and killed. On 14 January 1942, Luburić led a group of Ustaše into the village of Draksenić, in northern Bosnia, and ordered the killing of its inhabitants. More than 200 villagers were killed in the ensuing massacre, mostly women, children and the elderly. In mid-1942, the State Intelligence and Propaganda Bureau (Croatian: Državni izvještajni i promičbeni ured; DIPU) issued a stern warning to all newspapers in the NDH, forbidding them from reporting on Luburić, Bureau III and the NDH's so-called "collection centers". Despite the DIPU's warning, Luburić was featured in a 1942 propaganda short film titled Guard on the Drina (Croatian: Straža na Drini, German: Wacht an der Drina).

In June 1942, the Wehrmacht, Home Guard and Ustaše Militia launched the Kozara Offensive, aimed at dislodging Partisan formations around Mount Kozara, in northwestern Bosnia, which threatened Germany's access to the Belgrade–Zagreb railway line. Although the Partisans did suffer a humiliating defeat, the area's civilian population bore the brunt of the offensive. Between 10 June and 30 July 1942, 60,000 civilians living in the vicinity of Mount Kozara, mostly Serbs, were rounded up and taken to concentration camps. "Kozara was cleared to the last man," Wehrmacht Plenipotentiary General Edmund Glaise-Horstenau wrote, "and likewise, the last woman and last child."

Following Kozara's depopulation, Luburić envisaged creating an annual "tax", whereby Serb boys would be taken from their families, conditioned to renounce their Serb national identity, and inducted into the Ustaše fold. In late 1942, he "adopted" 450 boys who had been displaced during the fighting around Mount Kozara. Dressed in black Ustaše robes, Luburić dubbed the boys his "little janissaries", an allusion to the Ottoman Empire's devşirme system, which saw tens of thousands of boys taken from Christian families across the Balkans and inducted into the Ottoman military. Each morning, Luburić's "janissaries" were forced to take part in military drills and say the Lord's Prayer. The experiment failed and the majority of the boys refused to become Ustaše. Most subsequently died of malnutrition, dysentery and other diseases. Hundreds of other children abducted by the Ustaše in the aftermath of the Kozara Offensive were saved by a group of Red Cross volunteers from Zagreb, led by Diana Budisavljević. In her diary, Budisavljević recalled an encounter she had with Luburić at Stara Gradiška, in which the latter chastised her and her colleagues for "caring only about Serb children", while there were Croat and Bosnian Muslim children across the NDH who were suffering as well. According to Budisavljević, Luburić threatened to have her and her colleagues detained, ominously warning that, "no one would know what had happened to them or their whereabouts."

=== House arrest and disruption of the Lorković–Vokić plot ===
In August 1942, Luburić was promoted to the rank of Bojnik (Major). Glaise-Horstenau complained to Pavelić that Luburić was interfering with German operations. The Germans distrusted Luburić, with one of their internal memorandums describing him as "a neurotic, pathological personality". Seeking to appease the Germans, Pavelić reassigned Luburić to Travnik. He appointed him commander of the Croatian Home Guard's 9th Infantry Regiment (Croatian: Deveta pješačka pukovnija), whose purpose would be to secure the NDH's border with Italian-occupied Montenegro in East Herzegovina, which had a heavy Chetnik presence.

As the 9th Infantry Regiment was preparing to leave for Herzegovina, Luburić shot and killed one of the Home Guards under his command. (Note: Several conflicting accounts exist as to why Luburić killed the Home Guard. According to contemporary documents, Luburić accused the Home Guard of sedition. The historian Nikica Barić states that Luburić killed him unprovoked.) The killing sparked an outcry among the Home Guards. Luburić was immediately stripped of his command, which went to Colonel Franjo Šimić. In late November, at the urging of the Germans, Luburić was placed under house arrest, which he spent in a Zagreb apartment together with his mother and half-sisters. Stanko Šarc was appointed to oversee operations at Jasenovac in Luburić's absence. Luburić's deputy Ivica Matković was replaced by Ivica Brkljačić. The terms of Luburić's house arrest were very lenient and he was allowed to leave his apartment for strolls. Luburić exercised de facto control over the operations at Jasenovac, despite his officially having been replaced. For example, in late 1942, he arranged for the release of Miroslav Filipović, who had been jailed for committing a series of atrocities against the Serb population of northern Bosnia. Filipović was subsequently appointed commander of Stara Gradiška. For a period of two months, Maček and his wife lived alongside Luburić and his family. According to Maček, Luburić's mother tearfully told Maček's wife that she would regret having given birth to Luburić if her son had been responsible for the atrocities that he was rumoured to have committed.

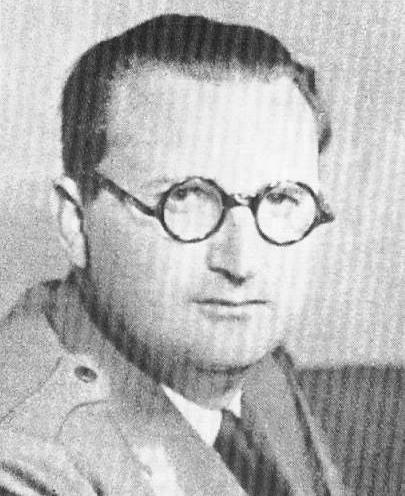
Mladen Lorković, Minister of the Interior

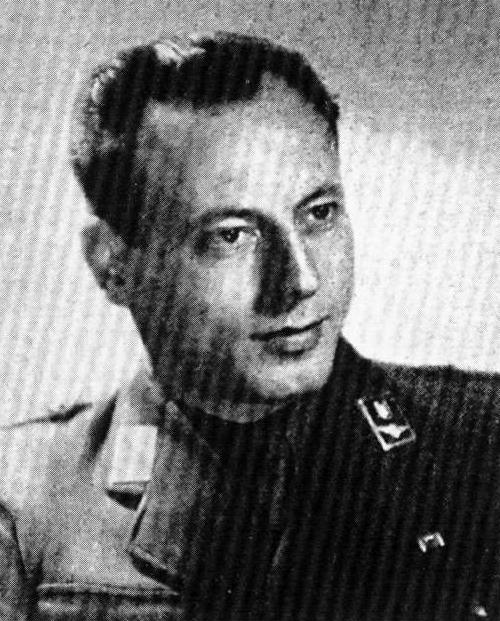
Ante Vokić, Minister of Defense

By late 1942, the growing unrest in the NDH was beginning to harm German interests in Southeast Europe. The Germans began placing pressure on Pavelić to bring stability to the NDH. To this end, they encouraged him to halt the Ustaše atrocities against the Serbs. In response, the Ustaše established the so-called Croatian Orthodox Church, whose purpose was to assimilate the NDH's Serb population, designating them as "Croats of the Orthodox faith". Pavelić singled out Slavko and Dido Kvaternik as scapegoats for all the NDH's troubles. He blamed the former for the Home Guard and Ustaše Militia's inability to bring the Partisans and Chetniks to heel, and the latter for the massacres of Serbs, even though the atrocities had been committed with Pavelić's knowledge. In October 1942, the father-and-son duo were exiled to Slovakia. On 21 January 1943, the UNS was dissolved and amalgamated into the Main Directorate for Security and Public Order (Croatian: Glavno ravnateljstvo za javni red i sigurnost; GRAVSIGUR), which had been established to replace the RAVSIGUR earlier that month. The GRAVSIGUR then assumed responsibility for the administration of the NDH's concentration camps.

Still officially under house arrest, Luburić relocated to the village of Šumec, near Lepoglava, in mid-1943. Around this time, he also began planning guerrilla operations against the Partisans with Gestapo officer Kurt Koppel in the event of Germany's defeat. The number of Partisans in the NDH continued to grow, from a mere 7,000 in 1941, to 25,000 in 1942, and 100,000 in late 1943. On 8 September 1943, the Italians capitulated to the Allies. Countless Italian units surrendered to the Partisans, who disarmed them and thus acquired a significant amount of modern weaponry. Luburić remained sidelined for much of 1944, but his fortunes changed after the Lorković–Vokić plot came to light in August 1944. On 30 August, Luburić personally oversaw the arrests of government ministers Mladen Lorković and Ante Vokić. Lorković, the Minister of Internal Affairs, and Vokić, the Minister of Defense, were accused of conspiring to overthrow Pavelić and install a pro-Allied government. Following their arrests, Luburić was tasked with interrogating Lorković and Vokić, as well as other suspected conspirators. That October, Luburić was promoted to the rank of Pukovnik (Colonel). In December 1944, the Croatian Home Guard and the Ustaše Militia were unified to create the Croatian Armed Forces. On 7 December, Luburić forced more than thirty members of the collaborationist Serbian Volunteer Corps off a train passing through Zagreb's main railway station and ordered that they be shot. Destined for Slovenia, they had received Pavelić's approval to pass through Zagreb unmolested, but Luburić showed no regard.

=== Terror in Sarajevo ===
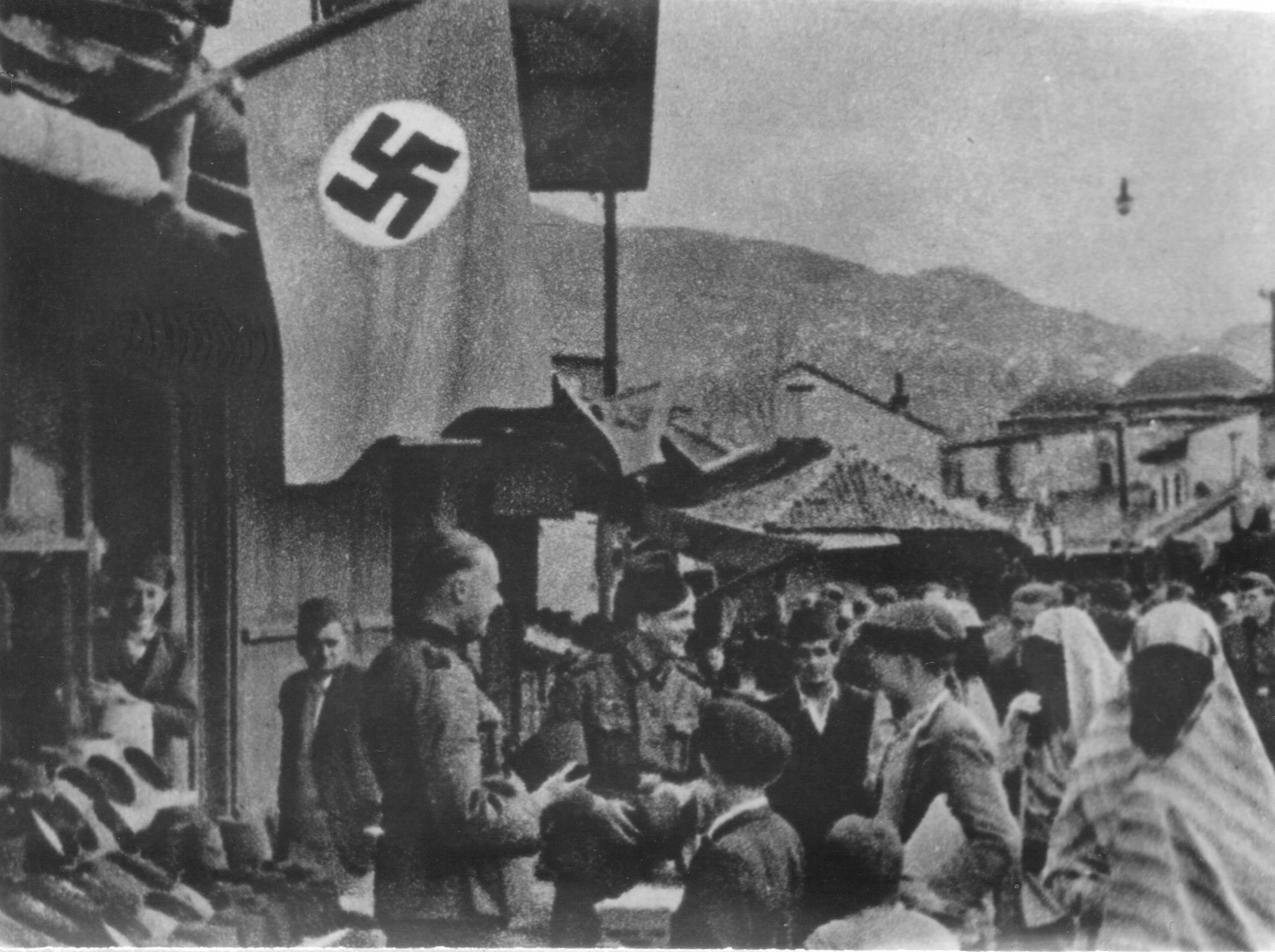
German-occupied Sarajevo

In early 1945, Pavelić dispatched Luburić to Sarajevo to undermine the communist underground there. Luburić arrived in the city on 15 February. Five days later, Hitler declared Sarajevo a Festung (or "fortress"), insisting that it be defended at all costs. Hitler appointed General Heinz Kathner to organize the city's defences in anticipation of a Partisan attack. On 24 February, Kathner organized a banquet in Luburić's honour. At the banquet, Luburić announced his intention to destroy the communist resistance in Sarajevo. Luburić soon appointed nine Ustaše officers to a special task force for carrying out executions of known and suspected communists. His headquarters was located inside a villa in downtown Sarajevo, which came to be known as the "house of terror" among the city's residents.

On 1 March, the Partisans launched Operation Sarajevo, which aimed to wrest the city from the Germans and the Ustaše. By early March, Sarajevo had been encircled and cut off from the rest of the NDH. Luburić established a kangaroo court that he dubbed the Criminal War Court of Commander Luburić, which dealt with cases of alleged treason. The court also dealt with more gratuitous charges such as price fixing. The first batch of prisoners to be tried was a group of 17 Muslim refugees from Mostar. Over the course of the month, dozens of suspected communists were executed. The arrests and subsequent executions were of an alarmingly arbitrary nature, which only served to exacerbate the terror felt by Sarajevans. According to survivors, the torture method most commonly used by Luburić's agents involved tying prisoners' hands behind their backs, pulling their hands between their legs, placing a rod between their knees, hanging them upside down and then beating them. These torture sessions, which the Ustaše euphemistically referred to as interrogations, were usually followed by the prisoner's execution or deportation to a concentration camp. Luburić is said to have revelled in inviting the family members of his victims to the villa and then describing in great detail how their loved ones had been tortured and killed. As the killings progressed, some Sarajevans took to bomb shelters in fear for their lives, though the city had not been bombed in weeks.

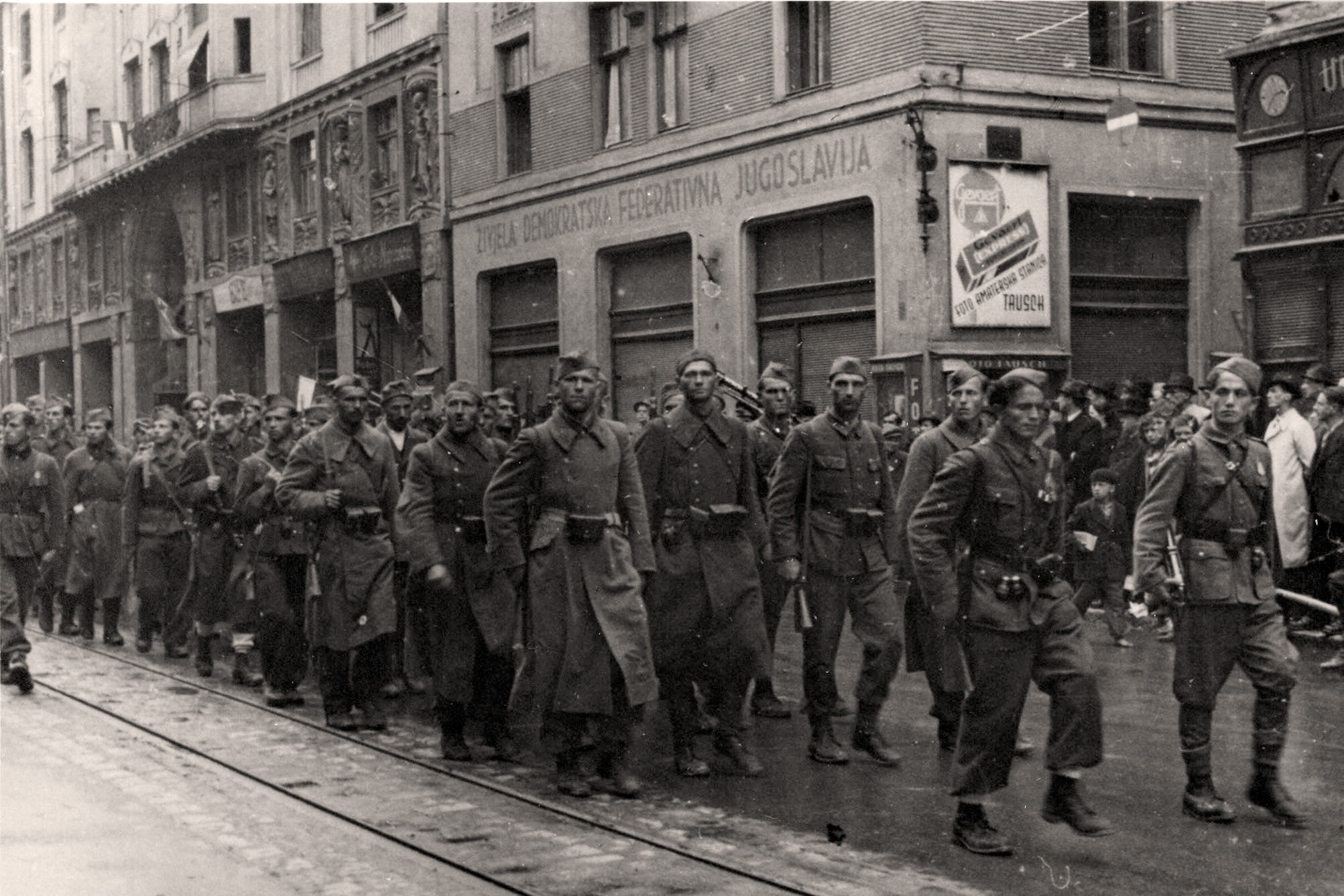
The Partisans enter Sarajevo

On 16 March, Luburić convened a meeting of over 1,000 Ustaše political and military figures, and in the presence of senior German officials, issued a declaration denouncing Bolshevism, the Yalta Conference, and the new communist government in Belgrade. On 21 March, the Ustaše uncovered a plot to assassinate Luburić. His would-be assassin was a communist youth named Halid Nazečić, who was betrayed by one of his accomplices. Four Ustaše were subsequently killed in Partisan attacks within the city. On the night of 27–28 March, the Ustaše hanged fifty-five Sarajevans from trees and street lamps in Sarajevo's Marindvor neighbourhood. Signs bearing the phrase, "Long live the Poglavnik!" were placed around their necks. Their bodies were left to hang as an example to others. Those attempting to retrieve the bodies were fired upon. On 4 April, Luburić and his entourage left Sarajevo. About 350 Ustaše policemen and 400 Ustaše soldiers stayed behind to defend the city. Luburić's reign of terror in Sarajevo claimed 323 lives, according to a post-war war crimes commission. Several hundred others were deported to concentration camps. The Partisans entered Sarajevo on 6 April and proclaimed its liberation. The city's capture coincided with the fourth anniversary of the Axis invasion of Yugoslavia. The exhumation of bodies from the backyard of Luburić's villa, many of which belonged to children, was documented by a Soviet film crew. Another witness to the aftermath of Luburić's crimes was the American journalist Landrum Bolling, who recalled seeing a roomful of bodies "stacked like cordwood on top of one another." Many of the cadavers showed signs of torture and mutilation. Among the corpses was that of Halid Nazečić, whose head had been mutilated, eyes gouged out and genitals burned with boiling water.

=== Destruction of the NDH ===
Upon leaving Sarajevo, Luburić boarded a plane for Zagreb. While attempting to land at the Borongaj airfield, Luburić's plane crashed on a bomb-damaged runway. Luburić sustained a head injury and had to be hospitalized. Pavelić visited Luburić while he was convalescing and found his subordinate jaded and disillusioned, accusing the Germans of betraying Croatia. Shortly thereafter, Luburić was promoted to the rank of General. In early April, he ordered that Jasenovac's remaining prisoners be killed. He also ordered that documents pertaining to the camp's operation be destroyed, and the corpses from surrounding mass graves exhumed and cremated. Several individuals who possessed incriminating information pertaining to Luburić's wartime activities, such as the Gestapo agent Koppel, were killed at his behest. In late April, Luburić approved the executions of Lorković and Vokić, as well as others who had been implicated in the Lorković–Vokić plot.

As the Partisans neared, Luburić suggested that the Ustaše make their last stand in Zagreb, but Pavelić refused. The Ustaše were divided as to what to do. Some proposed retreating towards Austria as quickly as possible. Others, Luburić foremost among them, advocated establishing irregular formations in the countryside that would carry out guerrilla attacks following the NDH's demise. On 24 April, forty-three Roma and Sinti were killed in Hrastina by Luburić's followers. In early May, Luburić met with the Archbishop of Zagreb, Aloysius Stepinac, who implored him not to put up armed resistance against the Partisans. On 5 May, the government of the NDH left Zagreb, followed by Pavelić. By 15 May, the NDH had completely collapsed. Tens of thousands of Ustaše surrendered to the British Army but were handed back to the Partisans. An untold number were killed in subsequent Partisan reprisal killings, together with several thousand Serbian and Slovenian collaborationists.

Some Ustaše, who came to be known as Crusaders (Croatian: Križari), remained in Yugoslavia and carried out guerrilla attacks against the communists. Among these was a small group of fighters led by Luburić, which remained in the forests of southern Slovenia and northern Slavonia, skirmishing with the newly formed Yugoslav People's Army (Serbo-Croatian: Jugoslovenska narodna armija; JNA). Luburić evaded capture and probable execution by placing his identification papers next to the body of a dead soldier. Through Matković and Moškov, Luburić sent a letter to Pavelić, who had escaped to Austria, in which he signalled his intention to keep fighting. Three different accounts exist of Luburić's activities in post-war Yugoslavia. According to one, Luburić then headed south towards the Bilogora mountain range, where he rendezvoused with a group of more than fifty Crusaders under the leadership of Branko Bačić. They headed west, establishing a base at Fruška Gora. In November 1945, Luburić and about a dozen Crusaders crossed the Hungarian–Yugoslav border and escaped Yugoslavia. The second version holds that Luburić was wounded in a gunfight with the JNA, and carried across the Drava River to Hungary by General Rafael Boban, who subsequently returned to Yugoslavia and was never heard from again. The third version, espoused by Luburić himself, is that Luburić fought with the Crusaders until late 1947 when he was seriously wounded and forced to leave the country.

Luburić's half-sister Nada and her husband Dinko Šakić escaped to Argentina. Some of Luburić's remaining kin were not as fortunate. Miloš was captured by the Yugoslav authorities in July 1947, together with several other Crusaders, after sneaking back into the country as part of the Crusaders' insurgency efforts. He was subsequently put on trial for the atrocities that he committed during the war. During his trial, he confessed in graphic detail to his role in the killings that took place at Jasenovac. He was convicted on all counts and executed in 1948.

== Later years ==
=== Exile ===
In 1949, Luburić relocated to Spain. The country was viewed as a favourable destination by many Ustaše exiles, as it had been the only one outside the Axis to recognize the NDH. Luburić entered Spain under the pseudonym Maximilian Soldo. (Note: This pseudonym was evidently created using a variation of Luburić's nickname, Maks, and his mother's maiden name, Soldo.) Upon arrival, Luburić was imprisoned by the Spanish authorities, but released shortly thereafter. With support from Agustín Muñoz Grandes, the former commander of the Blue Division, he was able to settle in the country. He took up residence in Benigànim.

Pavelić, in the meantime, had settled in Buenos Aires with his family and started a construction business. He became the unofficial leader of the Croatian émigré community in South America. Pavelić's exile in distant and remote Argentina rendered him virtually irrelevant in the eyes of increasing numbers of Croatian émigrés elsewhere, particularly in Europe. Faced with open rebellion, in July 1950, Pavelić dispatched Luburić to Rome as a warning to anyone wishing to challenge his authority in Western Europe's Croatian émigré communities. Given his wartime record, Luburić arrived "with a fearsome reputation," the historian Guy Walters writes. In August, Pavelić issued a declaration in a Chicago-based Croatian diaspora newspaper, warning Croats against joining foreign militaries. While Luburić is not thought to have killed any of Pavelić's political opponents in the post-war period, the mere invocation of his name drastically reduced the size of the anti-Pavelić faction among the émigrés. When the grumblings of discontent against Pavelić subsided, Luburić returned to Spain. In 1951, he appeared in Hamburg and set up a recruiting centre for the pro-Pavelić faction. That same year, he established a newspaper called Drina. In November 1953, Luburić married a Spanish woman named Isabela Hernaiz. The couple went on to have four children, two boys and two girls.

=== Rift with Pavelić ===
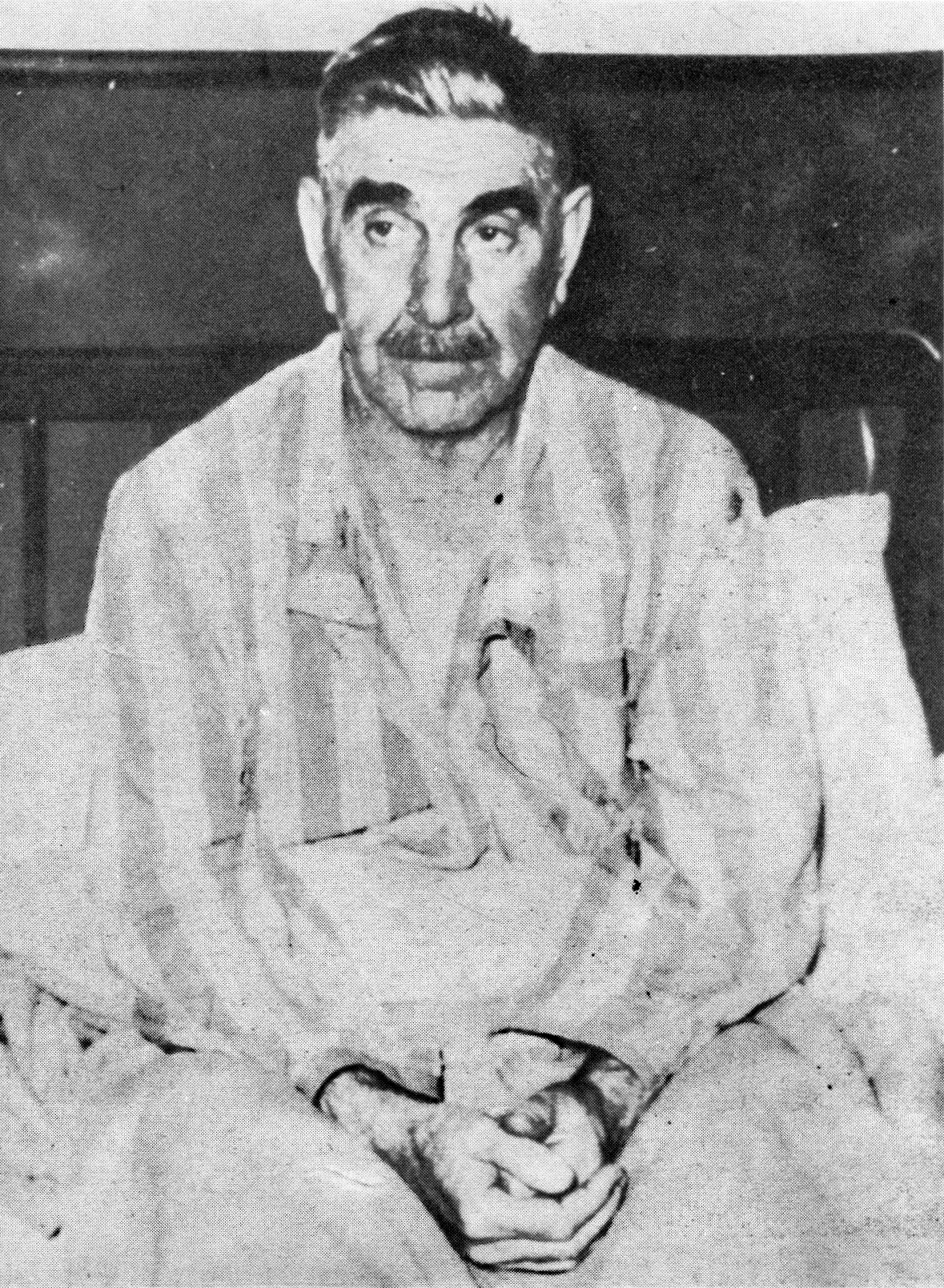
Pavelić recovering from his wounds in a Buenos Aires hospital. After Pavelić's death in 1959, Luburić unsuccessfully attempted to take control of the Pavelić-founded Croatian Liberation Movement.

In 1954, Pavelić entered discussions with former Yugoslav Prime Minister Milan Stojadinović over the future partition of Bosnia and Herzegovina between Greater Croatia and Greater Serbia in the event of Yugoslavia's collapse. Luburić was incensed. In his writings, Luburić argued that Croatia, much like the NDH, should extend as far as the Drina River, but also include areas of Serbia, such as Sandžak, which had never been part of the wartime puppet state. Luburić vehemently denounced Pavelić and his followers. Shortly thereafter, he founded the Friends of the Drina Society (Croatian: Društvo Prijatelja Drine) and the Croatian National Resistance (Croatian: Hrvatski narodni odpor; HNO). In June 1956, Pavelić founded a rival organization, the Croatian Liberation Movement (Croatian: Hrvatski oslobodilački pokret; HOP).

In 1957, Luburić's wife received an anonymous letter detailing her husband's wartime atrocities, with great emphasis placed on his role in the killing of children. She filed for divorce shortly thereafter. During the divorce proceedings, Luburić was granted joint custody of the couple's children, as well as possession of their home. The same year, he sold the home and moved to the town of Carcaixent, near Valencia, where he opened a poultry farm. The farm quickly went out of business and Luburić soon became a traveling salesman. Upon moving to Carcaixent, he founded Drina Press, an amateur publishing house, which was situated in his home. Luburić's neighbours, who knew him by the name Vicente Pérez García, were apparently unaware of his wartime past. He wrote articles under the pseudonyms General Drinjanin and Bojnik Dizdar (Colonel Dizdar). In his writings, Luburić conceded that he had made certain mistakes during the war, but never admitted to or expressed remorse for the atrocities that had been attributed to him. He advocated "national reconciliation" between the pro-Ustaše and pro-communist Croats. Luburić also claimed to have made contact with the Soviet Union's intelligence services. He argued that Croatia should become a neutral state in the event of Yugoslavia's disintegration, which was received particularly poorly in some fiercely anti-communist Croatian émigré circles.

On 10 April 1957, while returning from a celebratory gathering marking the anniversary of the NDH's establishment in Buenos Aires, Pavelić was seriously wounded in an assassination attempt by the State Security Administration (Serbo-Croatian: Uprava državne bezbednosti; UDBA), the Yugoslav secret service. He died in Madrid in December 1959 of complications related to his wounds. Owing to the mutual resentment between the two men, Luburić was barred from attending his funeral. Following Pavelić's death, Luburić unsuccessfully attempted to take control of the HOP, citing his role as the last commander of the Croatian Armed Forces. After the HOP's senior leadership rebuffed him, Luburić went down an increasingly militarist path, establishing neo-Ustaše training camps in several European countries and publishing articles relating to military tactics and guerrilla techniques. In the early 1960s, the HNO pursued Arab support for the formal recognition of the exiled Croatian state and to secure Saudi material assistance in "the fight against communism and for the liberation of Croatia." This initiative was largely shaped by Mahmoud K. Muftić, a Bosnian Muslim member of the HNO executive, who later fell out with Luburić. Muftić wrote that he considered Luburić a strange person who confused desire with reality, an irritable and unsettled man, "mentally ill, sometimes more, sometimes less," and "an infantile revolutionary." In 1963, Luburić established a paper called Obrana ("Defense").

== Death ==
On the morning of 21 April 1969, Luburić's teenage son discovered his father's bloody corpse in one of the bedrooms in his home. Luburić had been killed the day before. Blood stains on the floor suggested he had been dragged by his feet from the kitchen and crudely stuffed under a bed. He had been bludgeoned over the head multiple times with a blunt instrument. An autopsy determined that Luburić had not died from the blows to his head, but rather that he had choked on his own blood. He was buried in Carcaixent in a funeral ceremony attended by hundreds of Croatian nationalists wearing Ustaše uniforms, who chanted Ustaše slogans and delivered fascist salutes. Luburić's death spelt the end of Drina and Obrana.

Luburić's murder came at a time when the UDBA was carrying out assassinations of leading Croatian nationalist figures across Europe and suspicion inevitably fell on them. (Note: Luburić was the nineteenth of twenty Croatian nationalist émigrés who were killed between 1966 and 1969. The scholar Mate Nikola Tokić describes Luburić as "the most prominent victim at the hands of an assassin during the first wave of state-sponsored [UDBA] murders." As many as 73 Croatian nationalists may have been assassinated by the Yugoslav intelligence services between 1945 and 1991.) In 1967, Luburić had employed his godson, Ilija Stanić, to work at his publishing firm. Stanić's father, Vinko, had served alongside Luburić during the war. He was captured by the Yugoslav authorities while fighting with the Crusaders and died in captivity. Declassified Yugoslav intelligence documents show that Stanić was a UDBA agent, codenamed Mongoose. According to the minutes of his May 1969 debriefing, Stanić told his handlers that he first poisoned Luburić's coffee, which had been given to him by another UDBA agent. After the poison failed to kill him, Stanić began to panic and went to his room to retrieve a hammer. When he returned to the kitchen, Luburić complained he was feeling unwell. As he went to vomit in the sink, Stanić struck him over the head several times, causing him to fall to the floor. Stanić then left the kitchen to make sure the front door was locked. When he returned, he saw Luburić standing over the sink and wincing in pain. Stanić struck him over the head once more, fracturing his skull, and then wrapped his body in blankets and dragged it to a nearby bedroom. Stanić said he initially wanted to hide the body in the print shop, but that Luburić was too heavy, so he decided to hide it under the bed and calmly left the house. He then fled to France before making his way back to Yugoslavia. In a speech delivered on 20 May 1969, exactly one month after the murder, Tito hinted at the UDBA's responsibility for the string of recent assassinations of Croatian émigrés, and noted how the agency had achieved some remarkable successes, "especially recently."

In a July 2009 interview with the Croatian weekly Globus, Stanić changed his story, claiming that Luburić had been killed by two HOP members. Aggrieved by a disparaging comment that Luburić had allegedly made about Stanić's father and his post-war guerrilla activities, Stanić claims that he sought out the two men, who assured him that they merely wished to administer a beating. The day that Luburić was murdered, Stanić alleged that he allowed the men inside Luburić's home, and the two then killed Luburić with a single blow to the head from a heavy metal bar. In 2012, Stanić changed his story once more, this time accusing two different men of killing Luburić. As of 2020, Stanić lived freely in Sarajevo.

== Legacy ==
=== Influence on Croatian nationalism ===
Following Luburić's death, the leadership of the HNO went to several of his close associates, eventually splitting into rival leaderships in North America, Australia, Sweden and Argentina. Leadership of the HNO's Argentine faction was delegated to Luburić's brother-in-law Dinko Šakić. In April 1971, two HNO affiliates entered the Yugoslav embassy in Stockholm and killed Yugoslavia's ambassador to Sweden, Vladimir Rolović. The two men were arrested but set free the following year after a group of Croatian nationalists hijacked a Swedish domestic flight demanding their release. One of Rolović's killers, Miro Barešić, underwent a baptism while in prison and adopted the Christian name Vjekoslav in Luburić's honour. The HNO boasted several thousand members at its height. Notable members included Zvonko Bušić, Gojko Šušak and Mladen Naletilić, among others. Bušić masterminded the hijacking of TWA Flight 355 in September 1976. Šušak became Croatia's Minister of Defence in 1991. Naletilić was convicted of committing war crimes against Bosniak civilians during the Bosnian War by the International Criminal Tribunal for the former Yugoslavia (ICTY). He was sentenced to 20 years in prison.

During the Croatian War of Independence, open admiration for Luburić could be found in the Croatian Army's officer corps. Ante Luburić (no relation), who served as a senior officer during the Battle of Vukovar, was nicknamed Maks by his confederates because of his battlefield ferocity. Luburić "seemed pleased with his sobriquet", the journalist Robert Fox remarked. In early 1992, General Mirko Norac expressed admiration for Luburić after being relieved of his duties on the orders of Croatian President Franjo Tuđman. "Fuck all the Croatian generals with Tuđman at the top," Norac remarked. "The only general for me is ... Maks Luburić." Luburić is referenced in the opening lines of the Croatian nationalist song "Jasenovac i Gradiška Stara", which read as follows:

Jasenovac i Gradiška Stara
to je kuća Maksovih mesara ...

Jasenovac and Stara Gradiška
that's the house of Maks' butchers ...

Darko Hudelist, a journalist and Tuđman biographer, considers Luburić one of the three most important Croatian political figures of the post-war period, alongside Tito and Tuđman. Hudelist argues that Tuđman was influenced by Luburić's writings, which called for the unification of the ideologically disparate factions that made up the Croatian diaspora. This became a key policy priority of Tuđman's Croatian Democratic Union during his presidency. The historian Ivo Goldstein concurs with Hudelist's hypothesis and surmises that Luburić in turn was influenced by Francisco Franco's calls for reconciliation between Republicans and Nationalists in the aftermath of the Spanish Civil War. Hudelist's hypothesis has been challenged by the journalist Ivan Bekavac, who accuses Hudelist of attempting to cast Tuđman in a pro-fascist light.

In 2017, flyers containing excerpts from a speech delivered by Luburić appeared in Sarajevo's Dobrinja neighbourhood. In July 2018, Spain's ruling Socialist Workers' Party proposed a law against the memorization of fascist figures. It was speculated that if the law was passed, the Spanish authorities would be able to usurp Pavelić and Luburić's tombs, under the pretext that they had become places of pilgrimage for neo-fascists, and move them to less prominent locations or transfer them to Bosnia. On 29 September 2018, the historian Vlado Vladić held an event at a Roman Catholic priory in Split promoting his book Hrvatski vitez Vjekoslav Maks Luburić ("The Croatian Knight Vjekoslav "Maks" Luburić"). The event was condemned by the Croatian left, who accused Vladić of glorifying Luburić and the Catholic Church of facilitating historical revisionism. Among those in attendance was Dario Kordić, who served as the vice-president of the Croatian Republic of Herzeg-Bosnia during the Bosnian War. Kordić was later found guilty of war crimes and crimes against humanity by the ICTY for his role in the Lašva Valley ethnic cleansing, and was sentenced to 25 years in prison.

=== Assessment ===
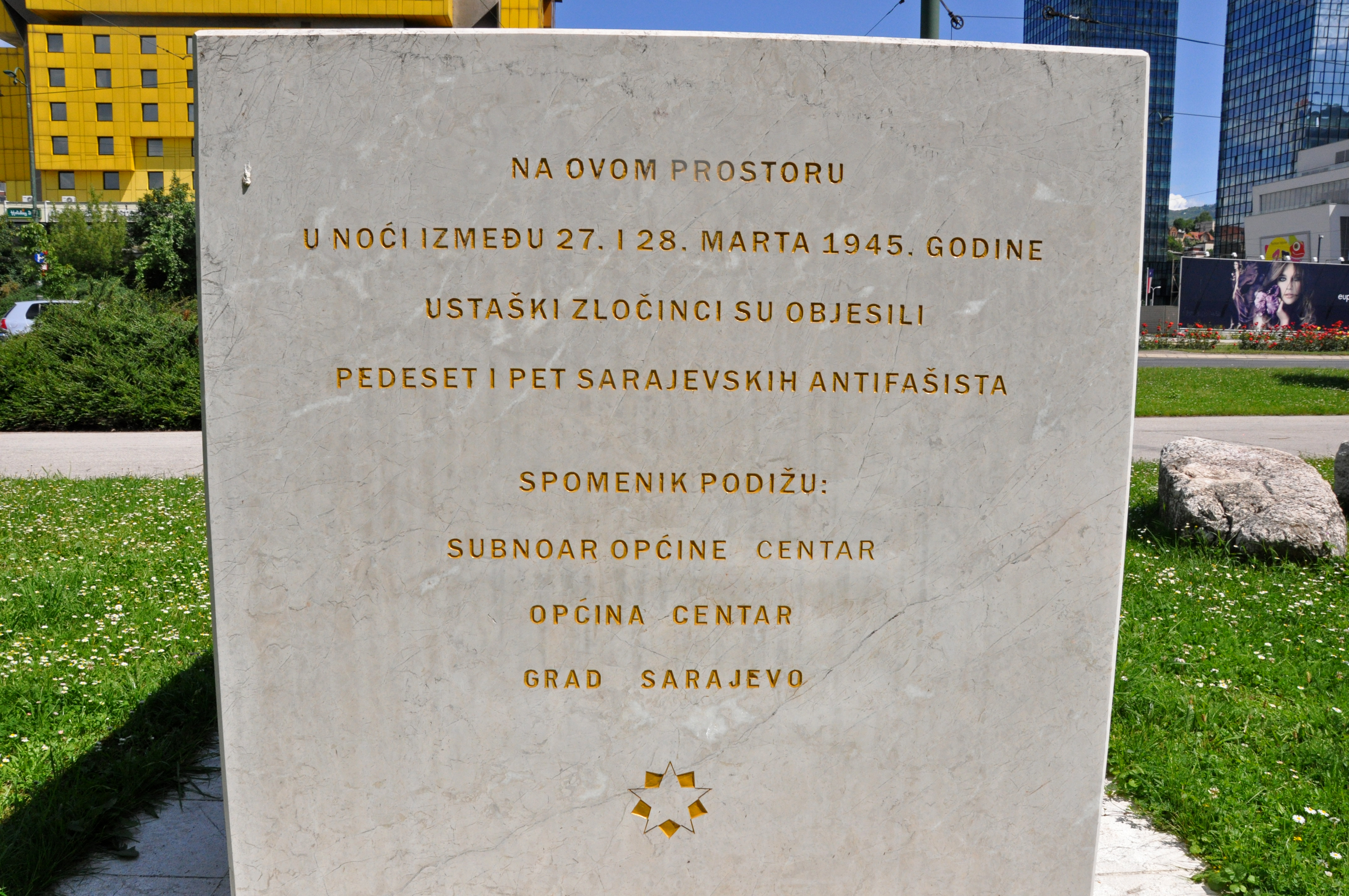
A monument commemorating the 55 Sarajevans hanged on Luburić's orders on the night of 27–28 March 1945

Contemporary German accounts place the number of Serbs killed by the Ustaše at about 350,000. According to the United States Holocaust Memorial Museum, between 320,000 and 340,000 Serbs were killed by the Ustaše throughout the war. Most modern historians agree that the Ustaše killed over 300,000 Serbs, or about 17 per cent of all Serbs living in the NDH. At the Nuremberg trials, these killings were judged to have constituted genocide. The Ustaše were also responsible for the deaths of 26,000 Jews and 20,000 Roma. The historian Emily Greble estimates that approximately 200,000 wartime deaths can be attributed to Luburić. During the war, Luburić boasted that the Ustaše had killed more Serbs in Jasenovac, "than the Ottoman Empire was able to do during its occupation of Europe." He also confided in Hermann Neubacher, the Reich Ministry of Foreign Affairs' Plenipotentiary for Southeastern Europe, that he believed about 225,000 Serbs had been killed at Jasenovac. An incomplete list of victims compiled by the Jasenovac Memorial Site contains the names of 83,145 individuals, including 47,627 Serbs, 16,173 Roma and 13,116 Jews. Most historians agree that around 100,000 people were killed at Jasenovac.

In 1998, Šakić was arrested in Argentina. The following year, he was extradited to Croatia to face charges of war crimes and crimes against humanity. Šakić was convicted on all counts and sentenced to twenty years' imprisonment. He died in July 2008. Luburić's half-sister Nada was arrested around the same time as her husband but was released due to lack of evidence. She died in February 2011. In July 2011, the Government of Serbia issued a warrant for her arrest, apparently unaware that she had died earlier that year. When the Serbian authorities learned of her death, the warrant was revoked. Šakić described his brother-in-law as a "humanitarian" and "a protector of the Jews". Several of Luburić's contemporaries, as well as numerous scholars, have offered a starkly different assessment. Arthur Häffner, an Abwehr officer, denounced Luburić as one of Pavelić's "fiercest bloodhounds." In academic literature, Luburić is frequently described as a sadist. The Holocaust scholar Uki Goñi characterizes him as "a bloodthirsty madman." "Of all the Poglavnik's thugs," Walters writes, "Luburić was the worst." Jozo Tomasevich, a historian specializing in the Balkans, described Luburić as one of the "most brutal and bloodthirsty" members of the Ustaše movement. Carmichael refers to Luburić as "one of the most notorious war criminals of the Second World War." The historians Ladislaus Hory and Martin Broszat describe Luburić as "one of the most feared and most hated" Ustaše leaders. (Note: See Hory & Broszat 1964, p. 87: "Die Leitung der Lager lag in den Händen des Ustascha-Führers Vjeskoslav Luburic, der zu den meistgefürchteten und meistgehaßten Spitzenfiguren des Ustascha-Regimes gehörte.")
