= Andrija Betlehem =

- Born: November 19, 1879; Peteranec, Austria-Hungary
- Died: November 1943 (aged 63/64); Rasinja, Independent State of Croatia
- Occupations: peasant, politician
- Known for: Deputy of Poglavnik (Croatian: Doglavnik) in Independent State of Croatia and member of the Croatian parliament

Andrija Betlehem (1879–1943) was member of the "Doglavnik's Council" (Croatian: Doglavničko vijeće) of the Main Ustaša Headquarters, the ruling body of the Ustaša party in the Independent State of Croatia.

Betlehem was born on 19 November 1879 in Peteranec into a Jewish family. His occupation was tillage. He was known as a supporter of Josip Frank. He lived near Hungarian border and established a channel for transport of Ustaše from Croatia to their training camp in Janka Pusta. On 16 July 1941 he was appointed on the position of doglavnik and on 23 February 1942 he became a member of the newly created Croatian assembly (Croatian: Hrvatski Državni Sabor). Appointment of Betlehem and Lešić as Deputies of Poglavnik was additional step of the policy of appointing numerous Ustaše peasants to leading positions in Croatia considered as "country of peasants" in Ustaše ideology.

In November 1943 the communist forces captured Betlehem, sentenced him to death and executed him near Rasinja.

== Sources ==
- Stuparić, Darko (1997). Tko je tko u NDH: Hrvatska 1941.-1945. Minerva. ISBN 978-953-6377-03-9.
- Jelić-Butić, Fikreta (1983). Hrvatska seljačka stranka. Delo.
