= Main Ustaša Headquarters =

Croatian ruling body

The Main Ustaša Headquarters (Croatian: Glavni ustaški stan - GUS) was the ruling body of the Ustaša party in the Independent State of Croatia, convened under the poglavnik, Ante Pavelić.

== Establishment ==
The Ustaše emigrants lived in many different countries, but since 1929, the most important and most numerous group was group of Ustaše emigrants in Italy, led by Ante Pavelić. The Main Ustaša Headquarters evolved from Croatian Emigrant Office (Croatian: Hrvatska emigrantska kancelarija) established by Pavelić in Milan, Italy and managed by Stanko Hranilović who also used alias Stanko Đurić and was one of the closest associates of Pavelić at that time. The group of Ustaše in Italy consisted of about 500 emigrants. The Main Ustaša Headquarters was first situated in Bovegno, Italy.

== Organization ==
The Main Ustaša Headquarters consisted of poglavnik, Doglavničko vijeće, Pobočnički zbor and commissioners. It is assumed that before the World War II only Mile Budak was appointed as doglavnik (in 1934) and Marko Došen as president of the Doglavničko vijeće.

The Council of the deputy chiefs of state (Doglavničko vijeće), a body of the Main Ustaša Headquarters, was made up of no more than twelve doglavniks (deputy leaders) at any one time and no more than 7 poglavni pobočniks (adjutants). In May 1941 Pavelić signed the law which defined Main Ustaša Headquarters as supreme body of Ustaše organization.

=== Doglavničko vijeće ===
In March 1941, the members of Doglavničko vijeće were:

- Andrija Betlehem
- Mile Budak
- Marko Došen
- Slavko Kvaternik
- Luka Lešić
- Stjepan Matijević
- Ademaga Mešić

=== Pobočnički zbor ===
Besides doglavniks and their council, the Main Ustaša Headquarters had members who were adjutants (doglavni pobočnici) who constituted their own council (Pobočnički zbor) whose members were:

- Blaž Lorković
- Ivan Oršanić
- Ivan Javor
- Mijo Bzik
- Alija Šuljak
- Mira Vrličak-Dugački
- Vjekoslav Blaškov
- Hakija Hadžić

=== Commissioners ===
Besides Poglavnik, his deputies and adjutants, the leadership of the Ustaše organization had also commissioners who were appointed by poglavnik. It is important to differentiate commissioners of the Main Ustaša Headquarters from commissioners temporarily appointed as temporary authorities to establish Croatian control of certain regions.

The commissioners of the Main Ustaša Headquarters included:

- Zdenko Blažeković, a commissioner for physical education and sport
- Božo Cerovski, a commissioner for internal affairs and security
- Eugen Dido Kvaternik
- Vjekoslav Luburić
- Vilko Pećnikar
- Branko Rukavina
- Frane Miletić
- Ante Štitić
- Vlado Singer
- Vlado Herceg
- Vlado Jonić
- Franjo Laslo
- Aleksandar Seitz
- Danijel Crljen, a commissioner for education and propaganda
- Šime Cvitanović
- Mira Vrličak Dugački
- Dragan Dujmović
- Tomiša Grgić
- Marijan Šimić
- Nikola Jurišić
- Mato Jagodić
- Ivan Pregrad

== Sources ==
- Ademović, Fadil (2000). Novinstvo i ustaška propaganda u Nezavisnoj državi Hrvatskoj: štampa i radio u Bosni i Hercegovini, 1941-1945. Medija centar. ISBN 9789958505034.
- Šibl, Ivan (1967). Zagreb 1941. Naprijed.
- Basta, Milan (1986). Rat je završen 7 dana kasnije. Privredni pregled.
- Krizman, Bogdan (1983). Ante Pavelić i ustaše. Globus.
- Kolanović, Nada Kisić (1997). Vojskovođa i politika: sjećanja Slavka Kvaternika. Golden marketing. ISBN 978-953-6168-30-9.
- Jelić-Butić, Fikreta (1977). Ustaše i Nezavisna Država Hrvatska: 1941-1945. Sveučiliǎna naklada Liber; Školska knjiga.
- Matković, Hrvoje (2007). Designirani hrvatski kralj Tomislav II. Pavičić. ISBN 9789536308736.
- Peršen, Mirko (1990). Ustaški logori. Globus. ISBN 978-86-343-0547-0.
- Stuparić, Darko (1997). Tko je tko u NDH: Hrvatska 1941.-1945. Minerva. ISBN 978-953-6377-03-9.
- Novak, Božidar (2005). Hrvatsko novinarstvo u 20. stoljeću. Golden marketing-Tehnička knjiga. ISBN 978-953-212-194-0.
- Šipovac, Neđo (1987). Ljeto na gori, 1941. Veselin Masleša. ISBN 978-86-21-00133-0.
- Bulajić, Milan (1989). Ustaški zločini genocida i suđenje Andriji Artukoviću 1986. godine. Izdavačka radna organizacija "Rad". ISBN 9788609001369.
- Colić, Mladen (1973). Takozvana NDH. Delta-pres.
