= Ustaše Surveillance Service =

Croatian police service

The Ustaše Surveillance Service (Croatian: Ustaška nadzorna služba, UNS) was an intelligence, counter-intelligence and political police service that operated during the existence of the Independent State of Croatia (NDH), at the time of World War II in Yugoslavia. The UNS was created by the merger of the Ustaša Intelligence Service and the Service for Concentration Camps through a law that was adopted on 16 August 1941. The UNS was dissolved by a legal provision on 21 January 1943.

From the beginning, the UNS received technical assistance and information from the German Gestapo, and its representative in Zagreb, Hans Helm, made an effort to immediately branch out a network of his own spies within the UNS, in order to completely control the work of the UNS. The UNS received significant support from the Italian secret service OVRA, and its representative in Zagreb, Ciro Verdani, again stepped in to supervise the activities of the UNS.

At the end of 1942, the leadership of the NDH agreed to dissolve the UNS (the head of the UNS, Eugen Dido Kvaternik, would write after the war that Ante Pavelić agreed to hand over complete Croatian sovereignty to Germany) and intelligence affairs were entrusted to the Gestapo. Part of the intelligence work related to the surveillance of internal political enemies continued to be carried out by the General Directorate for Public Order and Security (GRAVSIGUR), and the Minister of the Interior Andrija Artuković had a specific plan to secretly establish some kind of NDH intelligence service from the Germans.

The guards of the concentration camps in the Independent State of Croatia, the Ustaška obrana, which until then were part of the UNS, continued to operate as a separate unit after the dissolution of the UNS, under the name Ustaška obrambeni sdrug. After their commander Vjekoslav Luburić, they were also known as "Luburićevci".

== Organisation ==
At first, the UNS was divided into four departments (from 16 August 1941):

I - Ustaša police - which monitored political subjects and consisted of three special sections: communists, Serbs, Jews
II - Ustaša intelligence service
III - Ustaška obrana - a special military police unit that organised concentration camps
IV - Ustaša personal office

Afterwards, UNS was reorganised several times until it was finalised on 20 April 1942, when 15 departments were created:

I - Italian - counter-intelligence work and reviewing Italian propaganda
II - monitored the activity of the British intelligence agency
III - monitored the activities of Serbs and Chetniks in the area of NDH
IV - anti-communist department - monitors the work of the KP of Croatia and NOB
V - monitored the activities of the Muslim population and intelligence work towards Turkey
VI - monitored the activities of Jews and mixed marriages
VII - served for the detection and monitoring of political ineligibles within the Ustaša organization
VIII - served for the detection and monitoring of suspects within the administration of various ministries
IX - intelligence activities directed against people who advocated freedom and democracy, especially among representatives of elite professions
X - followed the work of the Nazi party in the NDH, Volksdeutscher and Croatian emigration in Germany
XI - monitored the work of the Hungarian intelligence service and Hungarians in the NDH
XII - monitored the activities of Slovenians in the NDH
XIII - monitored the work and activities of the Catholic Church
XIV - covered activities that are not covered by other departments
XV - counterintelligence service for military forces in the NDH

== Vlado Singer ==
Vlado Singer was made head of the UNS department, and in the summer of 1941 reported to the NDH authorities about the plans of the Kingdom of Italy to reoccupy as much of the NDH as possible, because they were not satisfied with the cooperation of the Ustaše. Whether at the instigation of the Italians (who tried to find out what UNS was doing), or because Singer was Jewish, the Germans in mid-September 1941 asked for his dismissal; Singer ended up in Stara Gradiška concentration camp, where he received good treatment for a while, but in October 1943 he was liquidated.

== Ustaška obrana ==
The Ustaška obrana had camps in NDH under its jurisdiction. In the Jasenovac concentration camp, UNS also had seven other remand prisons. According to the testimony of Dr. Oto Radan, who was imprisoned in the Slana concentration camp on Pag, that camp was also visited by the commander of the UNS, Eugen Dido Kvaternik, during his activities.

After 3 July 1941 during the Uprising of the Serbs in Herzegovina, the first commander of the Ustaška obrana (i.e., the 3rd division of the UNS) Mijo Babić was killed, the command of his men was taken over by Vjekoslav Luburić.

On 30 June 1941, Luburić was assigned to lead a punitive expedition to Lika after a small group of Serbs attacked a military patrol there. That punitive expedition committed considerable crimes against the local Serbs in the following days, but this terror did not suppress the unrest among them, and soon a Serb uprising broke out in Lika. As a result, the Italians reoccupied that and other large areas closer to the Adriatic, suspending the powers of the NDH.

Vjekoslav Luburić was still appointed commander of III. administration of the UNS, and tasked with establishing the Jasenovac camp. In addition to the Ustaška obrana members committing genocidal crimes in the camp itself, their activities outside the camp were also characterized by mass murder.

In October 1942, Luburić's subordinate Ljubo Miloš led the Jasenovac guards in an attack on civilians in nearby Crveno Bok and neighbouring villages, where they committed serious crimes against unarmed Serbs. Due to these arbitrary actions without orders and other violent activities (for example, he was inclined to shoot even his own soldiers), the Germans demanded that Luburić be tried in a military court. The guarding of the Jasenovac concentration camp continued to be entrusted, however, to around 200 "Luburićevci", who were mostly ex-convicts, imprisoned for serious crimes.
