= Ilija Stanić =

Yugoslav assassin

Ilija Stanić (19 October 1945) is believed to have assassinated Vjekoslav Luburić, a Croatian Ustasha General responsible for war crimes in Jasenovac concentration camp during World War II.

== Biography ==
Stanić was born at Čelebići near Konjic, Yugoslavia. His father, Vinko (died 1951), was an Ustasha during World War II.

Stanić left Yugoslavia in 1966. After living in France and Germany, he settled in Spain. He worked at General Vjekoslav Luburić's press in Carcaixent until 20 April 1969. On that date, Luburić was assassinated and Stanić escaped. Interpol searched for Stanić, but never caught him. In 2003, Valencian journalist, Francesc Bayarri found Stanić in Sarajevo, Bosnia and Herzegovina and interviewed him. Bayarri published a book on the subject, entitled Cita a Sarajevo (Meeting in Sarajevo).

In 2009, the Globus newspaper as per Jutarnji list, published an interview with Stanić where he claimed that he had killed Luburić because Luburić abandoned the Ustaše fascist leader Ante Pavelić.
