= Čelebići, Konjic =

Village in Bosnia and Herzegovina

Čelebići Челебићи
- Village
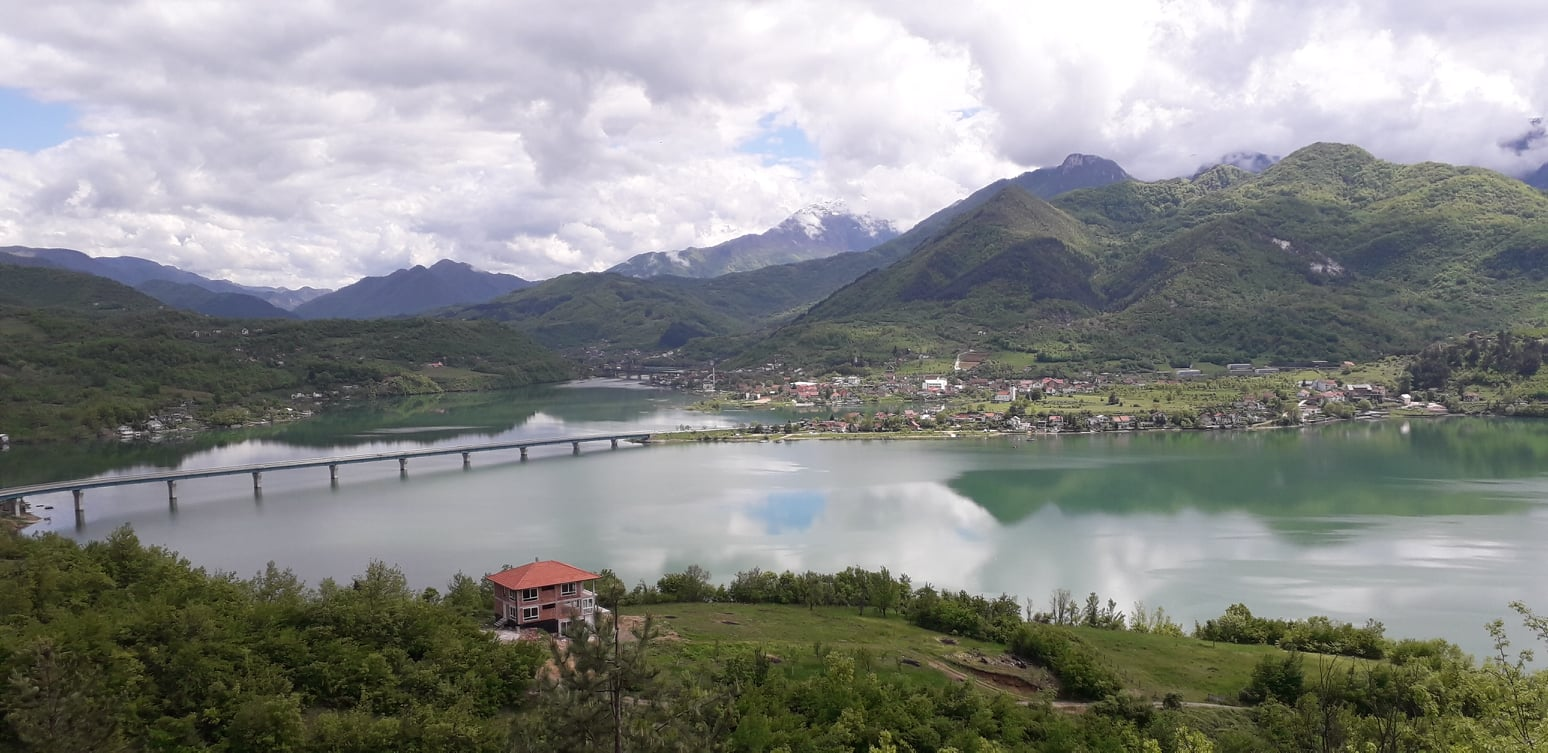

- Location within Bosnia and Herzegovina
- Coordinates: 43°41′01″N 17°53′45″E
- Country: Bosnia and Herzegovina
- Entity: Federation of Bosnia and Herzegovina
- Canton: Herzegovina-Neretva
- Municipality: Konjic

Area
  - Total: 2.41 sq mi (6.25 km^{2})

Population (2013)
  - Total: 1,062
  - Density: 440/sq mi (170/km^{2})
- Time zone: UTC+1 (CET)
  - Summer (DST): UTC+2 (CEST)

Čelebići (Serbian: Челебићи) is a village in the municipality of Konjic, Bosnia and Herzegovina.

== Demographics ==
Yugoslav censuses
Year	2013	1991	1981	1971
Muslims	987 (92.9%)	582 (47.31%)	485 (41.20%)	312 (35.41%)
Serbs	5 (0.5%)	322 (26.17%)	356 (30.24%)	337 (38.25%)
Croats	28 (2.6%)	269 (21.86%)	261 (22.17%)	214 (24.29%)
Yugoslavs	35 (2.84%)	50 (4.24%)	11 (1.24%)	
Others and unknown	42 (4.0%)	22 (1.78%)	25 (2.12%)	7 (0.79%)
Total	1,062	1,230	1,177	881

== People ==
- Ilija Stanić, Yugoslav secret police agent
