= Janka-Puszta =

Terrorist training camp

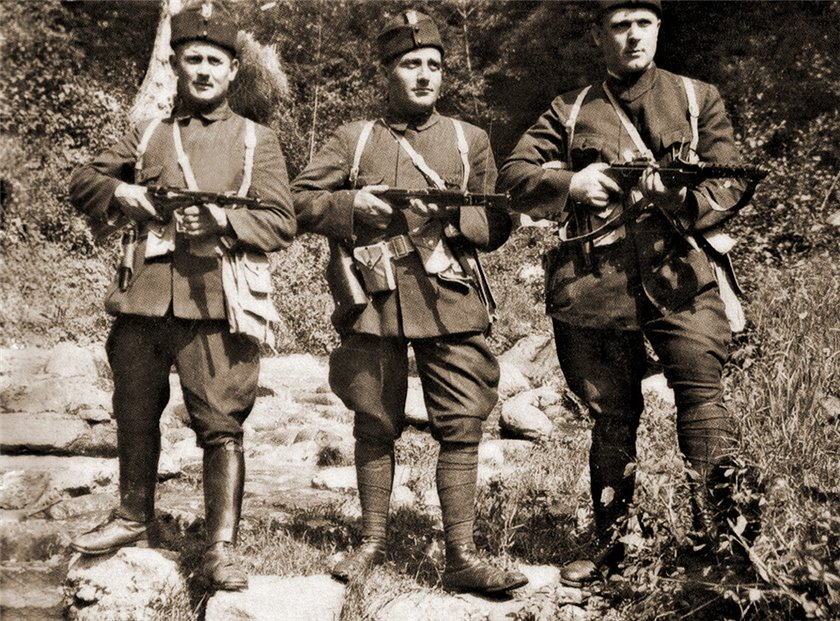
Mijo Kralj, Vlado Chernozemski and Zvonimir Pospišil performing training exercises at Janka-Puszta

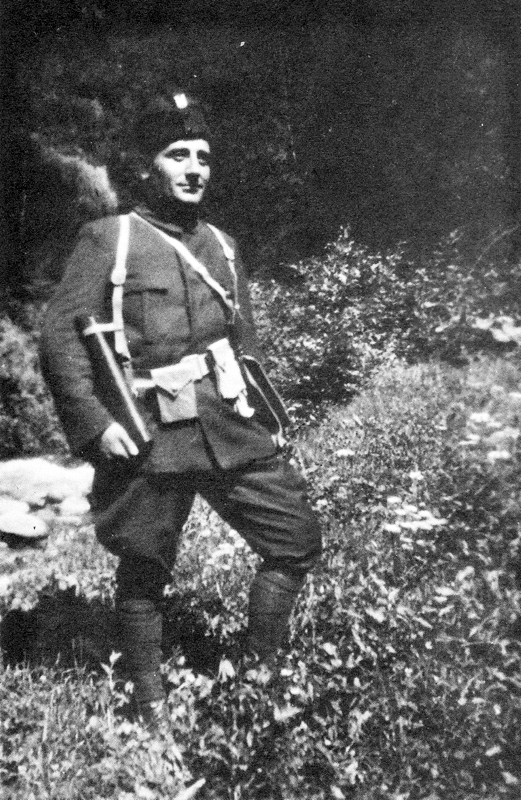
The assassin of Alexander I of Yugoslavia Chernozemski as instructor in Janka-Puszta, 1934.

Janka-Puszta or Jankovac was a training camp set up for the Ustaše organisation in 1931. The camp was located in the Zala County of Hungary, close to the border of the then Kingdom of Yugoslavia near the villages of Murakeresztúr and Belezna. The camp was one of a string of training camps established in the Kingdom of Hungary and Fascist Italy by the Ustaše. It housed several hundred émigré recruits, mostly manual laborers returning from Western Europe and North America. The recruits swore an oath of loyalty to the leader of the Ustaše, Ante Pavelić, took part in militant exercises, and produced anti-Serb propaganda material.

== Background ==
In the summer of 1931, the location was leased by the Hungarian authorities to Gustav Perčec who served as the camp commander. Ustaše members were already active in the region on both sides of the border at the time. Situated on a hill on approximately 150 acres, the camp consisted of two buildings, open fields and a forest. In November 1931, the first members of the Ustaše organisation arrived. The camp started out as a sort of commune, a refuge for fugitive members of the Ustaše group who had recently escaped from Yugoslavia. After months of preparation, Gustav Perčec began to actively seek members to join the camp. In co-operation with the Hungarian authorities, Ustaše fugitives crossing the Yugoslav-Hungarian border were interviewed by Hungarian police and their details were passed onto Percec. After it was confirmed a fugitive was not a Yugoslav spy, the Hungarian police would take them to the camp and would be provided a false name and acceptance into the camp. Andrija Betlehem lived near Hungarian border and established a channel for transport of Ustaše from Croatia to their training camp in Janka-Puszta.

Those living at the training camp partook in regimented programs. Alongside Croatian nationalism indoctrination, Ustaše members took part in military training and also, conducted duties to keep the camp running. The head instructors of weapons training were Royal Hungarian Army officers and the living conditions at the camp were said to have been poor, with camp members receiving severe punishment for any misbehavior. Much of the weaponry came from Italy, and many high ranking and prominent members of the Ustaše organisation visited the camp including Ante Pavelic. In relation with the agreement reached in 1929 between the pro-Bulgarian Internal Macedonian Revolutionary Organization (IMRO) and the Ustaše on a common struggle against Yugoslavia. As result, Bulgarian Vlado Chernozemski was designated as their instructor in special attacks and was sent to Italy in 1931. Since mid-1932, taking steps to improve its relations with Yugoslavia, the Italian authorities have closed the Borgo Val di Taro Ustaše camp. Thus Chernozemski was transferred to Janka-Puszta. From the period of 1932–1934, the camp served as the ideological and technical support base for many militant actions including the Velebit uprising and the assassination of King Alexander I of Yugoslavia.

In the camp lived also the lover of Perčec-Jelka Pogorelec, who was an agent of Yugoslav intelligence. One night she secretly crossed the border. In October 1933 she published a series of materials for the camp in the "Novosti" newspaper in Zagreb. This greatly complicated Yugoslavia's relations with Hungary. Cross-border conflicts arose between the two countries, accompanied by mutual attacks. Thus, in April 1934, Belgrade made a formal complaint to the League of Nations. There was also a complaint filled by the Hungarian regent Miklós Horthy. The League formed a commission to review the case in May. Under these circumstances, the Hungarian authorities were forced to close the camp and urgently move the Ustaše in the nearby town of Nagykanizsa. When the members of the international commission arrived at the camp, they recognized that the complaint about a terrorist camp was not correct. In this way the camp fell into disuse in late 1934.

== Sources ==
- Lampe, John R. (2000) [1996]. Yugoslavia as History: Twice There Was a Country (2nd ed.). Cambridge, England: Cambridge University Press. ISBN 978-0-521-77401-7.
- Stuparić, Darko (1997). Tko je tko u NDH: Hrvatska 1941.-1945. Minerva. ISBN 978-953-6377-03-9.
