= Croatian Encyclopedic Dictionary =

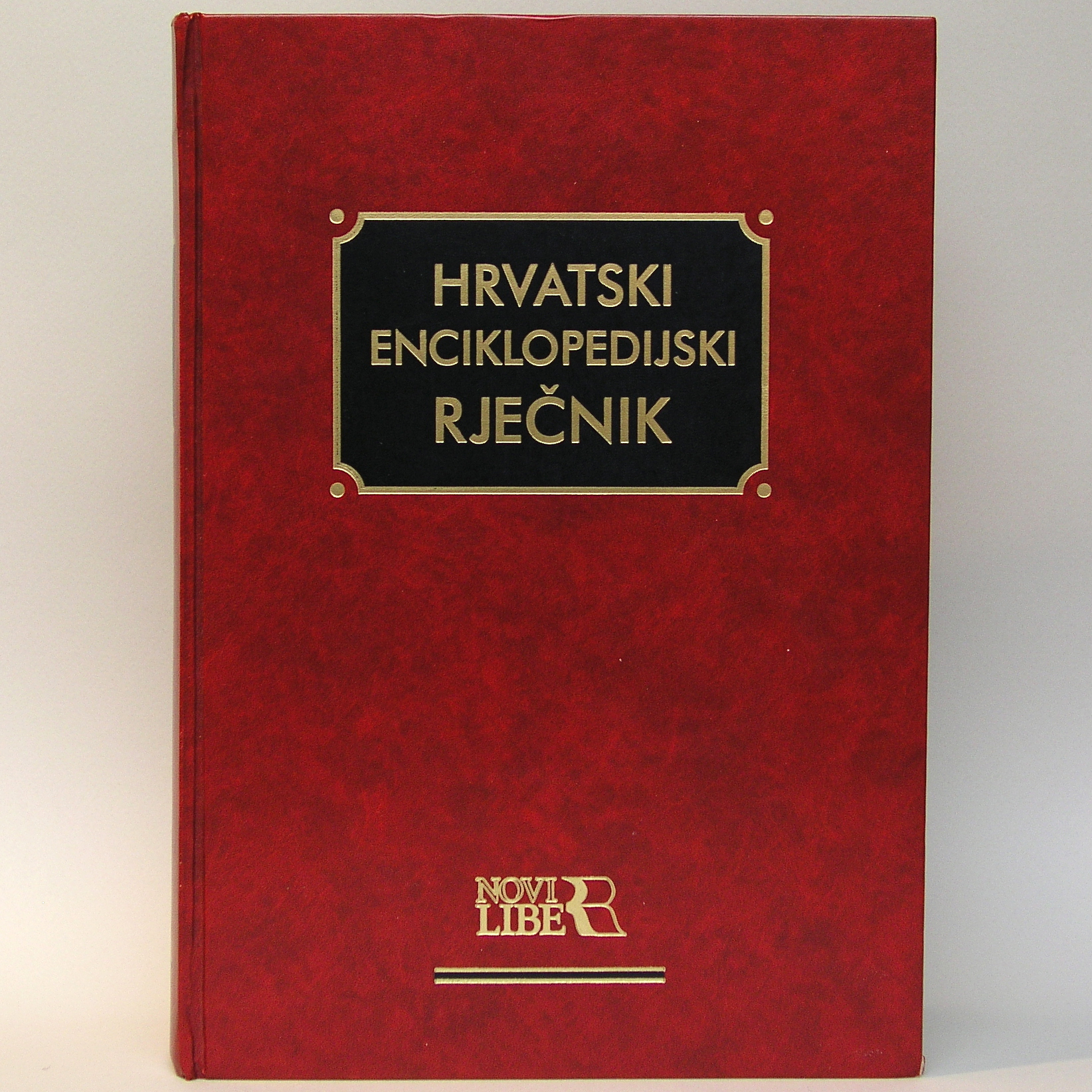
Croatian encyclopedic dictionary

Croatian Encyclopedic Dictionary (Croatian: Hrvatski enciklopedijski rječnik) is a dictionary of Croatian published in 2002 as one-volume edition by Novi Liber. Second edition of the dictionary in twelve volumes was published in 2004 by the Novi Liber and Hanza Media. Chief editors of the dictionary are Ljiljana Jojić and Ranko Matasović, while the authors are Vladimir Anić, Dunja Brozović-Rončević, Ivo Goldstein, Slavko Goldstein and Ivo Pranjković. In addition, there are twenty-three associates.

== Description ==
The dictionary contains 175,000 processed terms of which 47,000 are Croatian names, family names and places of their distribution, and 18,000 processed names in geography, history, mythology and general culture.

A group of authors and assistants worked on the preparation of the Dictionary from 1999 until 2002. Their main source materials were Vladimir Anić's Croatian Dictionary (1st edition in 1991, then two expanded editions in 1994 and 1998), Dictionary of Foreign Words by Vladimir Anić and Ivo Goldstein (1st edition in 1999, 2nd revised in 2000) and Croatian National Corpus.

The concept of the Dictionary is highly descriptive because authors aim was to collect and lexicographically process contemporary Croatian, and not to rewrite what words should be considered as standard. However, prescriptive elements cannot be completely avoided in any dictionary.

== Volumes ==
Volumes of the 2nd edition of the Croatian Encyclopedic Dictionary
Volume	Letters	Year of publication	Number of pages	ISBN
1.	A – Bez	2004	LXXXIII (83) + 296	9789536045297
2.	Bež – Dog	2004	382	9789536045310
3.	Doh – Gra	2004	382	9789536045327
4.	Gra – J	2004	381	9789536045334
5.	K – Ln	2004	381	9789536045341
6.	Lo – Ner	2004	381	9789536045358
7.	Nes – Per	2004	334	9789536045365
8.	Pes – Pro	2004	332	9789536045372
9.	Pro – Silj	2005	333	9789536045389
10.	Sim – Tap	2005	333	9789536045396
11.	Tar – Viš	2005	333	9789536045402
12.	Vit – Ž	2005	335	9789536045419
13.	Pravopisni priručnik (Spelling manual)	2004	188	9536045303

Croatian Encyclopedic Dictionary in its 2nd edition bears the ISBN 953-6045-28-1. The first volume has 83 introductory pages marked with Roman numerals. Last, 12th volume, contains supplements between pages 223. and 335. The last word in the dictionary is žvrljotina (scribble). The dictionary comes with a spelling manual prepared by Ljiljana Jojić and her associates; Ljiljana Čikota, Ivo Pranjković and Vesna Zečević. The dictionary has a total of 4,286 pages, which, together with the spelling manual, totals 4,474 pages.
