= Vrhovnik =

Vrhovnik is a surname. Notable people with the surname include:

- Majda Vrhovnik (1922–1945), Slovene communist and medical student
- Matjaž Vrhovnik (born 1972), Slovene skier
- Vid Vrhovnik (born 1999), Slovene skier

== Other uses ==
- A military rank conferred by the Croatian Parliament on Franjo Tuđman in 1995, meaning 'supreme commander'
