= Poglavnik =

Title used by Ante Pavelić

Poglavnik of the Independent State of Croatia
- Standard of the Poglavnik

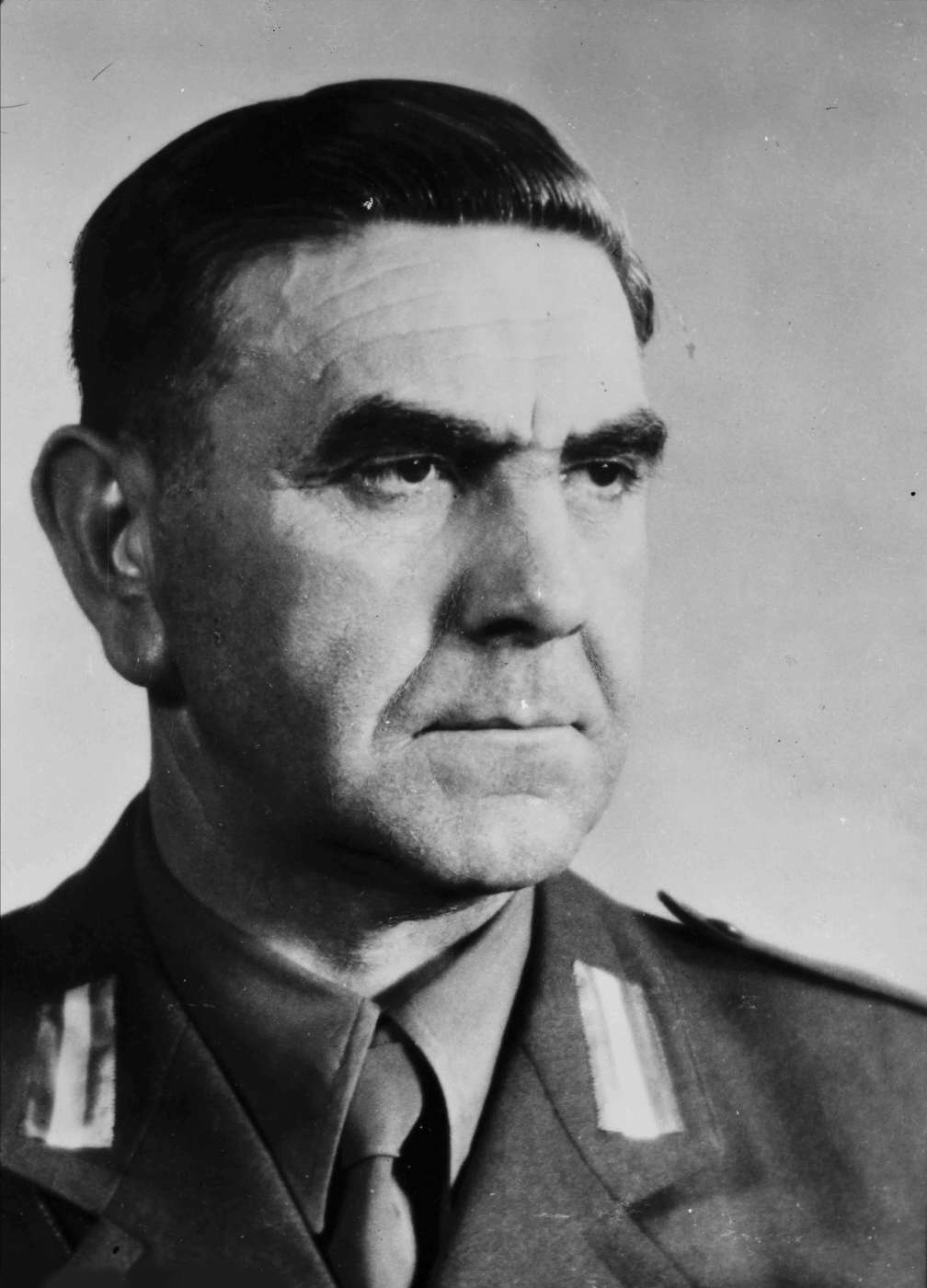
- Only officeholder Ante Pavelić; 10 April 1941 – 8 May 1945
- Government of the Independent State of Croatia
- Style: His Excellency
- Residence: Poglavnik's Palace
- Appointer: Ustaše
- Formation: 10 April 1941 (as head of government); 2 September 1943 (as head of state)
- Abolished: 8 May 1945

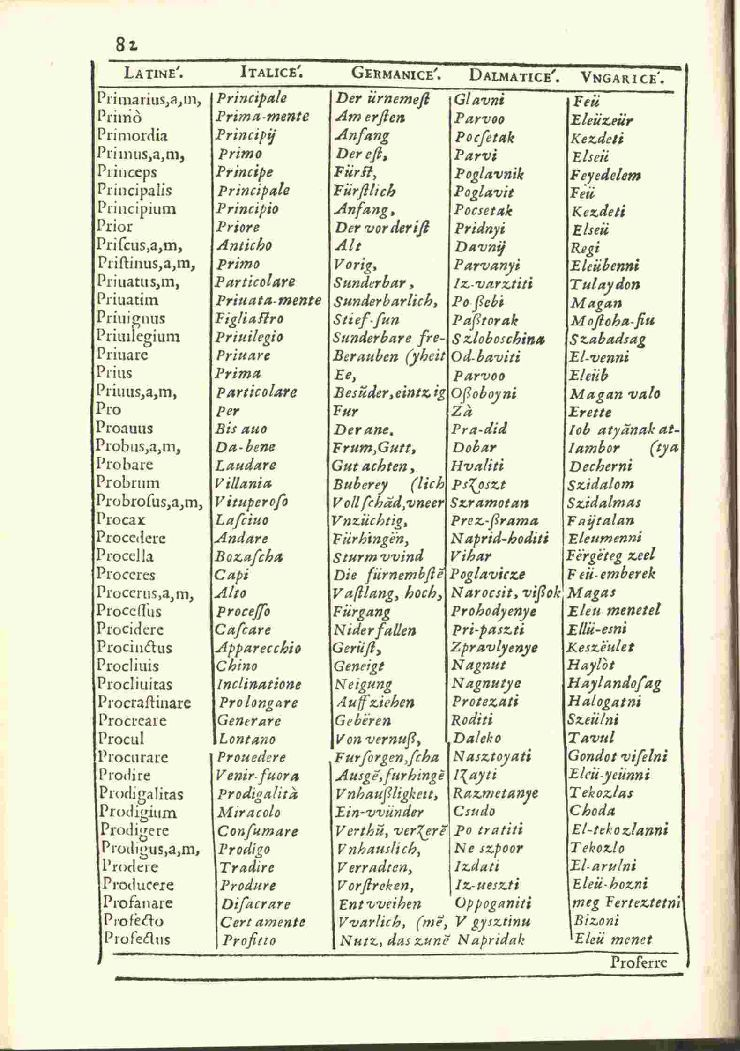
Fausto Veranzio's 1595 Dictionarium quinque linguarum lists poglavnik as a "Dalmatian" word (column 4, item 5). It is equated to Latin princeps, German Fürst and Hungarian fejedelem.

Poglavnik (Croatian: [pǒɡlaːʋniːk]) is a Croatian word meaning 'leader' or 'guide'.

As a political title, it is strongly associated with Ante Pavelić, head of the fascist organization known as the Ustaše in 1929 and served as dictator of the Independent State of Croatia, a World War II fascist puppet state built out of parts of Axis occupied Yugoslavia by the authorities of Nazi Germany and Fascist Italy, between 1941 and 1945.

== Etymology and usage ==
The word was first recorded in a 16th-century dictionary compiled by Fausto Veranzio as a Croatian term for the Latin word princeps.

According to Vladimir Anić's Rječnik hrvatskoga jezika (Croatian Dictionary) and the Croatian Encyclopedic Dictionary, the word comes from the adjective form poglavit, which can be loosely translated as 'first and foremost' or 'respectable, noble, honourable'. The adjective is in turn a compound of the Croatian prefix po- and the Proto-Slavic word stem glava 'head'.

Because it was used by the fascist regime, the title (which had originally meant "head" or "chief" but was rarely used before the 1930s) is never used today in its original sense as it became synonymous with Pavelić and took on negative connotations after World War II.

Other etymologically closely related words used in modern Croatian are "poglavar" (translated as "head of state" or "chief", used for heads of state) and "poglavica" (translated as "chief", in the sense of tribal leader).

== Political role and context ==
Ante Pavelić first began using the title of "Poglavnik" when it was prescribed as the official title for the supreme leader of the Ustaše movement in the organization's founding charter in 1930, while he was in exile in Italy. The organization (whose name at the time meant simply "rebels" in Croatian but which also lost its original meaning in modern usage), was organized as a movement which sought to create an independent Croatian nation-state by means of armed struggle at the time when Croatia was part of the Kingdom of Yugoslavia.

Following the 1941 invasion of Yugoslavia and the establishment of the puppet state called Independent State of Croatia (commonly referred to by its Croatian-language initialism NDH), the title continued to be used for Pavelić, and its meaning was taken to have evolved into "the supreme leader". The title is therefore usually compared and considered equivalent to other titles of ethno-political leadership used at the time such as Führer (used by Adolf Hitler, which was itself modeled after Benito Mussolini's title Duce). As a result, "Poglavnik" is sometimes translated as "Führer" in English-language sources.

Legally, the exact role of the person carrying the title and its function were never officially stipulated in the constitution or in any other piece of legislation passed during NDH's existence. From May 1941 to October 1943 NDH attempted to be a kingdom and Ante Pavelić de facto the country's Prime Minister. It embodied Prince Aimone, Duke of Aosta (named Tomislav II) as a head of state, though he never ruled there. Later, he refused to assume the kingship in protest of the Italian annexation of the Dalmatia region, and is therefore referred to in sources as king designate. However, other sources refer to him as King Tomislav II and the nominal head of the NDH during its first two years (1941–1943). After the dismissal of Mussolini on 25 July 1943, Aimone abdicated on 31 July as king on the orders of Victor Emmanuel III.

Following Italy's exit from World War II in September 1943, Pavelić took on the role equivalent to head of state, while Nikola Mandić was officially appointed Prime Minister of NDH. Thus, from September 1943 until the state's dissolution on 8 May 1945, the title can be taken to mean Head of State.

Regardless of the official role of the title, Pavelić had unlimited authority to pass decrees and appoint government ministers throughout the existence of NDH. Since the state ceased to exist in 1945, the title was never claimed by any successor. It continued to be used informally as a nickname for Pavelić during his post-war exile until his death in Madrid in 1959, and has become synonymous with him ever since.

== See also ==
- Vrhovnik – title of similar connotation in Croatian, associated with Franjo Tuđman, the first president of post-Yugoslav Croatia
- Führer – title of similar connotation in German, associated with Nazi Germany
- Duce – title of similar connotation in Italian, associated with Fascist Italy
- Conducător – title of similar connotation in Romanian, associated with Kingdom of Romania
- Caudillo – title of similar connotation in Spanish
