= Istanbul Naval Museum =

Coordinates: 41°02′30″N 29°00′20″E

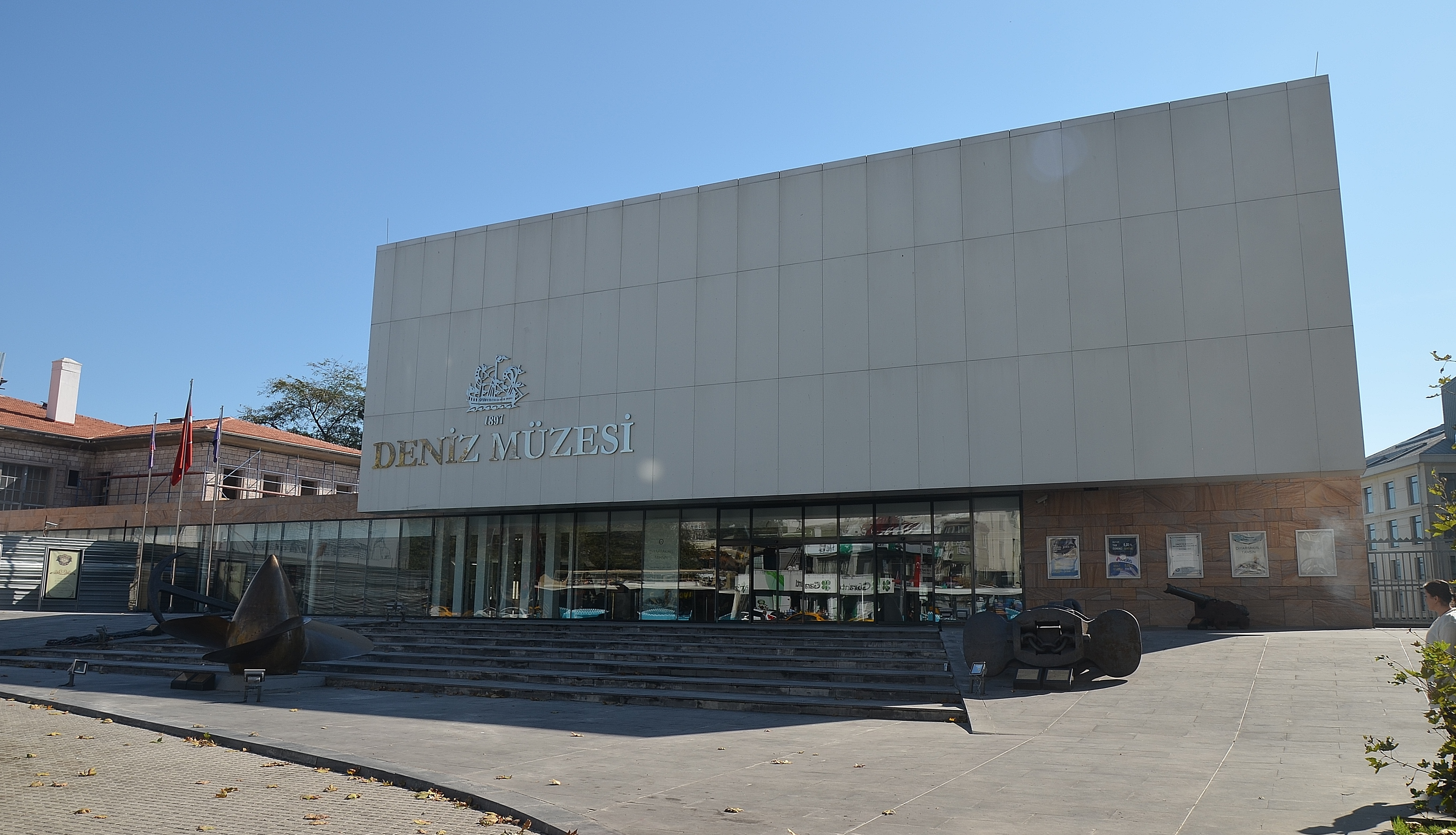
- Istanbul Naval Museum
- Established: 1897; 129 years ago
- Location: Hayrettin İskelesi Sok. 80690 Beşiktaş, Istanbul, Turkey
- Type: Naval museum
- Website: denizmuzesi.dzkk.tsk.tr/en

The Istanbul Naval Museum (Turkish: İstanbul Deniz Müzesi) is a national naval museum, located in the Beşiktaş district of Istanbul, Turkey. It was established in 1897 by the Ottoman Minister of the Navy (Bahriye Nazırı) Bozcaadalı Hasan Hüsnü Pasha.

The museum contains an important collection of military artifacts pertaining to the Ottoman Navy. In the maritime field, it is Turkey's largest museum, with a great variety of collections. Around 20,000 pieces are present in its collection, including the late 16th or early 17th century Ottoman galley known as Tarihi Kadırga, built in the period between the reigns of Sultan Murad III (1574–1595) and Sultan Mehmed IV (1648–1687), as evidenced by AMS radiocarbon dating and dendrochronological research. She is the only surviving original galley in the world, and has the world's oldest continuously maintained wooden hull.

Being connected to the Turkish Naval Forces Command, it is also the country's first military museum.

In the early 21st century a new exhibition building was constructed. The construction began in 2008, and the building was reopened on October 4, 2013. It has two floors above ground level and one basement floor, all covering 20,000 m^{2} (220,000 sq ft).

The basement consists of diverse items like figureheads, ornaments of naval ships, ship models, and pieces of the Byzantine chain that was used for blocking the entrance of the Golden Horn during the Ottoman conquest of Constantinople (Istanbul) in 1453. In the first and second floors, a large number of imperial and other caïques are exhibited.

Many exhibition items underwent special restoration and conservation works due to deformation of the raw materials caused by heat, light, humidity, atmospheric conditions, vandalism and other factors.

== Access ==
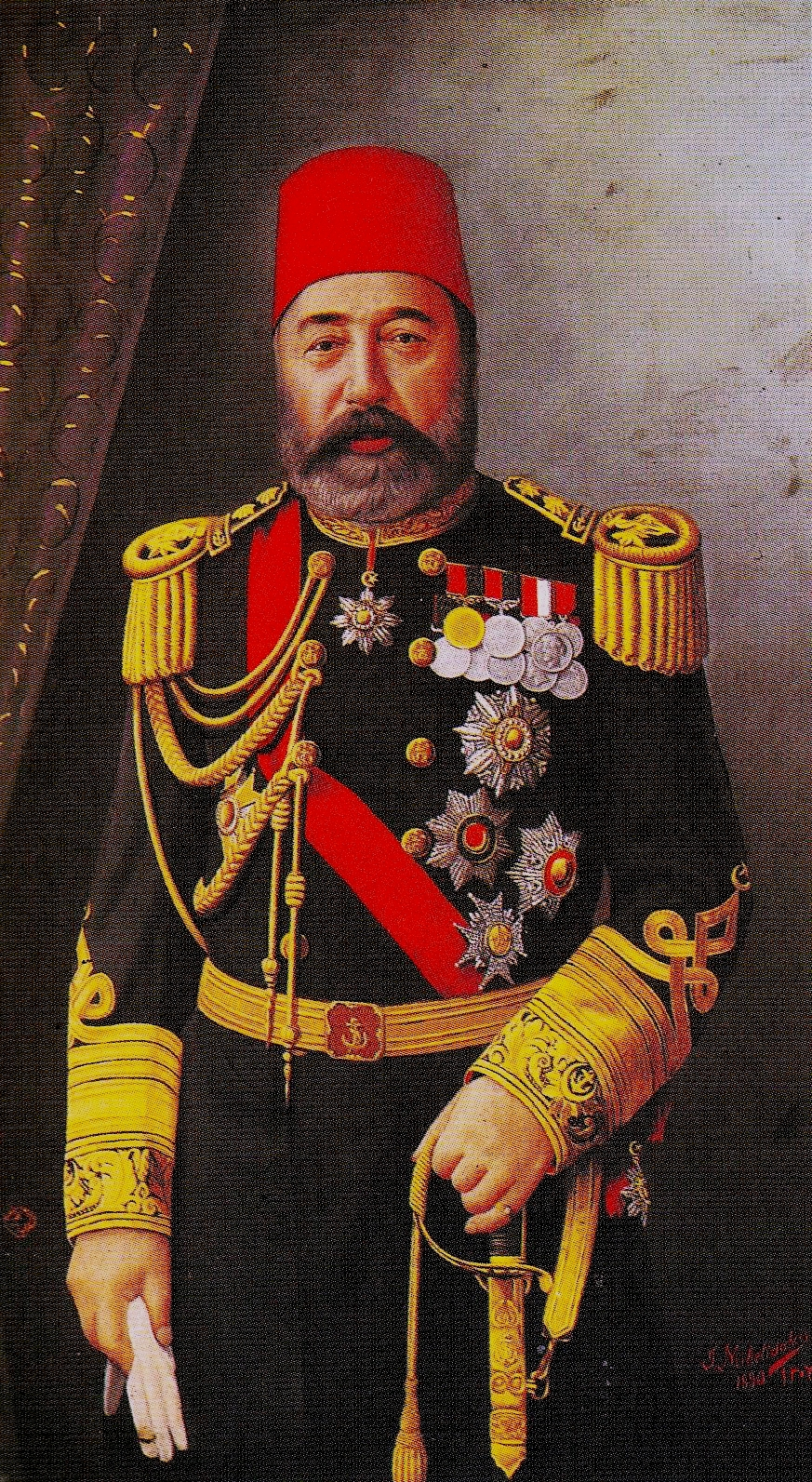
Minister of the Ottoman Navy (Bahriye Nazırı) Bozcaadalı Hasan Hüsnü Pasha established the Istanbul Naval Museum (İstanbul Deniz Müzesi) in 1897.

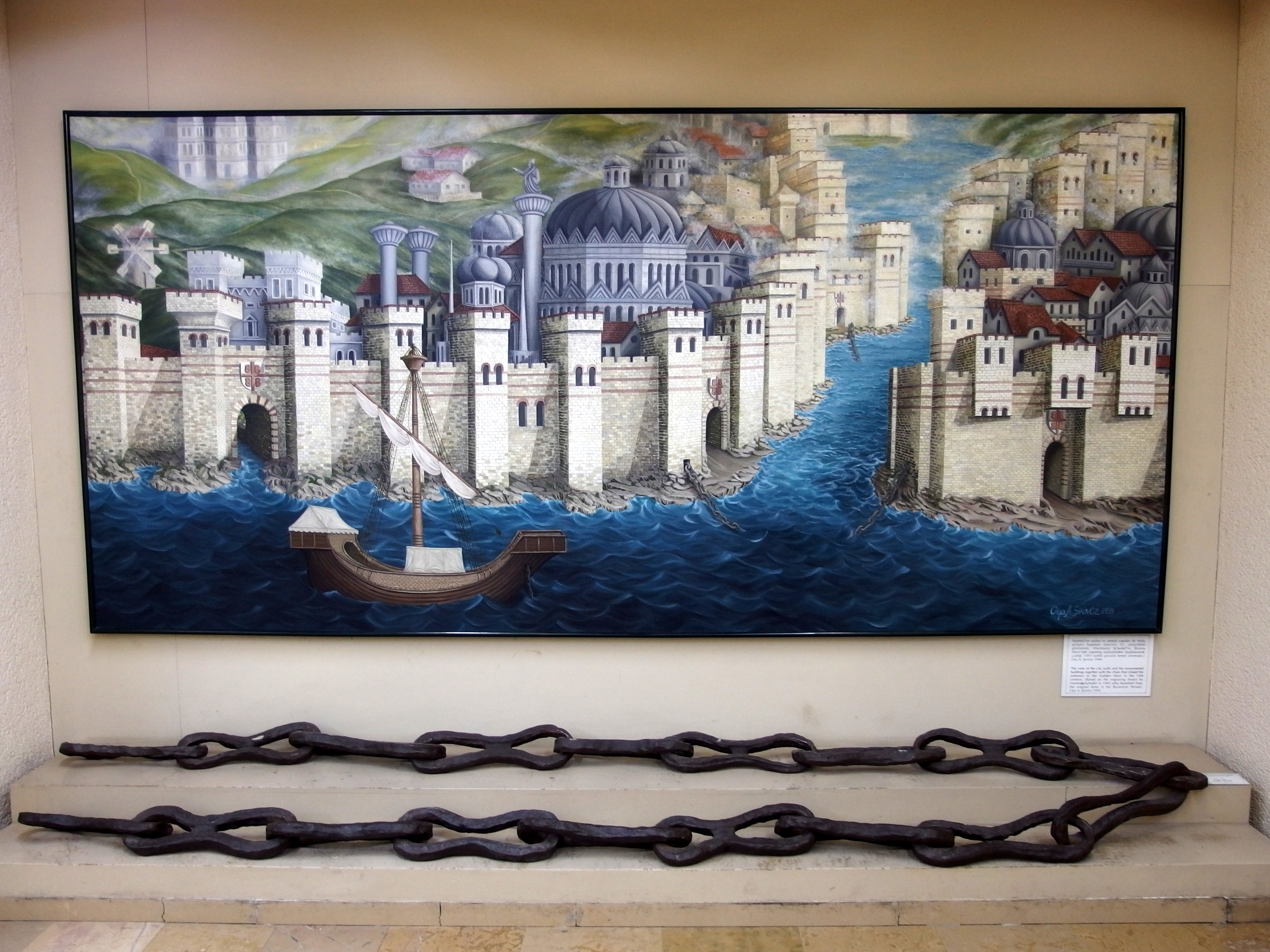
Fragment of the Byzantine chain that closed the entrance of the Golden Horn during the Fall of Constantinople in 1453

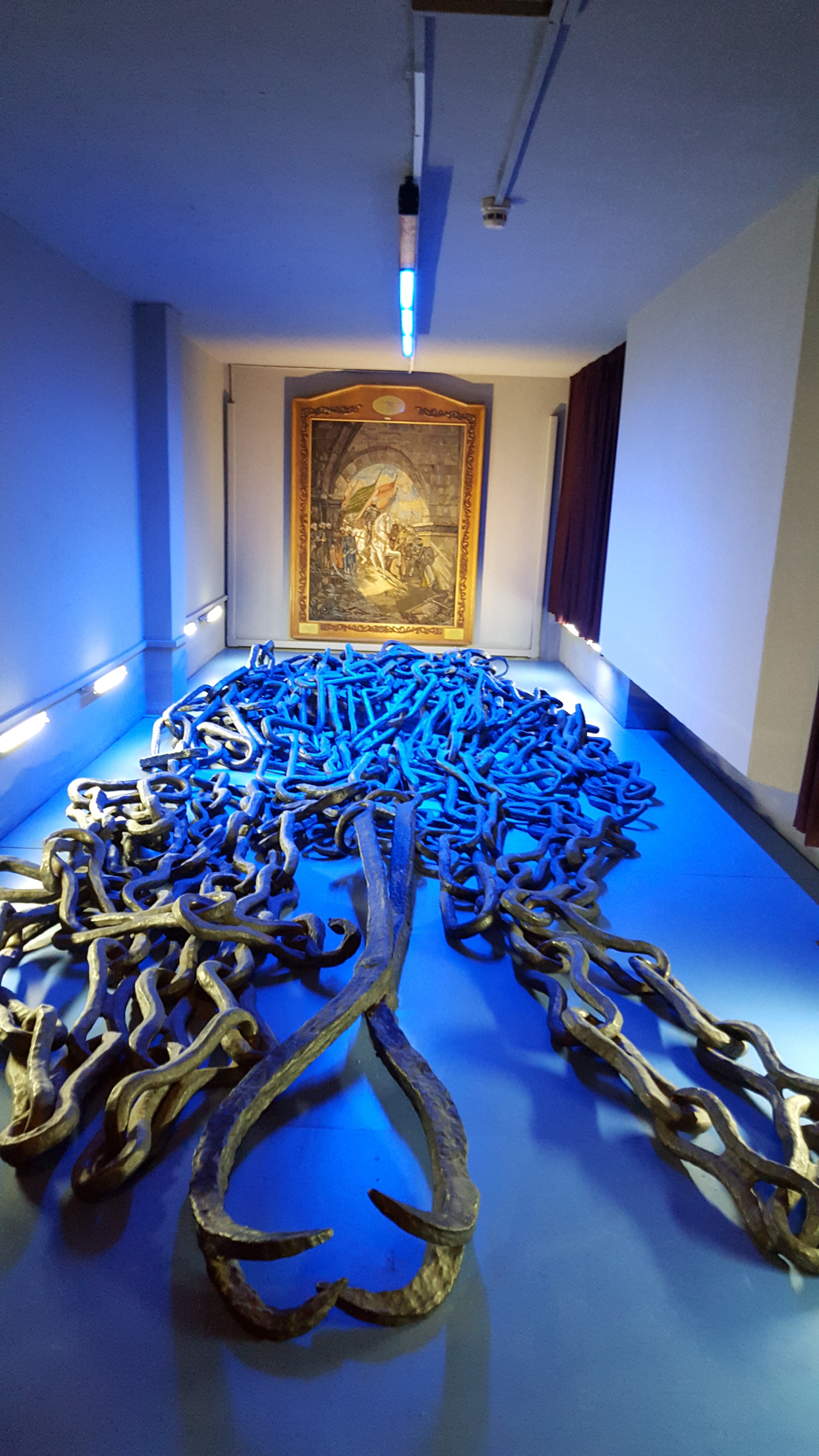
The Byzantine chain that closed the entrance of the Golden Horn during the Fall of Constantinople in 1453, with the original portrait depicting Mehmed the Conqueror's triumphant entry into Constantinople by Hasan Rıza (later re-interpreted by Fausto Zonaro, whose version is at the nearby Dolmabahçe Palace) seen in the background.

The museum is located on Hayrettin İskelesi Street in Beşiktaş, Istanbul, near the Beşiktaş ferry pier for the Beşiktaş-Kadıköy line. The museum is open every day between 09:00 and 17:00, except for Mondays, New Year's Day and the first day of religious holidays.

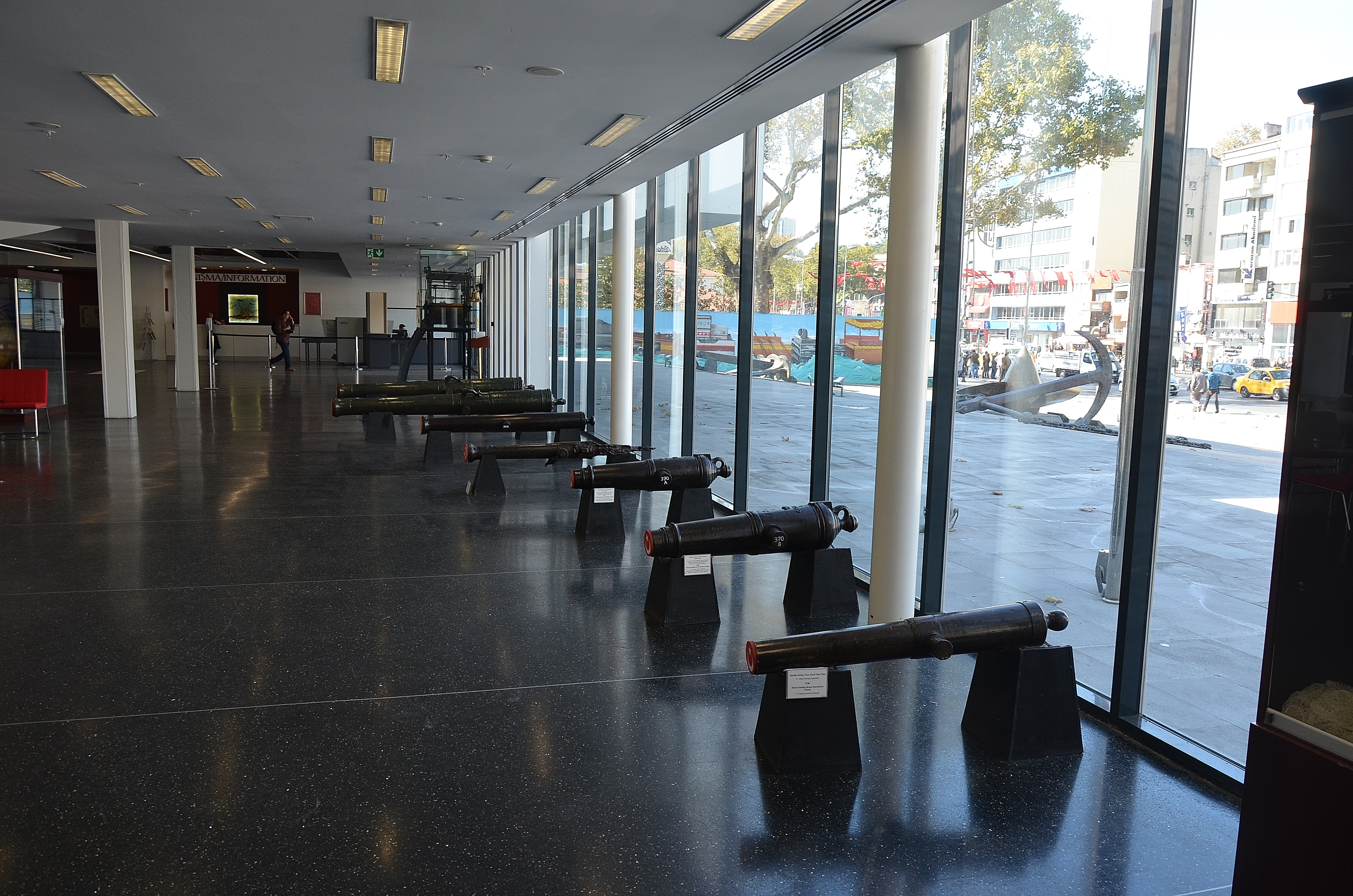
Naval cannons in the foyer

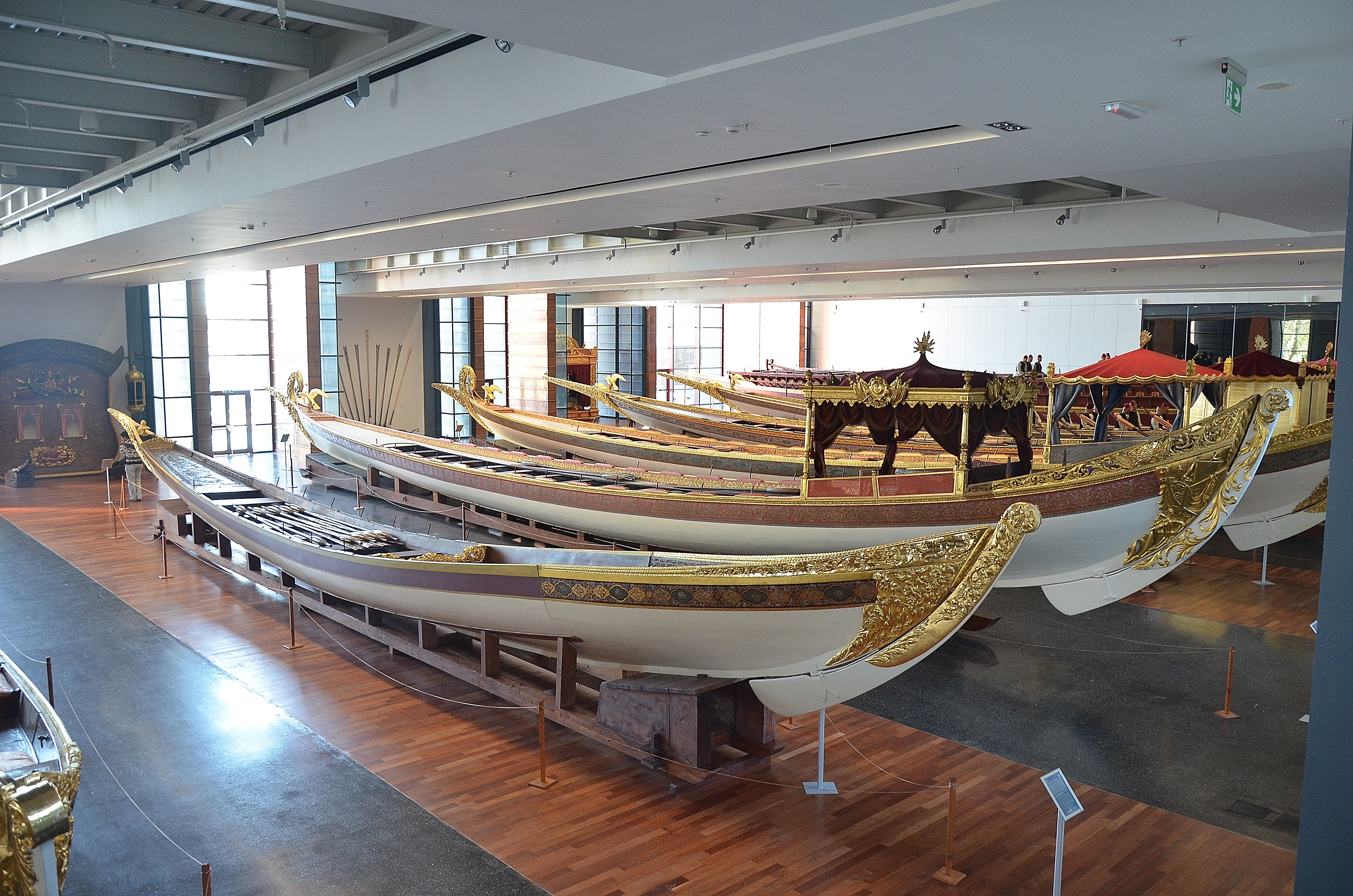
Imperial caïques

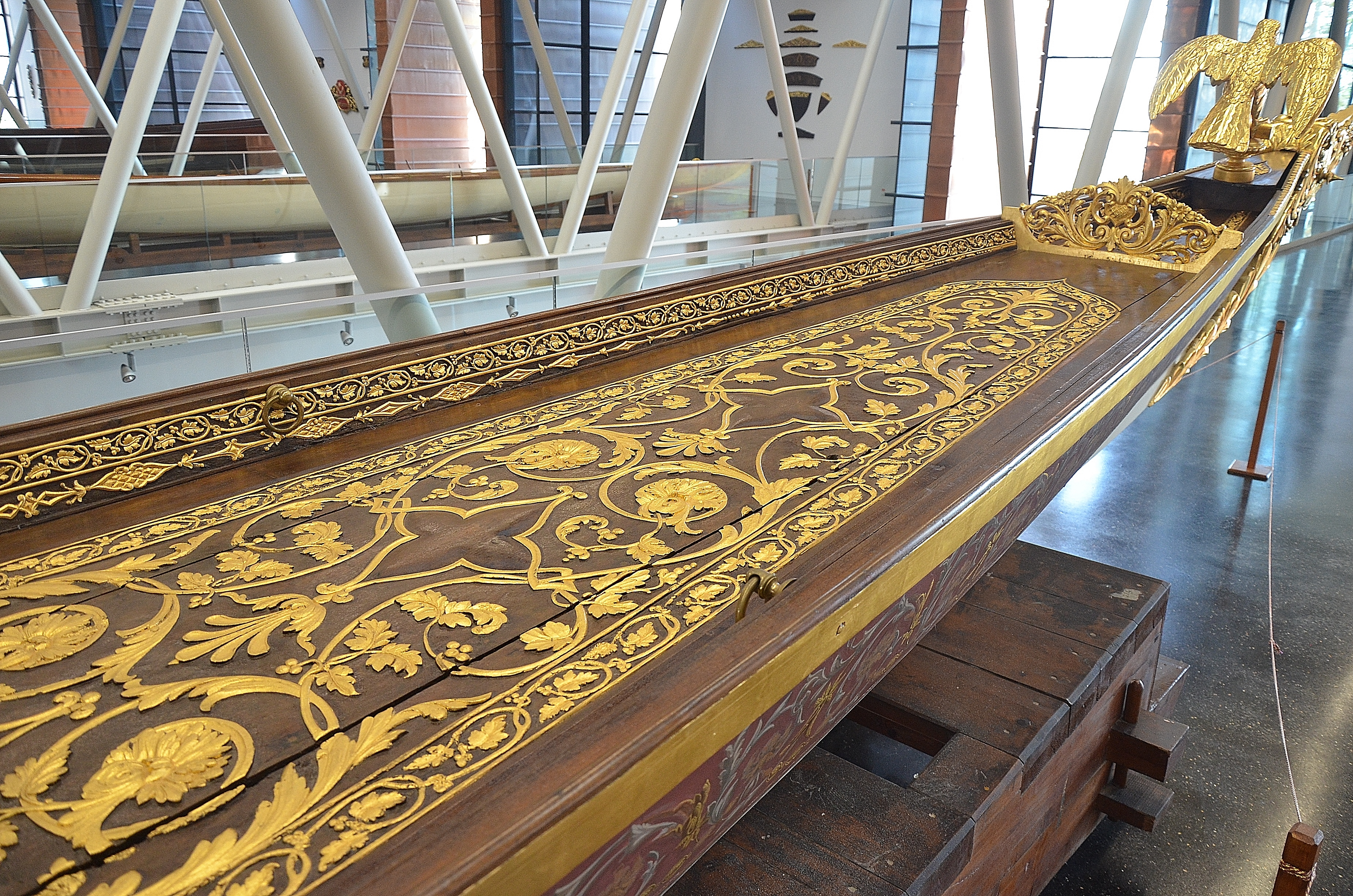
Bow ornaments of an imperial caïque

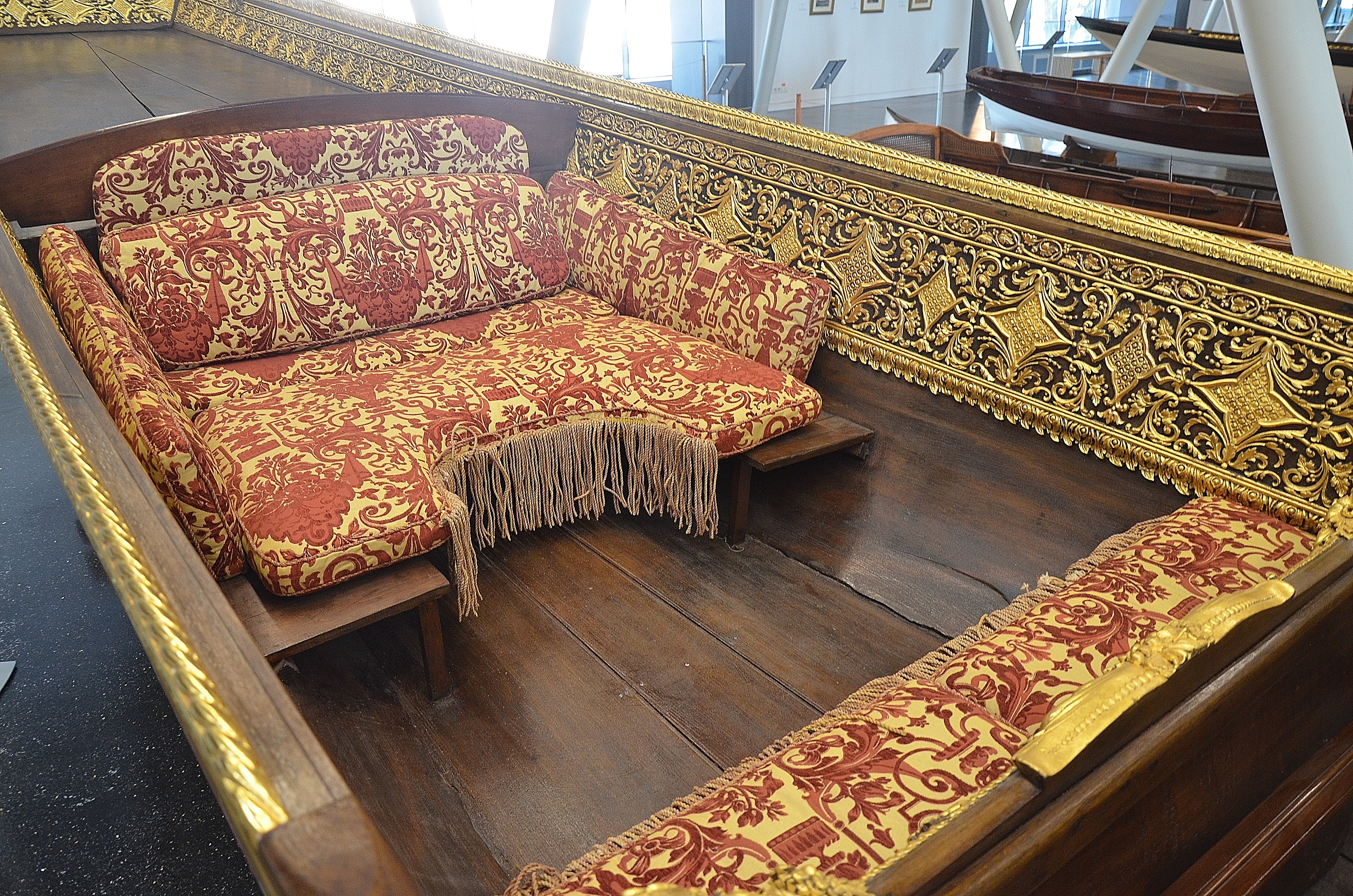
Stern ornaments of an imperial caïque

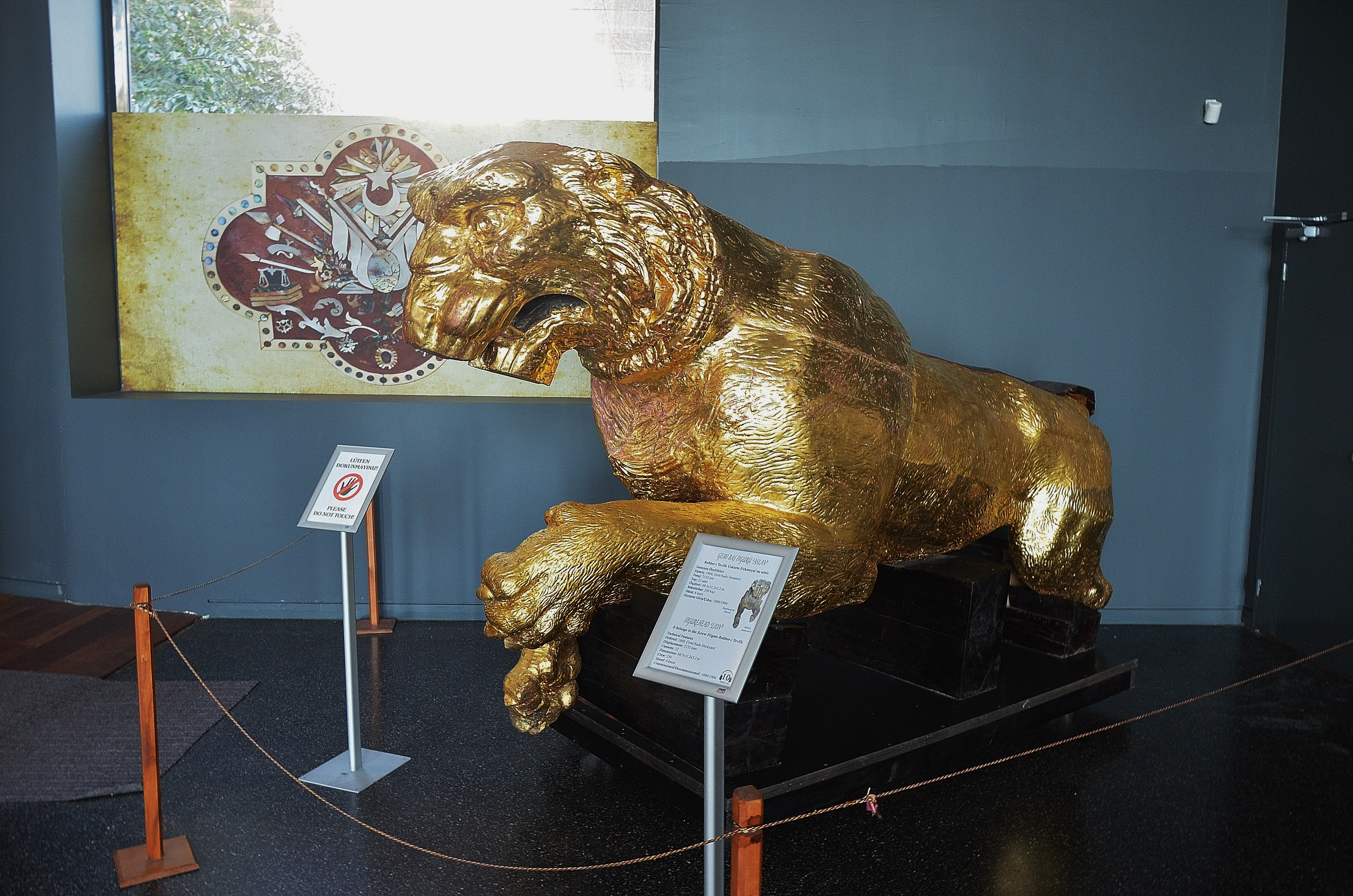
Ottoman ship figurehead lion

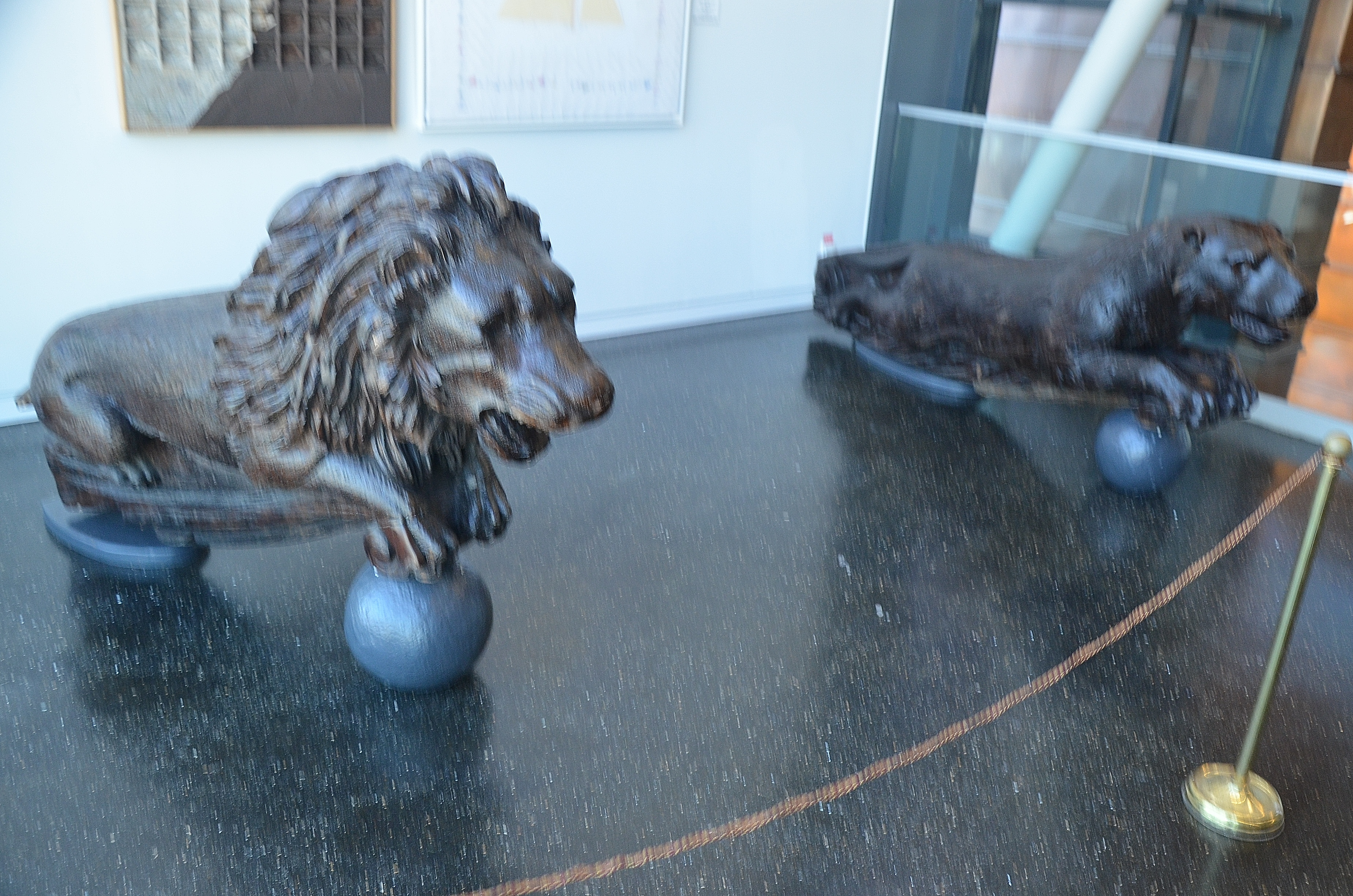
Ottoman ship figurehead lions

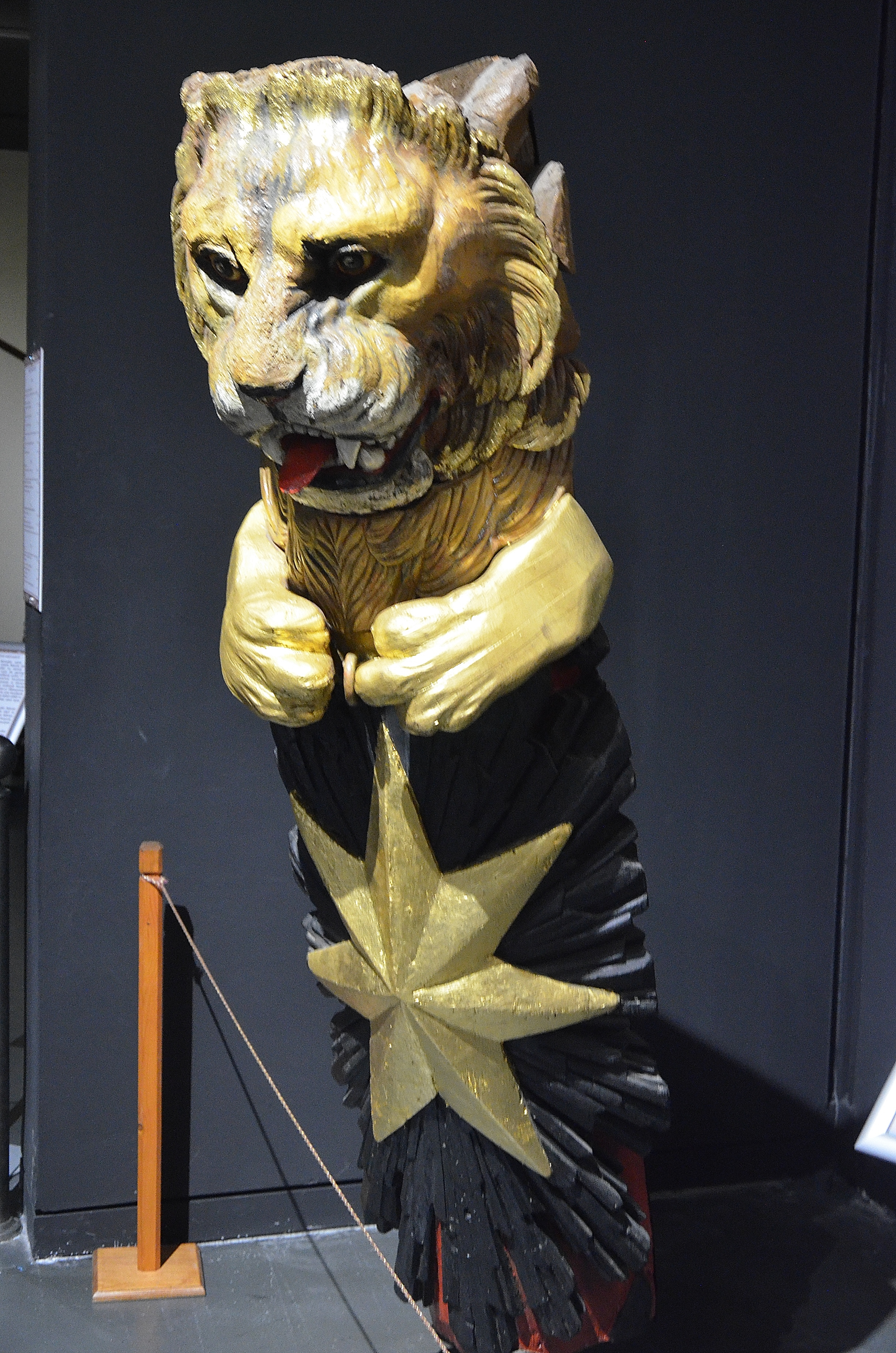
Ottoman ship figurehead lion

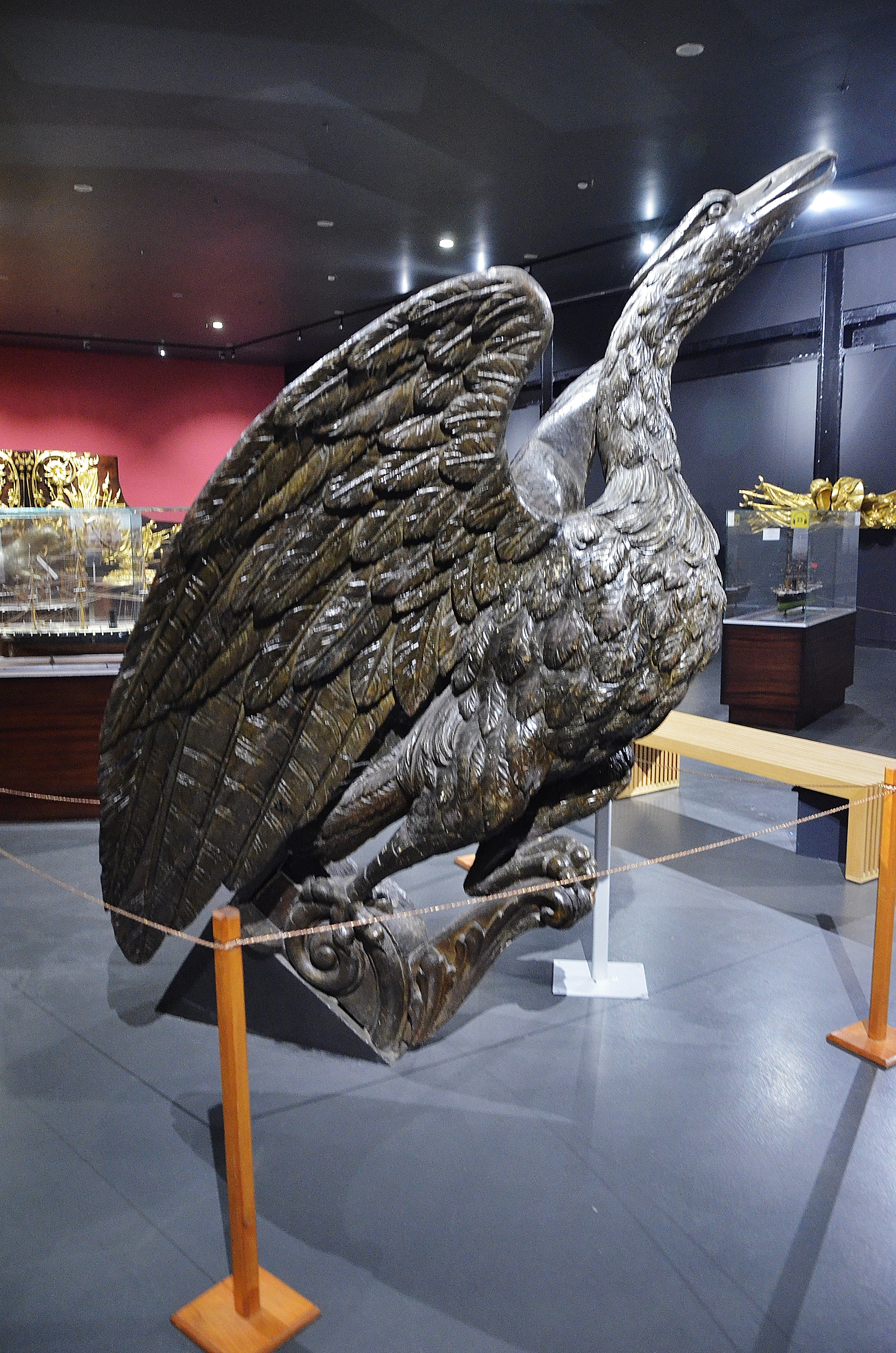
Ottoman ship figurehead

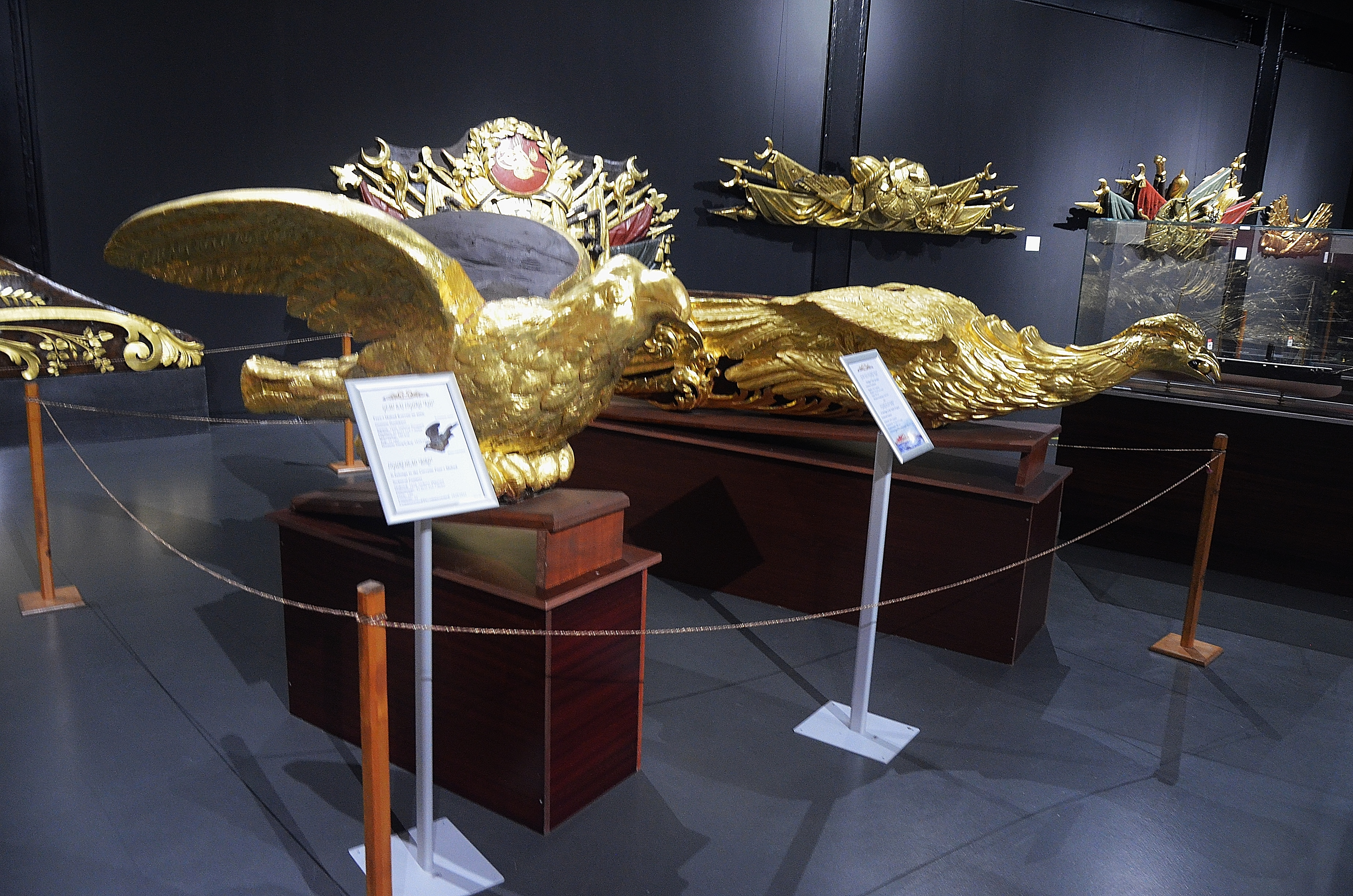
Ottoman ship figureheads

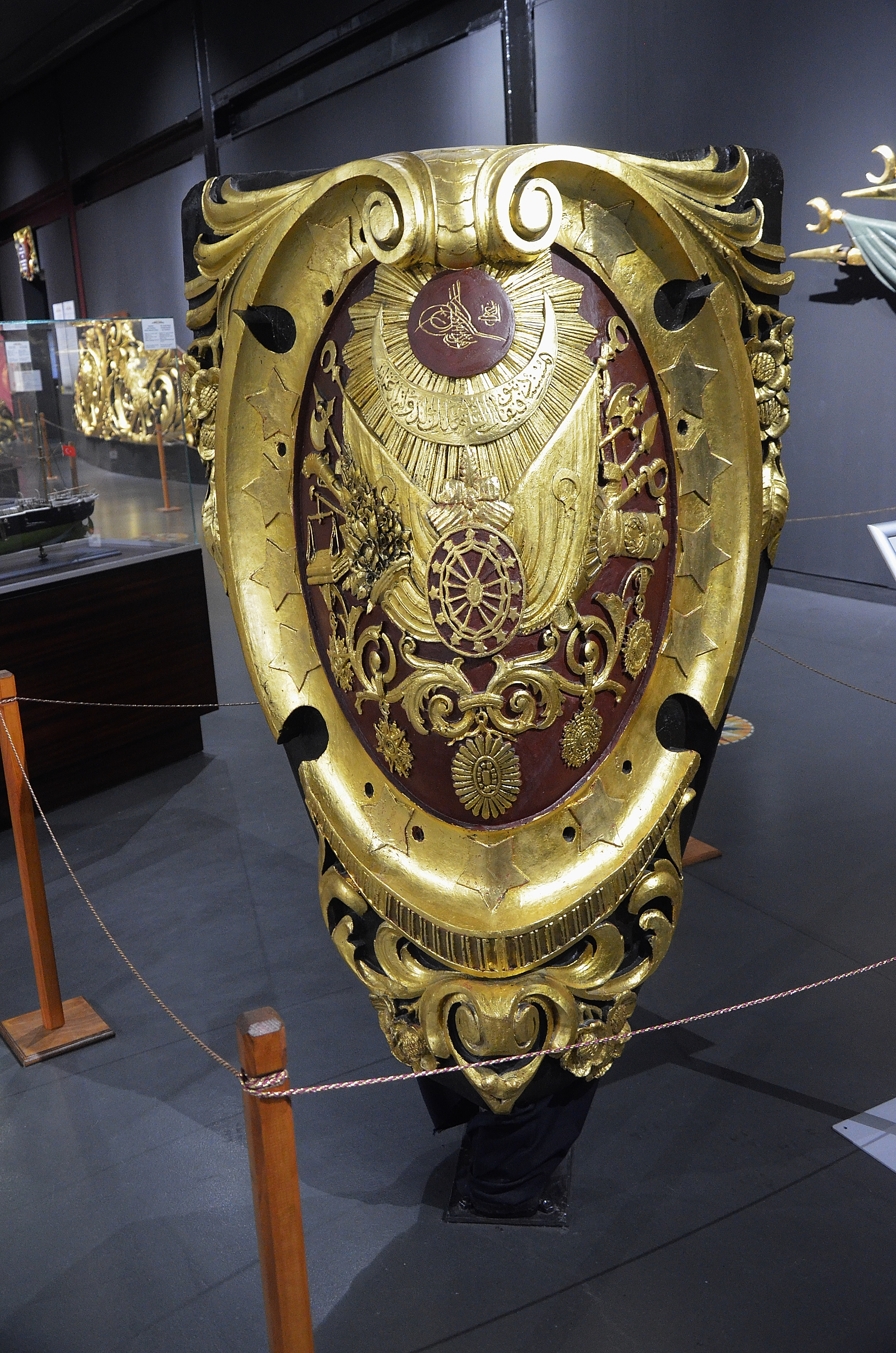
Ottoman ship ornament

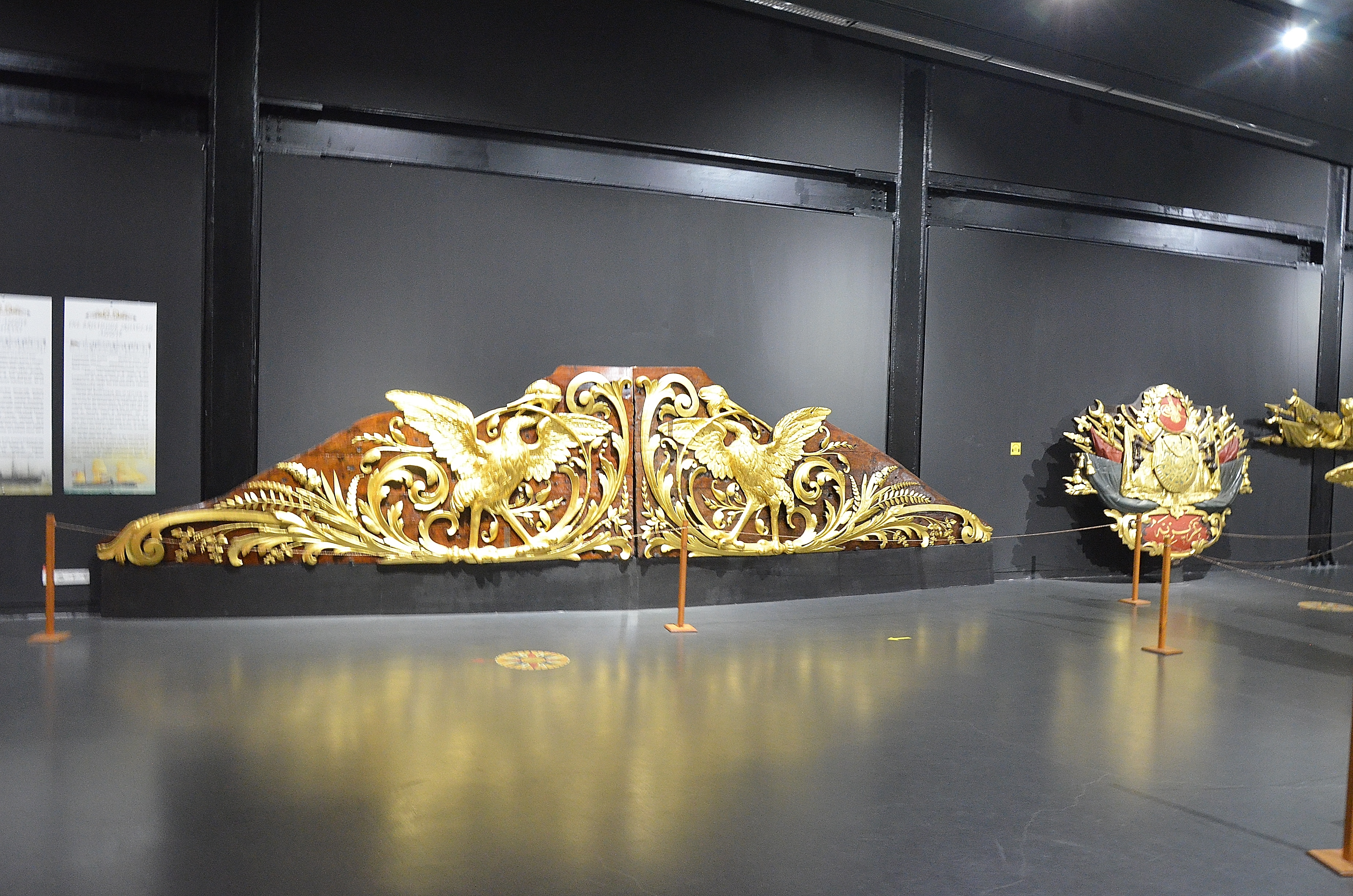
Ottoman ship ornaments

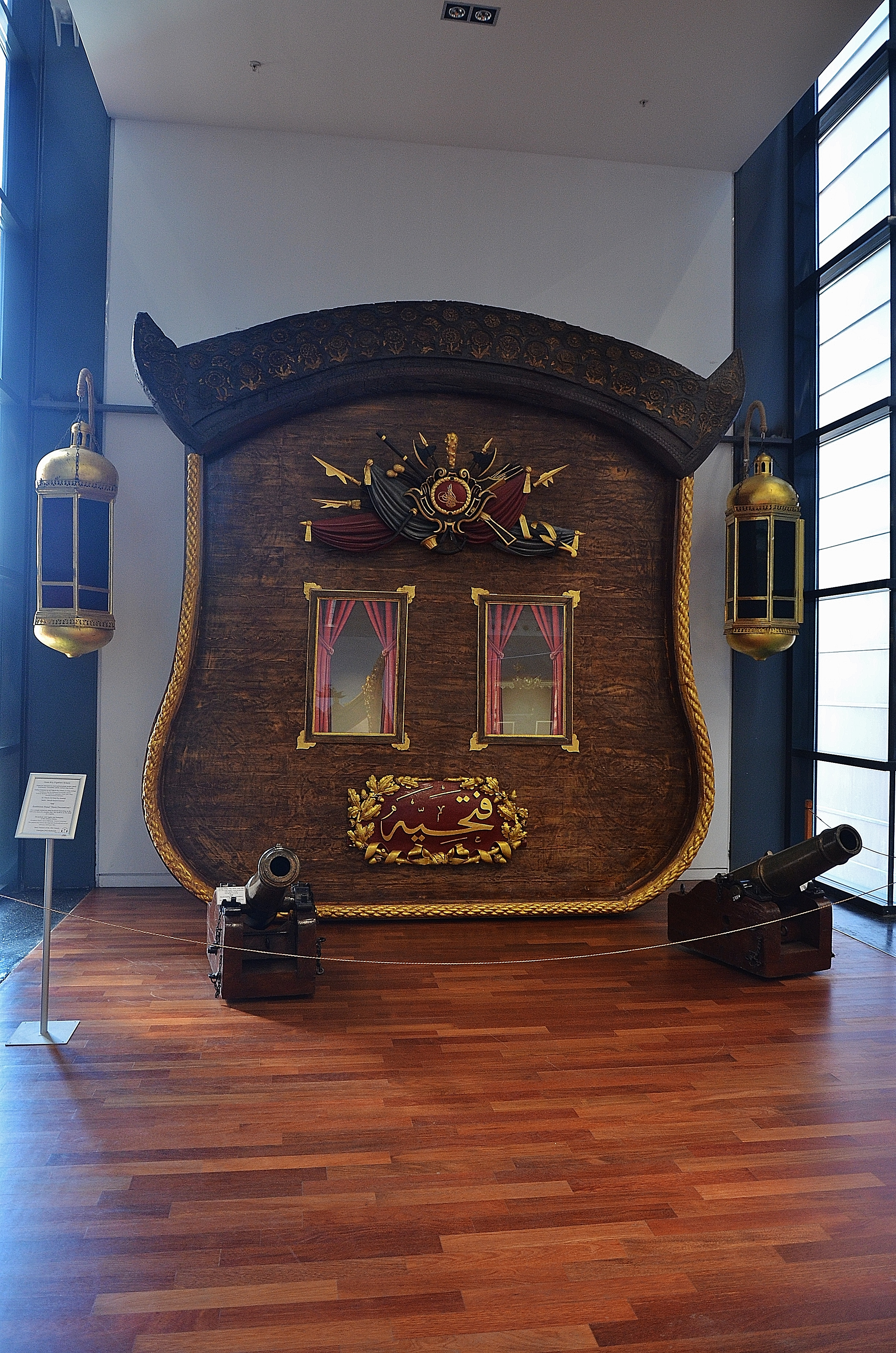
Ottoman ship ornament

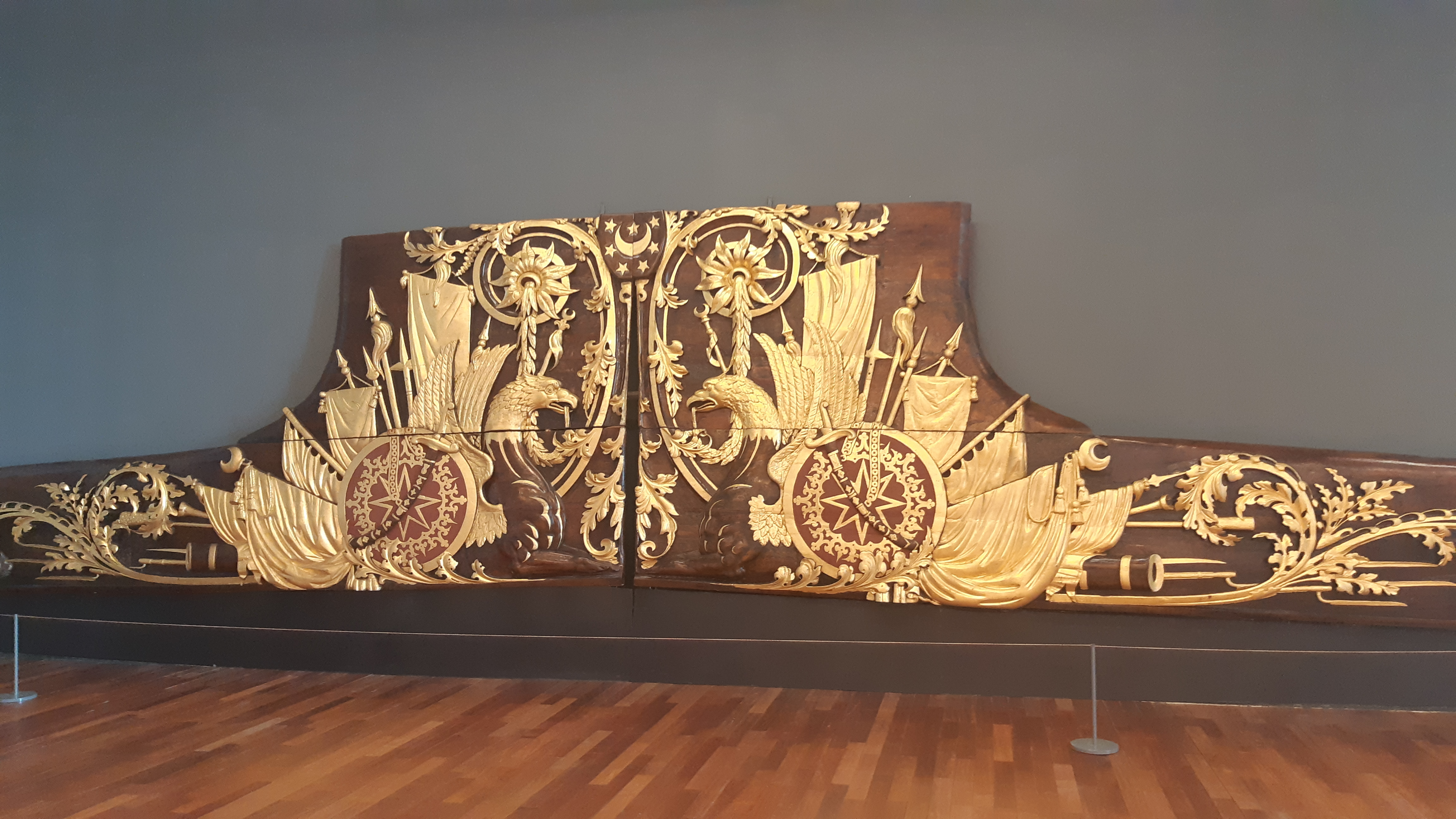
Broadside ornament of the Ottoman ironclad Orhaniye

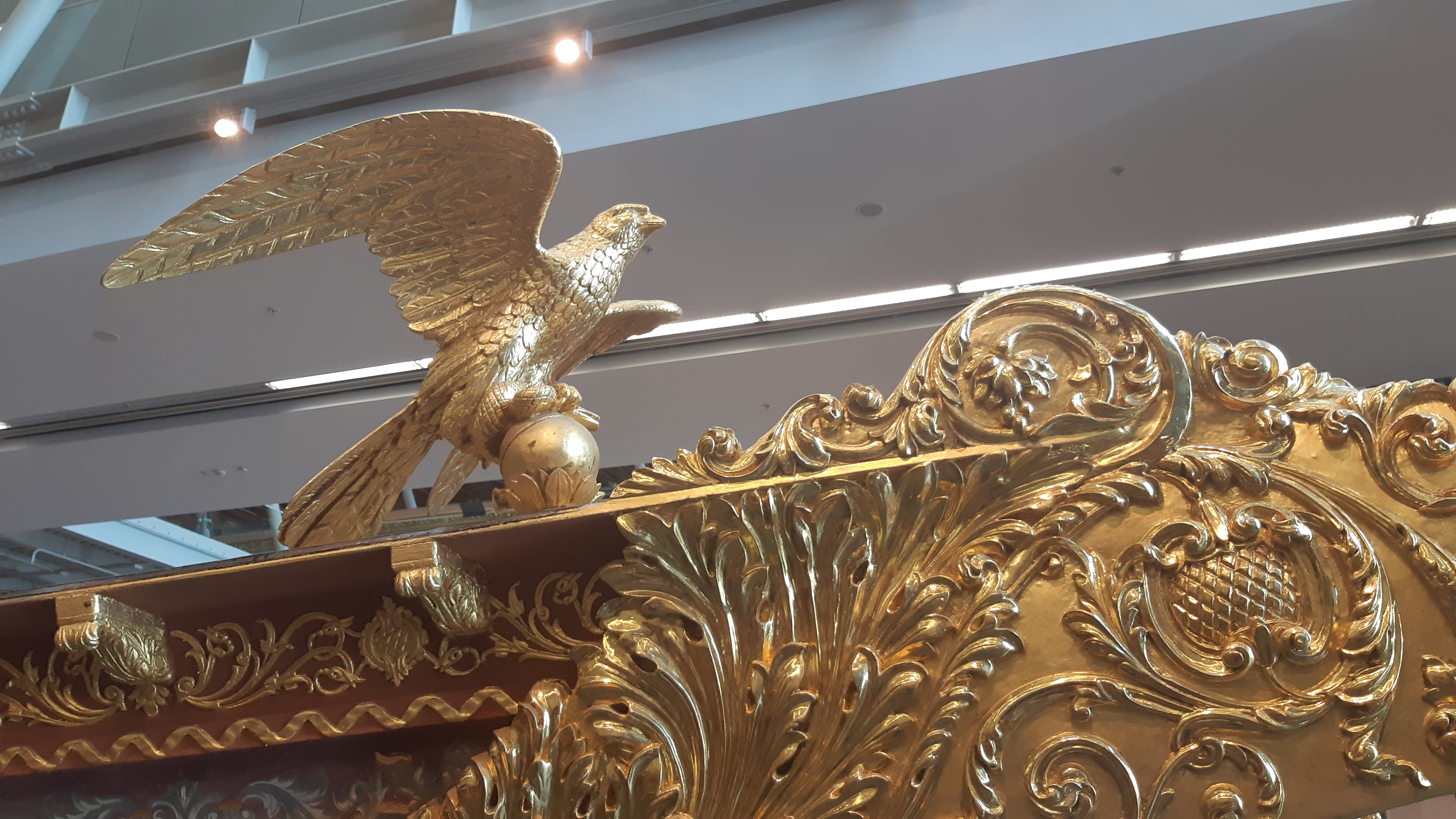
Ornament of an imperial caique

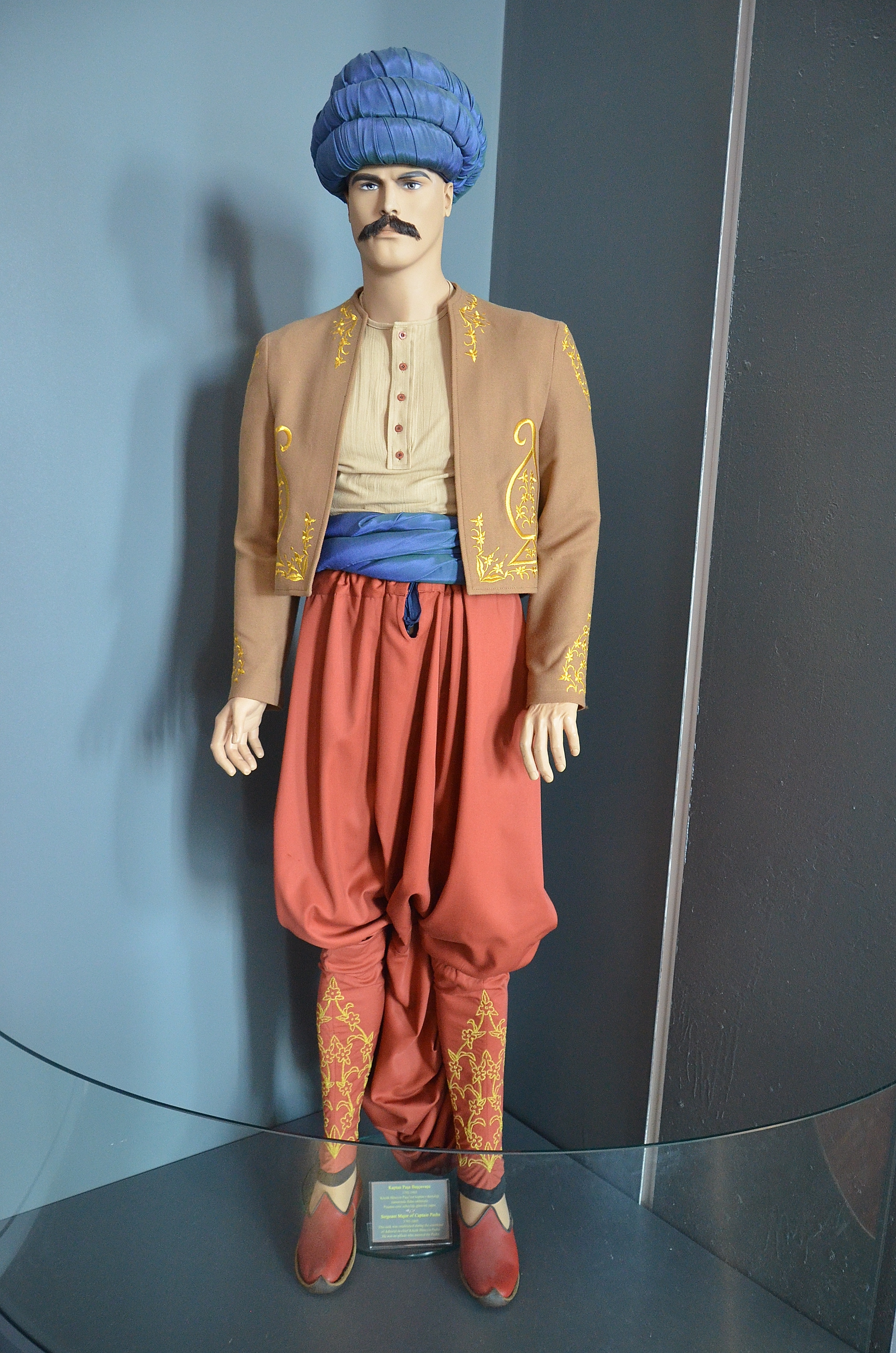
Sergeant major of Captain Pasha, Ottoman Navy

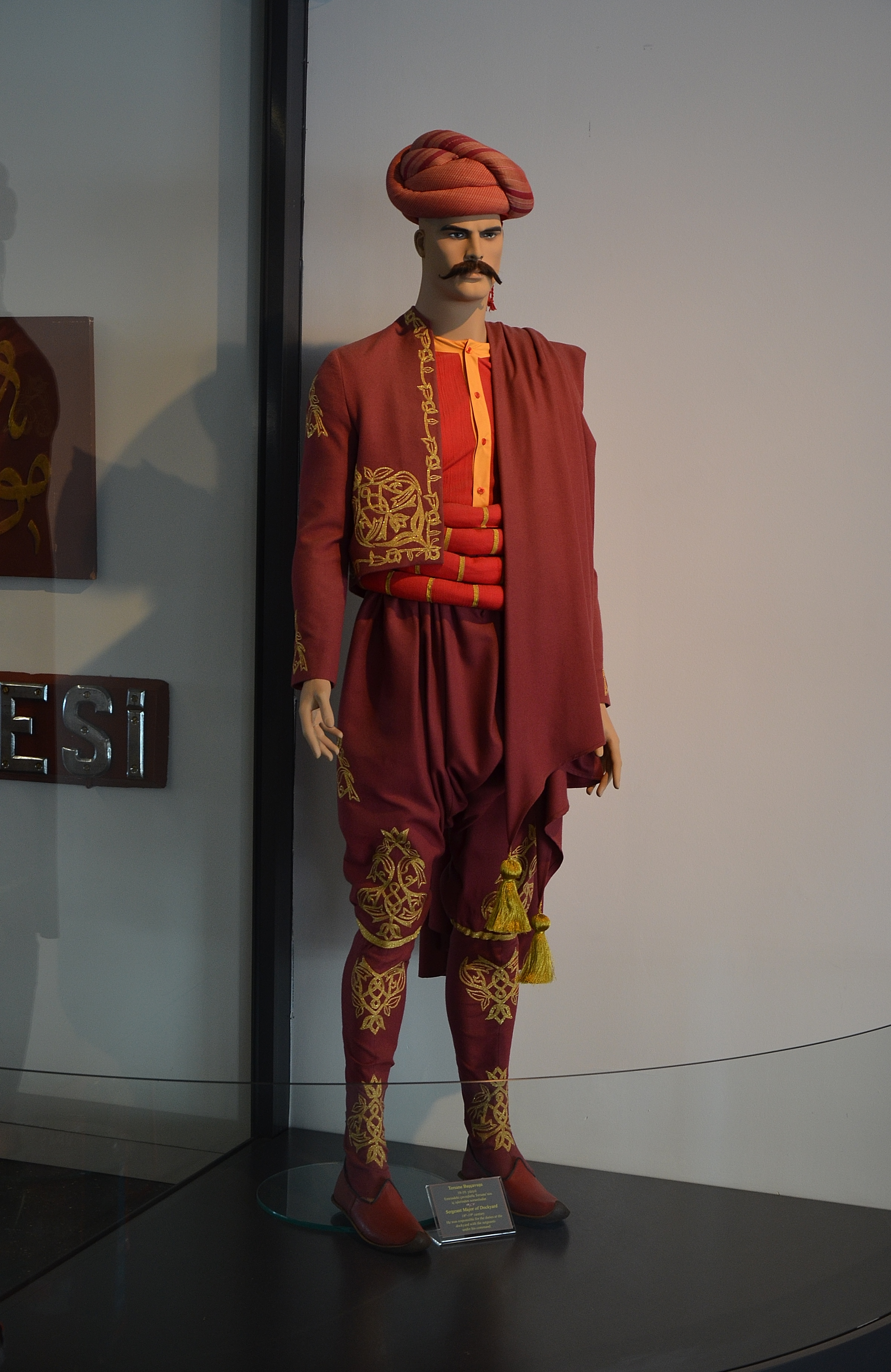
Sergeant major of the Dockyard, Ottoman Navy

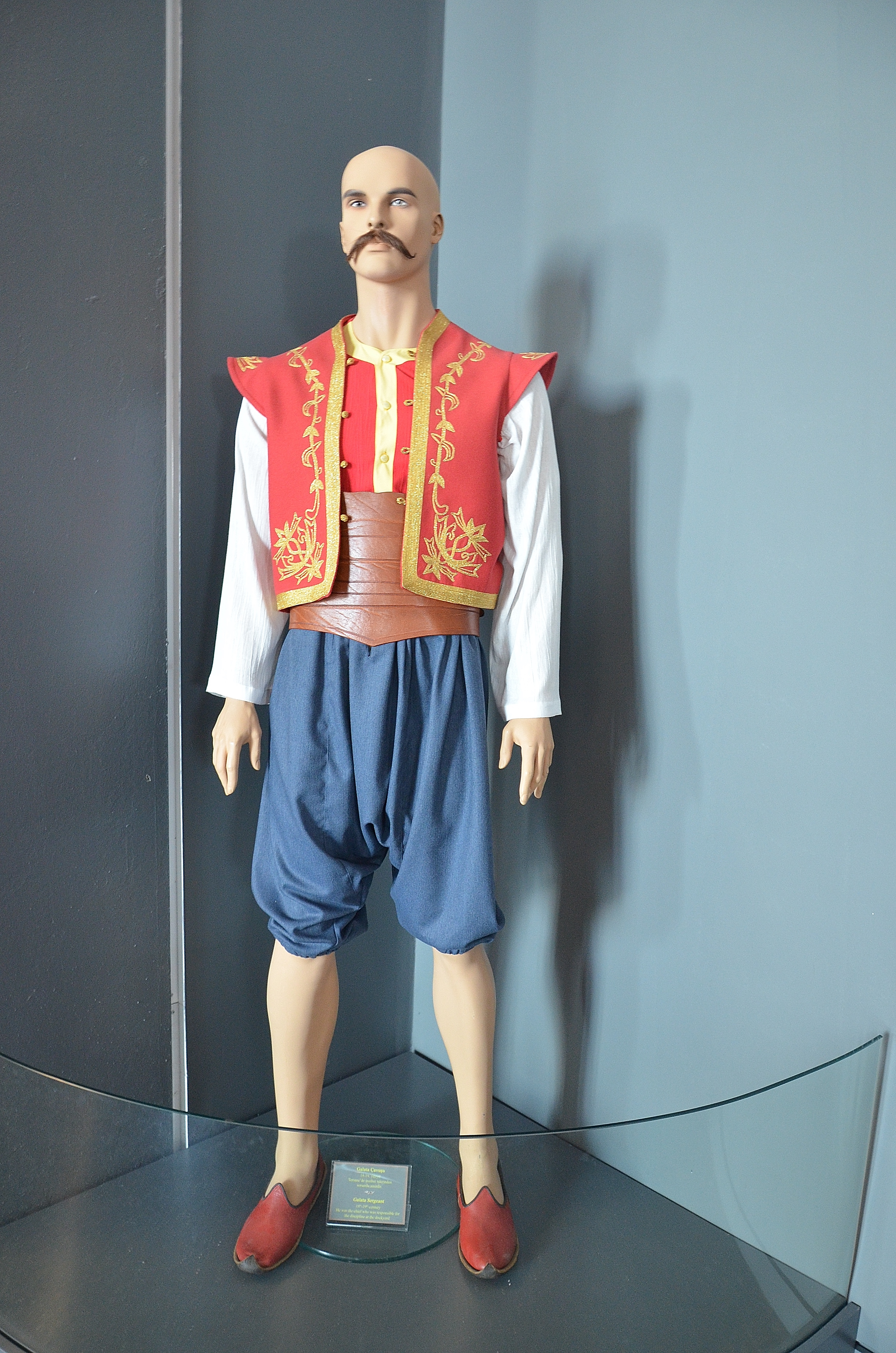
Galata Sergeant, Ottoman Navy

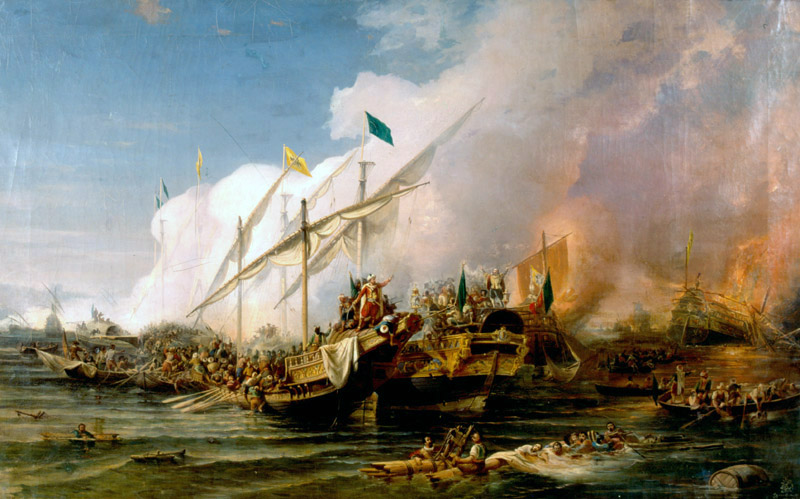
Painting of the Battle of Preveza (1538)

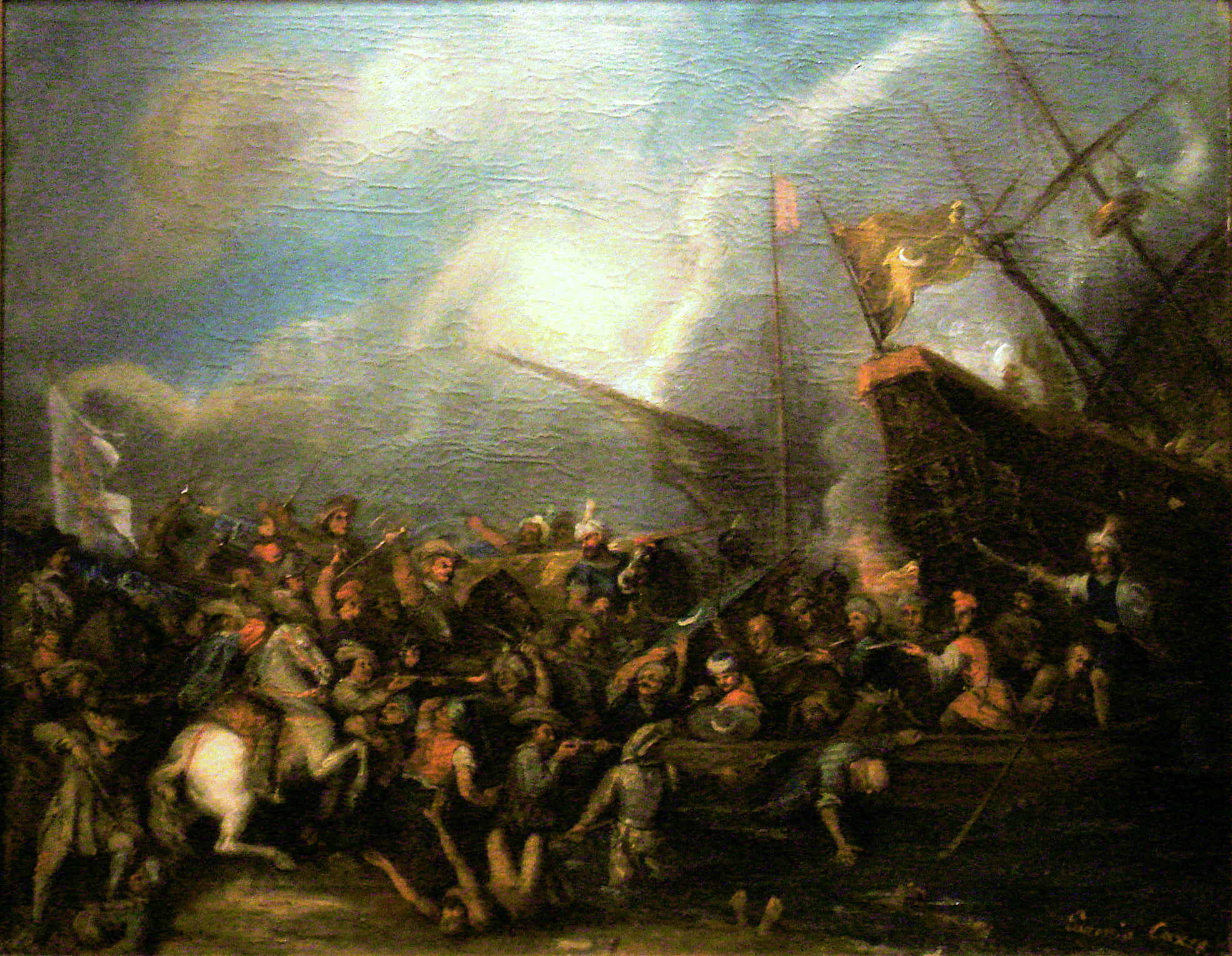
Painting of Turgut Reis landing on Malta by Eugenio Caxes (1575–1634)

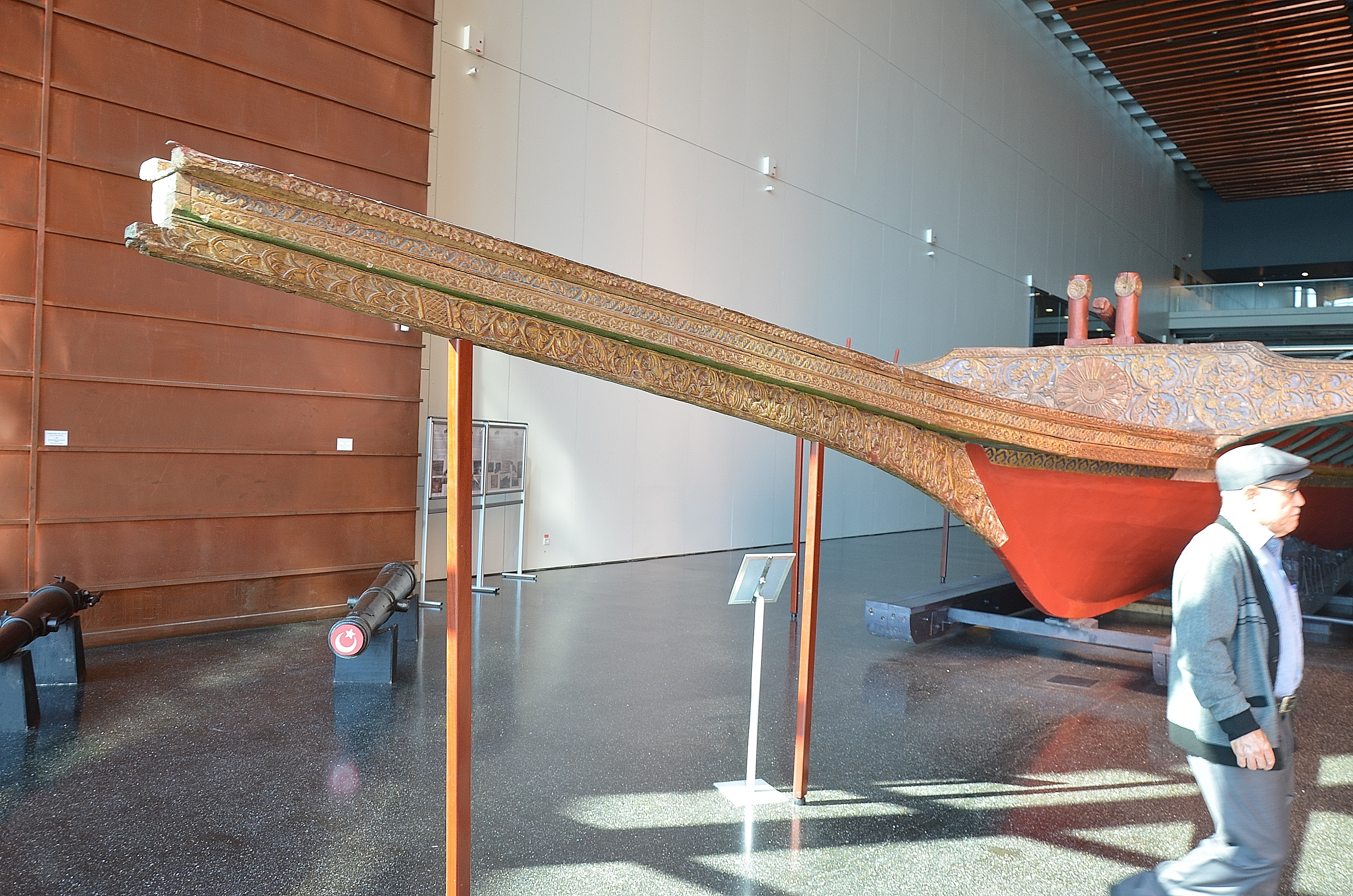
Istanbul Naval Museum, detail of the late 16th or early 17th century Ottoman Navy galley known as Tarihi Kadırga

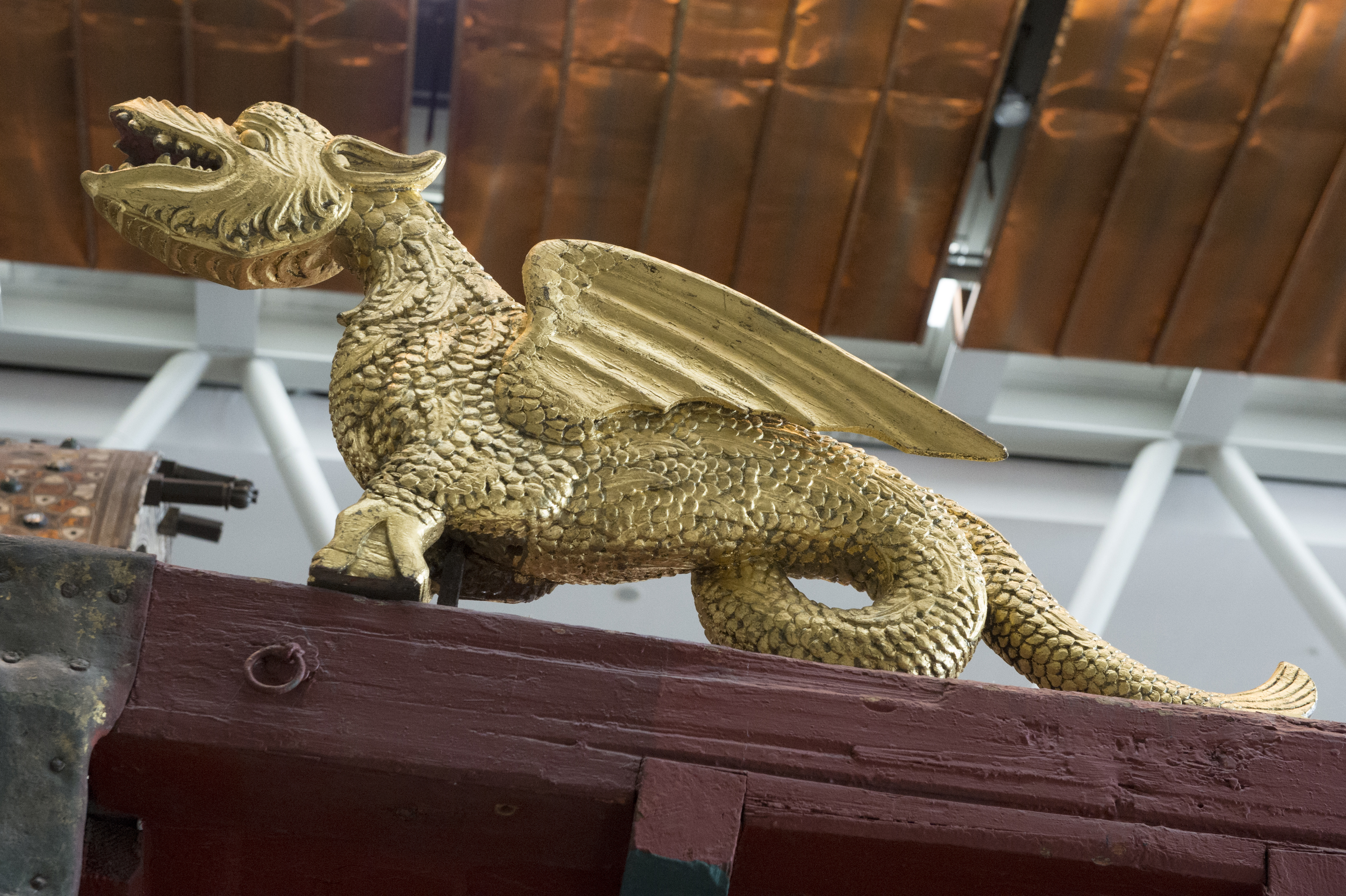
Istanbul Naval Museum, detail of the late 16th or early 17th century Ottoman Navy galley known as Tarihi Kadırga

Istanbul Naval Museum, detail of the late 16th or early 17th century Ottoman Navy galley known as Tarihi Kadırga

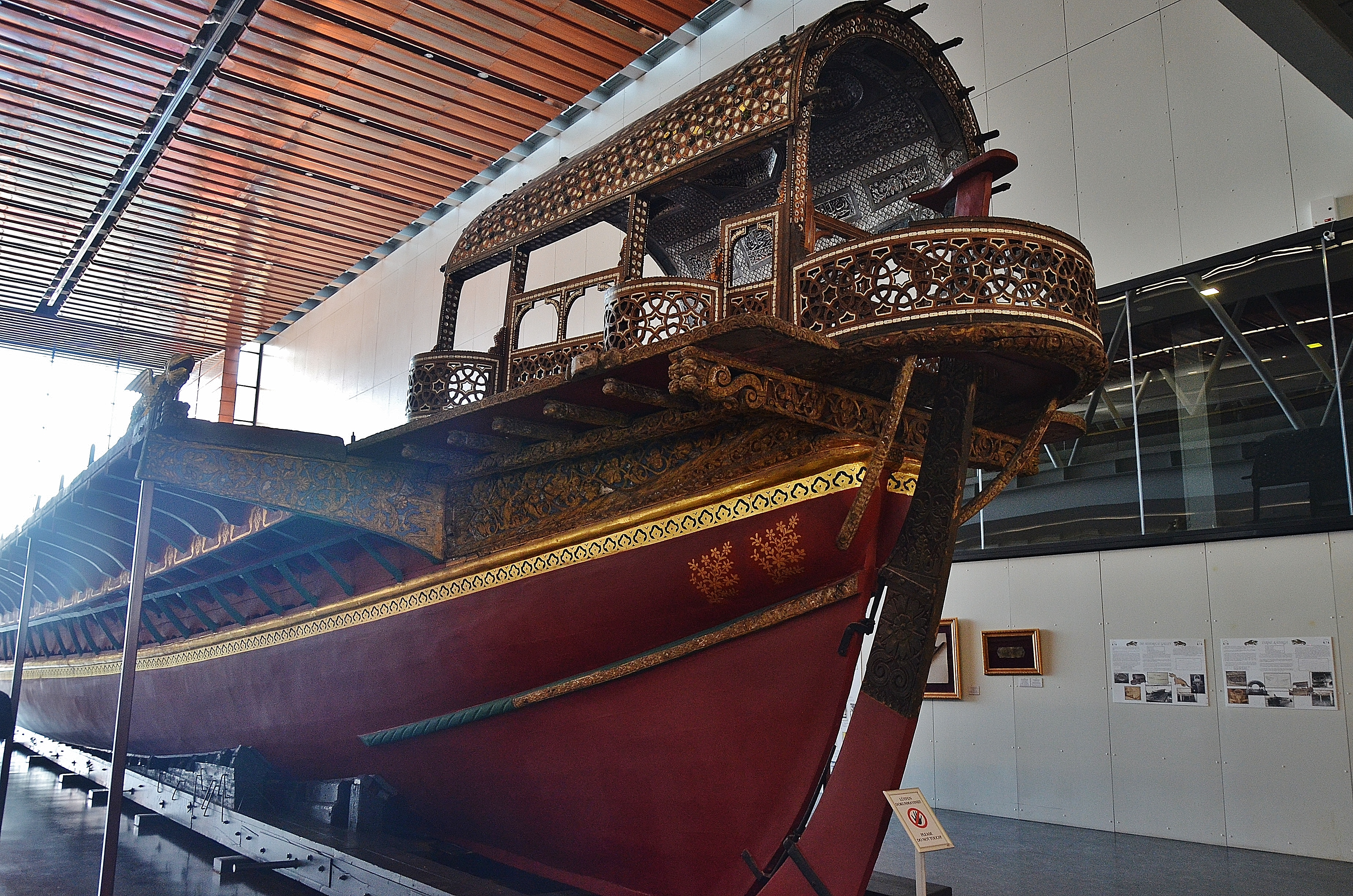
Istanbul Naval Museum, detail of the late 16th or early 17th century Ottoman Navy galley known as Tarihi Kadırga

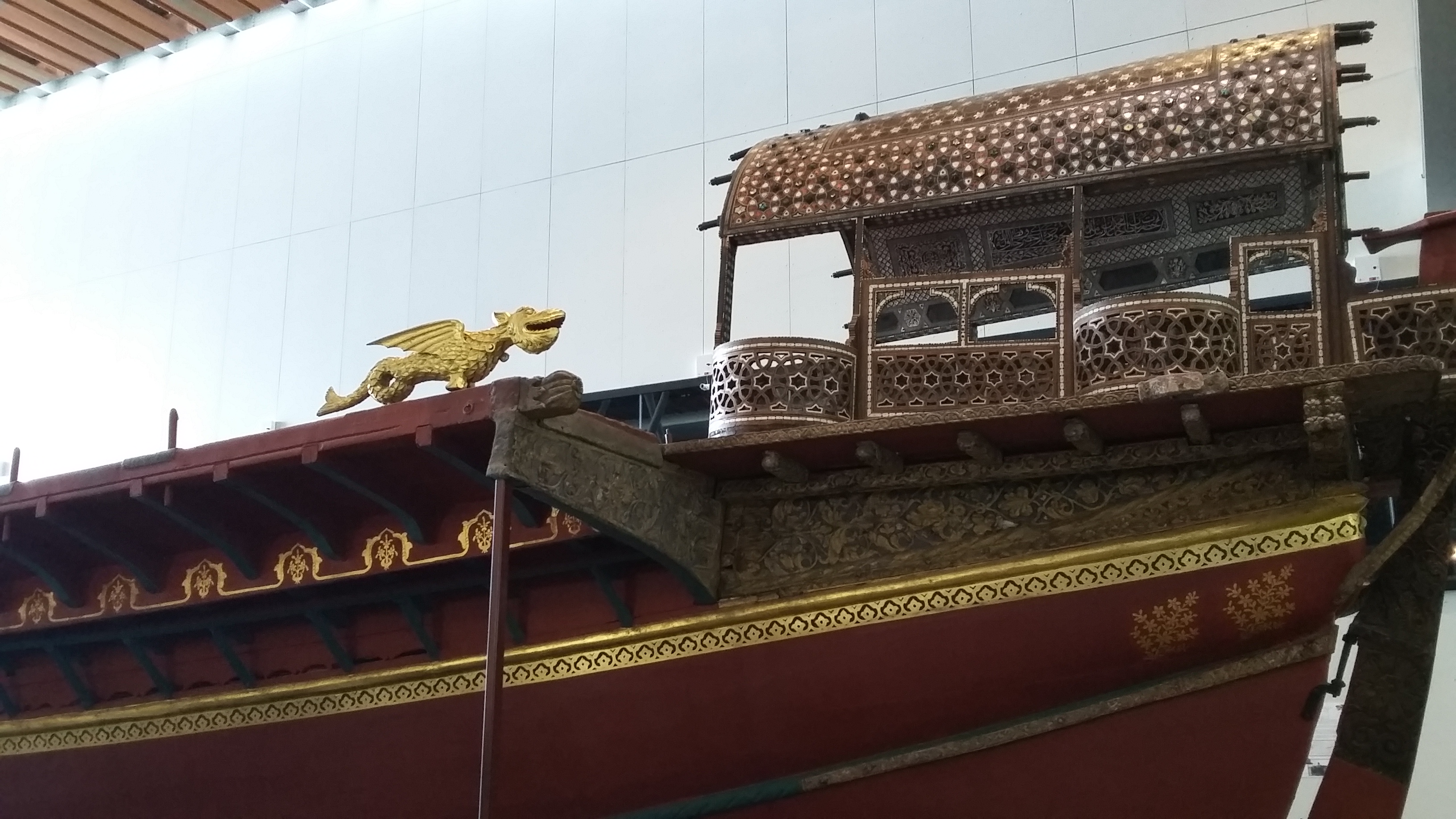
Istanbul Naval Museum, detail of the late 16th or early 17th century Ottoman Navy galley known as Tarihi Kadırga

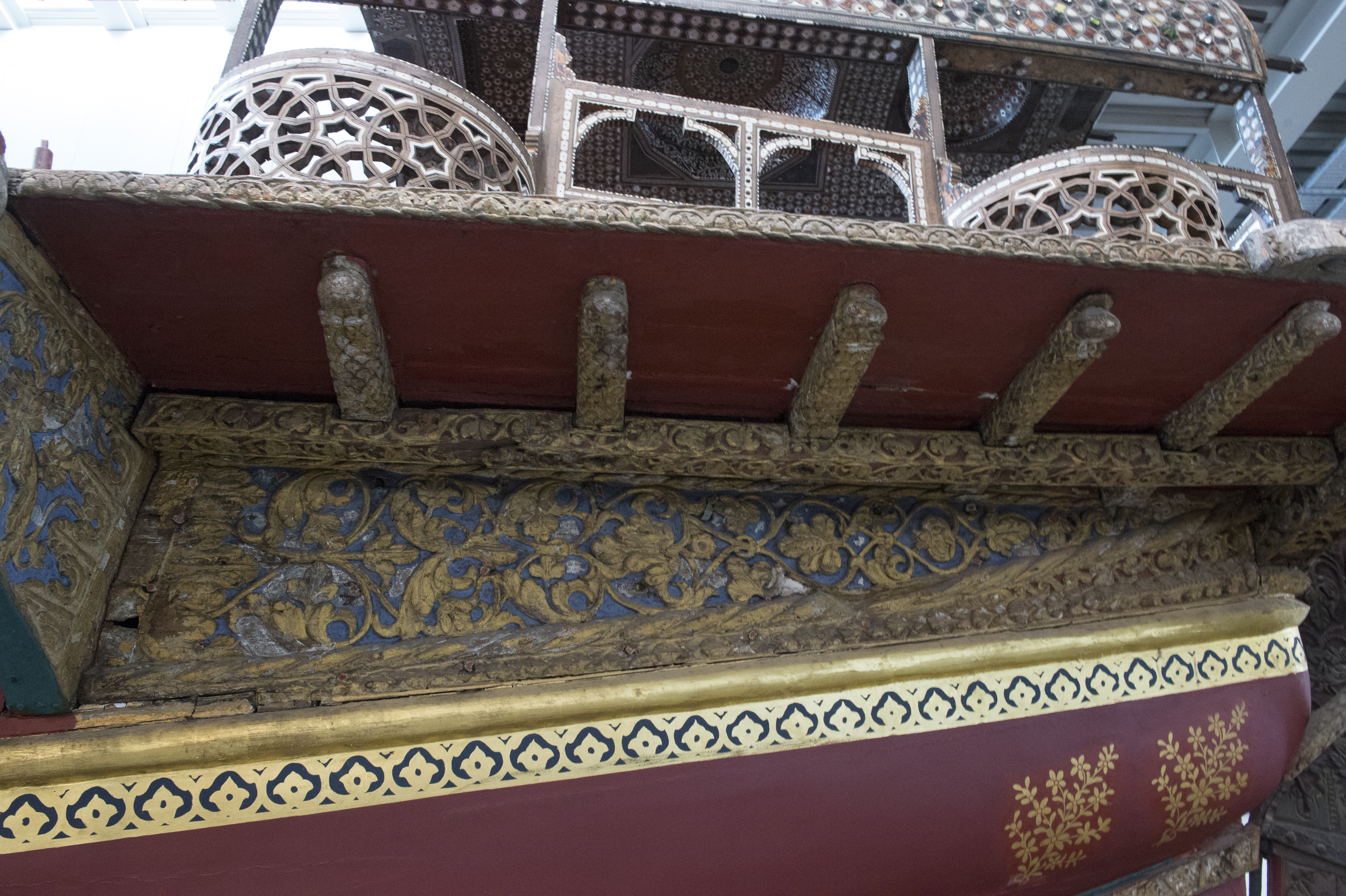
Istanbul Naval Museum, detail of the late 16th or early 17th century Ottoman Navy galley known as Tarihi Kadırga

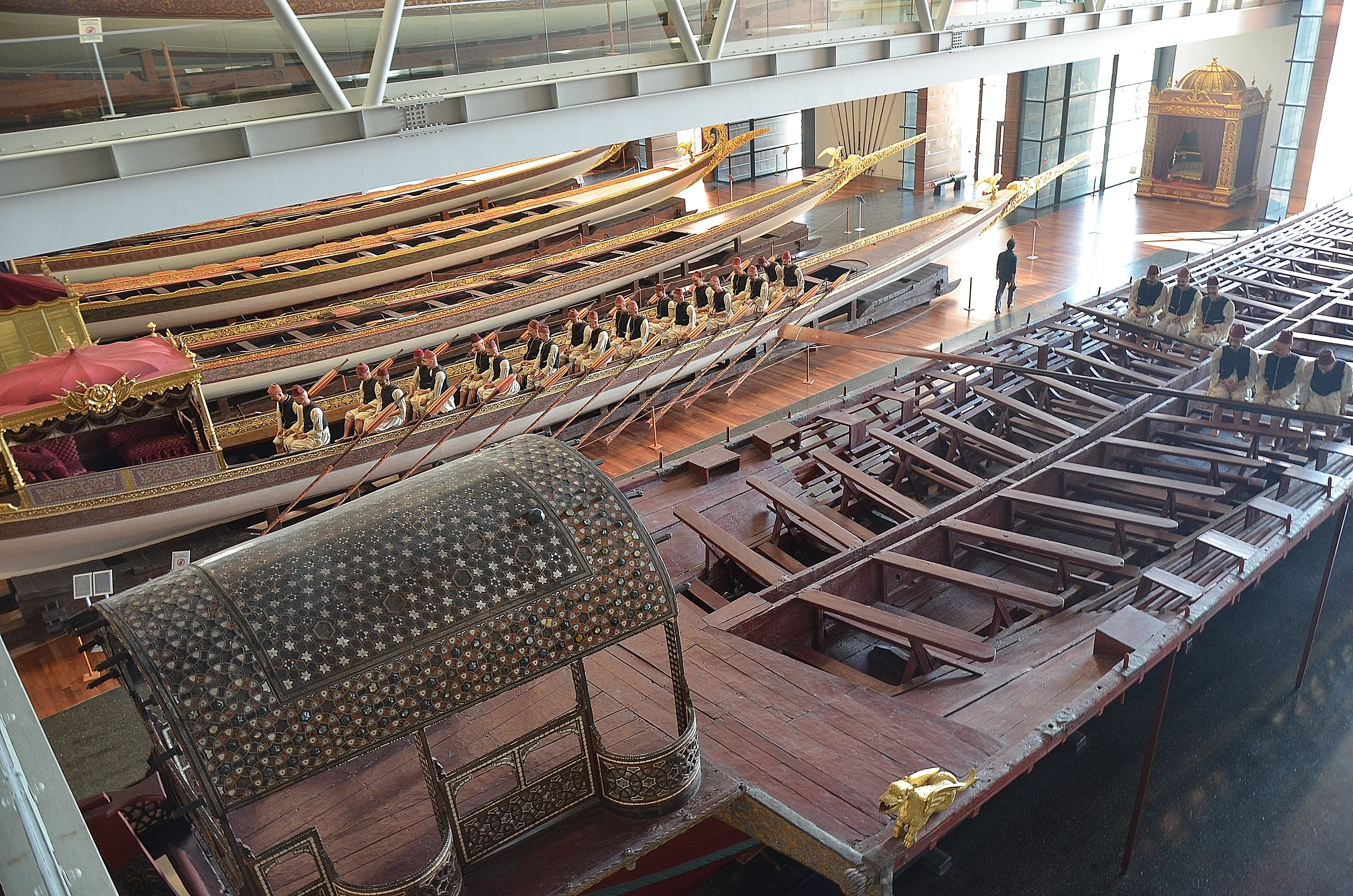
Istanbul Naval Museum, galley and caiques

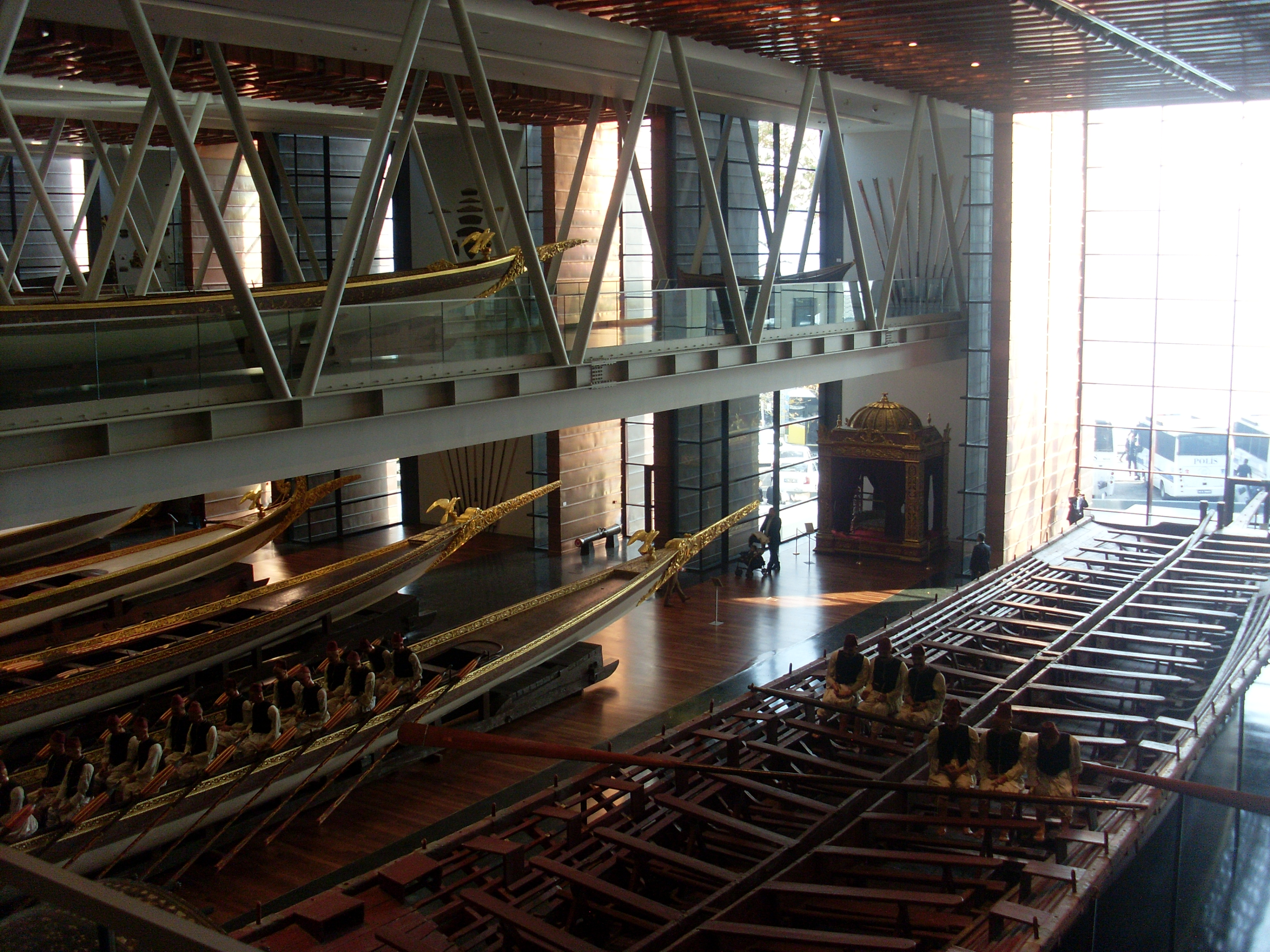
Istanbul Naval Museum, galley and caiques

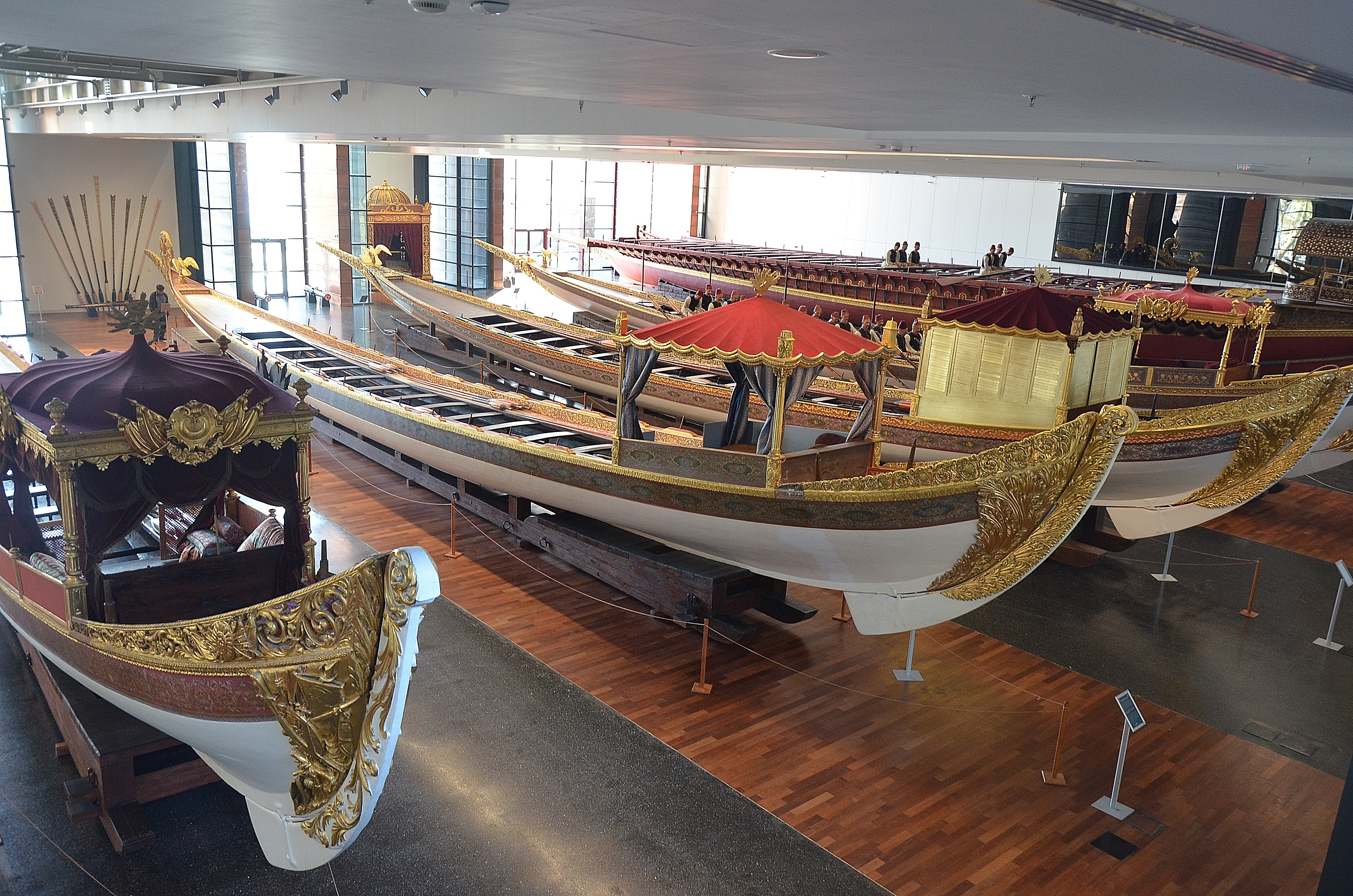
Istanbul Naval Museum, imperial caiques

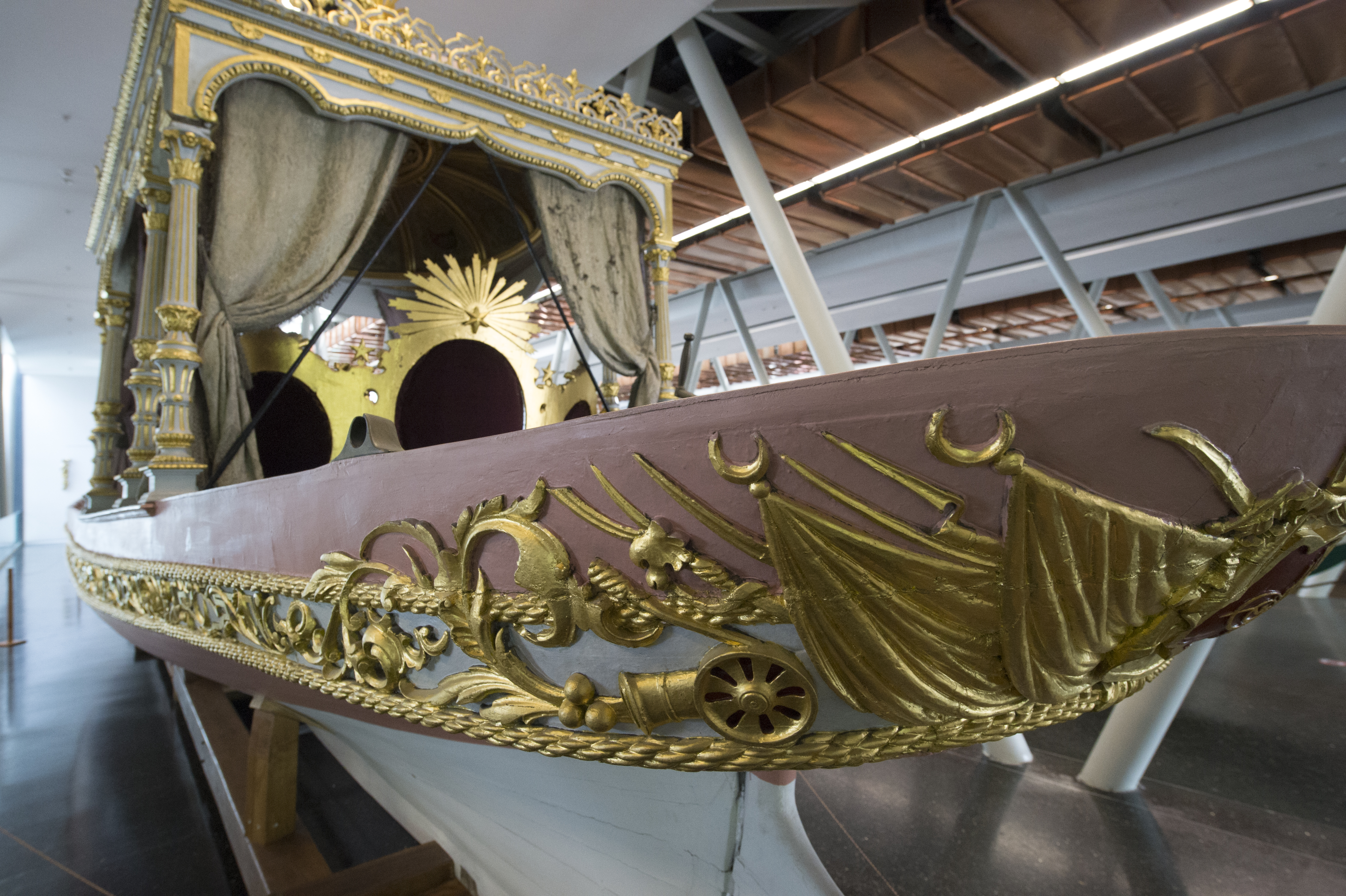
Istanbul Naval Museum, imperial caique of Sultan Mehmed V

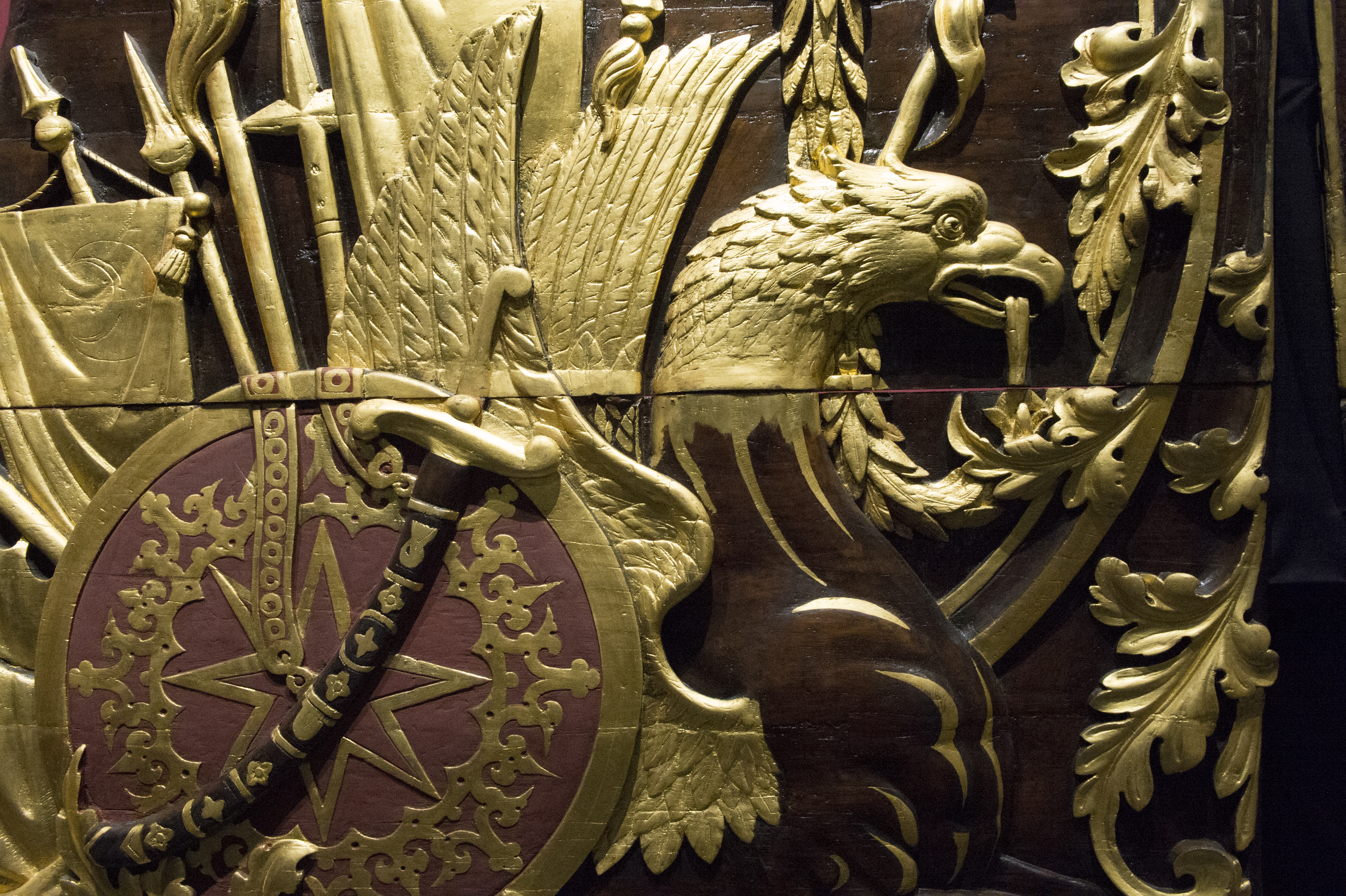
Istanbul Naval Museum, escutcheon detail

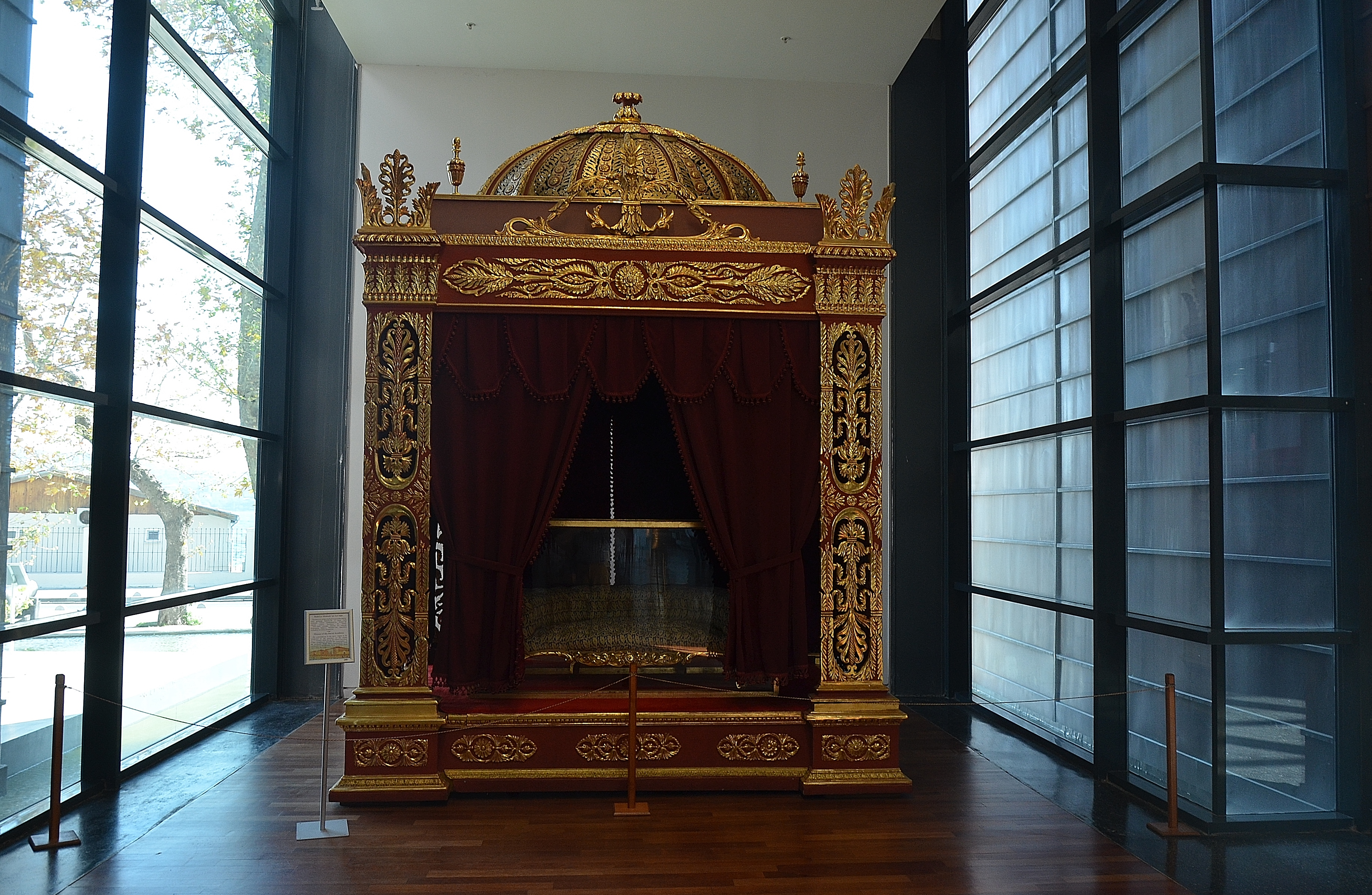
Istanbul Naval Museum, throne

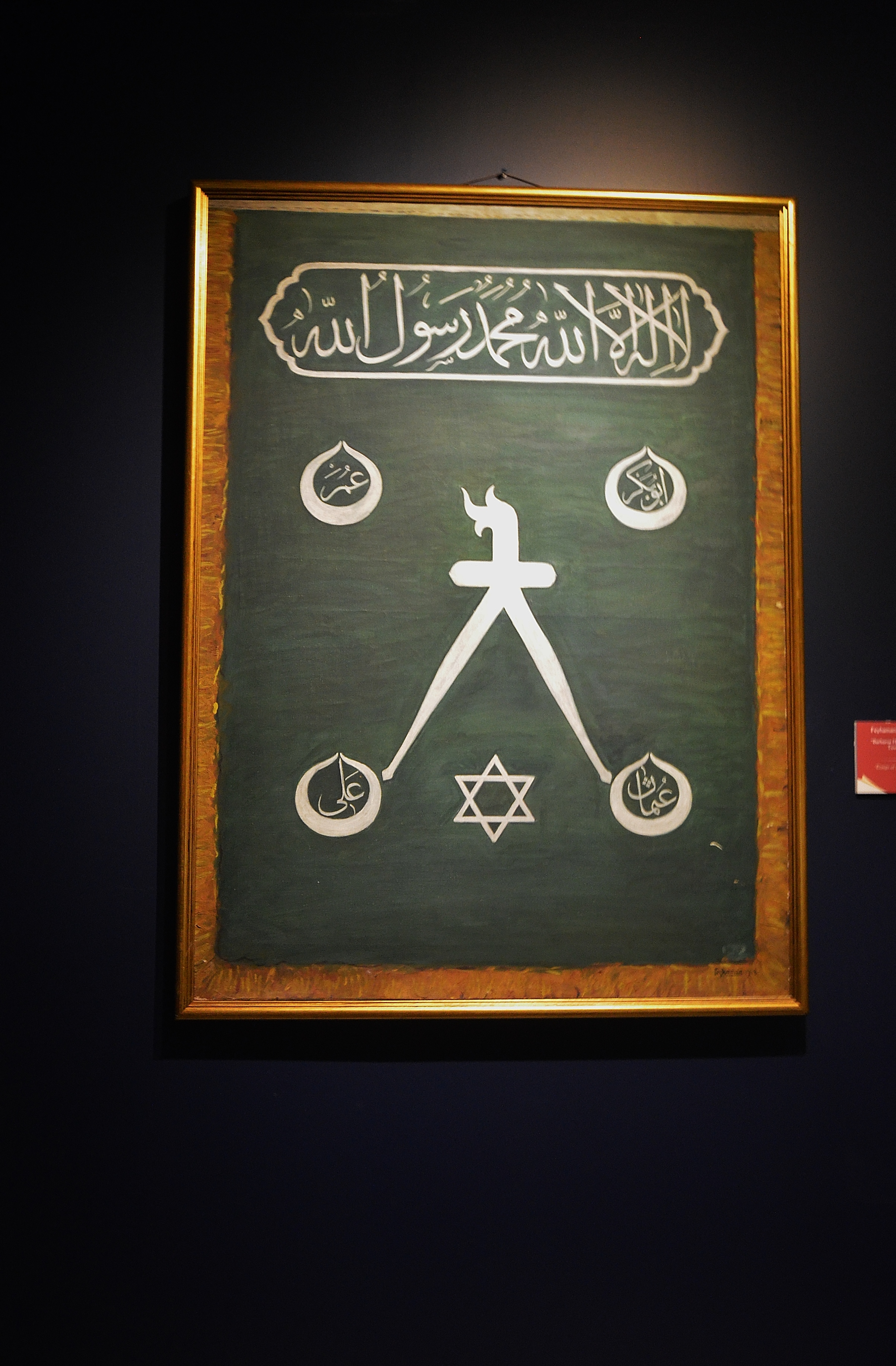
Standard of Barbarossa Hayreddin Pasha

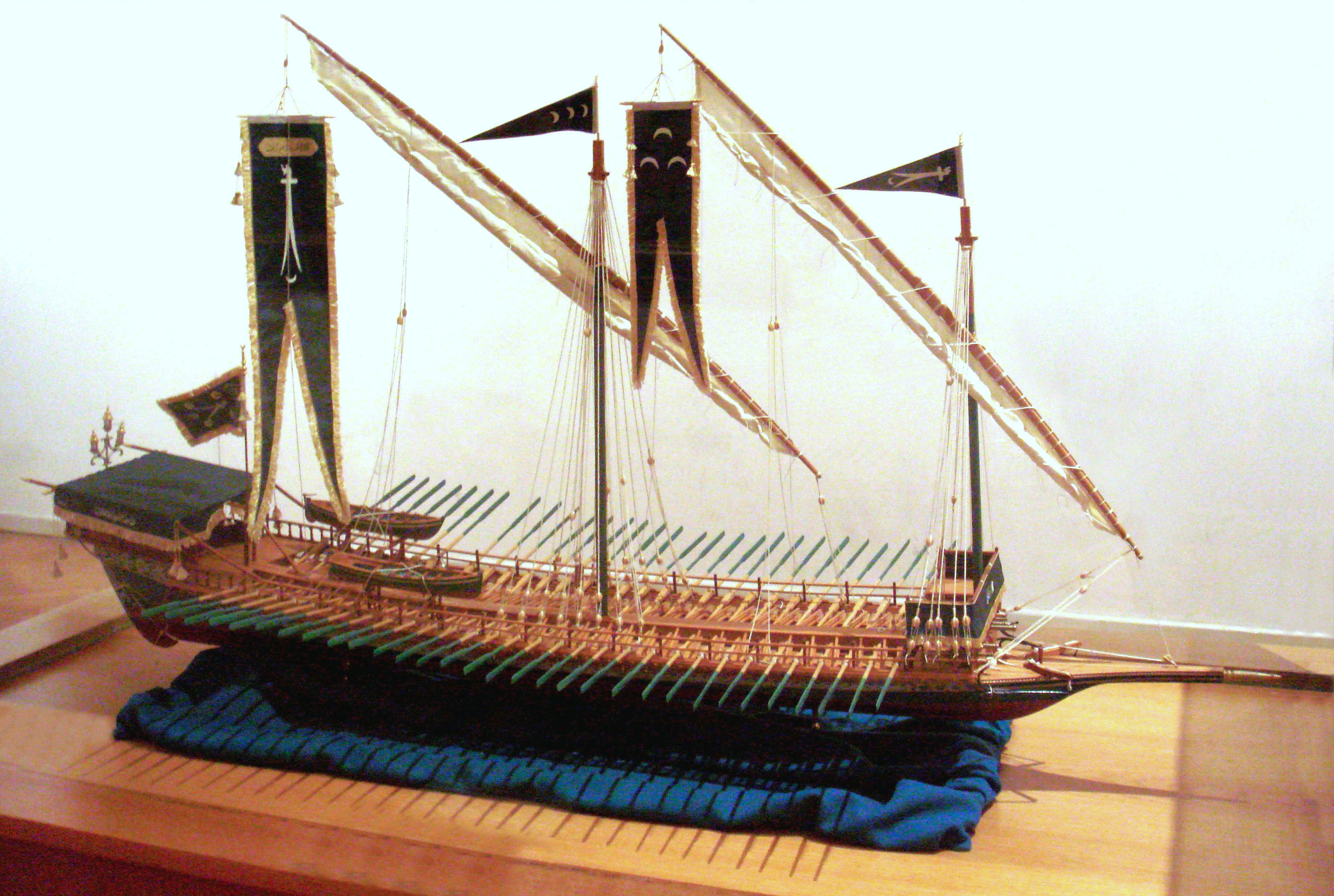
Model of the galley of Barbarossa Hayreddin Pasha during the Siege of Nice in 1543 and the Ottoman wintering in Toulon in 1543–44.

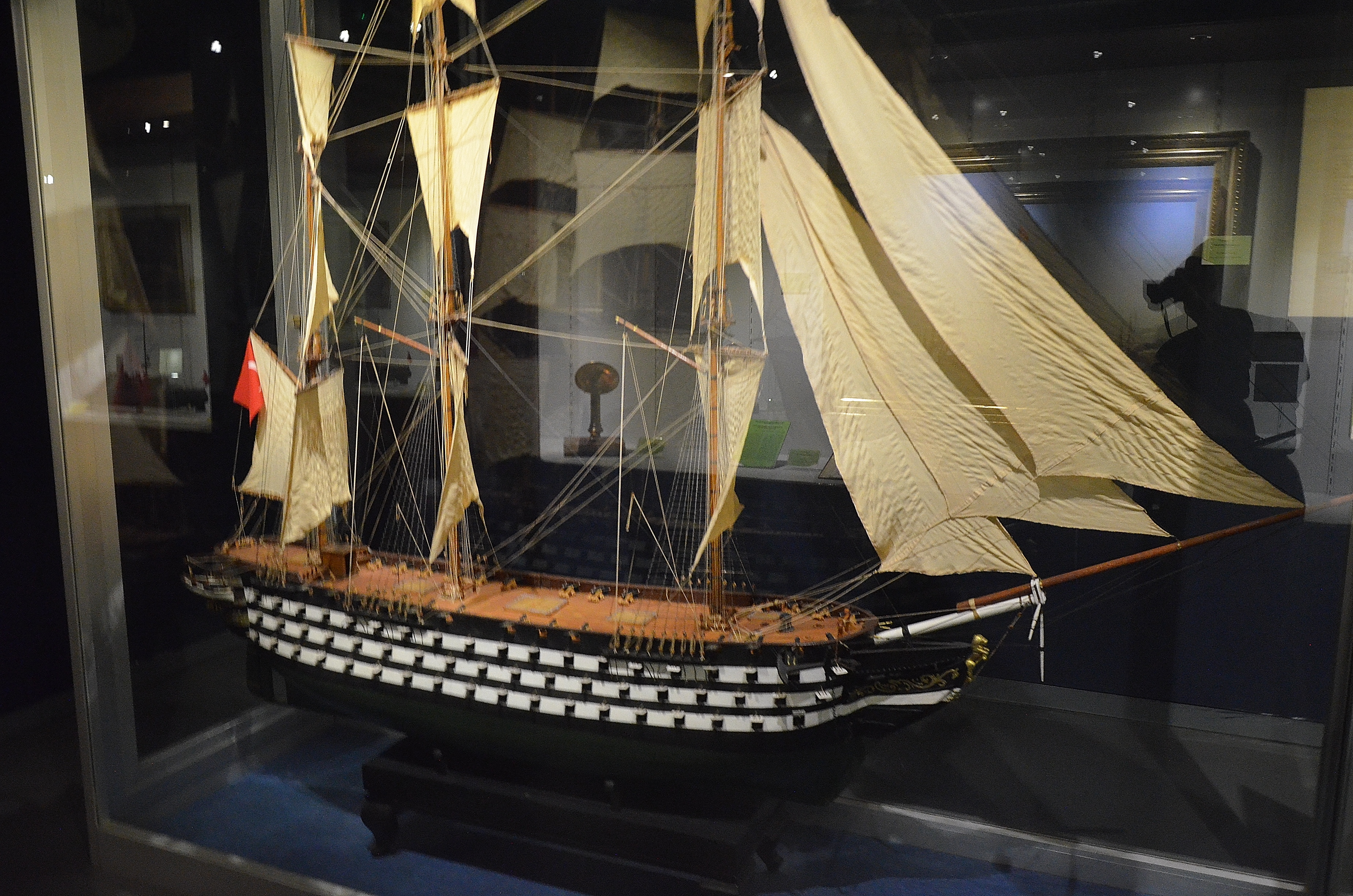
Model of Ottoman Navy flagship Mahmudiye (1829), a three-masted, three-decked, 128-gunned ship-of-the-line which was the world's largest battleship for many years.

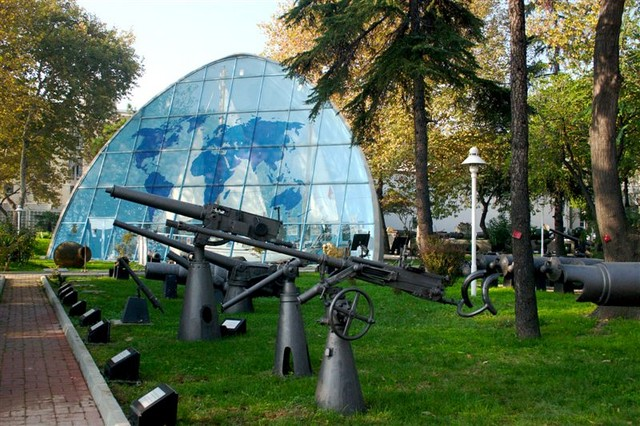
Types of artillery at the Istanbul Naval Museum

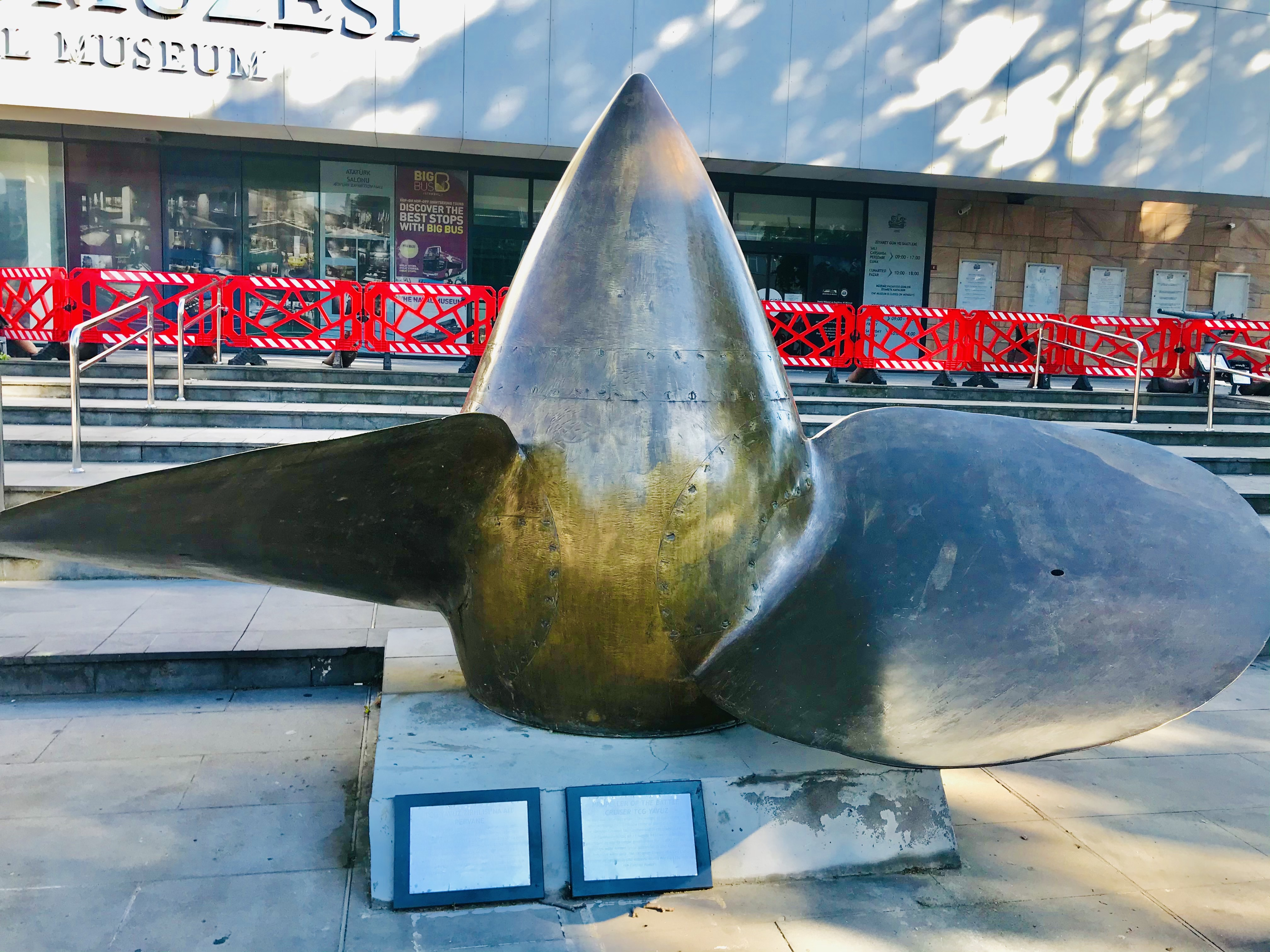
Propeller of the Ottoman battlecruiser TCG Yavuz, formerly SMS Goeben

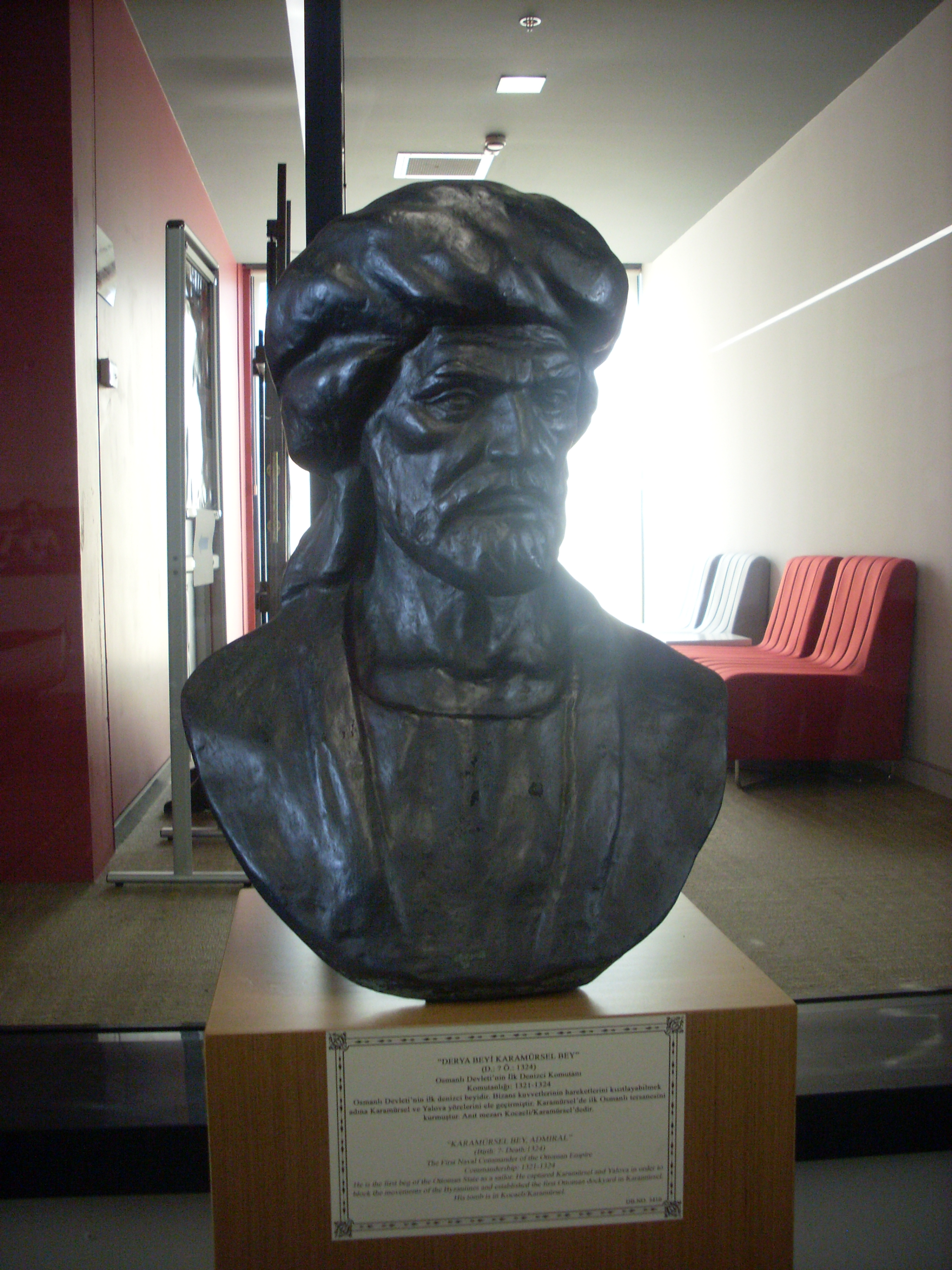
Bust of Kara Mürsel, the first Ottoman Kaptan-ı Derya

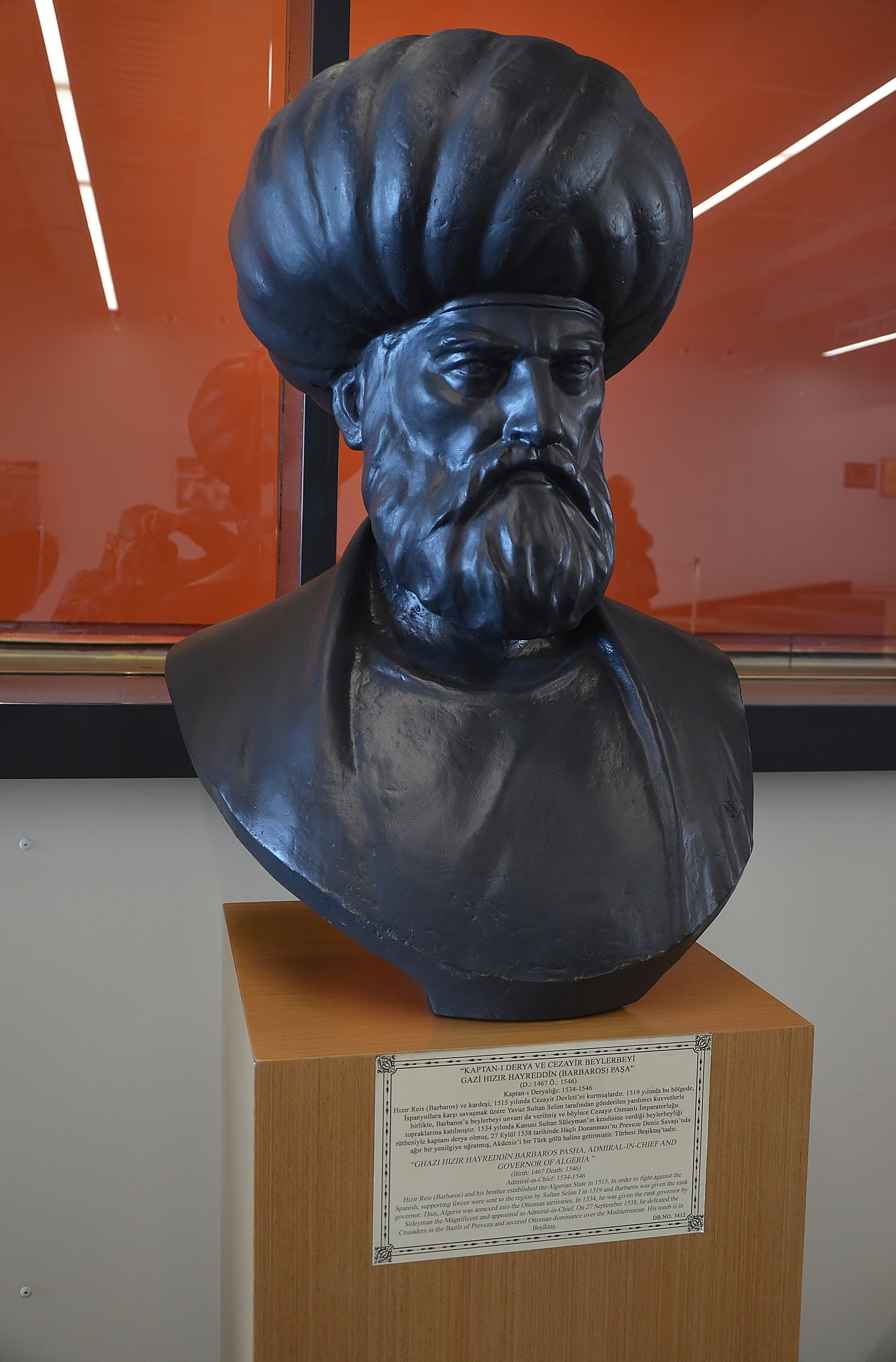
Bust of Barbarossa Hayreddin Pasha

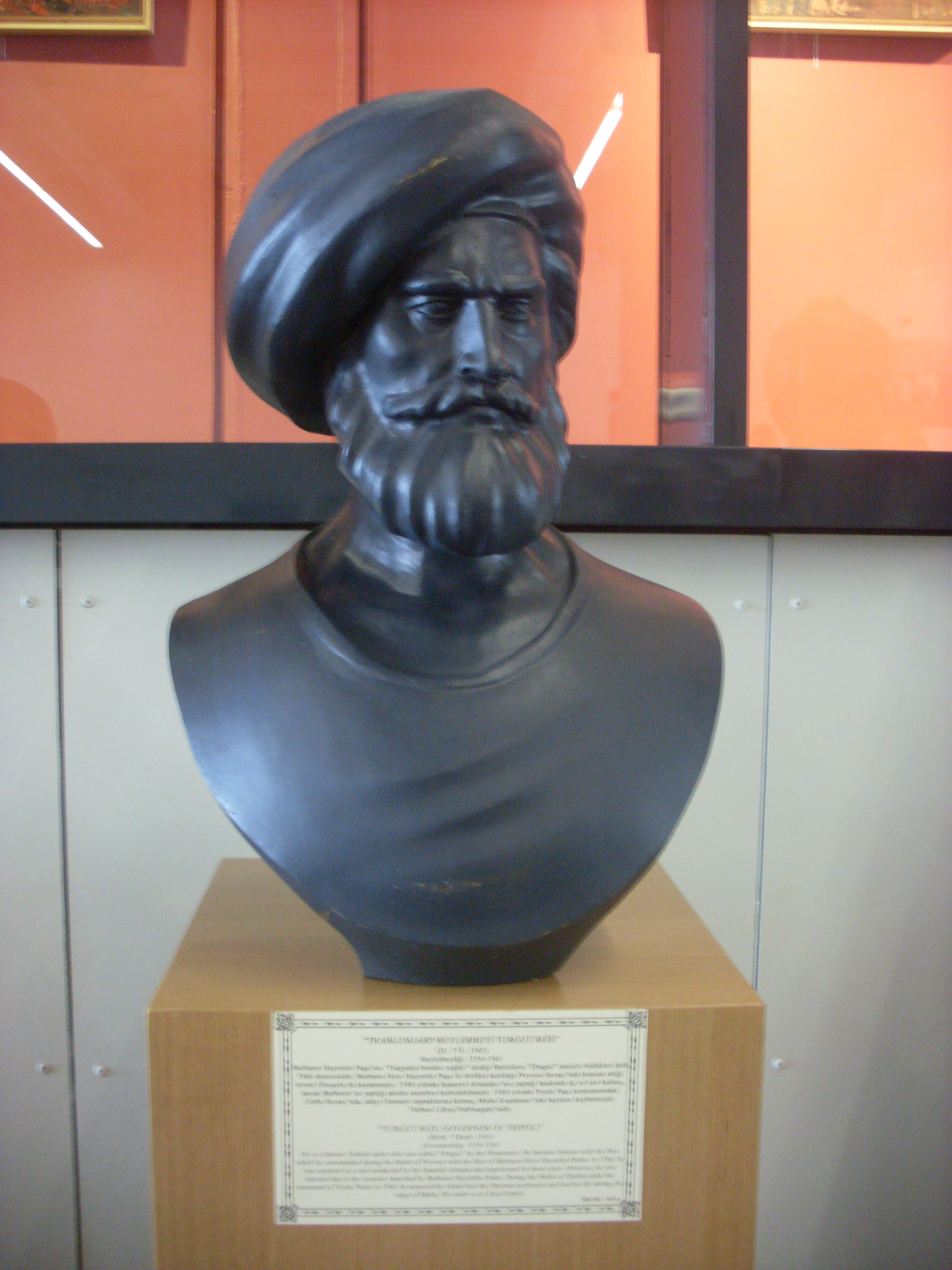
Bust of Turgut Reis

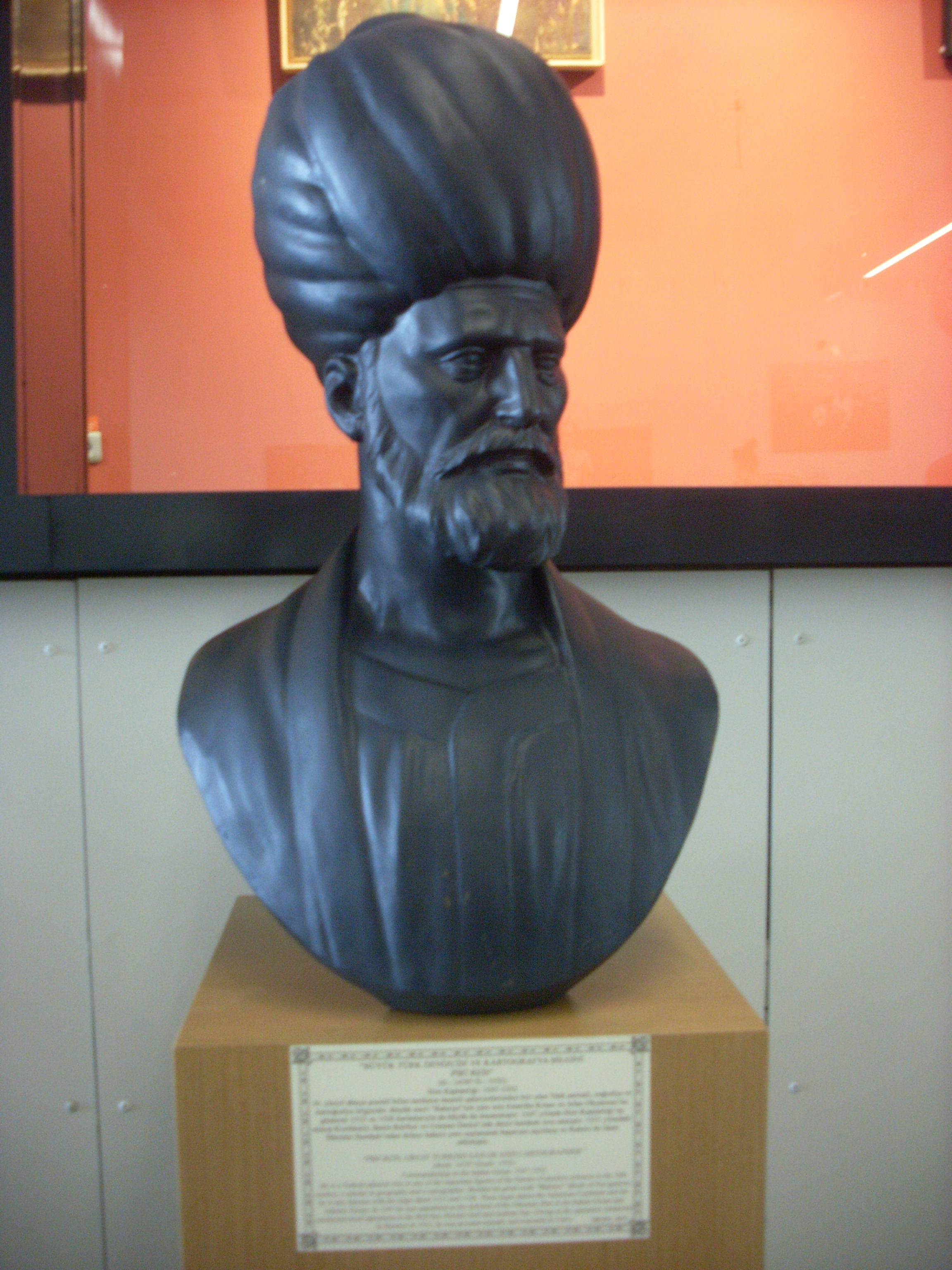
Bust of Piri Reis

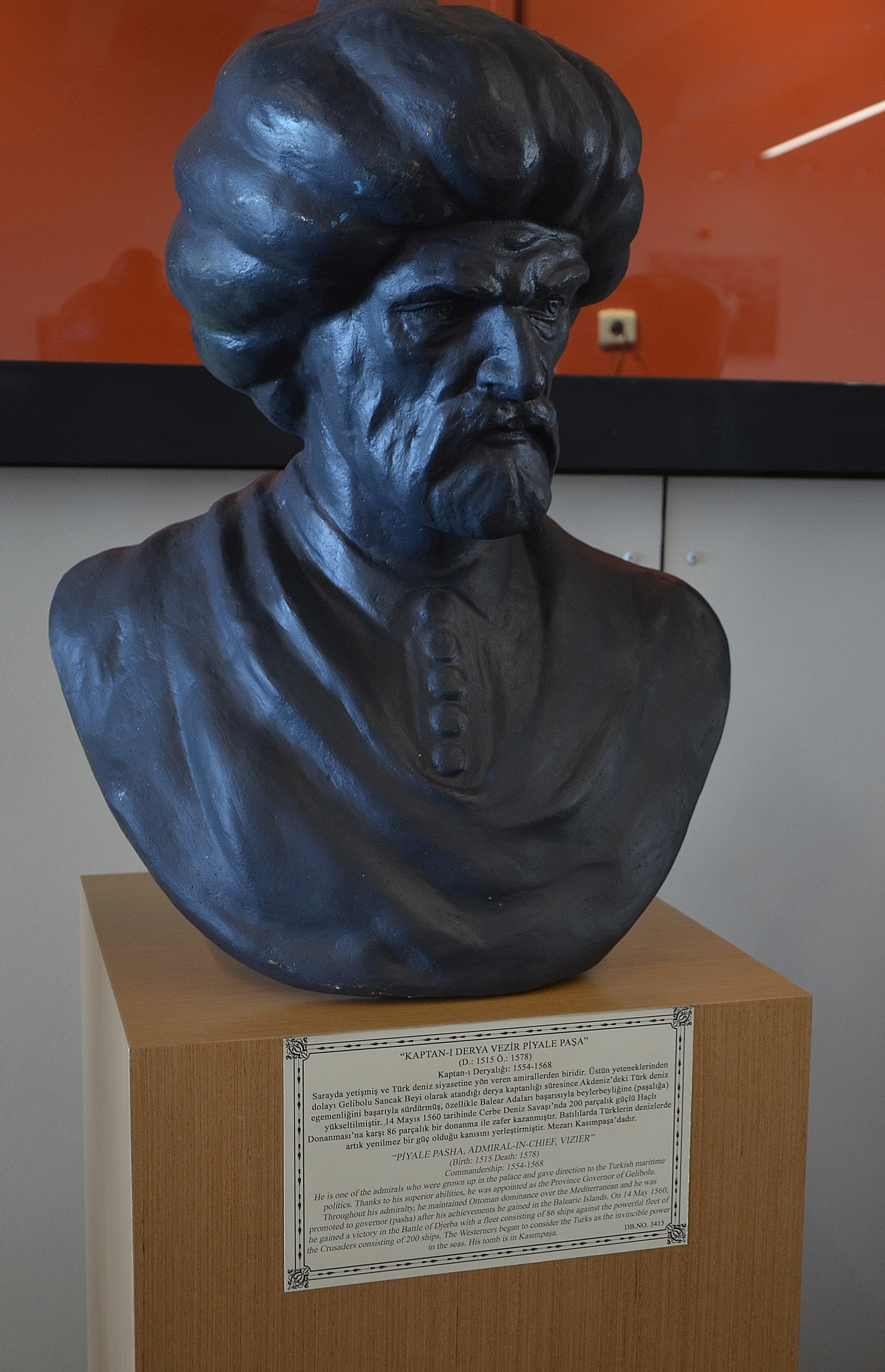
Bust of Piyale Pasha

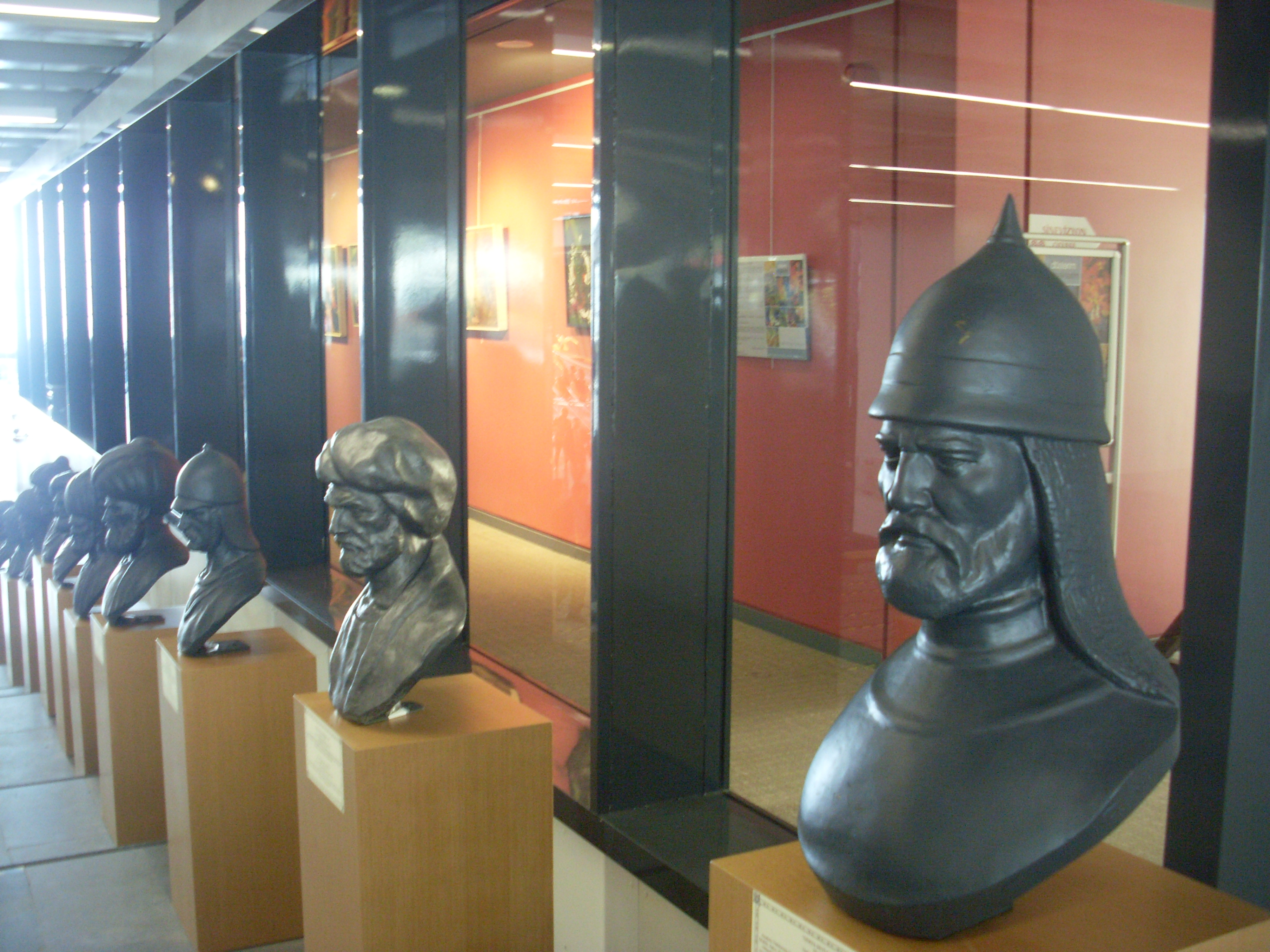
Busts of famous Ottoman admirals and seamen

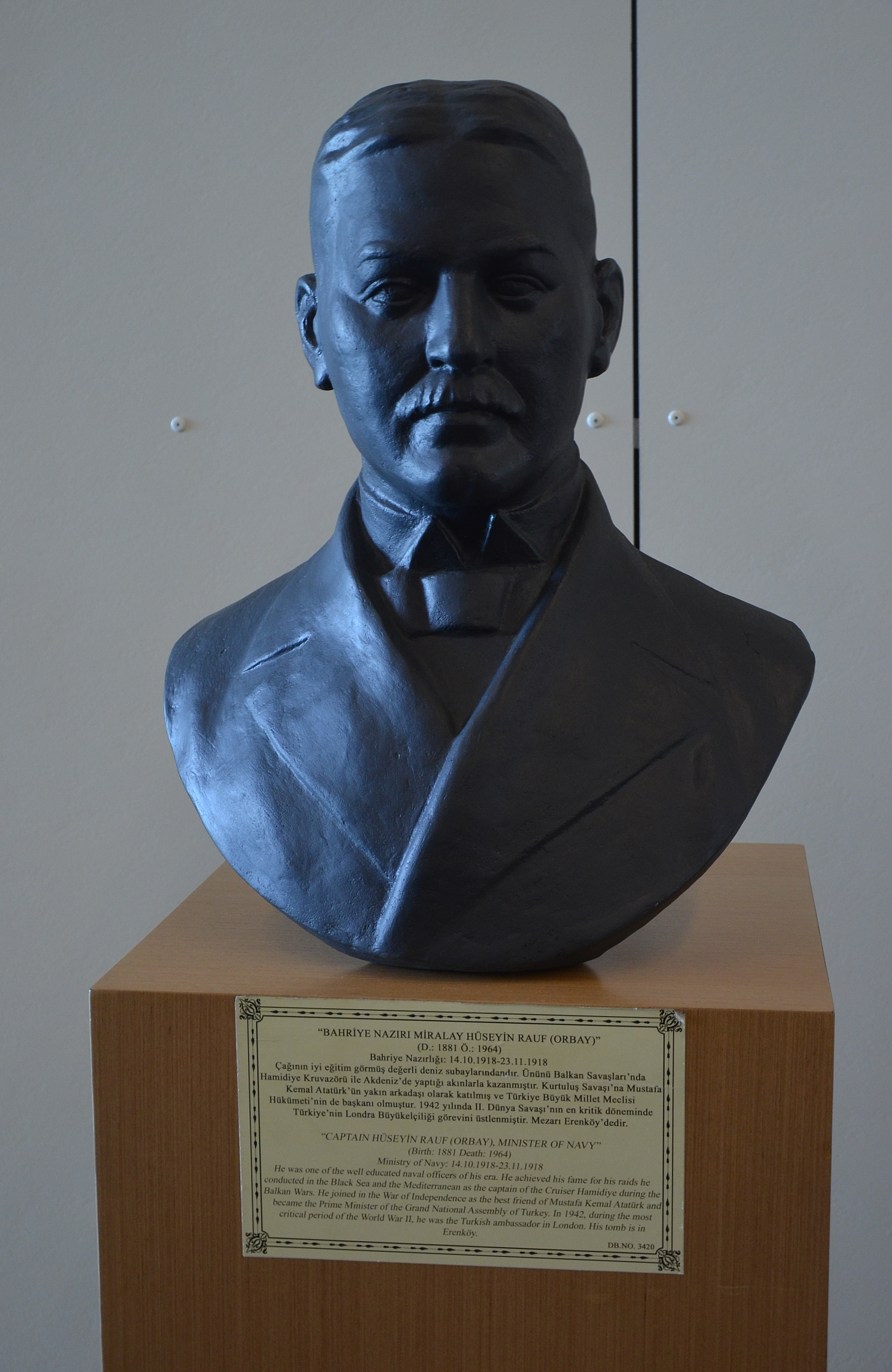
Bust of Captain Hüseyin Rauf Orbay, Ottoman Minister of Navy and Turkish Prime Minister

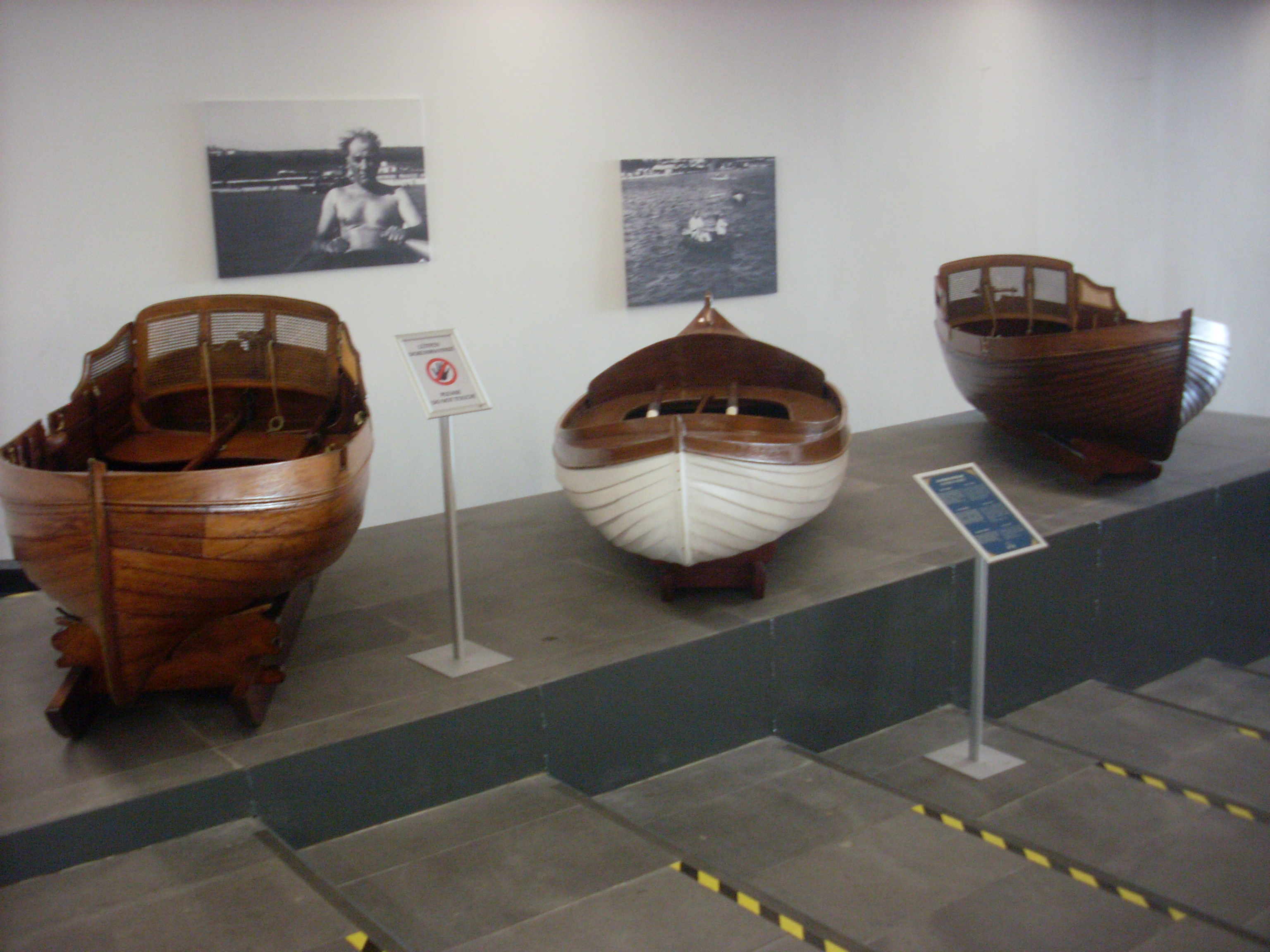
Boats used by Mustafa Kemal Atatürk during his stay at the Florya Marine Mansion in Istanbul

== See also ==
- List of museums and monuments in Istanbul
