= Čengić (surname) =

Čengić is a South Slavic (predominantly Bosniak) surname. It was the name of an affluent Ottoman Bosnian Čengić family. It may refer to:

- Bahrudin Čengić (1931–2007), Bosnian filmmaker known for Silent Gunpowder
- Enes Čengić (1926–1994), Bosnian writer and biographer of Branko Ćopić among others
- Ferid Čengić (1910–1986), Mayor of Sarajevo 1947–48
- Goran Čengić (1946–1992), Yugoslav handball player
- Hasan Čengić (1957–2021), Bosniak politician
- Muhamed Čengić (1942–2020), Bosniak politician
- Smail Agha Čengić (1788–1840), Ottoman nobleman
- Zulfikar Pasha Čengić (died 1846), Ottoman nobleman

== See also ==
- Čengić, place name
- Čengići, place name
- Čengić Vila, neighbourhood in Sarajevo
