= Čengić =

Čengić may refer to:

- Čengić, Bosnia and Herzegovina, village near Bijeljina
- Čengić (surname), South Slavic surname

== See also ==
- Čengići (plural)
