= List of oldest fathers =

This is a list of people reported to have fathered a child at or after 75 years of age. Most of these have not necessarily been verified.

== Medical considerations ==
According to a 1969 study, there is a decrease in sperm concentration as men age. The study reported that 90% of seminiferous tubules in men in their 20s and 30s contained spermatids, whereas men in their 40s and 50s had spermatids in 50% of their seminiferous tubules. In the study, only 10% of seminiferous tubules from men aged > 80 years contained spermatids. In a random international sample of 11,548 men confirmed to be biological fathers by DNA paternity testing, the oldest father was found to be 66 years old at the birth of his child; the ratio of DNA-confirmed versus DNA-rejected paternity tests around that age is in agreement with the notion of general male infertility greater than age 65–66.

== List of claims ==
Date	Name	Age	Country	Notes and citation(s)
January 1951	James E. Smith	101 years	United States	Smith's age was disputed. He claimed to have been born in 1849 or even March 16, 1848, but other records suggested he may have been 15 years younger. He supposedly also had twins in 1948, when he was 99.
1948	James E. Smith	99 years	United States	Smith's age was disputed. He claimed to have been born in 1849 or even March 16, 1848, but other records suggested he may have been 15 years younger. He supposedly also had twins in 1948, when he was 99.
October 5, 2012	Ramjit Raghav	96 years	India	Raghav claimed to have become the world's oldest father at the age of 94 when his first child was born in 2010. He claimed to have broken his own record in 2012 by having a son at 96.
2010	Ramjit Raghav	94 years	India	Raghav claimed to have become the world's oldest father at the age of 94 when his first child was born in 2010. He claimed to have broken his own record in 2012 by having a son at 96.
February 2024	Dr. John Levin	92 years	Australia	
July 1992	Les Colley	92 years	Australia	
February 2017	Mahmoud Adam	92 years	Palestine	
1978 or 1979	Zvonimir Rogoz	91 or 92 years	Croatia	
July 26, 2006	Julio Iglesias Sr.	91 years	Spain	Posthumous birth Ruth Iglesias, his fourth child and only daughter, was born 7 months after her father died and the day after what would have been his 91st birthday. He was also the father of Julio Iglesias and grandfather of Enrique Iglesias, both singers.
July 1, 2020	Bernie Ecclestone	89 years	United Kingdom	Ecclestone is the former head of Formula One motor racing. He previously had daughters in 1955, 1984, and 1988; his younger two daughters, Tamara and Petra respectively, are both socialites. His youngest child, Ace, is his only son.
May 28, 2010	Armais Nazarov	89 years	Russia	
October 1988	Jimmie C. Jones	88 years	United States	Jimmie became the father of his fifth child, Roger, in the month of October 1988. Jimmie was 88 years old when his last child was born.
March 10, 2024	Tzvi Kushelevsky	88 years	Israel	
December 23, 1921	Husein-beg Čengić-Zulfikarpašić	87 years	Bosnia and Herzegovina	Father of vice president of the Republic of Bosnia and Herzegovina Adil Zulfikarpašić, Čengić-Zulfikarpašić was the mayor of Foča for 25 years after the Austrian-Hungarian occupation of Bosnia and Herzegovina in 1878, a landowner, an intellectual, the son of Ali-beg Čengić and a grandson of Zulfikar Pasha Čengić. Husein died in 1936 aged 102 or 104 years when Adil was 15.
27 May 1886	William Price	86 years	United Kingdom	
c. 1884	William Price	84 years	United Kingdom	
c. 1883	William Price	83 years	United Kingdom	
1933	Mose Triplett	86 years	United States	Father of Irene Triplett, the last surviving recipient of an American Civil War pension.
January 9, 1930	Mose Triplett	83 years	United States	Father of Irene Triplett, the last surviving recipient of an American Civil War pension.
January 31, 2002	Ernest Lehman	86 years	United States	
August 6, 2025	Anatoly Kashpirovsky	85 years	Russia	Russian psychotherapist. His third child, daughter Ellina, was born 5 days before his 86th birthday.
July 23, 2016	Kostas Voutsas	85 years	Greece	
August 1, 2013	Edwin Edwards	85 years	United States	
December 23, 1999	Saul Bellow	84 years	United States	
1999 or 2000	Major Jewel McDonald	84 years	United States	
October 30, 2023	Jack White	83 years	Germany	Jack White was the artist name of Horst Nussbaum. He was a German music producer with worldwide hits such as "Gloria" and "Self Control" by Laura Branigan.
2017	Itzhak Fintzi	83 years	Bulgaria	Matilda is the second child of actor Itzhak Fintzi, first with director Lisa Boeva.
June 22, 2018	Horst Paulmann	83 years	Chile	
June 15, 2023	Al Pacino	83 years	United States	American actor and filmmaker.
September 17, 2019	Sitarama Rajarao	82 years	India	His wife Erramatti herself holds the record of oldest mother to ever give birth to a child.
September 16, 2021	Alberto Cormillot	82 years	Argentina	
April 28, 2016	Pehr G. Gyllenhammar	81 years	Sweden	
July 5, 1996	Anthony Quinn	81 years	United States	
April 2000	James Doohan	80 years	Canada	
December 16, 1885	Ferdinand de Lesseps	80 years	France	
c. 1996	Michael Young	80 years	United Kingdom	Gaia Young suddenly died in 2021 at the age of 25.
June 30, 2026	Anton Goosen	80 years	South Africa	South African musician and songwriter.
May 11, 2024	Horst-Dieter Esch	80 years	Mexico	
August 20, 1904	Sir Charles Tennant, 1st Baronet	80 years	United Kingdom	
August 2014	Endre Czeizel	79 years	Hungary	
May 9, 2023	Robert De Niro	79 years	United States	
April 19? 2016	Mohinder Singh Gill	79 years	India	
2019	Emmanuil Vitorgan	79 years	Russia	
June 15, 1998	Tony Randall	78 years	United States	
April 1997	Tony Randall	77 years	United States	
2010	Albert Corscaden	78 years	Ireland	
2004	Mark Taimanov	78 years	Russia	Had twins.
2025	Eduardo Costantini	78 years	Argentina	
June 12, 1999	Stanley Ho	77 years	Macau	
1998	Luiz Da Costa Silva	77 years	Brazil	
June 27, 2008	Charan Singh Panwar	77 years	India	Had twins.
November 23, 2009	Ning Jianyou	77 years	China	
April 19, 2020	Noah Adenuga	77 years	Nigeria	Had twins after four IVF attempts.
January 1931	Lyon Tyler	77 years	United States	Lyon's second son Harrison Ruffin Tyler was born in 1928. Lyon was the son of US President John Tyler. His last son, Henry Tyler, was born in January 1931 when he was 77, but the boy died at more than a week old.
1928	Lyon Tyler	75 years	United States	Lyon's second son Harrison Ruffin Tyler was born in 1928. Lyon was the son of US President John Tyler. His last son, Henry Tyler, was born in January 1931 when he was 77, but the boy died at more than a week old.
1988/1989	João Marinho Neto	76/77 years	Brazil	Neto is now the world's oldest living man aged 114 years.
2010	Barry Stephenson	76 years	United Kingdom	
December 2009	Dennis Ealam	76 years	United Kingdom	
2010	Vidas Antonovas	76 years	Lithuania	
1870	Randall Fish	75 years	United States	Father of Albert Fish.

== See also ==
- Advanced maternal age
- List of multiple births
- List of oldest mothers
- List of people with the most children
- List of youngest parents
- Genealogies of Genesis including multiple accounts of super-aged fathers
