= Turks in Bosnia and Herzegovina =

Ethnic group in Bosnia and Herzegovina

Bosna Türkleri
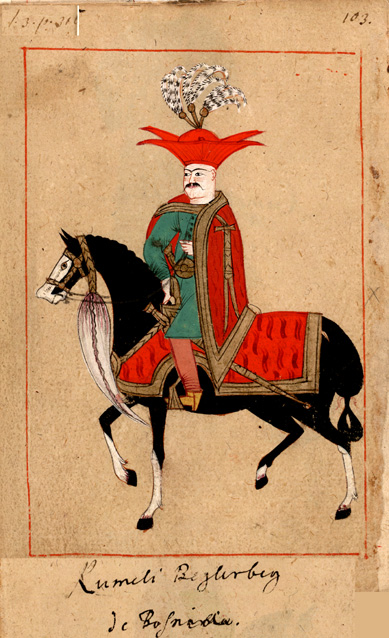
- Turkish beylerbey of Bosnia Eyalet

Total population
- Turkish minority only: 1,108 (2013 census)

Languages
- Turkish and Bosnian

Religion
- Sunni Islam

Related ethnic groups
- Turks

The Turks in Bosnia and Herzegovina (Turkish: Bosna-Hersek'teki Türkler, Bosnian: Turci u Bosni i Hercegovini / Турци у Босни и Херцеговини) also referred to as Bosnian Turks, are ethnic Turks who form the oldest ethnic minority in Bosnia and Herzegovina. The Turkish community began to settle in the region in the 15th century under Ottoman rule, however, many Turks immigrated to Turkey when Bosnia and Herzegovina came under Austro-Hungarian rule.

== History ==
When the Ottoman Empire conquered the Bosnian kingdom in 1463, a significant Turkish community arrived in the region. The Turkish community grew steadily throughout the Ottoman rule of Bosnia; however, after the Ottomans were defeated in the Balkan Wars (1912–13), the majority of Turks, along with other Muslims living in the region, left their homes and migrated to Turkey as "Muhacirs" (Muslim refugees from non-Muslim countries).

== Culture ==
In 2003 the Parliamentary Assembly of Bosnia and Herzegovina adopted the Law on the Protection of Rights of Members of National Minorities. According to the Law, the Turkish minority's cultural, religious, educational, social, economic, and political freedoms are protected by the State.

=== Language ===
The Turkish language is officially recognized as a minority language of Bosnia and Herzegovina in accordance with the European Charter for Regional or Minority Languages, under Article 2, paragraph 2, of the 2010 ratification.

According to the 2013 census, 1,233 people (817 males, 416 females), 990 of whom lived in the Sarajevo Canton, declared Turkish as their mother tongue whereas 1,108 (738 males, 370 females), 970 of whom lived in the Sarajevo Canton, declared themselves as ethnic Turks.

=== Religion ===
The Turkish minority practice the Sunni branch of Islam but tend to be highly secular.

=== Community ===
Turkish community in Bosnia is well provided, due to historical strong bond between both countries.

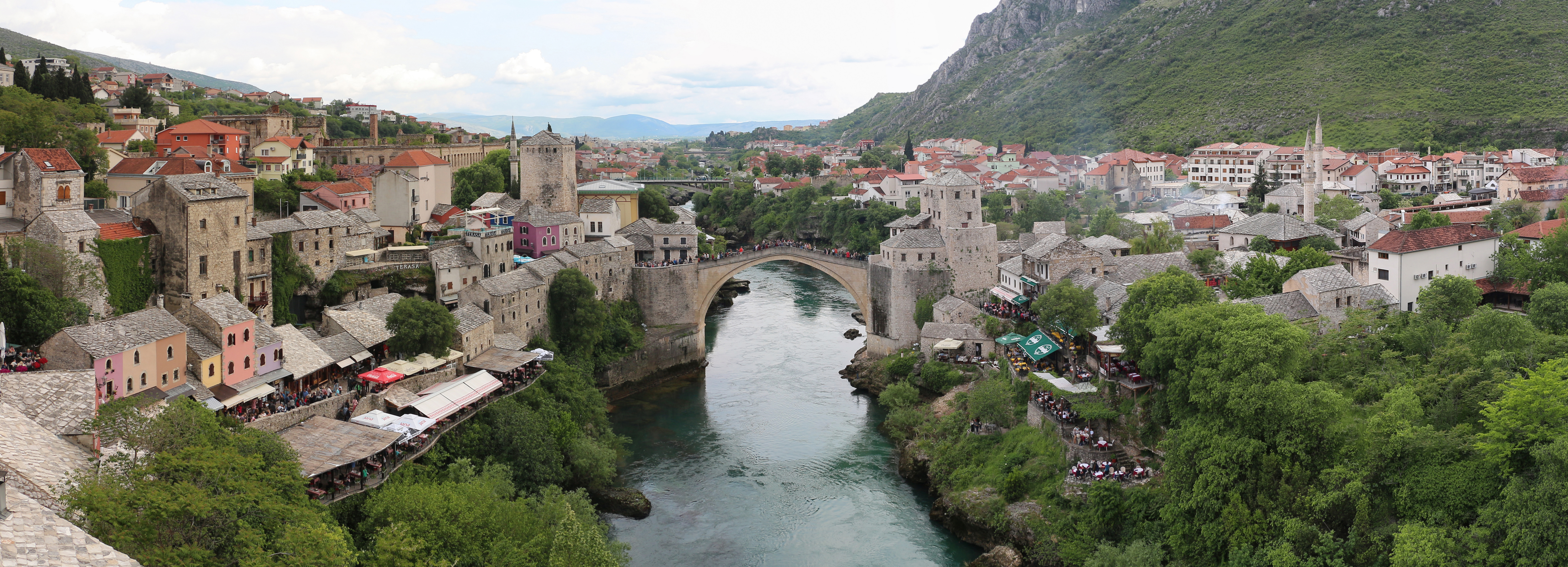
Stari Most is a 15th century Ottoman Architecture in Mostar.

== Demographics ==
According to the 1991 population census 267 Turks were living in Bosnia and Herzegovina, while the 2013 Bosnian census gave a number of 1,108, almost all in the Federation of Bosnia and Herzegovina (1,097 people). More than eighty percent of all Turks in Bosnia and Herzegovina live in the capital Sarajevo.

== Noble families ==
- Kadić family

== Notable people ==
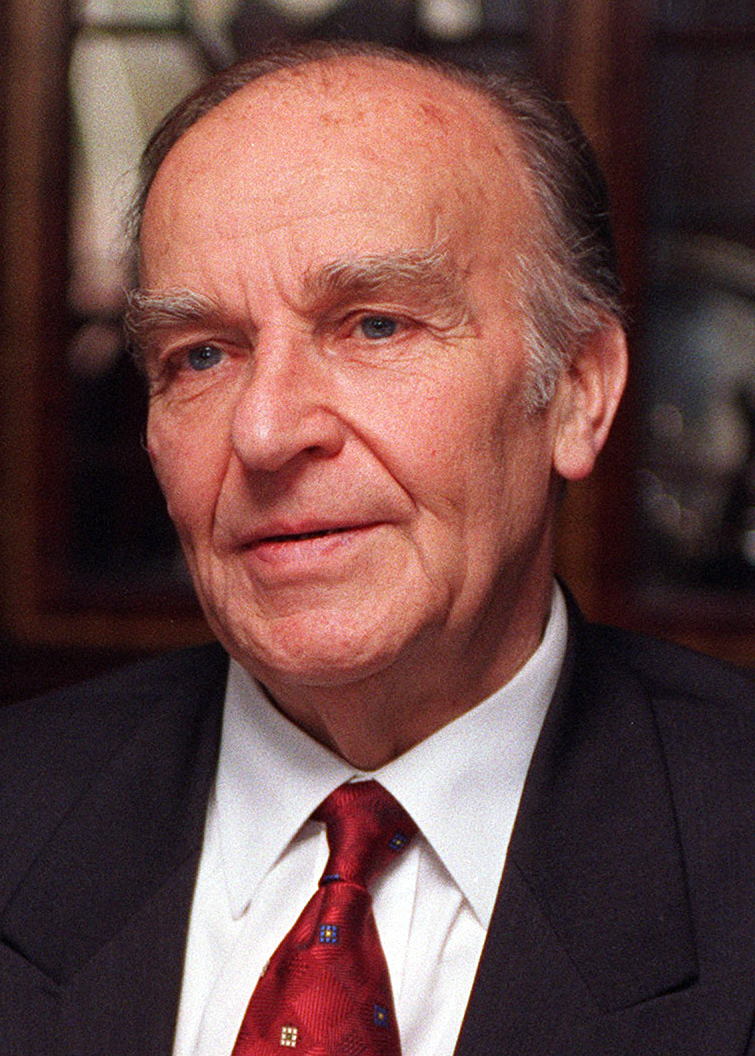
Alija Izetbegović was the first President of the Presidency of the Republic of Bosnia and Herzegovina. His grandmother was of Turkish origin and was from Üsküdar (formerly Scutari).

- Alija Izetbegović, president of the presidency of Bosnia and Herzegovina (Turkish grandmother)
  - children:
  - Bakir Izetbegović, politician
- Aldin Mustafić, a member of the Turkish minority in Bosnia and Herzegovina - wrote a book on the Bosnian language in Arabic script entitled "The Epochs of Arabic phonetic thoughts and Arebica", as part of the influence of Turkish culture in the region - i.e. in Bosnia and Herzegovina.
- Şükrü Âli Ögel, Turkish Army officer, politician
- Osman Asaf, painter
- Salih Turgay, politician
- Derviš Korkut, Bosnia and Herzegovina librarian, teacher, humanist and orientalist, he comes from a well-known family of ulema who emigrated from Turkey to Bosnia in the 16th century.
- Senad Hadžifejzović, Bosnian journalist, news anchor and TV host

== See also ==
- Bosnia and Herzegovina–Turkey relations
- Turkish minorities in the former Ottoman Empire
  - Turks in the Balkans
  - Turks in the Arab world
- History of Bosnia and Herzegovina (1463–1878)
- Ottoman Bosnian families
- Islam in Bosnia and Herzegovina
- Muhacir
- Bosniaks in Turkey
