= Zulfikarpašić =

Zulfikarpašić (Serbian Cyrillic: Зулфикарпашић) is a surname. Notable people with the surname include:

- Adil Zulfikarpašić (1921–2008), Bosnian politician
- Bojan Zulfikarpašić (born 1968), Serbian jazz pianist
