= Bosniaks in Turkey =

Türkiye'deki Boşnaklar
- Ethnic flag of Bosniaks in Turkey

Total population
- 106,000
- 2,000,000 (Bosniak ancestry)

Regions with significant populations
- Marmara region, Aegean Region

Languages
- Bosnian, Turkish

Religion
- Sunni Islam

Bosniaks in Turkey (Bosnian: Bošnjaci u Turskoj / Бошњаци у Турској) are citizens of Turkey who are, or descend from, ethnic Bosniak people, originating in Bosnia and Herzegovina and other former Yugoslav republics.

The Bosniak community in Turkey has its origins predominantly in the exodus of Bosniaks from the Bosnia Eyalet taking place in the 19th and early 20th century as a result of the collapse of the Ottoman Empire's rule in the Balkans. According to estimates commissioned in 2008 by the National Security Council of Turkey (Milli Güvenlik Kurulu) as many as 2,000,000 Turkish citizens are of Bosniak ancestry. Bosniaks mostly live in the Marmara region which is in other words the north-west of Turkey. The biggest Bosniak community in Turkey is in Istanbul. Yenibosna ("New Bosnia") is a borough, located on the western part of the Istanbul district of Bahçelievler, bordering with the neighboring district Küçükçekmece. The district saw rapid migration from the former Ottoman Empire after the founding of the Republic of Turkey. The origin of the borough's name comes from the capital of Bosnia and Herzegovina, Sarajevo. The settlement was initially named Saraybosna, which is the Turkish equivalent of Sarajevo, before it was renamed Yenibosna with the formation of the Republic of Turkey.

There are notable Bosniak communities in Istanbul (Bayrampaşa), İzmir, Karamürsel, Yalova, Bursa and Edirne.

== Numbers ==
Bosnian-speaking population in Turkey
Year	As first language	As second language	Total	Turkey's population	% of total speakers
1935	24,615	13,526	38,141	16,157,450	0.24
1945	10,900	9,599	20,499	18,790,174	0.11
1950	24,013	0	24,013	20,947,188	0.11
1955	11,844	12,669	24,513	24,064,763	0.10
1960	14,570	37,526	52,096	27,754,820	0.19
1965	17,627	39,589	52,209	31,391,421	0.18

In the census of 1965, those who spoke Bosnian as first language were proportionally most numerous in Kocaeli (1.2%), Sakarya (0.7%), Kırklareli (0.4%) and İzmir (0.2%).

There are currently an estimated 106,000 Turkish citizens identifying as Bosniaks.

== Notable people ==
- Banu Alkan, actress
- Barış Falay, actor (Maternal side)
- Begüm Kütük, actress (Maternal side)
- Berk Hakman, actor (Bosniak descendant)
- Birkan Sokullu, actor (Bosniak descendant)
- Bülent Ecevit, politician, served as the Prime Minister of Turkey four times (Maternal side)
- Çagatay Ulusoy, actor (Maternal side)
- Cem Cengiz Uzan, businessman
- Erdem Şanlı, actor
- Erkan Baş, politician (Bosniak descendant)
- Farah Zeynep Abdullah, actress (Grandparents)
- Fatih Artman, actor
- Furkan Andıç, actor (Maternal side)
- Kaan Yıldırım, actor, producer (Maternal side)
- Kıvanç Tatlıtuğ, famed actor (Paternal side, Bosniak and Albanian)
- Meliha İsmailoğlu, national volleyball team player
- Sabiha Gökçen, the first female combat pilot (Both paternal and maternal side)
- Seda Bakan, actress (Paternal side)
- Sedef Avcı, actress (Maternal Side)
- Uğur Demirok, former footballer
- Tarik Biberovic, NBA player

== See also ==
- Bosnia and Herzegovina–Turkey relations
- Turks in Bosnia and Herzegovina
