= Sermet Erkin =

- Born: 1957 (age 67–68); Karamürsel, Kocaeli, Turkey
- Occupation: performer of stage magic
- Website: www.sermeterkin.com

Sermet Erkin (born 1957) is a well-known Turkish stage magician, journalist and former theatre actor.

== Early years ==
Sermet Erkin was born in Karamürsel town of Kocaeli Province in 1957. His name was given by the husband of famous singer Safiye Ayla. He had an older brother Mehmet Saffet.

Erkin's family moved to Istanbul, to a street in the neighborhood of the renowned stage magician Zati Sungur's home. He was schooled in Nişantaşı, Istanbul in 1964. After finishing the high school, he entered Istanbul University's Faculty of Letters. In the beginning, he studied Turkish Literature, graduated later from the History of Philosophy Department.

== Career ==
Erkin was interested from his childhood on in all kinds of stage arts in addition to stage magic, he was inspired by Zati Sungur. His acting career began when he joined Istanbul City Theatres, where he performed in various plays until 1977. He appeared in the children's theatre play Karagözcü ile Sihirbaz ("Karagöz Player and the Magician"), which was written by Yalçın Akçay specially in respect of Erkin's stage magic skill. The work earned wider attention because it was the first children's play, which debuted with a gala performance. He continued acting on stage a while after forming his own theatre company. Today, he is still in contact with theatre, organizing theatre festivals.

Erkin's mentor was Zati Sungur, international recognized Turkish stage magician. At the age of nineteen, he began a professional career in stage magic in Zürich, Switzerland, where he was on visit to his niece. After a magic show he performed for neighbor's children during the Easter festival, he was discovered by a Swiss variety manager, who arranged a magic show job for him in a well-known night club. After his return home, he continued to perform shows on stage and television. He toured across Turkey, ln European countries and USA. He appeared more than eighteen years in "Kervansaray", a popular night club in Istanbul, where also his wife Nuray performed folk songs. Erkin makes still appearances also for children in schools.

From 1976 on, Sermet Erkin wrote columns on children in newspapers Hürriyet, Milliyet, Sabah and Günaydın. Later, he worked as editorial director for a children's magazine.

== Family life ==
In 1986, Sermet Erkin married to Nuray, a folk music singer. They have a son İsmail Sermet and a daughter Piraye Nazlı. He moved to his hometown Karamürsel in 1998.
