= Karamürsel =

- District and municipality
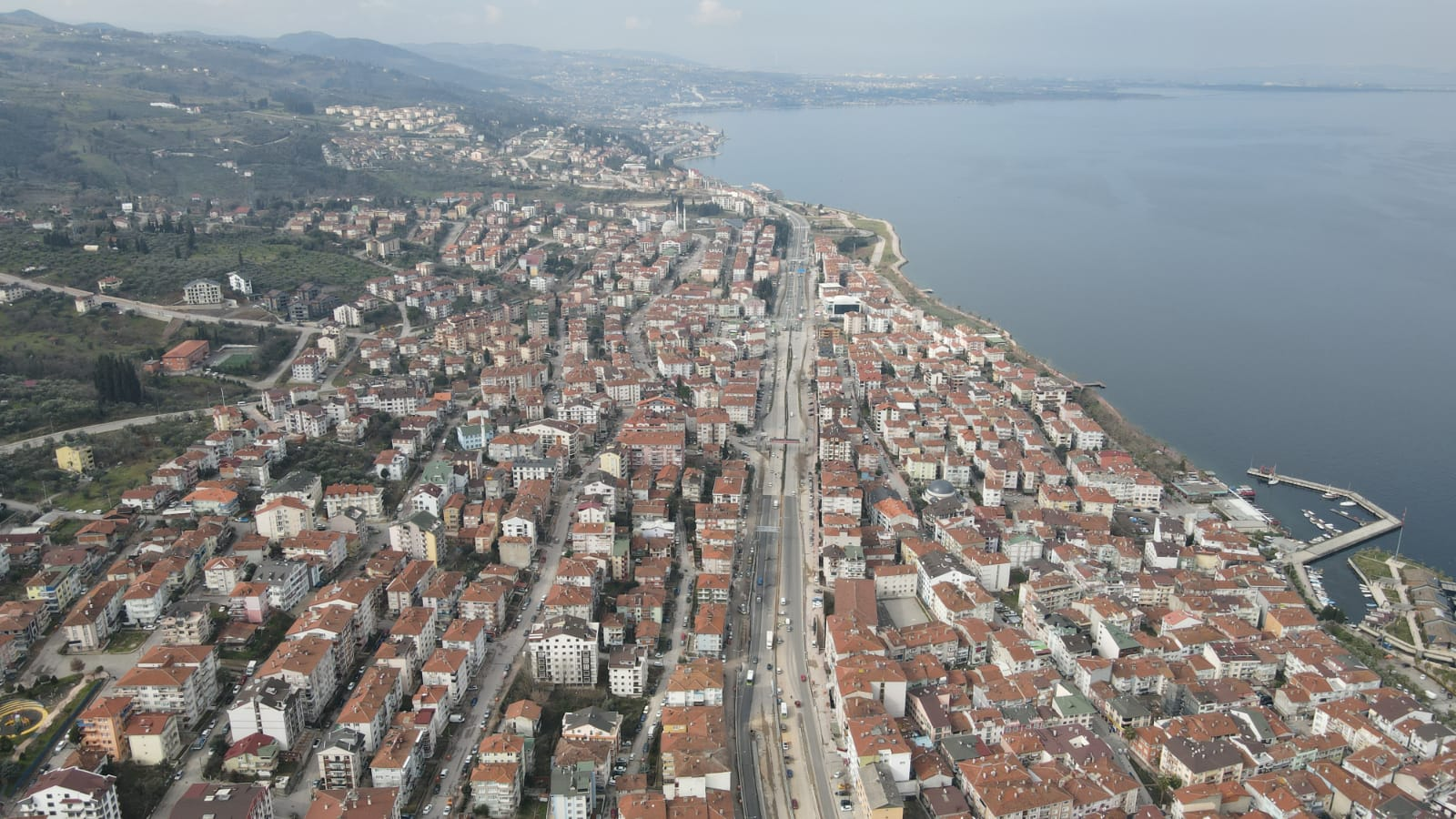
- General view of Karamürsel

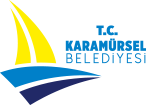
- Logo

- Map showing Karamürsel District in Kocaeli Province

- Location within Turkey Location within Marmara
- Coordinates: 40°41′21″N 29°36′54″E
- Country: Turkey
- Province: Kocaeli

Government
  - Mayor: Ahmet Çalık (CHP)
- Area: 262 km^{2} (101 sq mi)
- Population (2022): 59,676
  - Density: 228/km^{2} (590/sq mi)
- Time zone: UTC+3 (TRT)
- Postal code: 41500
- Area code: 0262
- Website: www.karamursel.bel.tr

Karamürsel is a municipality and district of Kocaeli Province, Turkey. Its area is 262 km^{2}, and its population is 59,676 (2022). It is on the south coast of the Gulf of Izmit. Before its conquest by the Ottomans it used to be called by the Greek name of Praenetos (Πραινετός in Greek). The modern name commemorates Kara Mürsel Bey who founded the Ottoman Navy and designed distinctive galley ships, called kadırgas, for it.

Karamürsel holds special significance for the Turkish Navy, as it was here in 1323 that the Ottoman Empire first established an outlet to the sea, thus laying the foundations for the Ottoman Navy which would go on to dominate the eastern Mediterranean for several centuries.

The Karamürsel area is not as heavily industrialised as other parts of Kocaeli province.

Ferry services link Karamürsel to Izmit on the eastern end and Hereke on the northern side of the Bay of Izmit.

== Recent history and population ==
According to the Ottoman General Census of 1881/82-1893, the kaza of Karamürsel had a total population of 25,322, consisting of 11,023 Greeks, 10,732 Muslims, 3,549 Armenians and 18 foreign citizens.

The district was occupied by British forces for a few hours on June 25, 1920 that ended with a forced withdrawal caused by the Turkish National Struggle troops. It consequently faced an initial Greek landing operation attempt on July 11, 1920, and an occupation by Greek forces on October 23, 1920 as part of the Greco-Turkish War. Greek troops set a part of the town on fire and caused heavy damage, even destroying mosques and their minarets. On July 4, 1921, the district was liberated from enemy occupation by Turkish troops. The Hacımehmet neighborhood of the city was renamed "4 Temmuz" (4th of July) to commemorate the day of liberation, which stands as a major symbol and turning point for the district. July 4th is celebrated enthusiastically every year with festivities and events.

In 1923 the Greeks were obliged to leave Turkey under the terms of the Treaty of Lausanne that concluded the Turkish War of Independence.

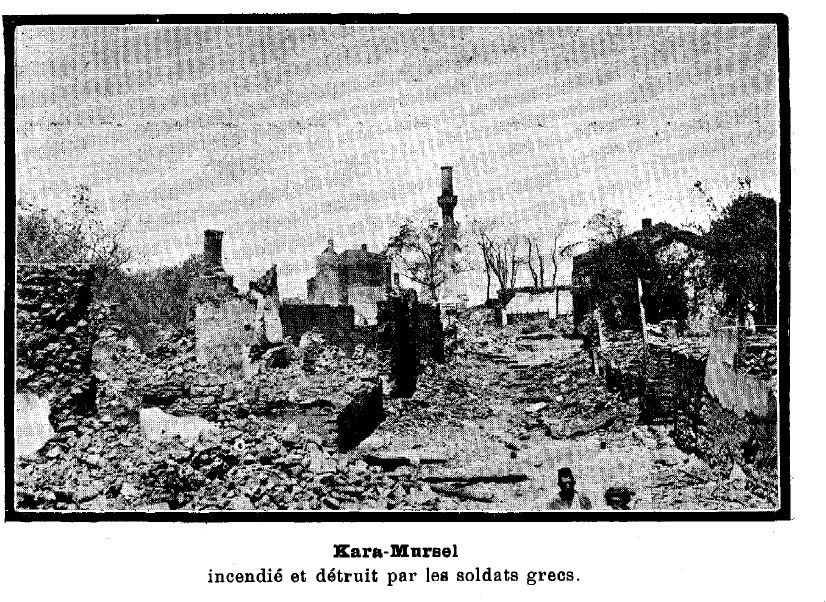
Karamursel ruins, photo dated 1921, reads in French: burned and destroyed by Greek soldiers

Today the people living in Karamürsel and its villages are mainly Muslim Manav Turks and immigrants known as muhacir in Turkish. Some of these immigrants arrived from Bosnia-Herzegovina, Bulgaria, Romania, North Macedonia, Lazistan, Georgia, Circassia and Crimea during and after the fall of Ottoman Empire; a particularly large number of Bosniaks settled in the area after the 1877-78 Russo-Turkish war. Many Muslim refugees from all around the Ottoman Empire settled in the region and this ethnic structure has resulted in a culture influenced by that of the Balkans and Caucasus. More recently Karamürsel has also attracted settlers from other parts of Turkey, especially the Black Sea Region.

== The 1999 İzmit Earthquake ==
Karamürsel was badly damaged on 17 August 1999 during the devastating İzmit earthquake, which rocked the eastern part of the Marmara Region. in Karamürsel alone 164 people lost their lives and many were left homeless. After the earthquake many people left for other parts of Turkey and Karamürsel resembled a ghost-town over the winter of 1999. Since then houses have been repaired and business reopened. During the earthquake, a tsunami struck both sides of the Bay of İzmit in about a single minute. Although the tsunami was not particularly large, substantial portions of the towns of Gölcük, Degirmendere and Karamürsel were inundated by the sea (Altinok et al., 1999). The coast of Karamürsel has now been repaired and reconstructed. There is a monument to those who died on the waterfront in Karamürsel.

== The military ==
Karamürsel has a long history as an important naval base. The first Ottoman shipyard was built in Karamürsel in 1327. The ships built there formed the nucleus of the first Ottoman Naval Forces.

=== American base ===
Due to its strategic and naturally protected location, Karamürsel has been used as a naval base to help control access to the Black Sea. During the Cold War a U.S. military base was also located in Karamürsel for many years to intercept Russian radio transmissions. The station, containing a 500-foot-diameter antenna array AN/FLR-9, called Elephant Cage, was in place from 1957 until 1979; this huge landmark was visible from everywhere in Karamürsel, from villages on the hills surrounding the town and even from the shores across the Bay of Izmit. In 1975, Turkey took control of the U.S. intelligence‐gathering base. After the US military left the base was transferred to the Turkish Navy and is still in operation today. However, the US military removed an important chip from the antenna so that it would not be used after they left. The antenna was demolished in the mid-1990s.

In 1958, a USDESEA Educational System school for the dependents of the U.S. military opened at the Karamürsel Air Station Starting as an elementary school, it was expanded to take middle school students and eventually both junior and senior high school students. In 1961, a new school building was constructed and served the educational needs of the military personnel's children until the base itself closed in 1979.

In addition to the students who lived on the base with their parents, the American dependents' school at the Karamürsel Air Station (KCDI) became a regional boarding school that took students from grades nine through twelve. High-school-aged students whose parents were stationed in other Turkish locations, those stationed in Iraklion Air Station in Crete, and the children of civilian federal employees working for the VOA (Voice of America) radio station in Xanthi, Greece then attended high school in Karamürsel.

== Composition ==
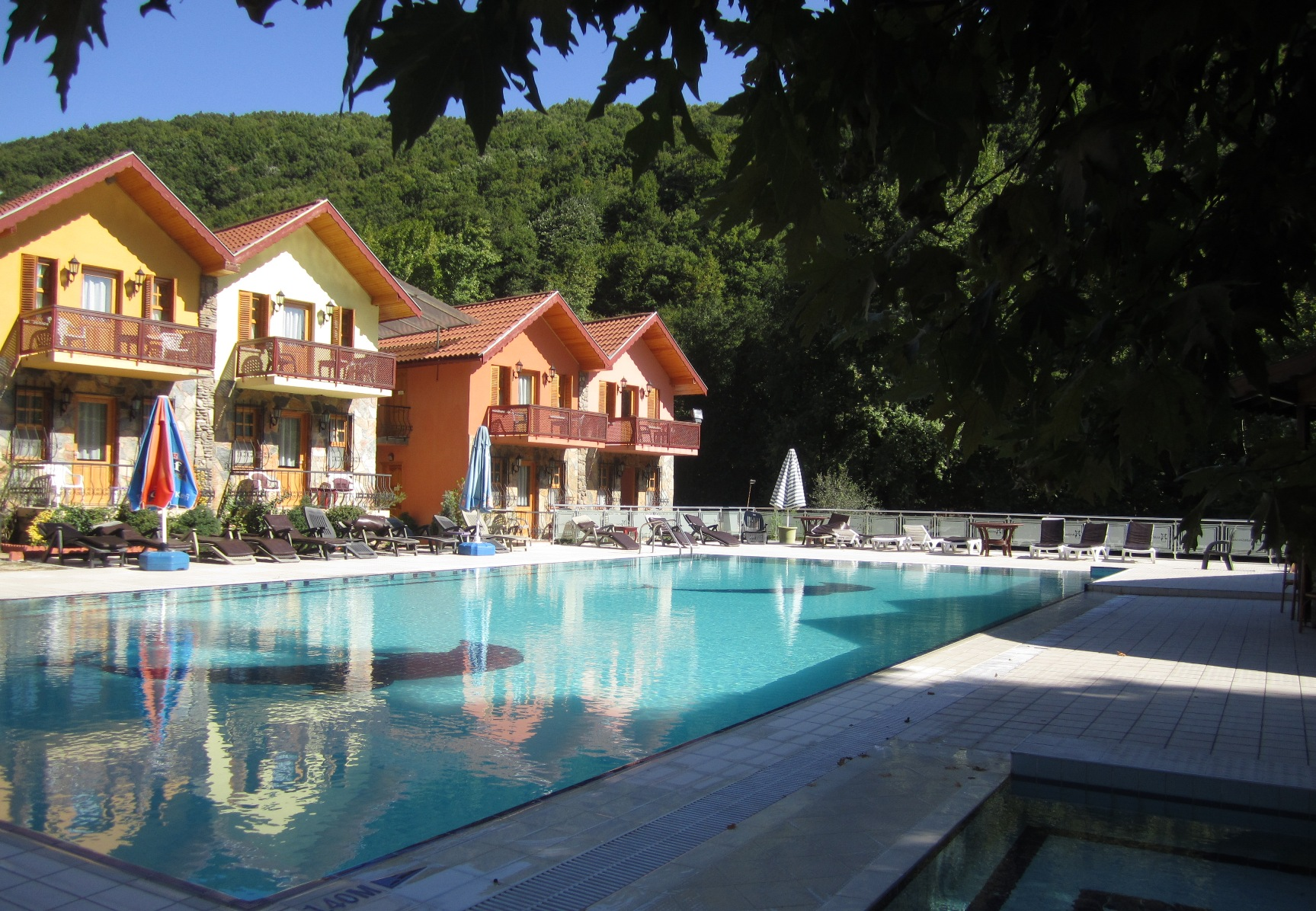
A hotel near İhsaniye, called Başdeğirmen Alabalik Tesisleri

There are 28 neighbourhoods in Karamürsel District:

- 4 Temmuz
- Akçat
- Akçat Merkez
- Akpınar
- Avcıköy
- Çamçukur
- Çamdibi
- Dereköy
- Ereğli
- Fulacık
- Hayriye
- İhsaniye
- İnebeyli
- Kadriye
- Karaahmetli
- Karapınar
- Kayacık
- Kızderbent
- Oluklu
- Osmaniye
- Pazarköy
- Safiye
- Semetler
- Senaiye
- Suludere
- Tahtalı
- Tepeköy
- Yalakdere

== Sport ==
The 2012 European Junior Open Water Swimming Championships were held in Karamürsel, with 117 swimmers from 21 countries taking part.

== Notable natives ==
- Hakan Arıkan (born 1982), footballer for Kayserispor
- Necdet Calp (1922-1998), civil servant and politician
- Merih Demiral (born 1998), footballer for Juventus
- Sermet Erkin (born 1957), stage magician
- Gazanfer Bilge, Wrestler

== Twin towns – sister cities ==
- Schwandorf, Germany

== See also ==
- Caramoussal
- Bosniaks in Turkey
