= Ante Nikšić =

Croatian lawyer and politician

Croatian Ambassador to Italy
- In office April 1943 – December 1943
- Preceded by: Stijepo Perić
- Succeeded by: unclear

2nd Minister of Internal Affairs of the Independent State of Croatia
- In office 10 October 1942 – 29 April 1943
- Leader: Ante Pavelić
- Preceded by: Andrija Artuković
- Succeeded by: Andrija Artuković

Personal details
- Born: 8 June 1892 Gospić, Croatia-Slavonia, Austria-Hungary
- Died: 28 January 1962 (aged 69) Pilar, Buenos Aires Province, Argentina
- Party: Ustashe (until 1945)
- Other political affiliations: Party of Rights (until 1929)
- Relations: Vittorio Ambrosio (son-in-law) Adil Zulfikarpašić (son-in-law)
- Education: University of Zagreb University of Vienna
- Occupation: Politician
- Profession: Lawyer

Ante Nikšić (8 June 1892 – 28 January 1962) was a Croatian lawyer and politician who served as Minister of Interior of the Independent State of Croatia between 1942 and 1943.

== Early life ==
Nikšić was born in Gospić in Croatian region of Lika. He attended high school in Gospić. Nikšić studied law at the University of Vienna and at the Faculty of Law, University of Zagreb where he gained the title of doctor of law. As a student, he was member of the Party of Right's youth organization and was the president of "Kvaternik" club and of the students' support society. After he left university he worked as a judge in Gospić and Zagreb, and later worked as a lawyer in Vukovar. In Vukovar, he was an editor of local newspaper of the Croatian Union, and later the newspaper of the Croatian Bloc during the 1925 elections, after which he worked as a judge in such regions as Jastrebarsko, Ivanec and Karlovac, where he became President of the Karlovac Municipal Court and later President of the Judicial Table, a district court.

== Independent State of Croatia ==
As a President of the Judicial Table, Nikšić saw the collapse of the Kingdom of Yugoslavia and establishment of the Independent State of Croatia (NDH). He was a member of the Ustaše organization even before the war. After the NDH was proclaimed, he helped to organize the new state institutions in Karlovac. Ante Pavelić, while he was on his way to Zagreb from Italy, stayed in Ante Nikšić's home for two days and there received the German envoy Edmund Veesenmayer and Benito Mussolini's envoy Filippo Anfuso.

In June 1941, Nikšić was named Prefect of Pokuplje District. In mid-March 1942 he started to work for the Ministry of Interior. A month later, he was named envoy to the Ministry of Foreign Affairs. On 10 October 1942, Nikšić was named Minister of Interior, succeeding Andrija Artuković. He worked as a minister until 29 April 1943. After that, he was an ambassador to the Kingdom of Italy until middle December 1943. From Italy he returned to Zagreb where he again worked in the Ministry of Interior.

== Emigration ==
At the beginning of May 1945, at the end of the war, he was abroad, so after the collapse of the Independent State of Croatia in May 1945, he fled to Argentina where he lived in Pilar, not far from Buenos Aires. In Argentina, Nikšić wrote for the Croatian émigré magazine, Hrvatska revija. He died in Pilar, aged 69.
