= Muhamed Filipović =

Bosnian academic and philosopher (1929–2020)

- Born: 3 August 1929; Banja Luka, Kingdom of Serbs, Croats, and Slovenes
- Died: 26 February 2020 (aged 90); Sarajevo, Bosnia and Herzegovina
- Resting place: Bare Cemetery, Sarajevo
- Education: University of Sarajevo (BA, MA, PhD)
- Occupations: Historian; philosopher; academic; writer
- Children: 4

Muhamed Filipović (3 August 1929 – 26 February 2020) was a Bosnian academic, writer, essayist, theorist and philosopher. As a young man he took part in the communist takeover of power and Yugoslav Partisans in 1945. He worked as a professor at the Faculty of Humanities at the University of Sarajevo.

Some authors see him as one of the leading late 20th and early 21st century Bosniak academics.

== Early life ==
Filipović was born on 3 August 1929 in Banja Luka, Bosnia and Herzegovina, then a part of the Kingdom of Yugoslavia to Sulejman Filipović and his wife Đula. His mother's first cousins were Džafer and Osman Kulenović.

He bore the surname Filipović, not only after his father but also after his mother. The Filipović family from his paternal side hail from Glamoč, Bosnia and Herzegovina.

== Career ==
Filipović graduated from the Faculty of Humanities of the University of Sarajevo and received his doctorate in 1960. He was a member and vice-president of the Academy of Sciences and Arts of Bosnia and Herzegovina. He was also president of the Bosniak Academy of Sciences and Arts.

Filipović worked as a professor at the Faculty of Humanities in Sarajevo. He published 56 books, some of which have been translated into other languages. His book “Lenin – A Monograph of His Thought” has been translated into Danish, Swedish, French, Bulgarian, Slovak, Italian and Chinese.

Filipović was a founder and leader of the Muslim Bosniak Organisation (MBO).

During the beginnings of the Party of Democratic Action (SDA) in 1990, the party also included a very influential secular nationalist grouping, led by Filipović and Adil Zulfikarpašić. Filipović led a delegation and negotiated both with presidents of Croatia and Slovenia, republics within Socialist Federal Republic of Yugoslavia, who invited Bosnia and Herzegovina to join them on the planned path to secession, and later in June 1991, on behalf of SDA president Alija Izetbegović, Zulfikarpašić and Filipović met with Serb Democratic Party (SDS) president Radovan Karadžić, Nikola Koljević and Momčilo Krajišnik to discuss the future status of SR Bosnia and Herzegovina. He then met with representatives of Serbia who invited Bosnia to stay. Both proposals were rejected by Bosniak leaders at the time. Filipović considered especially tragic that the proposal to stay in Yugoslavia together with Macedonia, Serbia and Montenegro was rejected by Alija Izetbegović, after negotiations with Slobodan Milošević, who agreed to all of his numerous demands - from Bosniak president and army chief of Yugoslavia to preserving unity of Bosnia within Yugoslavia.

During the Bosnian War and the Bosnian genocide, Filipović served as Bosnia and Herzegovina's ambassador to the United Kingdom.

== Death ==
On 26 February 2020, Filipović died in Sarajevo, Bosnia and Herzegovina, aged 90. He was buried in Sarajevo at the Bare Cemetery on 28 February, two days after his death.
