= Muhamed Čengić =

Bosniak politician (1942–2020)

Muhamed Čengić (1942 – 26 October 2020) was a Bosniak politician who served as Vice President of the Government of the Republic of Bosnia and Herzegovina.

Čengić was born in Miljevina in Foča in a family of seven children. His father was Haki Bey an imam. After attending a four-grade elementary school in his hometown, in 1953 Čengić continued his education in Sarajevo, where he finished 5th, 6th and 7th grade. He again returned to Foča, where he graduated from the elementary school and enrolled at the local five-grade gymnasium. After finishing three grades, the advanced students were given the opportunity to take exams for the last two grades jointly, thus becoming the first student from Foča to finish two grades in one year, graduating in 1960. After finishing gymnasium, Čengić enrolled at the Faculty of Machinery, University of Sarajevo. After graduating, he worked for Hermes and in 1975 started working for the Ljubljana-based Lesina company, where he worked until February 1991.

He was one of the founders of the Party of Democratic Action (SDA). In February 1992, during a session of the Parliamentary Assembly of the Socialist Republic of Bosnia and Herzegovina, Čengić held talks with the Serb representative Radovan Karadžić, discussing the regionalisation of Bosnia and Herzegovina based on economic, national and cultural principles. President of the SDA Alija Izetbegović encouraged him to go public with the proposal at the session, however, the proposal was met with strong opposition among the Bosnian Muslim representatives.

In 2010, he joined the Democratic People's Union.

Čengić died in Sarajevo and was buried at the Lav cemetery on 28 October 2020.
