= Vittorio Ambrosio =

Italian general (1879–1958)

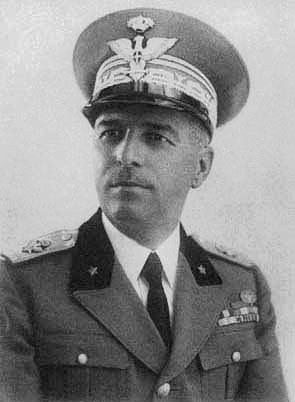

Chief of the Italian General Staff
- In office 1 February 1943 – 18 November 1943
- Preceded by: Ugo Cavallero
- Succeeded by: Giovanni Messe

Chief of Staff of the Royal Italian Army
- In office 20 January 1942 – 1 February 1943
- Preceded by: Mario Roatta
- Succeeded by: Ezio Rosi

Personal details
- Born: 28 July 1879 Turin, Kingdom of Italy
- Died: 19 November 1958 (aged 79) Alassio, Italy
- Relations: Ante Nikšić (father-in-law)
- Awards: Order of Saints Maurice and Lazarus; Military Order of Savoy

Military service
- Allegiance: Kingdom of Italy
- Branch/service: Royal Italian Army
- Years of service: 1896–1944
- Rank: General
- Commands: XII Army Corps; Second Army; Inspector-General of the Army; Chief of Staff of the Army; Chief of the General Staff
- Battles/wars: Italo-Turkish War; World War I World War II

Vittorio Ambrosio (28 July 1879 – 19 November 1958) was an Italian general who served in the Italo-Turkish War, World War I, and World War II. During the last phase of World War II Ambrosio supported the fall of Benito Mussolini and Italy's eventual renunciation of the German alliance.

== Before World War II ==
Ambrosio was a native of Turin. In 1896 he entered the Military School of Modena; on completion of his schooling he was commissioned as a cavalry officer. During the Italo-Turkish War (1911–1912) he served as a tenente (first lieutenant) in the Cavaleggeri di Lucca regiment. Ambrosio served as a divisional chief of staff during World War I. In 1935 he was appointed Commander XII Army Corps. By 1939 he had risen to command the Second Army, located on the Yugoslav border.

== World War II ==
Ambrosio's early actions in World War II included leading the Italian offensive during the Invasion of Yugoslavia in 1941. After brief but heavy fighting, the 2nd Army under his command attacked from the north reaching Ljubljana and the outskirts of Zadar by April 11. On 15 April, Ambrosio conquered Split and Kotor. By 17 April Ambrosio controlled the Dalmatian coast. Mussolini rewarded his success by appointing Ambrosio Chief of Staff of the Italian Army in January 1942.

As Chief of Army Staff, Ambrosio planned to return Italian troops from Ukraine and the Balkans. In February 1943, he became Chief of Staff of the entire armed forces. In May 1943, after a devastating loss at Tunis and the Allied invasion of Sicily, Ambrosio attempted to convince Mussolini to pull Italy out of the war and end the alliance with Germany. When Mussolini became unable to stand against Adolf Hitler, Ambrosio supported his removal from power. After Mussolini's fall in July, Ambrosio continued as Chief of Staff in Pietro Badoglio's military government. In September, Ambrosio helped negotiate an armistice with the Allies. The negotiations took longer than expected and allowed the Germans time to occupy much of Italy.

Ambrosio was eventually demoted to Inspector-General of the army by Badoglio in November 1943 on the insistence of the Allies, who did not trust him.

== Personal life ==
Ambrosio married a daughter of Croatian Minister of Interior, Ante Nikšić, in 1942.

== See also ==
- Royal Italian Army (1940–1946)
- Italian Co-Belligerent Army
