= Glavin =

Glavin is the surname of the following people

- Anthony Glavin (1945–2006), Irish poet and professor of music
- John Glavin (born 1944), British sprint canoer
- Matt Glavin, American politician
- Ronnie Glavin (born 1951), Scottish football midfielder
- Terry Glavin (born 1955), Canadian author and journalist
- Tony Glavin (born 1958), Scottish football midfielder

== See also ==
- Glavina
- Professor Frink, a character on The Simpsons who sometimes uses the word "glavin" as an exclamation
