= List of youngest parents =

This is a list of youngest parents, documenting cases in which individuals became parents at exceptionally early ages. Such cases have often attracted medical, legal, and public attention due to their rarity and the significant health risks and ethical considerations involved. This list is not comprehensive and only includes records or other historically notable cases.

== Youngest mothers ==
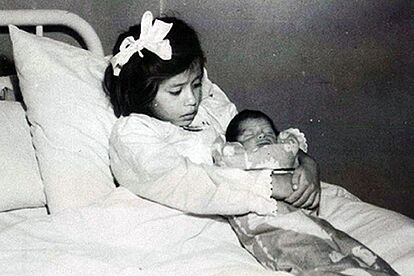
Lina Medina in 1939

=== Lina Medina ===
Lina Medina, a Peruvian girl, became the youngest confirmed mother in history when she gave birth to her son Gerardo on 14 May 1939 aged 5 years, 7 months, and 21 days. Based on the medical assessments of her pregnancy, she was four years old when she became pregnant, which was biologically possible due to precocious puberty. The father was not conclusively determined. Contemporary medical examiners and professional pediatricians heavily debated her true age, with some suggestions that she may have actually been 8 or 9 years old.

=== Yelizaveta "Liza" P. ===
In 1934, a girl named Yelizaveta "Liza" P. from Soviet Ukraine gave birth at 6 years old after being raped by her maternal grandfather. The baby, a girl, died in childbirth due to an umbilical cord problem though Liza survived. Her fate afterwards is unknown. Some sources incorrectly state her last name was Gryshchenko; this was in fact the name of the doctor who delivered the baby.

=== Unnamed girl ("H.") ===
On 18 March 1932, a girl known only as H., who was 6 years and 7 months old according to government records (though her father gave her age as 7 years) gave birth to a healthy baby girl in Delhi, India. The girl fully recovered and was able to nurse the baby for nine months.

=== Other notable cases ===
There have been extremely rare documented instances of girls giving birth at 8–10 years old. One of the most notable historical cases was Swiss girl Anna Mummenthaler, who gave birth to her daughter on 6 December 1759 aged 8 years, 9 months, and 29 days; reportedly the father was her uncle.

== Youngest fathers ==
Unlike the record for the youngest mother, the record for the youngest confirmed father has not been definitively published.

=== Hsi family ===
In 1910, Xue Zidao (薛子道), a 9-year-old boy in China was reported to have fathered a child with Li Fuzhen (李福珍), an 8-year-old girl. These are considered the youngest recorded parents in combined age. According to a 1957 Ripley's publication, the family name was Hsi and they were farmers in Amoy (Xiamen).

=== Amr ibn al-'Aas ===
Amr ibn al-'Aas, a sahaba (companion) of Prophet Muhammad, was widely remembered by fellow companions to have become a father at the age of around 11. Although the exact age (ranging from 10 to 13) remains disputed, his likely pre-teen parenthood is supported by several reliable sources.

=== Alberto S. ===
In 2015, a boy from the Mexican state of Chiapas fathered a child at 11 years old. The boy had been sold by his parents to another family at 10 years old in exchange for some cattle, and he was forced to live with a 16-year-old girl who became the mother of his child. Telemundo stated he "could be the youngest father in the world".

=== Other notable cases ===
In 2001, state records showed that the youngest father in Illinois was 10 years old, and in 2009, that the youngest father in North Dakota was 11 years old. However, further information about these cases is not available.

There have been rare documented instances of 12-year-old boys fathering children, with notable examples including a boy from the United Kingdom in 1998 and a boy from Kerala, India in 2017.

== Youngest grandmothers ==
=== Mum-Zi ===
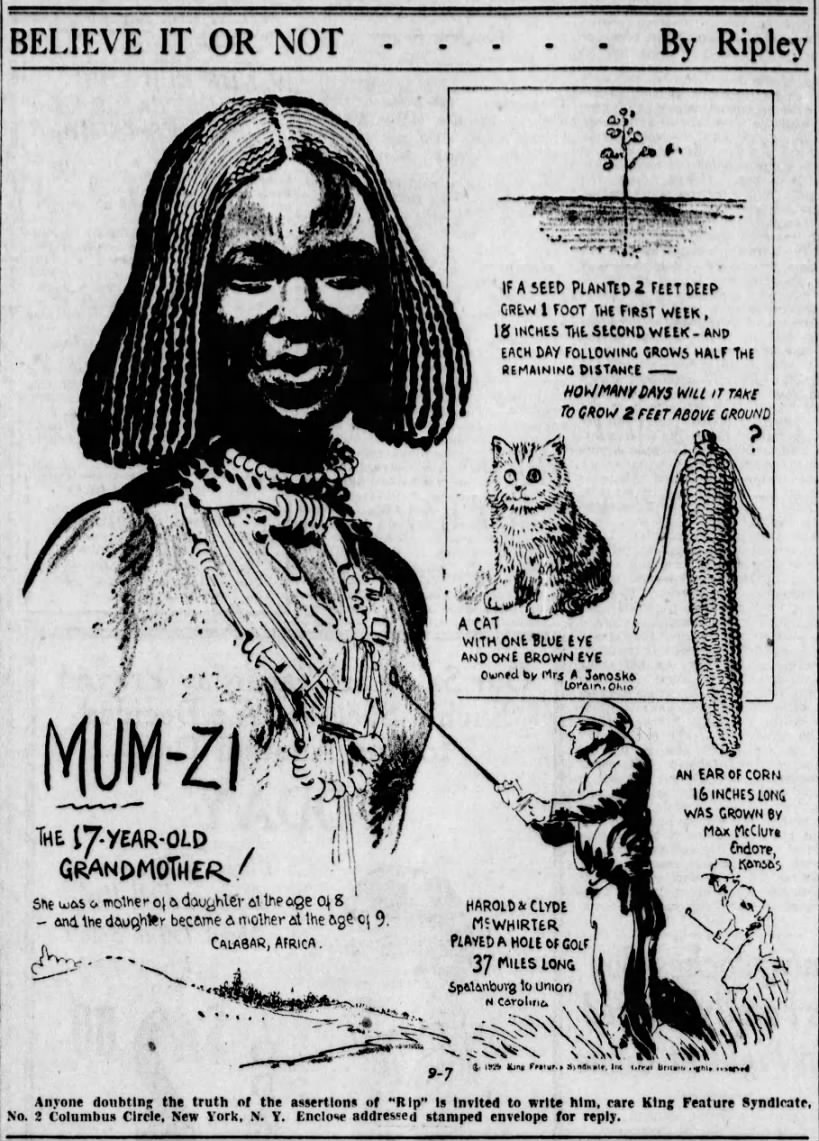
September 1929 Ripley's "Believe It or Not" feature with Mum-Zi

Mum-Zi was a Nigerian girl who is said to have been the youngest known grandmother in history, at 17 years old. The first written source that is known to have reported on Mum-Zi was a syndicated Ripley's Believe It or Not! newspaper feature in September 1929. The story was published with a few additional details in "The New Believe It or Not!" in 1931, Ripley's second Believe It or Not volume. Subsequent sources about her life have contained similar information as Ripley's accounts; the extent of independent corroboration is unclear as there were no official medical or birth records at the time.

According to the story, Mum-Zi was from the island of Calabar in Nigeria. At the age of seven, she was forced to join the harem of the island's ruler, Chief Akkiri, and shortly after became pregnant. She gave birth at age eight years and four months to a healthy baby girl. Mum-Zi's daughter was also forced into the harem and gave birth at eight or nine years old (sources vary, with Ripley saying nine in the original 1929 article, and eight in subsequent books), making Mum-Zi a grandmother at age 17. Some sources have claimed Mum-Zi was raised a Muslim, or gave birth in 1884, details which did not appear in Ripley's original story.

=== Other notable cases ===
There have been rare documented instances of women becoming grandmothers in their twenties, with a notable example including an unidentified woman from Rotherham, United Kingdom, who became a grandmother at 26 years old as her 12-year-old daughter gave birth on 26 August 1999.

A Romanian woman from the Romani community was widely reported to have become a grandmother at age 23; information about this case originated from the British tabloid press in 2011 and independent confirmation is unknown.

== Other records ==
Claims for the youngest grandfather in the world have not been reliably published.

Guinness World Records lists the youngest great-great-great grandmother as Canadian Harriet Holmes (aged 88 years 50 days on 8 March 1987) and the youngest great-great-great-great grandmother as American Augusta Bunge (aged 109 years 100 days on 21 January 1989).

== Occurrence of pre-teen parenthood ==
Available data indicates that pre-teen pregnancy is significantly rarer than teen pregnancy. A UNICEF study of Thailand between 2004 and 2013 found 938 registered births from mothers aged 10–12, compared to 28,605 from mothers aged 13–14. The CDC recorded the 2016 birth rate of girls aged 10–12 in the United States as 0.11 per 10,000, compared to 1.80 for age 13 and 9.30 for age 14.

== See also ==
- List of oldest mothers
- List of oldest fathers
