= Čengić family =

Noble Ottoman Bosnian family

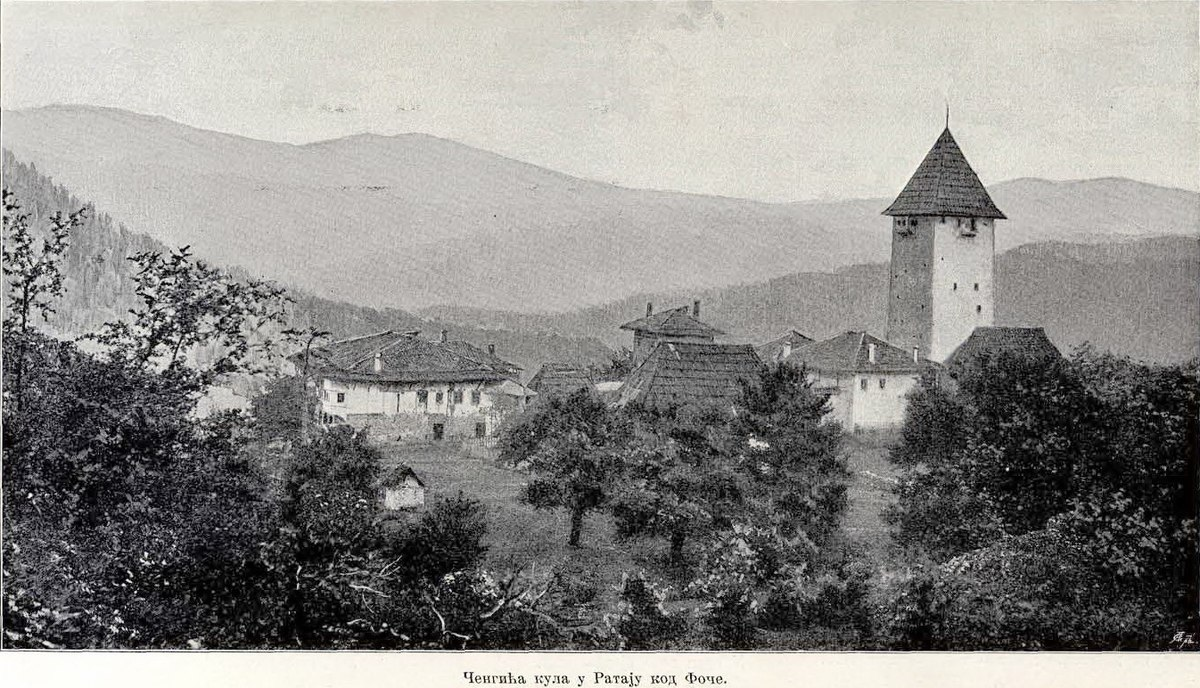
Čengić fortress in Rataje, near Miljevina, Foča

The Čengić family (Serbo-Croatian: Čengići) was a noble Ottoman Bosnian family that produced several notable lords in the Bosnia Eyalet of the Ottoman Empire.

== Origins ==
The family is of ethnic Turkoman origin and originates from Eğil, in present-day Turkey. Their paternal ancestor is İsfendiyar Bey who was a free vassal of Aq Quyunlu's Abul-Muzaffar. In 1498, Abul-Muzaffar freed İsfendiyar Bey's Eğil from paying taxes. In 1518 Selim I of the Ottomans conquered the Aq Qoyunlu's territory, including Eğil and expelled all the noble families, including İsfendiyar Bey who moved to Çankırı near Ankara, where he received a ziamet. Between 1498 and 1637 there are no records of his kin.

The oral tradition states that a descendant of İsfendiyar Bey, Kara Osman, arrived to Bosnia Eyalet in the 16th century. They were known after his hometown of Çankırı, first as Čangrlić and then Čengić. Kara Osman received a ziamet in Borje, Foča. The oldest written record of the family comes from Evliya Çelebi who between 1664 and 1665 mentions a graveyard in Zagorje where ancestors of Ali Pasha Čengić were buried.

== Notable members ==
- Ali Pasha Čengić (fl. 1840), military commander
- Bećir Pasha Čengić (fl. 1737), military commander
- Ded Agha Čengić (1823–1874), military commander, son of Smail-aga
- Džafer Pasha Čengić (fl. 1777), lord
- Smail Agha Čengić (1780–1840), lord (agha and mütesellim) and military commander, son of Ibrahim
- Zulfikar Pasha Čengić (died 1846), military commander
