= Kara Mürsel =

Ottoman admiral

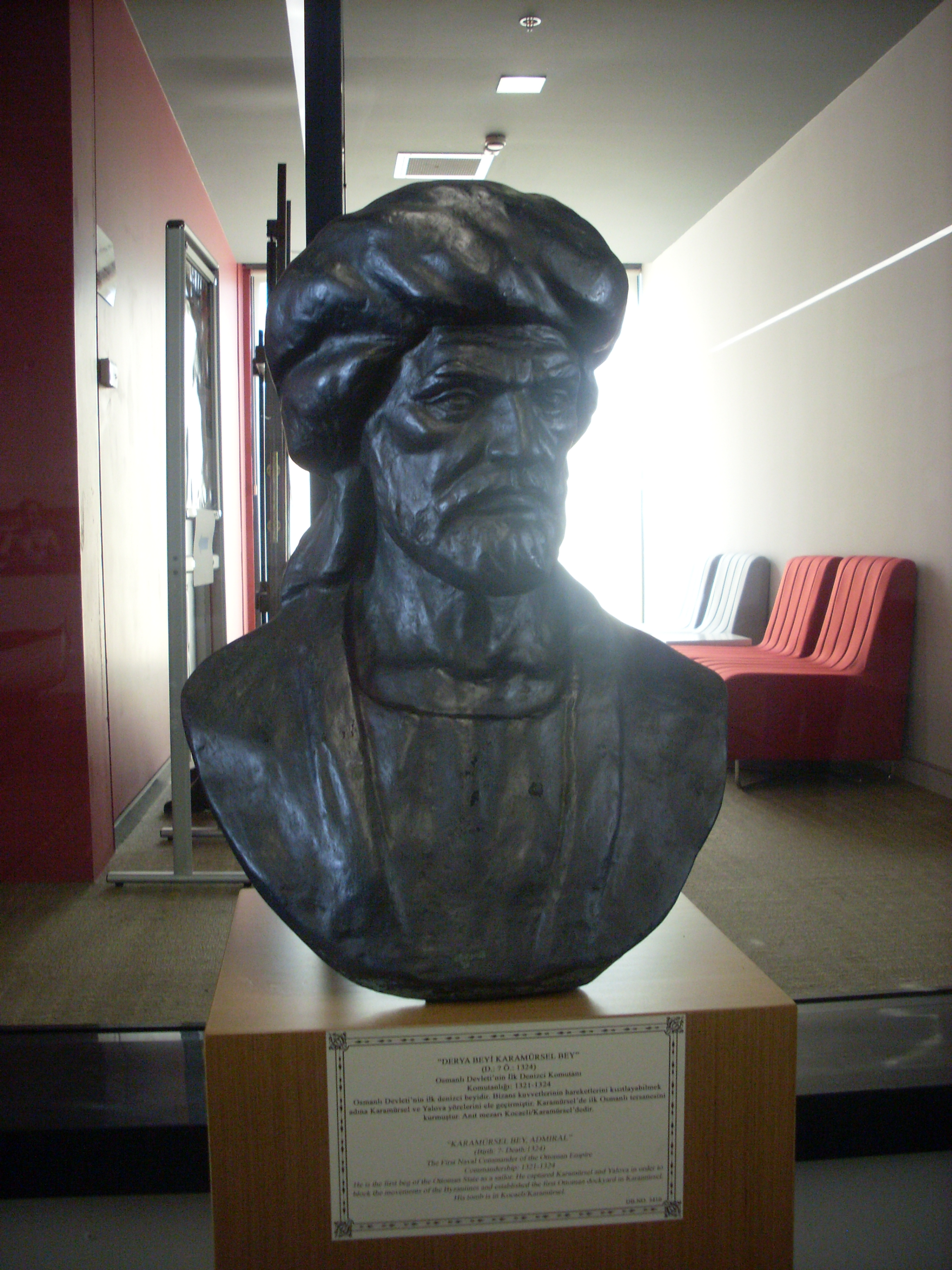
The bust of Kara Mürsel Bey at Istanbul Naval Museum

Kara Mürsel Bey, born Mürsel Alp, was a Turkish mariner, admiral, and Kaptan-ı Derya (Grand Admiral).

Due to the heroism he displayed in battle, he was known by the epithet "Kara"—meaning bold or fearless. Kara Mürsel Bey—who played a pivotal role during the formative years of the Ottoman State and was the first admiral and naval architect of the Ottoman Turks—established a naval base and shipyard in Karamürsel. There, he began to project naval power using the "light fleet" (ince donanma) he had created. He designed the "Karamürsel Ship," a vessel belonging to the çektiri class.

He was initially in the service of the Karesioğulları. At the request of Orhan Gazi, he entered Ottoman service. By capturing Karamürsel in 1324 or 1326, he enabled the Ottomans to establish a foothold on the southern shores of the Gulf of Izmit. In keeping with the custom of the time, the conquered town was named after him. The town and its surrounding area were organized into a naval administrative district (kaptanlık sancağı), and Kara Mürsel Bey was appointed to its administration. Aşık Paşazade's The History of Osmanoğulları provides the following information regarding Kara Mürsel Bey: There was a valiant and brave warrior named Kara Mürsel. Iznikmid was assigned to him, and its territory was allocated to him as a timar (fief). He positioned his timar troops along the coast to intercept and prevent any ships sailing from Istanbul from causing harm or launching attacks.

Kara Mürsel Bey established a light naval force—comprising swift vessels named after him—and secured control over the Sea of Marmara. By stationing his fleet at the entrance of the gulf, he cut off maritime reinforcements sent from Byzantium to Izmit (Nicomedia), playing a pivotal role in the city's rapid capture by the Ottomans.

Kara Mürsel Bey's tomb is located in the district of Karamürsel, along the D.100 Izmit-Bursa highway.

== His Testament ==
The testament of the Ottoman Empire's first Kapudan-ı Derya (Kapudan Pasha) was as follows:

When I die, bury me in a place where my back rests against the mountains and the sea lies in my lap, so that I may always behold the navy.

In accordance with his wishes, he rests in a tomb situated on a hillside overlooking the sea, located behind the shipyard he founded and within the marketplace of the district that bears his name.

== Gallery ==
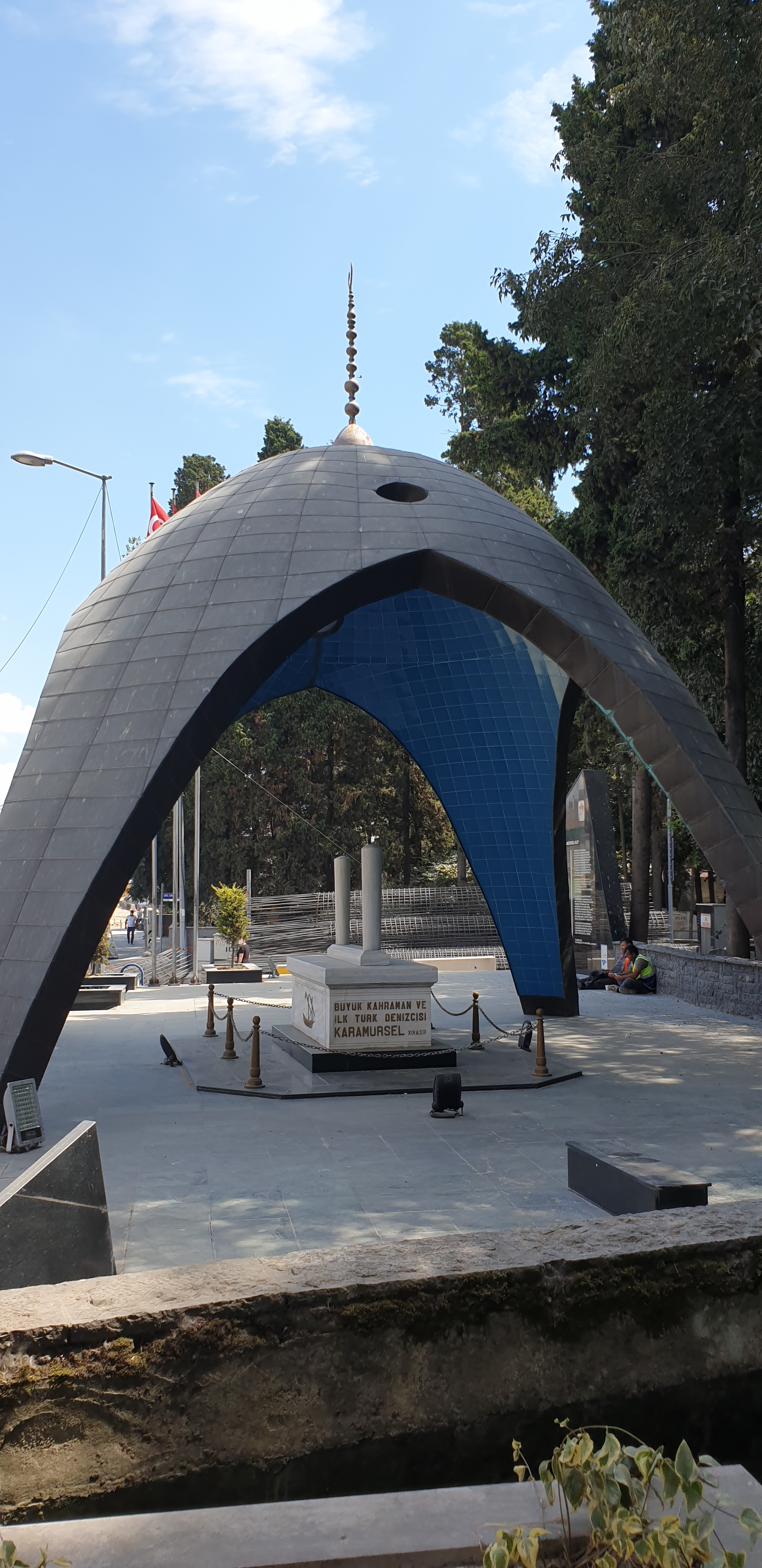
The monument and tomb of Kara Mürsel Bey in Karamürsel

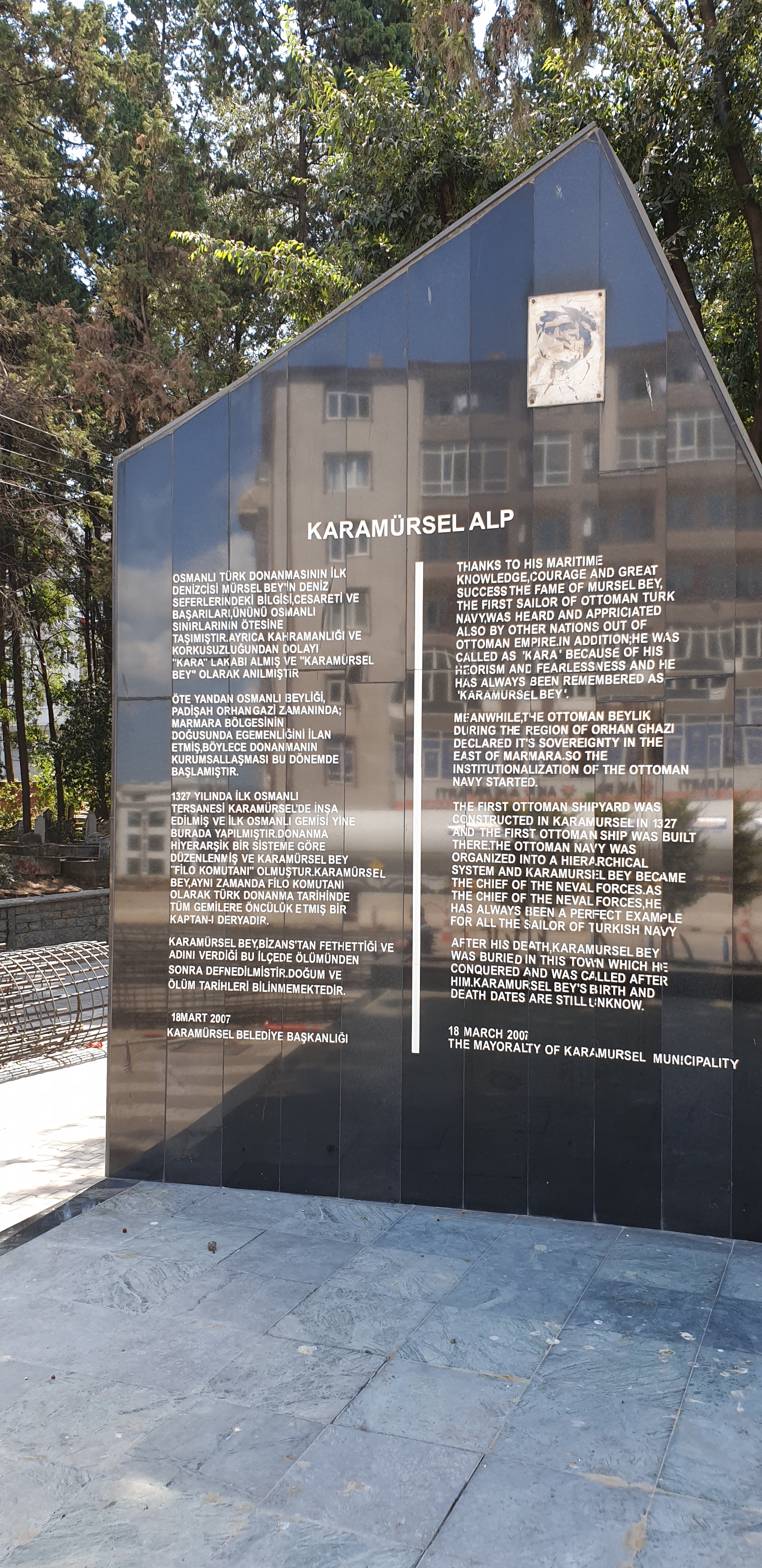
The Inscription on the Monument

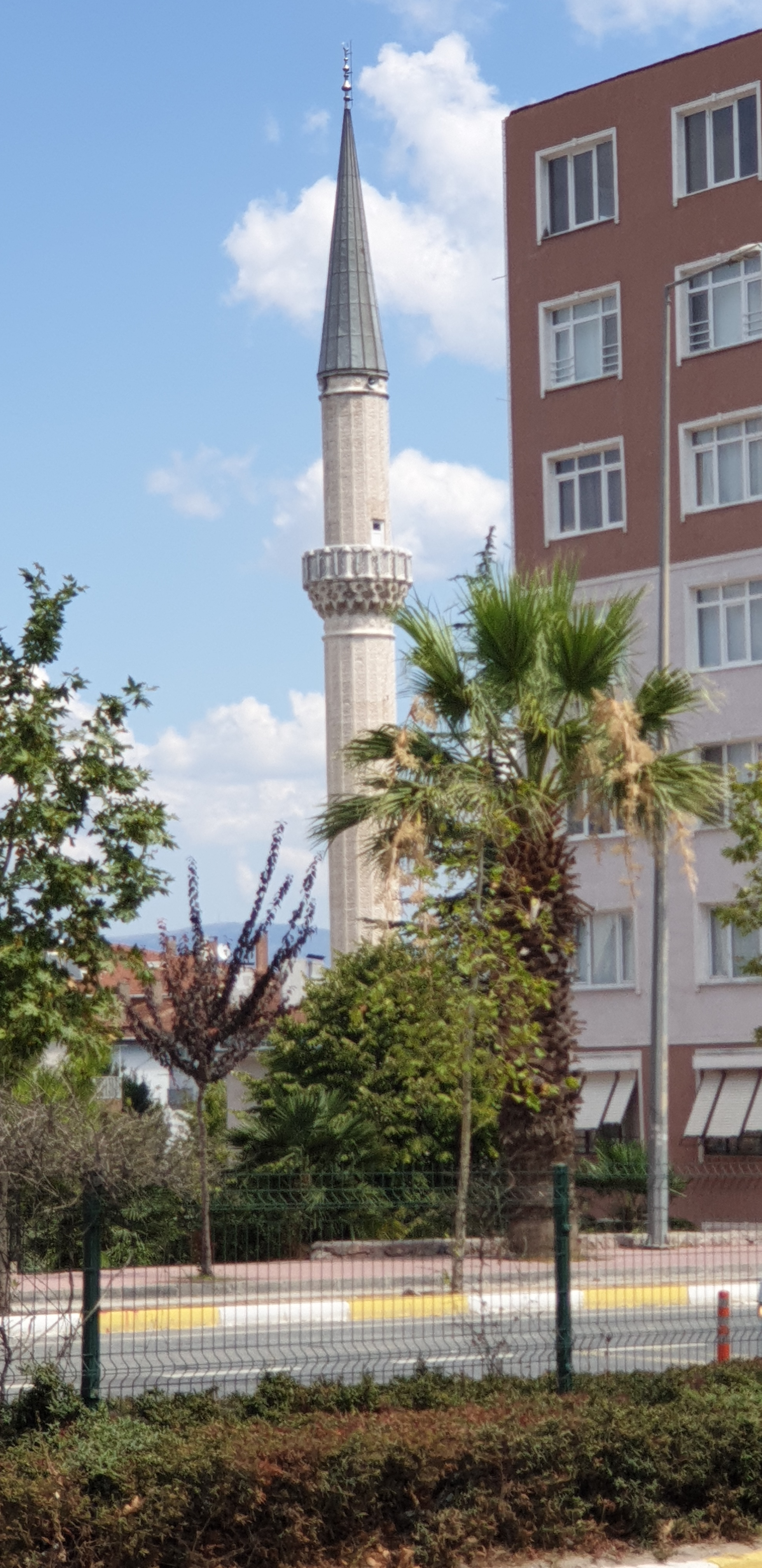
Kara Mürsel Bey's Mosque in Karamürsel

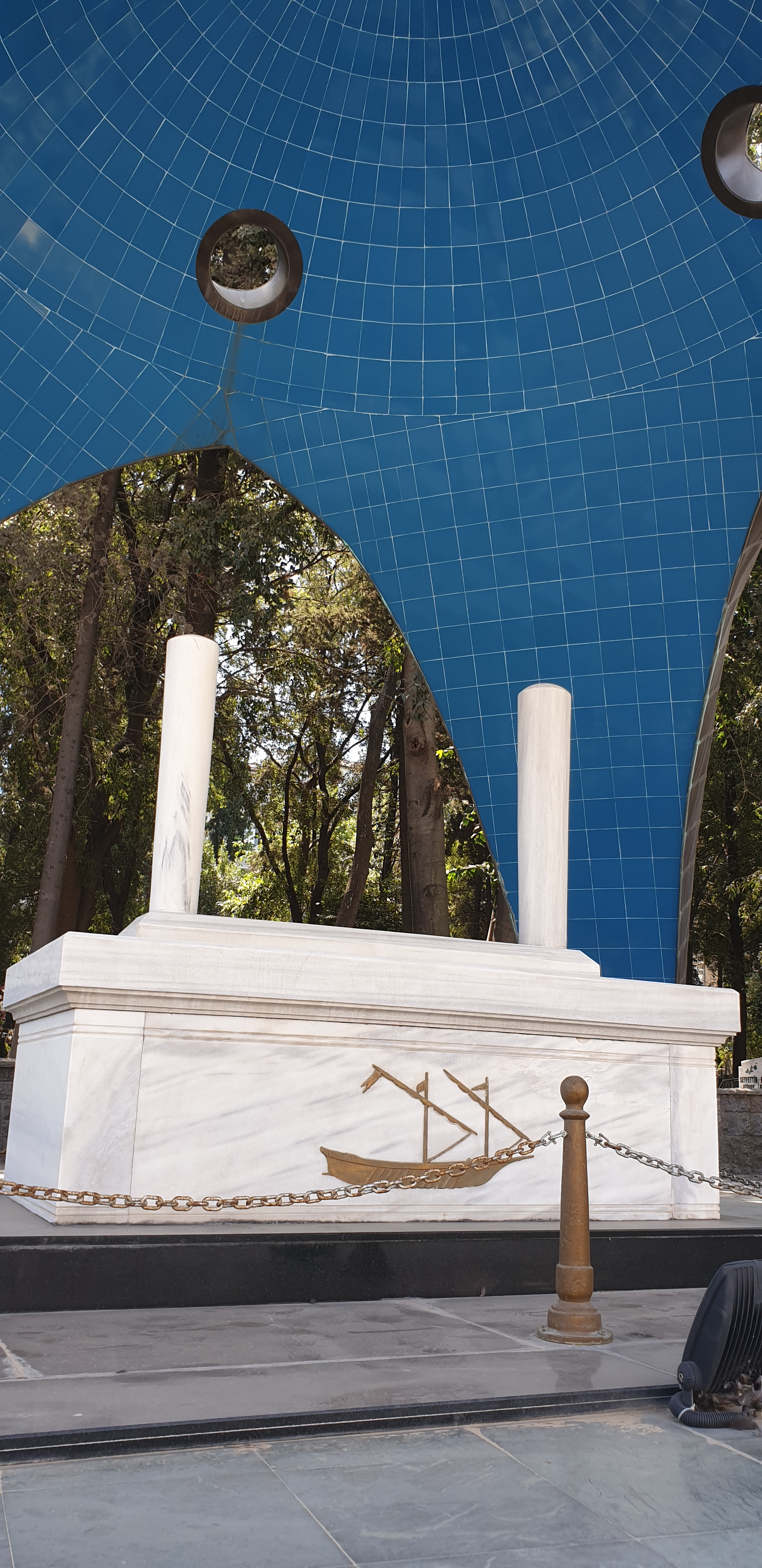
Kara Mürsel Bey's grave
