= Ottoman Bosnian Muslim noble families =

During the Ottoman rule in Bosnia and Herzegovina, several notable Bosnian Muslim families emerged. These families are commonly grouped into "bey families" (begovske porodice) or "captain families" (kapetanske porodice). The majority of the families originate from Islamicised Catholic or Eastern Orthodox Christian Slavic-speaking population, with several families of Turkic, Arabic and Albanian origin. A large number of the notable Bosnian Muslim families arrived in Bosnia and Herzegovina from neighbouring Croatian and Hungarian territories after the Great Turkish War at the end of the 17th or in early 18th century or from Montenegro and Serbia in the 18th century.

The "captain families" (kapetanske porodice) started their service as aghas and dizdars–army commanders in fortresses. They were, for the most part, descendants of Christian converts.

== List ==
Surname	Notes	Origin
Ajanović	The family is a notable family from Tešanj which arose from the class of ayans as semi-autonomous secular dignitaries.	They settled in Bosnia from Asia Minor at the end of the 16th or in early 17th century.
Alibegović	The noble family from Derventa.	They settled to Bosnia from Pest, Hungary in the late 17th century.
Alajbegović	The family was a notable family in Bihać. Members of their family held titles “bey” and were notable lawyers and judges who had studied around the world, from Vienna and Paris to Algeria. Mehmed Alajbegović was a judge and later a minister of foreign affairs, whilst his father and grandfather were both mayors of Bihać. They had ties to the House of Habsburg and were connected to the Biščević family through the wedding of their son to Aziza Bišćević.	They are the branch of the Ibrahimpašić family from Bosanska Krajina.
Agačević	The most notable family in Travnik (along with Begovac) at the turn of the 19th century.	
Avdić	The family is a notable family in Herzegovina. Their ancestor, Avdija Avdić, built the famous Avdić mosque (Avdića džamija) in Plana in 1617. Allegedly the Avdić family originated from the local Krivokapić family branch of the Kresojević clan. A prominent member was Avdo Krivokapić. The Akkanat family who settled in Karamürsel/Turkey after 1877-78 Russo-Turkish War originate from the Avdić family.https://women.volleybox.net/tr/hamiyet-samira-akkanat-p73542'	
Badanjković/Badnjević	They served as captains of Bosanska Krupa until the early 18th century. They were among the most notable families in the region at that time. The later Balević agha family originated from the Badanjković. Among the surnames of families that originated from the Krupa Badanjković are Badnjević, Pašalić, Topčagić, Dizdarević, Šabić, Avdagić.	Of Croat origin.
Bašagić	A notable bey family from Nevesinje.	They arrived to Nevesinje from Nikšić in Montenegro in the 18th century.
Bećirović	They served as governors of the Sanjak of Zvornik.	They settled in Tuzla surroundings since the 16th century.
Begovac	The most notable family (along with Agačević) of Travnik at the turn of the 19th century.	
Begzadić	The bey family from Zvornik.	The family tradition holds that their ancestors came to Bosnia from Aleppo in Syria in the 15th century.
Beširević	The bey family from Ostrožac, oldest of the captain families in Bosanska Krajina. Notable members include Osman-aga Beširević (fl. 1690–1727), Mehmed-beg Beširević and Džafer-beg Beširević, a commander of Krupa.	Either descending from an Anatolian progenitor according to the family tradition, or related to Stojan Janković.
Bičakčić	They bey family in Sarajevo.	
Bišćević	The family is from Bihać. They were the richest family in Bihać in the late Ottoman-Bosnian period. Mehmed-beg Biščević was the captain of Bihać since 1824 and held the honorific of pasha. During Austro-Hungarian rule, a member was an advisor to the Habsburg court. Their properties were confiscated by Socialist Yugoslavia after World War II.	Of Bosnian origin.
Boljanić	The most notable member was Hüseyin Pasha Boljanić (d. 1595).	The family originated in the village Boljanići (old name was Bolehnići) near Pljevlja in Montenegro
Bukovac		
Bušatlija	A notable bey family from Livno.	They settled in Livno from Bushat in Albania in the late 17th century.
Cerić	The notable bey family in Bosanski Novi.	The family settled in Bosanski Novi from Slavonia in Croatia in the late 17th century.
Čengić	They produced several beys. First mentioned by Evliya Çelebi in 1664/65. The family's most notable member was Smail-aga Čengić (1780–1840).	Turkic distant origin from Asia Minor. They settled in Bosnia in the 16th century.
Ćerić		
Ćerimović		
Čurčić	They were from Sarajevo.	
Džambegović		Two brothers came from Anatolia to Bosnia and split off, one went to Bosanska Krajina and the other to Podrinje.
Džinić	The bey family from Gradiška.	
Đonlagić	The bey family from Tešanj and Derventa.	The family arrived to Bosnia from Buda, Hungary in the late 17th century.
Đumišić	They were from Banja Luka.	
Fadilpašić	The bey family from Sarajevo. They became major landowners at the end of the 18th or in early 19th century.	They settled in Sarajevo from Feodosia in Crimea in the 18th century.
Fidahić	They were from Captains of Zvornik.	
Filipović	The bey family from Glamoč.	The family originates from canon Franjo Filipović from Zagreb, who was captured and converted to Islam in 1570.
Firdus	The bey family from Livno.	Of medieval Bosnian noble origin.
Gazibegović	The bey family from Gornja Orahovica.	
Glođa	The bey family from Sarajevo.	
Gradaščević	The captain family from Gradačac, The progenitor was Captain Osman Gradaščević (d. 1812).	They arrived to Bosnia from Buda, Hungary in the late 17th century.
Habul	They bey family from Bileća. The family moved primarily to the surroundings of Tuzla and Derventa before 1943.	
Hadžalić	The capitain family from Ljubuški between 1705 and 1814.	
Hadžiagić		
Hafizadić	The bey family from Travnik.	According to the family tradition, the family came to Bosnia from Aleppo, Syria, and settled in Jajce, and then to Travnik.
Hasanpašić	The bey family from Travnik. Named after Hasan Pasha, who died in 1817/1818.	
Hercegović		Descendants of the Kosača family from medieval Herzegovina.
Hrasnica	The bey family from Sarajevo.	The family originates from Sulejman Pasha, the mutasarrif in Zvornik in the 17th century. Their earlier surname was Ostojić, and they originate from Ostojići near Sarajevo. Sulejman Pasha married a noble woman from Hrasnica and settled there.
Huseinčehajić/Huseinćehajić	The bey family from Derventa.	
Ibrahimbegović	The bey family from Banja Luka.	
Ibrahimbegović	The bey family from Gradačac.	
Ibrahimpašić	The bey family from Bosanska Krajina. They are named after Ibrahim Pasha, the son of deli Murat Bey. Ibrahim gained the title of pasha in the 16th century because of his contributions in the conquest of Slavonia and Lika.	The father of their progenitor was originally from Anatolia. They lived in Đakovo, Croatia until the late 17th century, and moved to Donji Lapac, Croatia, where they lived until the late 18th century, when they moved to Ripač in Bosnia.
Ibrahimpašić	The bey family from Travnik.	Their progenitor is Ibrahim Pasha Kukavica, the wali of Bosnia in the mid-18th century. He was born in Kukavica in Foča. The family possibly originated in Kupres.
Idrizbegović	The bey family from Kupres.	Their progenitor is Idriz Bey. They arrived in Kupres in the second half of the 18th century. It is possible that they are a branch of the Sulejmanpašić family, but their origin cannot be determined historically.
Imaretlija	The bey family from Sarajevo.	
Isabegović	Active in the 15th century.	
Jahjapašić		
Kadić	The bey family from Foča.	
Kadić	The bey family from Golubić near Bihać.	The progenitor was Jašar, who was the son of Crni ("Black") Muhamed-aga of Anadol (Anatolia), who in turn was the son or grandson of Deli Murat-beg of Anadol.
Kapetanović	The bey family from Derventa.	Their progenitor was the last captain of Derventa Mahmud Bey Begović, who died in 1864/1865.
Kapetanović	The bey family from Jajce. At one point, they were captains in Jajce. Mustay Bey (died 1875) was the last captain of Jajce and the last surviving Bosnian captain.	
Kapetanović	The captain family from Prijedor. Their original surname was Pašić, while the Kapetanović surname was due to their service as captains in Prijedor from the mid-18th century until the abolition of the captain system in 1835.	The family originates from Udbina in Lika, present-day Croatia, from where their progenitor Pašo settled in Prijedor in the 18th century.
Kapetanović	The captain family from Tešanj.	
Kapetanović	The captain family from Vitina near Ljubuški.	Their oldest known descendant is Abdulah Agha Kapetanović (1588 – 1630). The older history of their origin stated that they are from an ethnic Croat family, Cvitković-Zdilar from Glavina near Imotski. Their progenitor was Jozo Cvitković-Zdilar, an Austrian officer who participated in a mutiny, escaped to Herzegovina, converted to Islam, adopted the name Sulejman and usurped the captancy in the late 18th century.
Karabegović	They bey family in Bihać, Modriča, Mostar and Zenica. A branch in Banja Luka also existed. Prominent members include S. Avdo Karabegović and Avdo Karabegović Hasanbegov.	The furthest origin of the family is in Konya in present-day Turkey. During the Ottoman conquest of Hungary, the family settled in Buda, present-day Hungary, from which four brothers moved to Bosnia at the beginning of the 18th century, each settling in Bihać, Modriča, Mostar and Zenica.
Kasumagić	They bey family from Sarajevo. The most notable member was Kasim Agha. The Kasumagić family produced several high-ranking officials in Sarajevo.	
Kopčić	They held possessions in the region of Rama, Duvno and Uskoplje.The oldest known member of the Kopčić family is Kasim Bey, who owned a ziamet, a form of land tenure, in the nahiyah of Osat, Borač and Vratar, all located in the kaza of Višegrad.	
Krupić	The captain family from Bosanska Krupa since the early 18th century. They succeeded the Badnjević families as captains after the Badnjevićs lost the sultan's favour for unknown reasons.	They are of ethnic Albanian origin. Their earlier surname was Arnautović.
Kulenović	The family had several branches: Šenigdžić, Čovka, Alikapetanović, Bajbutović, Bukovača, Hadžikadibegović, Haračlija, Suhaja, Sulejmanbegović, Vođenica. They had several notable members, including Skender Kulenović (Alikapetanović branch), Džafer Kulenović, Osman Kulenović and Nahid Kulenović (Bajbutović branch).	They settled in Bosnia from the area near Udbina in Lika, present-day Croatia, in the 17th century.
Kulović	The bey family from Sarajevo. Originally served as janissaries.	
Lafić	They bey family from Sarajevo.	
Lakišić	The bey family from Mostar. They served as dizdar (fortress commander) of Mostar. According to one version, they hail from Konya. The family claim that their relatives still live in Konya.	
Ljubović	The bey family from Nevesinje.	Their original surname was Zaimović, but they changed to Ljubović after a wife of the family's patriarch ("ljuba" meaning "love"). The patriarch, who was a participant in the Cretan War (1645–1669), is either Ahmed Bey or Osman Bey, the son of Omer Celebi from Herceg Novi in present-day Montenegro.
Miralem	The bey family from Donji Vakuf.	The family originates from Yemen. They arrived in Bosnia at some point after the Ottoman conquest, and settled in Jemanlići, a village near Donji Vakuf.
Mulabegović	The bey family from Derventa.	
Muslibegović	The bey family from Nevesinje.	The progenitor of the family is Musli Bey, the brother of Redžep Pasha of the Bašagić family. They arrived to Nevesinje from Nikšić in Montenegro in the 18th century.
Mušović		
Opijač		They were a branch of the Miloradović-Stjepanović noble family. They remained in Žitomislić after the Ottoman conquest and converted to Islam, taking Opijač as their collective surname. Today their descendants live in Dubrave near Stolac.
Osmanbegović		
Pašić	The bey family from Bijeljina.	Their original surname was Fidahić, and they are named after their progenitor, Ali Pasha Fidahić, who served as captain of Zvornik at the beginning of the 19th century. After participating in the Bosnian uprising (1831–1833), he fled to Slavonia in present-day Croatia and then to Istanbul, from where he settled in Bijeljina.
Pašić	The bey family from Nevesinje.	The progenitor of the family is Mustafa Pasha, the grandson of Redžep Pasha of the Bašagić family. They arrived in Nevesinje from Nikšić in Montenegro in the 18th century.
Pozderac	They are an influential family from Cazin, who rose to prominence in Bosanska Krajina, around the town of Cazin. They have been called the "Bosniak Kennedy's".	
Resulbegović	The captain family from Trebinje.	They came to Herzegovina from Herceg Novi in present-day Montenegro at the end of the 17th century.
Rizvanbegović	The family gained prominence in the mid-18th century. The most prominent member is Ali Pasha Rizvanbegović who ruled Herzegovina in the mid-19th century.	Their progenitor is Ivan Crnojević, a Serb ruler of Zeta in present-day Montenegro.
Salihbegović	The bey family from Bijeljina. The most prominent member is Avdo Bey Salihbegović, the last mayor of Biljeljina in the Ottoman Empire and the first mayor in Austria-Hungary.	The family originates from Aleppo in present-day Syria, from where they settled in Sremska Mitrovica in present-day Serbia as a noble family. They arrived in Bijeljina at the beginning of the 18th century.
Selimović		Allegedly used to bear the surname Vujović hailing from Vranjska near Bileća.
Sijerčić		According to early 20th century Serbian sources they were Serb origin
Sokolović	They produced several high-ranked officials. The family's most notable member was Sokollu Mehmed Pasha, Grand Vizier (s. 1565–79).	They originated from Serbian Orthodox Christians.
Sulejmanpašić	The bey family from Vesela, Bugojno. Notable members include the family's progenitor Sulejman Pasha Imširpašić and his son Osman Pasha Sulejmanpašić.	Thy're named after their progenitor Sulejman Pasha Imširpašić, who served as vizier of the Eyalet of Bosnia from 1815 to 1818. His great-great-grandfather was Ali Pasha. The family tradition holds that they belong to the family of Qara Yuluk Uthman Beg, whose branch came to Bosnia in the 16th century.
Svrzo	They bey family from Sarajevo.	
Šahinpašić		
Šerifović	The bey family from Sarajevo.	
Šetka	The bey family from Stolac.	
Skorbović		
Šurković		
Tanković		
Teskeredžić	The bey family from Gornji Vakuf and Bugojno.	Their original surname was Vilić and they are not related to Teskeredžićs from Travnik.
Teskeredžić	The bey family from Travnik.	They are originally from Roško Polje near present-day Tomislavgrad and are a branch of the Kapetanović family from Ljubuški. They are not related to Teskeredžićs from Gornji Vakuf and Bugojno.
Tuzlić	The captain family from Tuzla.	Their original surname was Osmanpašić. Their progenitor is Topal Osman Pasha. The tradition holds that they descend from Cvjetko, a Serb nobleman and brother of Nikola Altomanović.
Vidajić	The captain from Zvornik. Notable members were Ali Pasha Vidajić (d. 1810) and Mehmed Pasha Vidajić (d. 1806).	
Voljevica	Ali Agha Voljevica was ayan of Blagaj.	
Zulfikarpašić	The bey family from Foča.	They are a branch of the Čengić family.
Zlatanović		

== Sources ==
- Antonić, Zdravko (1995). Srpski pisci i naučnici o Bosni i Hercegovini. Službeni list SRJ. ISBN 978-86-355-0251-9.
- Dedijer, Jevto (1991). Hercegovina: antropogeografske studije. Veselin Masleša. ISBN 9788621004508.
- Prof. Dr. Feridun Emecen, TDV İslâm Ansiklopedisi, Turkish academic encyclopedia for Islamic studies, p. 524,525
- Filipović, Milenko (1951). Цинцари у Босни, Зборник радова [Aromanians in Bosnia: a collection of papers] (in Serbian). Belgrade: Etnografski institut.
- Hadžijahić, Muhamed (1966). "Turska komponenta u etnogenezi Bosanskih muslimana". Pregled: časopis zu društvena pitanja. 18 (11–12): 485–502.
- Kamberović, Husnija (2003). Begovski zemljišni posjedi u Bosni i Hercegovini od 1878. do 1918. godine. Hrvatski institut za povijest. ISBN 9789536324361.
- Kamberović, Husnija (2005). Begovski zemljišni posjedi u Bosni i Hercegovini od 1878. do 1918. godine (2nd ed.). Sarajevo: Ibn Sina. ISBN 9958-9571-8-3. OCLC 181328388.
- Kreševljaković, Hamdija (1959). Čengići: prilog proučavanju feudalizma u Bosni i Hercegovini [The Čengićs: a contribution to the study of feudalism in Bosnia and Herzegovina] (in Serbo-Croatian). Sarajevo: Sarajevski grafički zavod.
- Kreševljaković, Hamdija (1980). Kapetanije u Bosni i Hercegovini. Svjetlost.
- Lovrenović, Dubravko (2013). Stećci: Bosansko i humsko mramorje srednjeg vijeka [Stećci: Bosnian and Hum marbles from Middle Age] (in Serbo-Croatian). Ljevak. ISBN 9789533035468.
- Stojančević, Vladimir (1971). Južnoslovenski narodi u Osmanskom Carstvu od Jedrenskog mira 1829. do Pariskog kongresa 1856. godine. Izdavačko-štamparsko preduzeće PTT.
- Hazim Šabanović, Putopis : Odlomci o jugoslavenskim zemljama, 1967, Isabegzade p. 108, 109, 111, 263–264, 265, 282–283, 284, 286, 291
- Evlya Čelebi Seyahatname
- Dr. Ćiro Truhelka, Tursko-slovjenski spomenici dubrovačke arhive, Glasnik Zemaljskog muzeja BiH XXIII. 1911. Sarajevo p. 437-484
- Amir Isajbegović, Kuća onih što sade dud - rekonstrukcija, Zagreb 2022. ISBN 978-953-49425-0-5
