= Zulfikarpašić–Karadžić agreement =

1991 negotiations in Yugoslavia

Muslim-Serbian agreement
- Type: Political
- Context: Breakup of Yugoslavia
- Drafted: June 1991
- Negotiators: (Socialist Republic of Bosnia and Herzegovina) Adil Zulfikarpašić; (Socialist Republic of Bosnia and Herzegovina) Muhamed Filipović; Radovan Karadžić; Nikola Koljević; Momčilo Krajišnik
- Parties: (Socialist Republic of Bosnia and Herzegovina) Bosnian Muslims (Party of Democratic Action, SDA); Bosnian Serbs (Serb Democratic Party, SDS)

In June 1991, representatives of Bosnian Muslims (Party of Democratic Action, SDA) and Bosnian Serbs (Serb Democratic Party, SDS) met to discuss the future status of SR Bosnia and Herzegovina during the Yugoslav crisis.

On behalf of SDA president Alija Izetbegović, Adil Zulfikarpašić and Muhamed Filipović met with SDS president Radovan Karadžić, Nikola Koljević and Momčilo Krajišnik. The two sides reached an agreement that Bosnia and Herzegovina was to remain sovereign and undivided, remaining in a Yugoslav confederation with Serbia and Montenegro. The Muslim Bosniak-inhabited area of Sandžak in SR Serbia was to become autonomous, while SAO Krajina and SAO Bosanska Krajina were to abandon their unification plan. Zulfikarpašić received the consent of Serbian President Slobodan Milošević, who also promised 60% of Sandžak to Bosnia and Herzegovina. Izetbegović, who initially supported it, later abandoned the agreement.

The inability to find a solution diplomatically eventually led to the outbreak of the Bosnian War some 10 months later. Following the signing of the Dayton Agreement which ended the war, Bosnia and Herzegovina became an internationally recognized independent federation with several entities.

== Annotations ==
1. Also known as "Serb-Muslim agreement", "Muslim-Serb agreement", "Muslim-Serbian agreement", etc.

== See also ==
- Partition of Bosnia and Herzegovina
- Peace plans proposed before and during the Bosnian War
- 1991 Sandžak autonomy referendum

== Sources ==
- Jasminka Udovicki; James Ridgeway (31 October 2000). Burn This House: The Making and Unmaking of Yugoslavia. Duke University Press. pp. 204–. ISBN 0-8223-2590-X.
- Charles W. Ingrao; Thomas Allan Emmert (15 September 2012). Confronting the Yugoslav Controversies: A Scholars' Initiative. Purdue University Press. pp. 91–. ISBN 978-1-55753-617-4.
- Ramet, Sabrina P. (1 January 2002). Balkan Babel: The Disintegration of Yugoslavia from the Death of Tito to the Fall of Milošević. Westview Press. p. 205. ISBN 978-0-8133-3987-0.
- Robert J. Donia (29 September 2014). Radovan Karadzic: Architect of the Bosnian Genocide. Cambridge University Press. pp. 80–. ISBN 978-1-107-07335-7.
