= Karapınar, Karamürsel =

Karapınar
- Neighbourhood
- Location within Turkey Location within Marmara
- Coordinates: 40.666°N 29.609°E
- Country: Turkey
- Province: Kocaeli
- District: Karamürsel
- Population (2022): 581
- Time zone: UTC+3 (TRT)

Karapınar is a neighbourhood of the municipality and district of Karamürsel, Kocaeli Province, Turkey. Its population is 581 (2022). It is 37 km west of İzmit city center and 5 km south of Karamürsel.

== Population ==
Historical population
| Year | Pop. | ±% p.a. |
|---|---|---|
| 1997 | 500 | — |
| 2007 | 646 | +2.60% |
| 2012 | 670 | +0.73% |
| 2017 | 608 | −1.92% |
| 2022 | 581 | −0.90% |
Source: 1997 census and TÜIK (2007-2022)
