= 1991 Sandžak autonomy referendum =

The 1991 Sandžak autonomy referendum was held in Sandžak, Serbia, between 25 and 27 October 1991. Voters were asked whether they supported autonomy.

The Serbian government declared the referendum unconstitutional.

== Results ==
Choice	Votes	%
For	183,302	98.90
Against	4,171	1.10
Total	187,473	100
Registered voters/turnout	264,156	70.19
Source: Bosniak National Council

== See also ==
- Zulfikarpašić–Karadžić agreement
