= Zati Sungur =

Hasan Zati Sungur
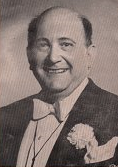
- Born: March 10, 1898; Bursa, Turkey
- Died: July 6, 1984 (aged 86); Istanbul, Turkey
- Resting place: Zincirlikuyu Cemetery, Istanbul, Turkey
- Occupation: performer of stage magic
- Spouse: Necla Sungur
- Children: Aynur Sungur Tuncer, Saynur Oktem
- Website: www.zatisungur.org

Hasan Zati Sungur (March 10, 1898 – July 6, 1984) was an internationally recognized Turkish stage magician.

== Early years ==
Hasan Zati Sungur was born in Bursa on March 10, 1898. He got interested in stage magic during his primary school years. He learned magic tricks, which he used to amaze his classmates. After graduating from the primary school, he won the entry exam to the Navy Petty-Officers School of Mechanics in Istanbul with highest score. He continued to exhibit his magic tricks also there.

During World War I, he was sent to Germany for training in submarines. When the relations between Germany and Turkey broke after the war, he stayed in Germany. First he found a job in an orthopedy workshop, and later began working in the Maschinenbauanstalt Humboldt in Cologne. During this time, he read publications on magic tricks and visited magic shows.

== Career ==
Some time after, Zati Sungur devoted himself to stage magic. His professional magic shows at the Berlin Wintergarten theatre brought him great success. With a group of artists, he went on tour in France, Italy, Spain, North America, and then in 1922 in South America. He toured in Chile, Paraguay, Brezilya and Argentina with his own team of 10-12 magician's assistants and two trucks full of material. He gained great fame previously with the stage name "Count Sati von Richmond" and later with "Zati Bey".

In 1924, he started to develop the magic trick of the thin model sawing, accomplishing its final version in 1930. This trick would be a contribution to the stage magic world.

Zati Sungur returned home on April 21, 1936, and began to perform his shows on May 9 in the Ses Theatre (aka French Theatre) in Istanbul. His fame spread quickly. After a show attended by President Mustafa Kemal Atatürk. he was praised and congratulated by Atatürk and was honored decades long with governments' memos to all governors that Zati Sungur like shows touring Turkey should be supported by all means including a possible city tax reduction by the mayors. He toured across Turkey and in countries of Eastern Europe and the Middle East.

He received the "Grand Prize" at the 1975 Magic convention in Karlovy Vary, then in Czechoslovakia, with his trick "Magic Dice". In 1981, he was honored with the title "King of the Magicians" at the convention in the same city.

Zati Sungur featured in a 1940 movie Nasreddin Hoca dügünde. In June 1958, he appeared on the cover of the American magician magazine Genii's 10th edition.

He retired from active stage life in 1966, and established "Universal Sihirbazlık ve İllüzyon Hünerleri Stüdyosu" (Universal Stage Magic and Illusion Skills Studio), where he exhibited the magic trick instruments he had invented. His studio became the biggest production and distribution center in Eastern Europe and the Middle East. He wrote and published two books about magic tricks and instruments.

He was the mentor of Sermet Erkin, a famous Turkish magician today.

== Street magic ==
Zati Sungur performed street magic to attract people for his stage magic shows.

In 1958, he was in the southwestern town of Milas, Muğla. One morning, he went to a bank and deposited 100,000 Turkish lira in banknotes, which at that time was a huge sum. In the afternoon, he came back to the bank and requested to withdraw his money. After opening the bank safe, the manager and his deputy astonishingly realized that no banknotes were in, but torn newspaper. Zati Sungur laughed and returned his bankbook. He invited them to his evening show in the town. The show took place in an open-air movie theater and was sold out. Towards the end of the show, it started to rain with thunder. Zati Sungur gave an umbrella to each one leaving, who put it up and went out. As soon as outside the movie theatre, the visitors realized that there was no rain or thunder, and they held a long leek in the hand instead of an umbrella.

One day in Muğla, he went to the city's best-known ice cream stand. After inspecting the glasses on the counter, he claimed the glasses were not clean enough. He backhandedly threw them onto the ground, which broke. The owner of the ice cream stand got angry and tried to attack Zati Sungur. He paid the tradesman with banknotes for the damage. As the ice cream man looked satisfied, he restored the glasses on the counter as before with a flick. Then, he introduced himself, and invited the crowd to his show in the evening. Finally, he asked the ice cream man to throw away the money he gave him because they were worthless. The ice cream man realized that it was torn newspaper what he held in the hand.

== Family life and death ==
In 1938, he married his stage assistant Necla. They had two daughters together.

Zati Sungur died of cardiac insufficiency at the age of 86 in Istanbul on July 6, 1984. He was laid to rest at the Zincirlikuyu Cemetery after the religious ceremony held in Teşvikiye Mosque on July 10.

== Works ==
- Zati Sungur (September 1968). Zati Sungur Öğretiyor - Salon Oyun ve Eğlenceleri. p. 96.
- Zati Sungur. Üstad Zati Sungur'un Sihirbazlık Ve İllüzyon Hünerleri Kataloğu (1965 ed.). p. 112.
- Zati Sungur. Üstad Zati Sungur'un Sihirbazlık Ve İllüzyon Hünerleri Kataloğu (1973 ed.). p. 320.
