= Bosnia and Herzegovina–Turkey relations =

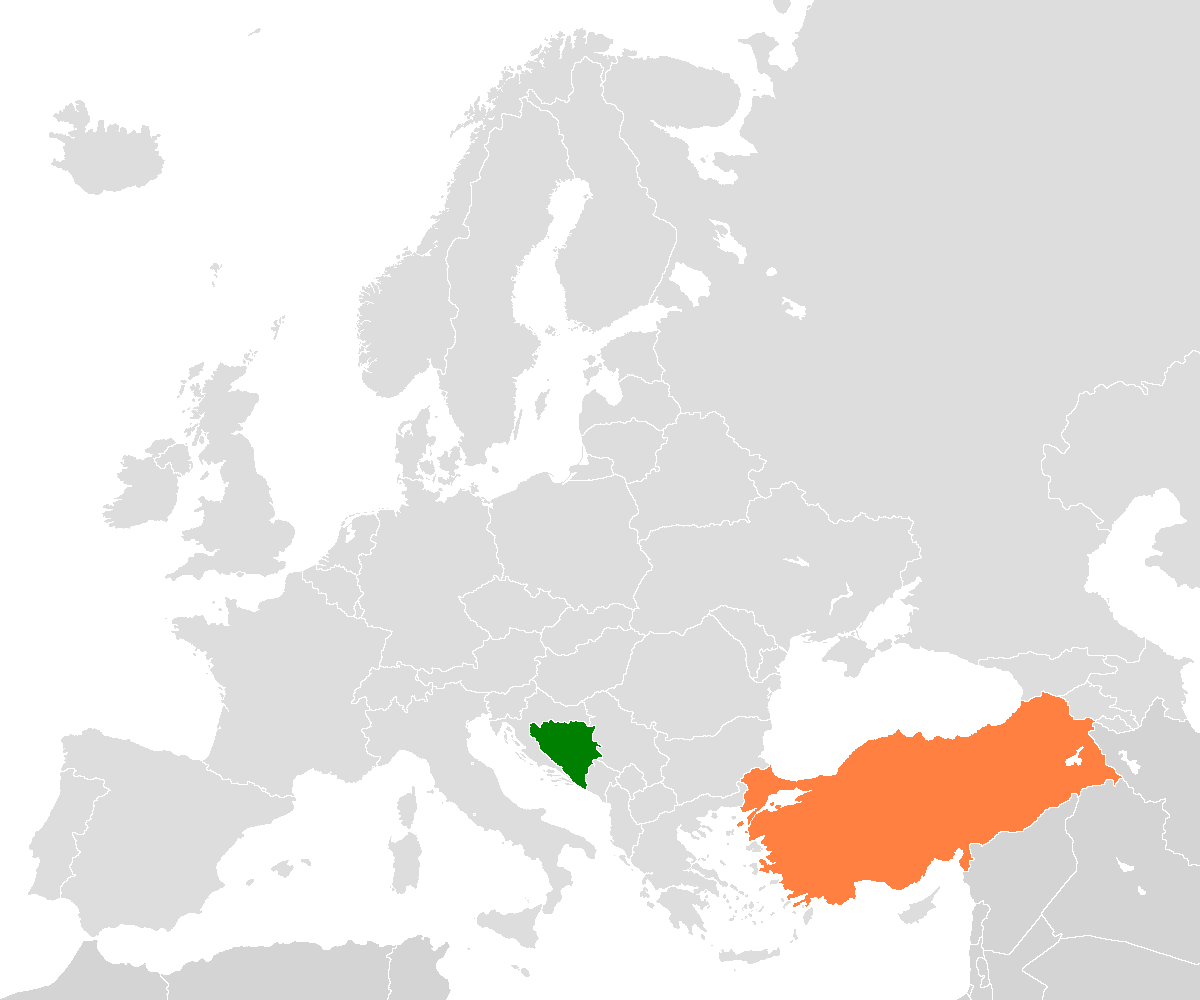

- Bosnia and Herzegovina: Turkey

Diplomatic mission
- Bosnian embassy, Ankara: Turkish embassy, Sarajevo

Bosnia and Herzegovina–Turkey relations are the bilateral relations between Bosnia-Herzegovina and Turkey. Bosnia and Herzegovina is a southeast European country, while Turkey is a transcontinental country with a small European part on the Balkan peninsula around Istanbul. Diplomatic relations between the two countries started on 29 August 1992. Bosnia and Herzegovina has one embassy in Ankara and two consulates in Istanbul and İzmir, while Turkey has one embassy in Sarajevo and one consulate in Mostar. The two countries enjoy very warm diplomatic relations, due to historical and cultural ties dating back to the 15th century. There is a large population of Bosniaks in Turkey and a smaller community of Turks in Bosnia and Herzegovina. The Istanbul quarter of Yenibosna ("New Bosnia") is named in honour of the Bosnian community that has settled there since Ottoman times. Reflecting the close ties between the two nations, Bosnians and Turks are free to travel to each other's countries using only their national identification cards, without the need for a passport. Turkey gives full support to Bosnia and Herzegovina's NATO membership.

== History ==
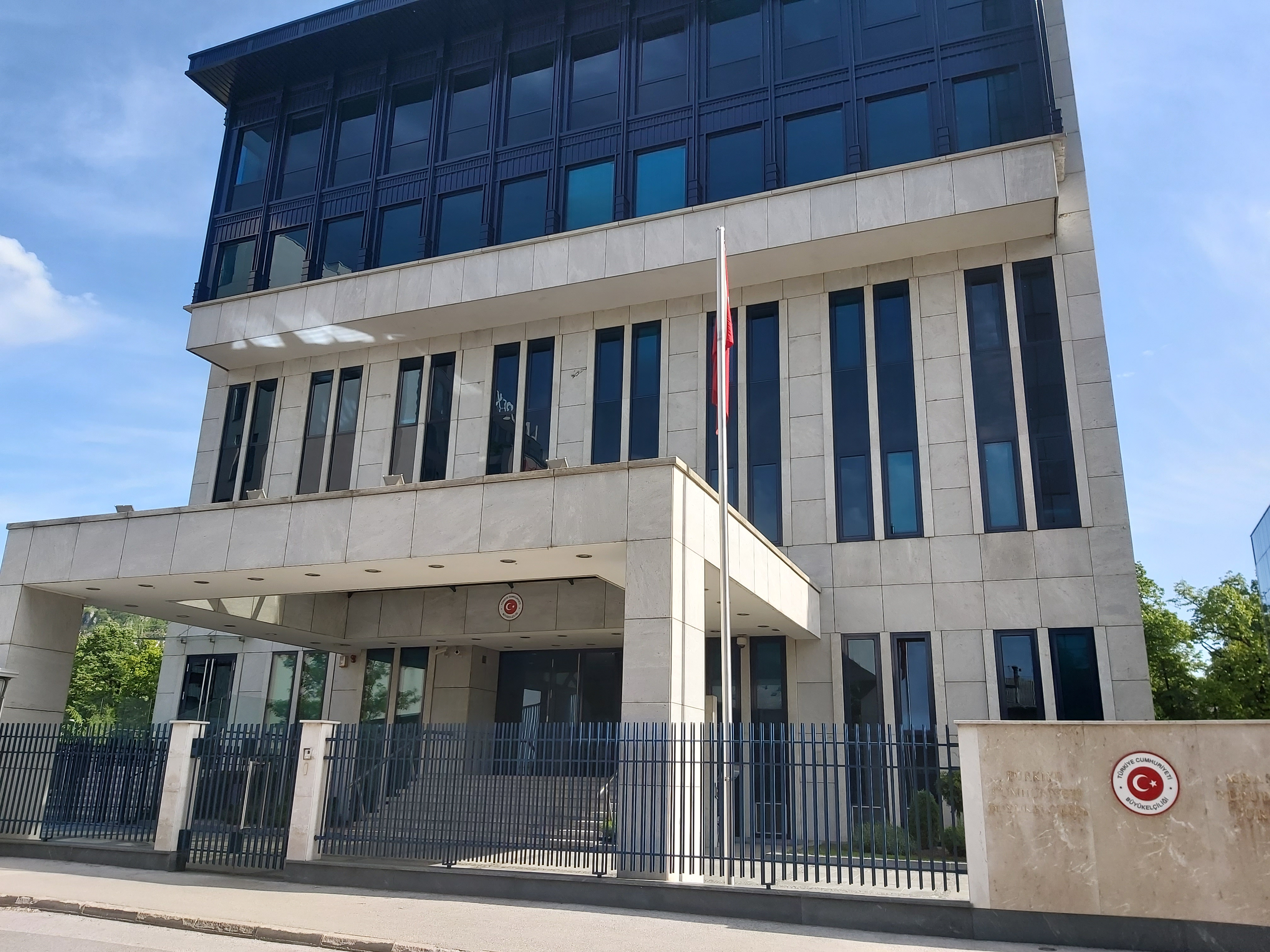
Embassy of Turkey in Sarajevo

Due to strong bonds between the Bosnian region and the Ottoman Empire since the Ottoman conquest of the Balkans historically, a significant Turkish community as well as ties linking Bosnia and Turkey were established when Bosnia fell under Ottoman rule.

Bosnia and Herzegovina was an important region for the Ottomans. Being its westernmost province, the Ottomans invested heavily in military infrastructure at the borderlands, and at the same time promoted cordial relations between settler Turks and the local populace. Many historical Ottoman figures, such as the Grand Vizier Sokollu Mehmed Pasha, came from Bosnia and Herzegovina.

Most Turks left Bosnia and Herzegovina after Austria-Hungary occupied this region in 1878, although it de jure remained Ottoman territory for another 30 years. It was officially annexed in 1908, bringing the 445-year Ottoman era to an end.

After Mustafa Kemal Atatürk established the newly Republic of Turkey from the ruins of the Ottoman Empire, many modern Turkish politicians sought closer relations between Bosnia and Herzegovina and Turkey both during Yugoslav rule and after, according to the motto of "two states, one heart."

=== Bosnian War ===
Turkey recognized Bosnia and Herzegovina as an independent state on 6 February 1992. It was one of the first countries to do so; Bosnia and Herzegovina did not formally declare independence until the following month. Both countries established diplomatic relations on 29 August 1992. Since the beginning of the Bosnian War, Turkey has supported the independence and territorial integrity of Bosnia, pursuing active diplomatic efforts in this direction. On 22 July 1995, Turkish president Süleyman Demirel mediated between Bosnia and Herzegovina and Croatia when both countries signed the Split Agreement which enabled joined defence of Bosnia and Herzegovina and Croatia against Serb forces.

== Post-war relations ==
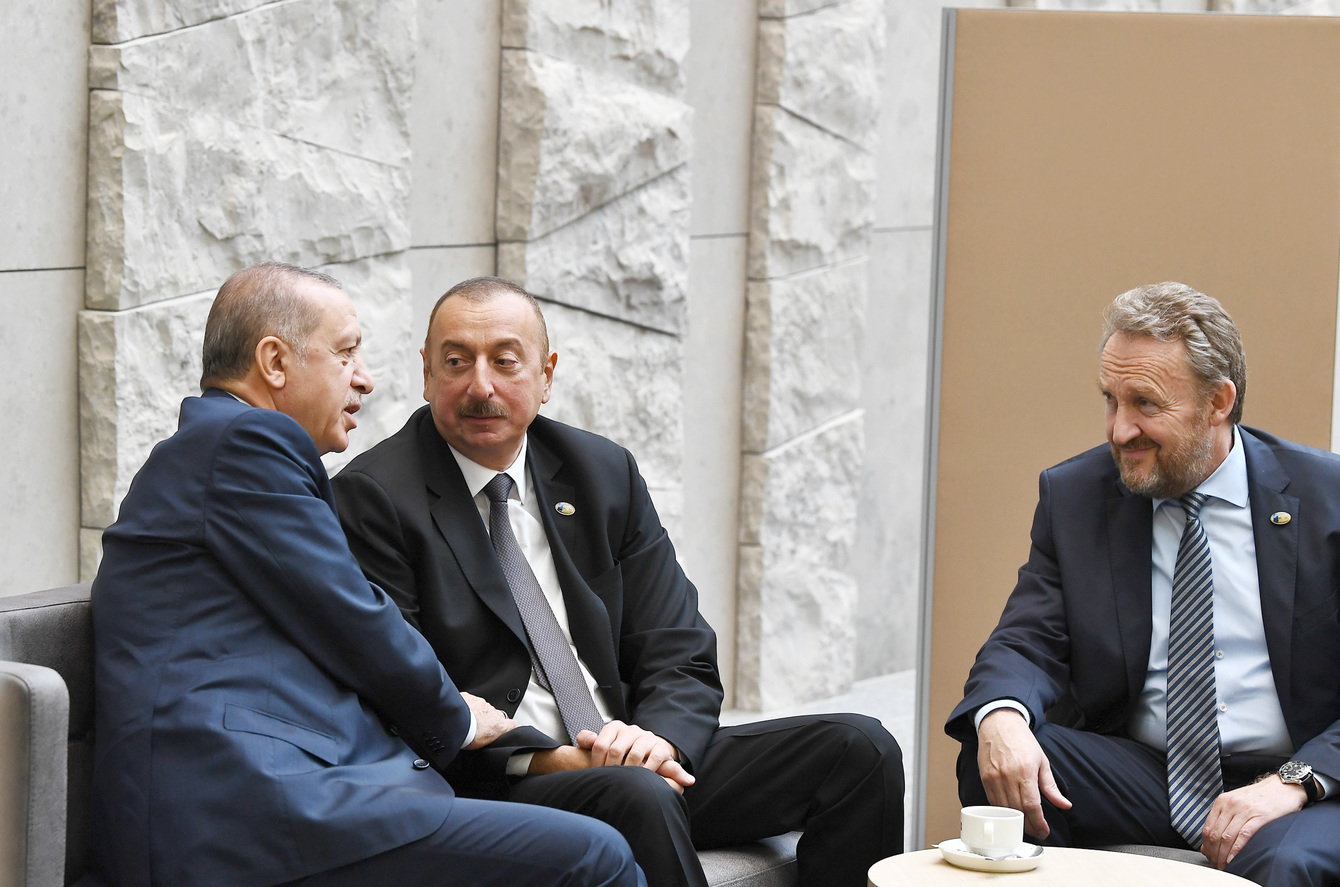
Bosnian Presidency Chairman Bakir Izetbegović (right) with Turkish President Recep Tayyip Erdoğan (left) and Azerbaijani President Ilham Aliyev, 12 July 2018

Mustafa Cerić, the president of the Islamic community of Bosnia and Herzegovina, stated: "Turkey is our mother, so it was, so it will remain." On 11 July 2012, while visiting commemoration of Srebrenica massacre in Srebrenica, Turkish prime minister, Recep Tayyip Erdoğan, stated that Alija Izetbegović told him while he visited him in hospital that he left him "Bosnia [and Herzegovina] as a testament" and that "Bosnia [and Herzegovina] is an inheritance of the Ottomans". In recent years Turkish influence amongst the Bosniak politicians is growing. Erdogan is known for his effort in conciliation of two major Bosniak political parties, the Party of Democratic Action and the Social Democratic Party of Bosnia and Herzegovina, the latter is de iure a multi-ethnic party.

Many Bosnian towns with a Bosniak majority have streets named after Ottoman statesmen and conquerors. In center of Sarajevo there is a street named after Sokollu Mehmed Pasha and in Bihać there is a street named after Suleiman the Magnificent.

In 2016, as part of a state project named "living languages and accents in Turkey" the Turkish government accepted the Bosnian language as a selective course for its schools and announced that classes would start in 2018, first being piloted in areas with people of Balkan origins such as the İzmir region.

In May 2018, Bosnian leader Bakir Izetbegović said, some days before the visit of the Turkish President in Bosnia, that Recep Tayyip Erdoğan is a mentor for the Muslims and this is the reason that West doesn't like him.

The Turkish government has also assisted in the reconstruction of historic mosques which were destroyed during the Bosnian War, such as the Aladža Mosque in Foča and the Arnaudija Mosque in Banja Luka.

=== Turkish lobbyist group UEBD ===
In February 2018, a new pro-Turkish lobby group with the acronym "UEBD" was founded. Its opening promotional video, titled Olive Branch from Bosnia, a reference to the ongoing Turkish offensive with Syrian Kurds, showed Bosnians from all walks of life voicing their admiration and support for Turkey's military operation, spoken in fluent Turkish, and supplemented with prayers for the success of Turkey's operation. The new lobby group has raised suspicions in Bosnia and in Western countries about Erdogan's intentions to "strengthen his influence" in the Balkans.

=== 2022 Erdogan visit to Bosnia and Herzegovina ===
During the visit of the Turkish President and his delegation to Bosnia and Herzegovina on the 6th of September 2022. The travel relationship between the 2 countries was eased. It was enabled for both Turkish and Bosnian citizens to travel to both countries using only an I.D Card.

Erdogan also mentioned during his speech that he did not support the forcement of a new election law by Christian Schmidt the High Representative in Bosnia and Herzegovina

Along with that, during that day talks were held surrounding the Turkish role in the future Sarajevo-Belgrade highway.

== See also ==
- Foreign relations of Bosnia and Herzegovina
- Foreign relations of Turkey
- Turks in Bosnia and Herzegovina
- Bosniaks in Turkey
- Turkey–Yugoslavia relations
