= Glavina =

Glavina is a Croatian surname that may refer to:

- Andrei Glavina (1881–1925), Istro-Romanian writer
- Denis Glavina (born 1986), Croatian footballer
- Dominik Glavina (born 1992), Croatian footballer
- Ratko Glavina (born 1941), Croatian actor

== See also ==
- Glavin
