= Adil Zulfikarpašić =

Bosnian intellectual and politician (1921–2008)

Vice President of the Republic of Bosnia and Herzegovina
- In office 20 December 1990 – 14 March 1996
- President: Alija Izetbegović
- Preceded by: Office established
- Succeeded by: Office abolished

Personal details
- Born: 23 December 1921 Foča, Kingdom of Serbs, Croats and Slovenes
- Died: 21 July 2008 (aged 86) Sarajevo, Bosnia and Herzegovina
- Party: Muslim Bosniak Organisation
- Spouse: Tatjana Nikšić
- Relations: Ante Nikšić (father-in-law), Bojan Zulfikarpašić (great-nephew), Zulfikar Paša Čengić (great-grandfather)
- Education: University of Graz; University of Innsbruck; University of Vienna
- Profession: Politician; Lawyer; Entrepreneur; Merchant
- Website: www.bosnjackiinstitut.ba

Adil Zulfikarpašić (23 December 1921 – 21 July 2008) was a Bosniak intellectual and politician who served as vice president of the Republic of Bosnia and Herzegovina, during the Bosnian War of the 1990s, under the first president of the Presidency of the Republic of Bosnia and Herzegovina Alija Izetbegović. After the war he retired from politics and opened the Bosniak Institute, a museum in Sarajevo focused on the Bosniak culture.

Although a proponent of the Croatian national idea in his early life, Zulfikarpašić later advocated the position that Bosnian Muslims should build their own national identity and advocated the adoption of the Bosniak name. At first there was resistance to this idea, including within the leading political party of Bosnian Muslims—the Party of Democratic Action—but it prevailed in 1993 when the new name was adopted at the Bosniak Congress attended by Bosnian Muslim political and cultural representatives.

== Early life ==
=== Family ===
Zulfikarpašić was born on 23 December 1921 in Foča, a town along the Drina river in the Kingdom of Serbs, Croats, and Slovenes (now Bosnia and Herzegovina). He was a member of the Čengić family through both parents.

His father Husein-beg Čengić-Zulfikarpašić was a landowner and an intellectual, son of Ali-beg Čengić and a grandson of Zulfikar Pasha Čengić, after whom his paternal family was surnamed Zulfikarpašić. Zulfikarpašić wrote that he used the dual surname throughout his elementary school, but that his family dropped the "Čengić" from their surname while he was still in his youth. Husein served as the mayor of Foča for 25 years after the Austrian-Hungarian occupation of Bosnia and Herzegovina in 1878. Adil was born when his mother was 18 years old and his father Husein-Beg was 87 years old. Husein died at 102 when Adil was 15 years old. Husein never had several wives at the same time, and his previous three wives died. Zahida was his fourth wife and originated from the Ratalj branch of the Čengić family. The two of them had another son Sabrija and six daughters. The oldest half-brother of Adil was Alija who was 55 years older than him. Husein died in 1936 aged 102 or 104 years when Adil was 15 years old, while Zahida died in 1956.

Adil's half-brothers were Alija and Hilmo, both of whom moved to the Ottoman Empire after Austria-Hungary occupied Bosnia and Herzegovina. Ibrahim, Hasan, Hivzo, Hamdija, while Sabrija was his full brother. His half-sisters were Arifa, Fatima and Haša, and full sisters Zumreta, Hasiba, Hajrija, Hamijera, Fahra and Šefika.

=== Education and World War II ===
In his youth, Zulfikarpašić felt close to the Croatian national idea, rather than Serbian. He was also active in the Croatian Peasant Party. While attending gymnasium in Foča he became a leftist and joined a certain group of the League of Communist Youth of Yugoslavia (SKOJ). Eventually, he was expelled for disseminating communist literature, and had to continue his education in Rogatica. Just before his graduation, he was expelled again with other ten colleagues without the right to take the graduation exam. However, a local politician helped to abolish these punishments, so Zulfikarpašić was able to continue his education at the Commercial Academy in Sarajevo. He was again expelled, and continued to educate in Osijek and Banja Luka, where he took private classes since his further education at commercial academies was forbidden. In 1938 he joined the Communist Party of Yugoslavia (KPJ), when he was 17 years old. In 1940 he enrolled at the High Commercial School in Belgrade because Belgrade had more active leftist politics than Zagreb.

After the outbreak of World War II in Yugoslavia in 1941, he joined the Yugoslav Partisans and became a member of the Zvijezda Brigade in Vareš. The following year, he was captured by the Ustaše (the Croatian pro-Nazi forces) in Sarajevo, tortured and sentenced to death. He escaped with the help of the Partisans, and in 1945, with the war ending in victory over the Axis powers, the Communists came into power and Zulfikarpašić was appointed Deputy Minister of Trade.

== Exile ==
After becoming disillusioned with Josip Broz Tito's government shortly after the end of the war, Zulfikarpašić fled into exile in Zurich, Switzerland.

While on his way to Switzerland, Zulfikarpašić stayed in Innsbruck, Austria. There he met Tatjana Nikšić, daughter of the NDH diplomat Ante Nikšić. The relationship between the two caused a stir among the Croat émigrés, especially the Franciscans. However, her father who was in Buenos Aires at the time, approved the relationship writing that Zulfikarpašić's head was "in the right place", though he preferred if Zulfikarpašić would convert to Catholicism. The couple subsequently relocated to Rome, where Zulfikarpašić associated with former Ustaše official Alija Šuljak.

Zulfikarpašić, a self-identified Croat, found allies in the exiled leaders of the Croatian Peasant Party (HSS), Juraj Krnjević especially, who was sympathetic towards Bosnian Muslims. Zulfikarpašić also befriended August Juretić, a Croat Catholic priest close to HSS, whom he succeeded jointly with Pavao Jesih as a co-editor of Hrvatski dom, the official magazine of HSS after Juretić died in 1954. However, he became more convinced that Bosnian Muslims need to develop their own political direction. Writing in January 1956 to Indiana sociologist Dinko Tomašić, Zulfikarpašić blamed the Ustaše for the interruption of the development of Bosnian Muslims towards Croatdom, stating that Tomašić's statement that "the rise of national consciousness among Muslims Bosnia and Herzegovina developed [...] exclusively in the direction of Croatdom" was correct, but added that "on the account of Ustaše transgressions during the war, there were instances of distancing from Croatdom even among those layers that had already started identifying themselves and becoming conscious in that direction" and that "the process of national awakening in the direction of Croatdom experienced heavy blows in the course of the war and was slowed."

In 1963, Zulfikarpašić founded the Liberal-Democratic Alliance of Bosniaks-Muslims. The Alliance brought together Muslims who studied outside of Yugoslavia during World War II, together with former imams of the German 13th Waffen-SS Division Handschar and former Young Muslims. It promoted the national name "Bosniak" with the aim of severing ties with Croatian and Serbian national identities.

== Fall of Yugoslavia ==
At the beginning of the Party of Democratic Action (est. 1990), the party also included a very influential secular nationalist grouping, led by Zulfikarpašić and Muhamed Filipović.

On 26 December 1991, Serbia, Montenegro, and the Serb rebel-held territory in Croatia (Serb Krajina) agreed that they would form a new "third Yugoslavia". Efforts were also made in 1991 to include Bosnia and Herzegovina within the federation, with negotiations between Milošević, Bosnia's Serbian Democratic Party, and the Bosniak proponent of union – Bosnia's Vice-President Adil Zulfikarpašić taking place on this matter. Zulfikarpašić believed that Bosnia could benefit from attempting to forge a union with Serbia, Montenegro, and Krajina; and promoted a compromise between the Serbs and Bosniaks, in which Serb Krajina and Bosniak Sanjak from Serbia would be annexed into a Greater Bosnia that within a union with Serbia and Montenegro, would secure both the unity of Serbs and Bosniaks. Zulfikarpašić's proposition opposed any cantonization of Bosnia. The Bosnian Serbs did not include Zulfikarpašić's proposition alongside their propositions. However Milosević continued negotiations with Zulfikarpašić to include Bosnia within a new Yugoslavia. Efforts to include the whole of Bosnia within a new Yugoslavia effectively terminated by late 1991 as Izetbegović planned to hold a referendum on independence while the Bosnian Serbs and Bosnian Croats formed autonomous territories.

Zulfikarpašić returned to Bosnia and Herzegovina and in the lead up to the Bosnian War, as Bosnia and Herzegovina held an independence referendum for independence, he stood alongside the future Bosnian president, Alija Izetbegović. He was a member of Izetbegović's Party of Democratic Action, but soon formed another party because of differing political views, the Muslim Bosniak Organisation with Muhamed Filipović.

== Post-war ==
In 2001, Zulfikarpašić established the Bosniak Institute in Sarajevo. In 2002, he was elected an honorary member of the Academy of Sciences and Arts of Bosnia and Herzegovina.

== Books ==
- Adil Zulfikarpašić (1998). The Bosniak. C.Hurst & Co. Ltd. ISBN 1-85065-339-9.Gace, N., Đilas, M. (1998), The Bosniak: Adil Zulfikarpasic, London, Hurst & Company
- Filandra, Š., Karic, E. (2004), The Bosniac Idea, Zagreb, Globus
- Imamović, M. (1996), Bošnjaci u emigraciji: monografija Bosanskih pogleda, Sarajevo, Bošnjački institut Zurich, Odjel Sarajevo
- Zulfikarpašić, A. (1991), Članci i intervjui povodom 70-godišnjice, Sarajevo, Bošnjački institut
- Zulfikarpašić, A., Gotovac, V., Tripalo M., Banac, I. (1995), Okovana Bosna, Zurich, Bošnjački institut
- Zulfikarpašić, A. (2005), Osvrti, Sarajevo, Bošnjački institut – Fondacija Adila Zulfikarpašića
- Zulfikarpasic, A., Bučar, F. (2001), Sudbonosni događaji: historijski presjek presudnih zbivanja i propusta, Sarajevo, Bošnjački institut – Fondacija Adila Zulfikarpašića
