= Zulfikar Pasha Čengić =

19th-century nobleman in Ottoman Bosnia

Pasha Zulfikar Čengić

Mütesellim of Foča
- In office 1832–1846
- Monarch: Mahmud II Abdulmejid I
- Governor: Ali Pasha Rizvanbegović
- In office 1828–1830
- Monarch: Mahmud II

Mutasarrif of Zvornik
- In office 1823/25–1823/25
- Monarch: Mahmud II
- Preceded by: Ali Pasha of Zvornik
- Succeeded by: Mahmud Pasha Fidahić

Personal details
- Born: Unknown date Miljevina, Foča, Bosnia, Ottoman Empire
- Died: 1846 Foča, Herzegovina, Ottoman Empire
- Resting place: Aladža Mosque, Foča, Republika Srpska, Bosnia and Herzegovina
- Relatives: Adil Zulfikarpašić (great-grandson), Bojan Zulfikarpašić (great-great-grandson)
- Nickname: Miljevina

Military service
- Allegiance: Ottoman Empire
- Battles/wars: Bosnian uprising (1831–1832)

Zulfikar Pasha Čengić (Serbo-Croatian: Zulfikar-paša Čengić) nicknamed Miljevina (died 1846) was an Ottoman Bosnian nobleman and a military leader. He is known for leading a penal expedition against the Montenegrin Drobnjaci tribe in 1812 and siding with the Sultan against the rebellious Bosnian ayans of Husein Gradaščević during the Bosnian uprising (1831–1832).

== Biography ==
Zulfikar Pasha was born in Miljevina near Foča into the noble Čengić family. His father was Salih Alay-Bey, and his grandfather was Zejnil Bey. He had sons Džafer, Salih, Alija and Jusuf Bey.

In 1811, Mustay Pasha of the Sanjak of Scutari organised an attack on Montenegro, directing his troops against the Piperi tribe. However, his campaign ended in defeat. The following year, he ordered Zulfikar Pasha to attack the Montenegrin Drobnjaci tribe. One part of the Ottoman army was commanded by Smail Agha Čengić. Other Montenegrin tribes joined the Drobnjaci tribe. Although the Ottomans suffered heavy casualties, they managed to defeat the Montenegrins. The houses of the Drobnjaci tribe were destroyed, with many people being killed and hundreds enslaved.

In 1813 he gained the title of pasha. Zulfikar Pasha fought against the Serb rebels during the First Serbian Uprising in 1813 and Hadži-Prodan's rebellion in 1814. In 1814 he was appointed a muhafazah and a mütesellim in Valjevo. According to Hamdija Kreševljaković, Zulfikar Pasha served as the mutasarrif of Zvornik in 1825, while Safvet-beg Bašagić writes that he served there in 1823. From 1828 to 1830 he was the mütesellim of Foča.

When the Bosnian ayans headed by Husein Gradaščević rebelled against the Sultan in 1831, they expelled the Bosnian governor who moved to Herzegovina in September 1831. Husein Gradaščević proclaimed himself a vizier, which was met with refusal amongst the Herzegovinian magnates. They designated Zulfikar Pasha to report to Aga Pasha that they do not accept Husein Gradaščević as a vizier and ask the Sultan to appoint someone else.

The Bosnian Muslims who opposed Gradaščević largely fled to Serbia, and Zulfikar Pasha was among them. In January 1832, he arrived in Užice and Price Miloš asked the local authorities to take care of them. Serbia also opposed Gradaščević, and for this reason, they maintained contact with Zulfikar Pasha and other loyalist nobles. By May 1832, the loyalist forces were able to retake the territory around the Drina river, which marked the eastern borders of the Bosnia Eyalet with Serbia, and both sides prepared for the decisive battle. Zulfikar Pasha was appointed as the mütesellim of Foča and together with Osman Pasha Gradaščević he was tasked with the reintroduction of the Sultan's authority in the re-taken territory.

After the loyalists won the war in 1833, Ali Pasha Rizvanbegović, the leader of the loyalists, was named the head of the Herzegovina Eyalet, which was exempted from the Bosnia Eyalet. Ali Pasha appointed his loyalists to important posts, including Zulfikar Pasha, who was reappointed as the mütesellim of Foča. By August 1838, however, the relations among the Herzegovinian magnates deteriorated. So much so that Smail Agha and Zulfikar Pasha reported Ali Pasha's wrongdoings to the Sultan.

Zulfikar Pasha died in Foča and was buried in the yard of the Aladža Mosque.
