= Kadić family =

The Kadić family (Serbo-Croatian: Kadići) is a family of Ottoman Bosnian noble heritage (a "bey family" or Serbo-Croatian: begovska porodica) that historically possessed land in the Bihać Municipality (a part of the historic Bosanska Krajina), especially in Golubić and Ripač. They were one of the 88 largest landowner families in Bosanska Krajina, who collectively owned 497 359 dunum of land. The family is likely of Turkic origin, descending from Jašar, who was the son of Crni ("Black") Muhamed-aga, who in turn was the son or grandson of Deli Murat-beg of Anadol (Anatolia). The name of the family likely derives from kadı, which refers to an Ottoman judge. International variations of the surname, mostly found in Germany and the United States, include Kadic, Cadic, Caddick, Kadich, Chadick, Cadick, Chadic, Kadick, Kadych, and Khadic.

Deli Murat-beg achieved recognition during the occupation of Bjelaj, which he received as an award by the Sultan (allegedly for capturing a king). He likely died around 1577 from battle-related wounds and the remains of his türbe are still in Bjelaj. He had three known sons or grandsons: Ibrahim-paša, Crni Muhamed-aga, and Hasan. Ibrahim-paša gained the title of pasha for his military accomplishments in Lika and Slavonia. He was schooled by the Sublime Porte and was later also the sanjak-bey of the Požega sanjak. He also established the village of Ripač and erected a mosque there, called Ibrahim-paša's Mosque. The influential Ibrahimpašić family of Bosanska Krajina descends from Ibrahim-paša. Not much is known about Crni Muhamed-aga, except that he was noted for his looks ("black moustached, with hawk-like eyes"), that he was a serhatlija or border soldier/frontiersman, and that he had three known sons: Jašar - from whom the Kadić of Golubić descend, Pašo and one whose name is unknown, but who was a dizdar. Hasan had two known sons: Mujaga and one whose name is unknown, but who went by the nickname Dupan.

After the fall of Austria-Hungary in 1918, nobility titles were no longer used in Bosnia. However, a large proportion of the land in and around Golubić and most of the mountain Bjelašnica is still owned by people bearing the surname of Kadić.
