= Čengić, Bosnia and Herzegovina =

Čengić Ченгић (Serbian)
- Village (Selo)
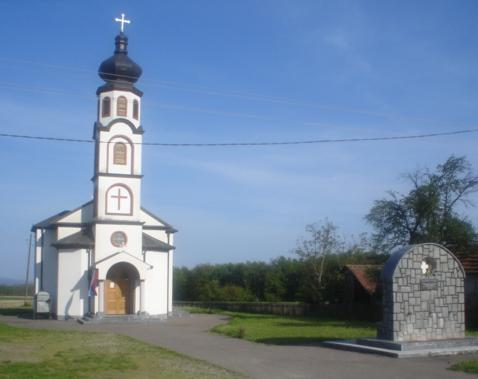
- A church in Čengić

- Location within Bosnia and Herzegovina
- Coordinates: 44°38′6″N 19°9′15″E
- Country: Bosnia and Herzegovina
- Entity: Republika Srpska
- Municipality: Bijeljina

Population (1991)
  - Total: 1,284
- Time zone: UTC+1 (CET)
  - Summer (DST): UTC+2 (CEST)
- Area code: +387 55

Čengić (Serbian Cyrillic: Ченгић) is a village in the municipality of Bijeljina, Republika Srpska, Bosnia and Herzegovina.

== About Čengić ==
To the north of Čengić is Modran while to the east is Obrijež and Ruhotina. Čengić is part of the municipality of Bijeljina which lies on the flat rich planes of Semberija.

== Population ==
The population census in 1991 showed Čengić had 1.284 inhabitants. 1278 were Serbs, 1 was Yugoslav, and 7 were of other nationalities.
