= Miljevina =

Miljevina Миљевина
- Village
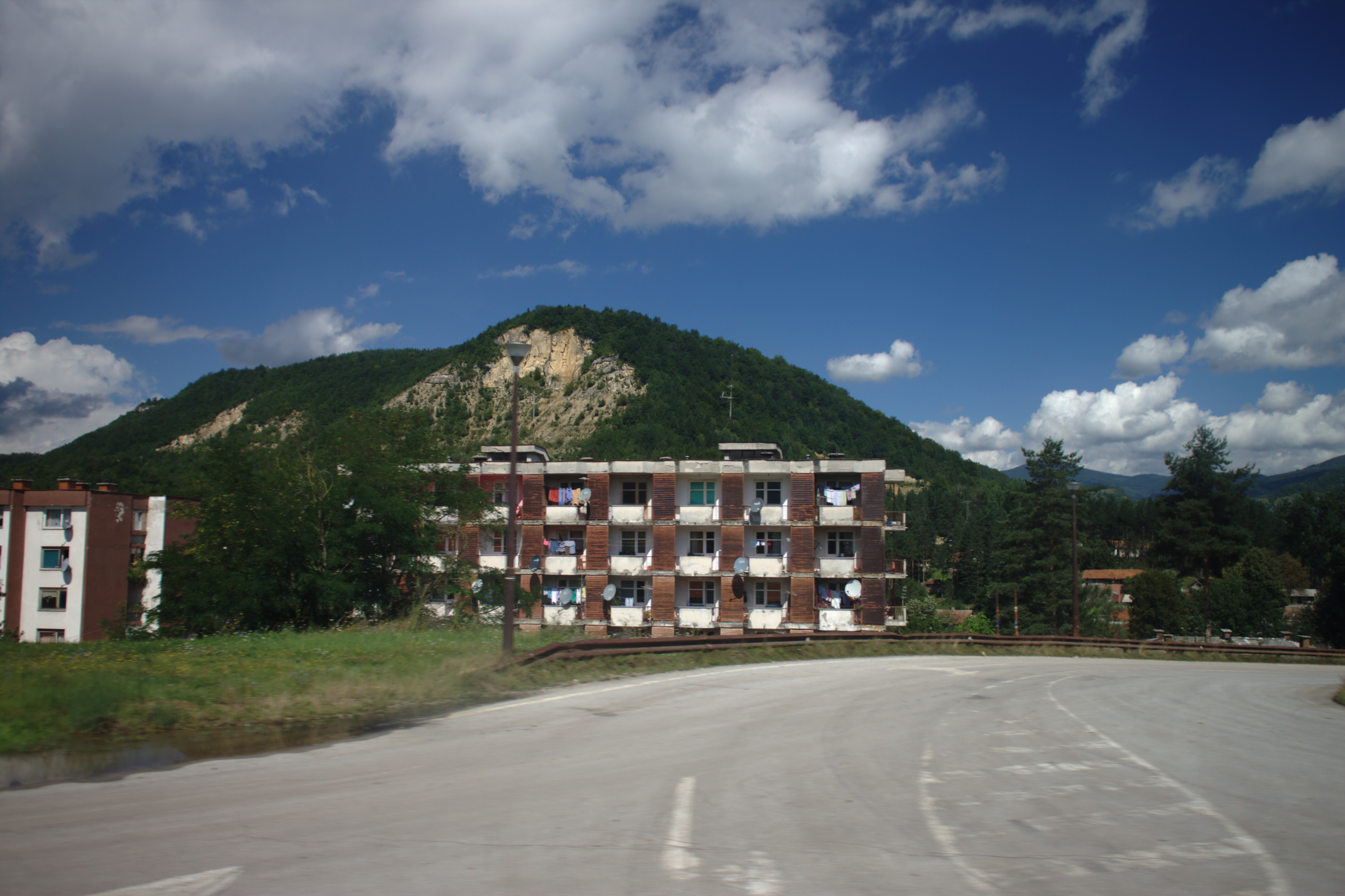
- A crossroad in the town of Miljevina, Bosnia, and Herzegovina

- Location within Bosnia and Herzegovina
- Coordinates: 43°31′N 18°39′E
- Country: Bosnia and Herzegovina
- Entity: Republika Srpska
- Municipality: Foča
- Time zone: UTC+1 (CET)
  - Summer (DST): UTC+2 (CEST)

Miljevina (Serbian Cyrillic: Миљевина) is a village in the municipality of Foča, Republika Srpska, an entity of Bosnia and Herzegovina.

== Demographics ==
Ethnic group	Population 1961	%	Population 1971	%	Population 1981	%	Population 1991	%	Population 2013	%
Serbs	233	92.20	404	99.26	921	59.23	943	53.49	979	95.70
Muslims/Bosniaks	13	5.20	1	0.25	550	35.37	730	41.40	29	2.83
Others	4	1.60	2	0.49	84	5.40	90	5.10	15	1.47
Total	250		407		1555		1763		1023	
