= Advanced maternal age =

Pregnancy at older ages

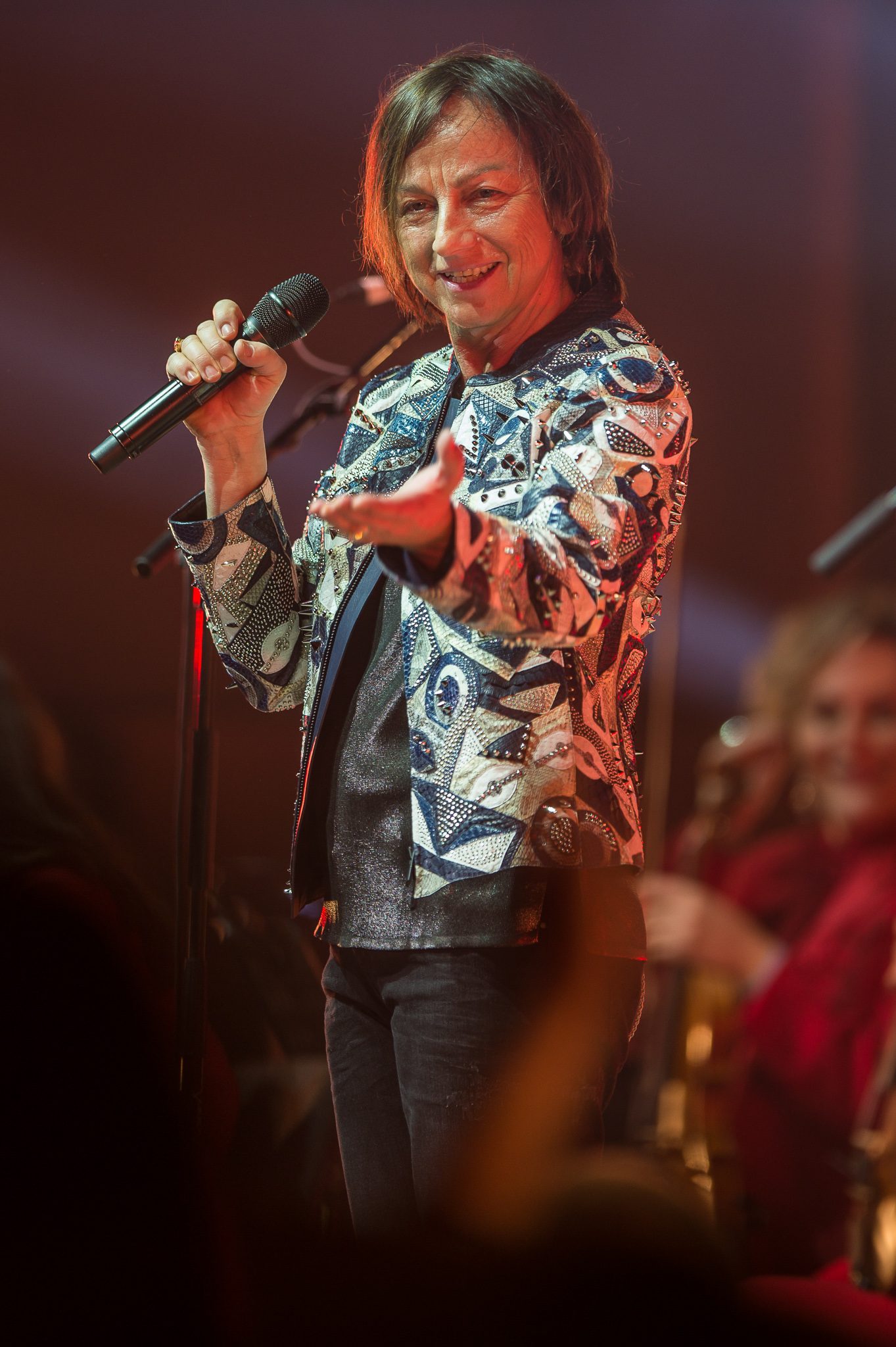
The Italian singer Gianna Nannini was 56 years old when she gave birth in November 2010.

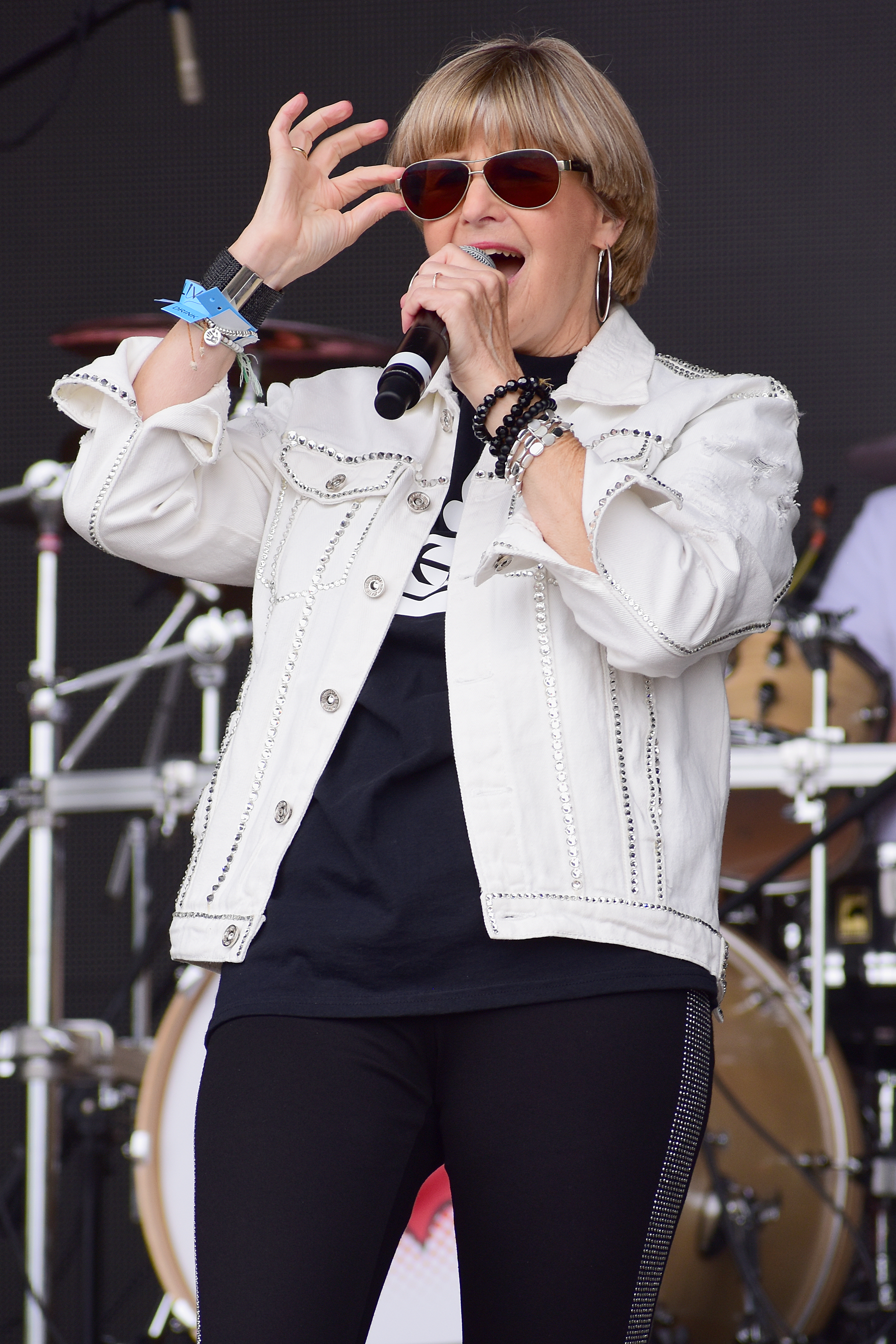
The British singer Hazell Dean was 52 years old when she gave birth in December 2004.

Advanced maternal age is the instance of a woman being of an older age at a stage of reproduction, although there are various definitions of specific age and stage of reproduction. The variability in definitions is in part explained by the effects of increasing age occurring as a continuum rather than as a threshold effect.

Average age at first childbirth has been increasing, especially in OECD countries, among which the highest average age is 32.6 years (South Korea) followed by 32.1 years (Ireland and Spain). In a number of European countries (Spain), the mean age of women at first childbirth has crossed the 30-year threshold. This process is not restricted to Europe. Japan and the United States are seeing average age at first birth on the rise, and increasingly the process is spreading to countries in the developing world such as China, Turkey and Iran. In the U.S., the average age of first childbirth was 26.9 in 2018.

Advanced maternal age is associated with adverse maternal and perinatal outcomes. Possible maternal complications due to advanced maternal age include preterm labor, pre-eclampsia, gestational diabetes mellitus, stillbirth, chromosomal abnormalities, spontaneous miscarriage and cesarean delivery. Advanced age can also increase the risk of infertility. Some of the possible fetal outcomes due to advanced maternal age include admission to neonatal intensive care units (NICU), intrauterine growth restrictions, low Apgar score, chromosomal abnormalities and infants smaller for gestational age. The corresponding paternal age effect is less pronounced.

== History ==
Average age of mothers

Having children well into middle age was not exceptional in the past, when families were larger and women often continued bearing children until the end of their reproductive age. What is so radical about this recent transformation is that it is the age at which women give birth to their first child, which is becoming comparatively high, leaving an ever more constricted window of biological opportunity for second and subsequent children, should they be desired. Unsurprisingly, high first-birth ages and high rates of birth postponement accompany low and lowest-low fertility.

This association has now become especially clear, since the postponement of first births in a number of countries has now continued unabated for more than three decades and has become one of the most prominent characteristics of fertility patterns in developed societies. A variety of authors (in particular, Lesthaeghe) have argued that fertility postponement constitutes the "hallmark" of what has become known as the "second demographic transition".

Others have proposed that the postponement process itself constitutes a separate "third transition". On this latter view, modern developed societies exhibit a kind of dual fertility pattern, with the majority of births being concentrated either among very young or increasingly older mothers. This is sometimes known as the "rectangularisation" of fertility patterns.

== Possible factors that influence childbearing age ==
There are many factors that may influence childbearing age in women, although they are mostly correlations without certain causations. For instance, older maternal age at first childbirth is associated with higher educational attainment and income.

Two studies show that generous parental leave allowances in Britain encourage young motherhood and that parental-leave allowance reduces postponement in Sweden.

== Effects ==
=== Decreased fertility ===
Cumulative percentage and average age for women reaching subfertility, sterility, irregular menstruation and menopause

A woman's fertility peaks during her twenties and first half of her thirties, after which it starts to decline. Advanced maternal age causes an increased risk of female infertility. A woman's individual level of fertility can be tested through a variety of methods.

According to Henri Leridon, PhD, an epidemiologist with the French Institute of Health and Medical Research, of women trying to get pregnant, without using fertility drugs or in vitro fertilization:

- At age 30, 75% will have a conception ending in a live birth within one year, and 91% will have a conception ending in a live birth within four years.
- At age 35, 66% will have a conception ending in a live birth within one year, and 84% will have a conception ending in a live birth within four years.
- At age 40, 44% will have a conception ending in a live birth within one year, and 64% will have a conception ending in a live birth within four years.

Menopause typically occurs between 44 and 58 years of age. DNA testing is rarely carried out to confirm claims of maternity at advanced ages, but in one large study, among 12,549 African and Middle Eastern immigrant mothers, confirmed by DNA testing, only two mothers were found to be older than 50, the oldest mother being 52.1 years with natural conception (and the youngest mother 10.7 years old). IVF can be used post-menopause, with the oldest confirmed mother through this method being 73.

=== Risk of birth defects ===
A woman's risk of having a baby with chromosomal abnormalities increases with her age. Down syndrome is the most common chromosomal birth defect, and a woman's risk of having a baby with Down syndrome is:

Risk of having a baby with Down syndrome

Age	Risk
20	1/( 2 000 )
24	1/( 1 300 )
25	1/( 1 200 )
29	1/ 950
30	1/ 900

Age	Risk
34	1/ 450
35	1/ 350
39	1/150
40	1/ 100

Age	Risk
44	1/ 40
45	1/ 30
49	1/ 10
50	1/ 10

=== Other effects ===
Advanced maternal age is associated with adverse outcomes in the perinatal period, which may be caused by detrimental effects on decidual and placental development.

The risk of the mother dying before the child becomes an adult increases with advanced maternal age, as seen in the following data from France in 2007:

Maternal age at childbirth (years)	20	25	30	35	40	45
Risk of mother not surviving to the child's 18th birthday (in %)	0.6%	1.0%	1.6%	2.6%	3.8%	5.5%

The above table is not to be confused with maternal mortality.

Advanced maternal age continues to be associated with a range of adverse pregnancy outcomes including low birth weight, pre-term birth, stillbirth, unexplained fetal death, and increased rates of Caesarean section. However, over time, improvements in (and improvements in access to) medical services and social resources have decreased the negative association between older maternal age and low birth weight.

According to a meta analysis from 2017 of 63 cohort studies and 12 case control studies, advanced maternal age (≥35 years) increased the risk of stillbirth (OR 1.75, 95%CI 1.62–1.89). It also increased the risk for FGR (fetal growth restriction) (OR 1.23; 95%CI 1.01–1.52). It is suggested that the rise in the risk could be due to conditions related to placental pathology/dysfunction.

On the other hand, advanced maternal age is associated with a more stable family environment, higher socio-economic position, higher income and better living conditions, as well as better parenting practices (including better disciplinary methods). A qualitative study on couples in the United States who used in-vitro fertilization to conceive their first child when the woman was aged 40 or older at the time of delivery found that 72% of the women and 57% of the men believed that they had enhanced emotional preparedness for parenting which benefitted both their children and themselves. In quantitative studies, mother's older age at first birth has been associated with increases in children's psychiatric health, language skills, cognitive ability, and fewer social and emotional difficulties. Further, a study in the United Kingdom showed that older maternal age at first birth was associated with fewer hospital admissions and fewer unintentional injuries for children up to age 5 and a greater likelihood of having had all of their immunizations by 9 months of age – all outcomes used as indicators of child wellbeing in reports from the World Health Organisation.

Risks associated with childbearing over the age of 50 include an increased incidence of gestational diabetes, hypertension, delivery by caesarean section, miscarriage, preeclampsia, and placenta previa. In comparison to mothers between 20 and 29 years of age, mothers over 50 are at almost three times the risk of low birth weight, premature birth, and extremely premature birth; their risk of extremely low birth weight, small size for gestational age, and fetal mortality was almost double.

== Changes in interpregnancy interval ==
Kalberer et al. have shown that despite the older maternal age at birth of the first child, the time span between the birth of the first and the second child, the interpregnancy interval, decreased over the last decades. If purely biological factors were at work, it could be argued that interpregnancy interval should have increased, as fertility declines with age, which would make it harder for the woman to get a second child after postponed birth of the first one. This not being the case shows that sociologic factors (see above) prime over biological factors in determining interpregnancy interval.

With technological developments, cases of post-menopausal pregnancies have occurred, and there are several known cases of older women carrying a pregnancy to term, usually with in vitro fertilization of a donor egg. A 61-year-old Brazilian woman, aided by the implantation of a donor egg, gave birth to twins in October 2012.

== Ovarian aging ==
As women age, they experience a decline in reproductive performance leading to menopause. This decline is tied to a decline in the number of ovarian follicles. Although about 1 million oocytes are present at birth in the human ovary, only about 500 of them (about 0.05%) ovulate, and the rest do not (ovarian follicle atresia). The decline in ovarian reserve appears to occur at a constantly increasing rate with age, and leads to nearly complete exhaustion of the reserve by about age 51. As ovarian reserve and fertility decline with age, there is also a parallel increase in pregnancy failure and meiotic errors resulting in chromosomally abnormal conceptions.

Titus et al. have proposed an explanation for the decline in ovarian reserve with age. They showed that as women age, double-strand breaks accumulate in the DNA of their primordial follicles. Primordial follicles are immature primary oocytes surrounded by a single layer of granulosa cells. An enzyme system is present in oocytes that normally accurately repairs DNA double-strand breaks. This repair system is referred to as homologous recombinational repair, and it is especially active during meiosis. Meiosis is the general process by which germ cells are formed in eukaryotes, and it appears to be an adaptation for efficiently removing damages in germ line DNA by homologous recombinational repair (see Origin and function of meiosis). Human primary oocytes are present at an intermediate stage of meiosis, that is prophase I (see Oogenesis). Titus et al. also showed that expression of four key DNA repair genes that are necessary for homologous recombinational repair (BRCA1, MRE11, Rad51 and ATM) decline in oocytes with age. This age-related decline in ability to repair double-strand damages can account for the accumulation of these damages, which then likely contributes to the decline in ovarian reserve.

Women with an inherited mutation in the DNA repair gene BRCA1 undergo menopause prematurely, suggesting that naturally occurring DNA damages in oocytes are repaired less efficiently in these women, and this inefficiency leads to early reproductive failure. Genomic data from about 70,000 women were analyzed to identify protein-coding variation associated with age at natural menopause. Pathway analyses identified a major association with DNA damage response genes, particularly those expressed during meiosis and including a common coding variant in the BRCA1 gene.

== Epidemiology ==
In the United States, between 1997 and 1999, 539 births were reported among mothers over age 50 (four per 100,000 births), with 194 being over 55. In the US, the average age at which women bore their first child advanced from 21.4 years old in 1970 to 26.9 in 2018.

The German Federal Institute for Population Research stated in 2015 the percentage for women with an age of at least 35 giving birth to a child was 25.9%. This figure rose from 7.6% in 1981. According to statistics from the Human Fertilisation and Embryology Authority, in the UK more than 20 babies are born to women over age 50 per year through in vitro fertilization with the use of donor oocytes (eggs).

== List of oldest mothers ==
Erramatti Mangamma, who gave birth at the age of 74 through in-vitro fertilisation via caesarean section in the city of Hyderabad, India, is believed to currently hold the record for being the oldest living mother. She delivered twin baby girls, making her also the oldest mother to give birth to twins. The previous record for being the oldest living mother was believed to be held by Daljinder Kaur Gill from Amritsar, India, who gave birth to a baby boy at age 72 through in-vitro fertilisation.

Maria del Carmen Bousada de Lara formerly held the record of being the oldest verified mother; she was aged 66 years 358 days when she gave birth to twins, 130 days older than Adriana Iliescu, who gave birth in 2005 to a baby girl. In both cases, the children were conceived through IVF with donor eggs. The oldest verified mother to conceive naturally (listed currently as of 26 January 2017 in the Guinness Records) is Dawn Brooke (Guernsey); she conceived a son at the age of 59 in 1997.

Birth	Age	Date	Name	Country	Notes
c. 1944–1947	75 years (also 72 years)	October 2019	Prabha Devi	India	Prabha Devi gave birth to a daughter in October 2019. She stated her age as 75 at the time of birth but she could not verify it as the couple did not furnish their age-related documents. Doctors said she looked between 72 and 75.
c. 1944–1945	74 years (also 75 years)	September 2019	Erramatti Mangamma	India	Mangamma gave birth to twins at the age of 74 through in-vitro fertilisation via caesarean section in Hyderabad, India. Some news outlets initially reported her age as 73, but her doctor subsequently produced a birth certificate stating she was 74.
1944	72 years	19 April 2016	Daljinder Kaur	India	Daljinder Kaur gave birth to a son, Arman, on 19 April 2016, after nearly five decades of marriage and two unsuccessful IVF tries. Kaur stated her age as 70 at the time of birth, but the clinic where she had IVF treatments stated she was 72.
1953	70 years	29 November 2023	Safina Namukwaya	Uganda	Safina Namukwaya gave birth aged 70 to twins via caesarean section at the Women's Hospital International and Fertility Centre in Kampala on 29 November 2023, as reported by the hospital via Facebook, claiming she was Africa's oldest mother. She had previously given birth to a baby girl in 2020. Namukwaya reported that her husband had abandoned her after learning that she was expecting twins.
1938	70 years	November 2008	Rajo Devi Lohan	India	Rajo Devi Lohan gave birth to a daughter, Naveen, at the age of 70. Lohan's health soon deteriorated and she nearly died of complications following childbirth. As of October 2014, Lohan and her husband were still alive.
1938	70 years	27 June 2008	Omkari Panwar	India	Omkari Panwar gave birth to twins, a boy and a girl, in Muzaffarnagar, Uttar Pradesh, via emergency Caesarean section, on 27 June 2008, at the age of 70. The babies weighed 2 pounds (0.91 kg) each. Omkari became pregnant through IVF treatment with a single oocytes donor, process which she and her husband pursued in order to produce a male heir. Omkari has two adult daughters and five grandchildren. However, Omkari does not have a birth certificate, her age has been estimated by her claim that she was 9 years old when the British Raj left India in 1947. In response to hearing that she had possibly broken the record for world's oldest mother, Omkari stated, "If I am the world's oldest mother it means nothing to me. I just want to see my new babies and care for them while I am still able."
1952	68 years	14 April 2020	Margaret Adenuga	Nigeria	Margaret Adenuga went through three previous IVF procedures before finally having twins. The babies were delivered via caesarian section at 37 weeks at the Lagos University Teaching Hospital (LUTH) but the hospital only recently made the news public to give the first-time mother time to recuperate.
1952	67 years	25 October 2019	Xinju Tian	China	Xinju Tian is the oldest mother to conceive naturally in China. She got pregnant at 67 and gave birth on 25 October 2019, via caesarean section. Tian and her husband Huang Weiping, 68, named their daughter Tianci, meaning "heaven sent" in Mandarin Chinese. The couple's son and daughter, both in their mid 40's, have children of their own in college and secondary school were unsupportive of their mother, along with many other doctors working at Tian's former workplace, Zaozhuang Maternity and Child Health Care Hospital, where she worked as a paediatrician.
5 January 1940	66 years, 11 months, 24 days	29 December 2006	Maria del Carmen Bousada de Lara	Spain	Maria del Carmen Bousada de Lara called Carmela Bousada (b. 5 January 1940, d. 11 July 2009, age 69), from Cádiz, Spain, gave birth to twin sons, Pau and Christian, at Sant Pau Hospital in Barcelona, Spain, on 29 December 2006, at the age of 66 years, 11 months, and 24 days—one week before her 67th birthday. The babies were delivered prematurely by Caesarean section and weighed 3.5 lb (1.6 kg) each. M.C. Bousada became pregnant after receiving IVF treatment with oocytes donation and two sperm donors selected from a catalog from a fertility clinic in Los Angeles, California, which claims that Bousada informed them that she was 55 (their maximum age for IVF treatment). Her family was unaware that she had gone to the United States to undergo fertility treatment prior to the births, and thought she was joking when she told them she was pregnant. Manuel Bousada de Lara, Maria del Carmen's older brother, criticized her decision, expressing concern over whether she would be able to raise children at her age. In response to such concerns, Bousada stated, "My mum lived to be 101 and there's no reason I couldn't do the same". Maria died on 11 July 2009, from stomach cancer, which she developed soon after giving birth to her twins; her sons were only 2 1/2 years old then.
31 May 1938	66 years, 7 months, 16 days	16 January 2005	Adriana Iliescu	Romania	Adriana Iliescu, born on 31 May 1938, gave birth to a daughter Eliza Maria at a hospital in Bucharest, Romania by Caesarean section on 16 January 2005, at the age of 66 years, 7 months and 16 days. After undergoing IVF using donated eggs, Iliescu initially became pregnant with triplets, but one of the fetuses died in utero. The other two were delivered by caesarean section, but one of them was stillborn. New York Daily News said that she was the oldest recorded woman to deliver a child until 2008 when Omkari Panwar gave birth to twins.
1933	66 years	April 1999	Harriet Stole	United Kingdom	Harriet Stole of Southgate, North London gave birth to a son, Henry Thomas, in April 1999 at age 66 after agreeing to be a surrogate mother for her infertile daughter in-law (Lucy Handerson Stole). Lucy and her husband- Harriet's son (Ross Stole) had an egg fertilized and later implanted into the womb of Harriet. The child was born prematurely at 8 months, weighing 4 lb 5 oz (1.96 kg), but survived and is healthy.
1943	66 years	28 May 2009	Elizabeth Adeney	United Kingdom	Elizabeth "Lizzie" Adeney, aged 66, gave birth to a 5 lb 3 oz (2.35 kg) son, Jolyon, in Addenbrooke's Hospital, Cambridge, England, on 28 May 2009, becoming Britain's oldest mother. The child, who was conceived through IVF treatment in Ukraine from oocyte and sperm donations, was delivered by Caesarean section.
1945	66 years	February 2011	Valentyna Pidverbna	Ukraine	Valentyna Pidverbna, unmarried woman, aged 66, gave birth to her first child, a girl weighing 3.3 kg and being 54 cm height in Chernihiv, Ukraine in February 2011. She underwent three cycles of IVF treatment to achieve positive results.
1944	66 years	June 2010	Bhateri Devi Singh	India	Bhateri Devi, previously childless Indian woman, gave birth to triplets, two boys and a girl, in Alewa, Haryana, North of Delhi, at the age of 66, after IVF treatment with oocytes donation. One of the triplets died some days after the birth. As of October 2014, Devi was still alive.
1938	65 years	9 April 2003	Satyabhama Mahapatra	India	Satyabhama Mahapatra of Nayagarh, Odisha, India gave birth to a son on 9 April 2003, in Raipur, at the age of 65. The baby, weighing 6 lb 8 oz (2.95 kg) was born by Caesarean section. Mahapatra became pregnant through the help of IVF using an ovum donated by 26-year-old niece Veenarani Mahapatra (of her husband Krishnachandra Mahapatra) and spermatozoons from the husband of the latter. Krishnachandra could not fertilize his niece's oocyte himself. This was their first child after 50 years of marriage. Doctors had attempted to persuade the couple not to have IVF. Satyabhama Mahapatra was also hospitalized for the last trimester of her pregnancy.
1950	65 years	May 2015	Haya Shahar	Israel	Haya Shahar, of Bnei Brak, Israel, who was unable to have a baby during her 46-year marriage with Shmuel, gave birth to a son in May 2015 at Meir Medical Center in Kfar Saba. She became the oldest woman in Israel to give birth. The IVF was performed abroad since it is illegal in Israel to perform IVF on a woman over 54.
1950	65 years	May 2015	Annegret Raunigk	Germany	Annegret Raunigk, a Berliner, age 55 years and 9 months, professor of English and Russian, already the mother of 12 children (5 girls and 7 boys) ages 34 to 13 years – Antje (♀) 34, Ellen (♀) 31, Bjarne (♂) 30, Torben (♂) 27, Lieven (♂) 25, Tjard (♂) 24, Inken (♀) 23, Svea (♀) 20, Lennart (♂) 19, Velten (♂) 18, Ingvar (♂) 17, and Auda (♀) 13, all with Nordic names to be distinct from those of her students, born of five different fathers, and grandmother of six grandchildren ages 16 years to 6 months, gave birth, in late October 2005, in Berlin, Germany, to a daughter, Lelia, her 13th child, conceived naturally. Shortly before this last delivery, she had to flee with her six cadets children still living at home, in Hungary, where is born her last grandson. In May 2015, Raunigk gave birth to quadruplets at age 65 after IVF with donated eggs.
1950	64 years	23 February 2004	Papathiammal Subramaniam	India	Papathiammal Subramaniam gave birth to a son in Erode, Tamil Nadu, India on 23 February 2004, at the age of 64. The baby was delivered by Caesarean section and weighed 1.75 kg (3.9 lb). He was conceived through IVF, with an ovum donated by a 30-year-old Papathiammal's cousin and the sperm of Papathiammal's husband, a 74-year-old farmer until then remained without son.
1942	64 years	9 October 2006	Memnune Tiryaki	Turkey	Memnune Tiryaki gave birth to her first child, son Yasin, in Istanbul, Turkey, on 9 October 2006, at the age of 64, after IVF treatment with oocytes donation, practiced in Turkish-occupied section of Cyprus. Tiryaki and her 62-year-old husband were trying to have children for 35 years.
February 1933	63 years, 9 months	7 November 1996	Arceli Keh	United States	Arceli Keh of Highland, California, gave birth to a daughter, Cynthia, on 7 November 1996, at the age of 63 years and 9 months. She and her husband, Isagani, had been married for 16 years when they decided to try to have a child. In order to gain admission to a fertility program that had an upper age limit of 55, Kehs told doctors that she was 50, although she was in fact 10 years older at the time. Five IVF transfer cycles were required before Arceli Keh successfully became pregnant. The ovum came from a donor and was fertilized with sperm from Arceli's husband.
1948	63 years	22 March 2011	Tineke Geessink	Netherlands	Tineke Geessink of Harlingen, Netherlands, gave birth to daughter Meagan on 22 March 2011, at the age of 63. Single mother Tineke Geessink, currently the oldest woman in the Netherlands to ever give birth, explained to press that she had always longed for a child and chose to do so "whatever way she could". She was treated by the famous Italian doctor Severino Antinori, who implanted a donated oocyte fertilized with donated sperm; the Dutch limit for such treatments is at age 45. The announcement of Geessink's pregnancy sparked a debate about the ethics of late motherhood in the Netherlands. Geessink died on 25 June 2020, leaving behind her, then, 9-year-old daughter.
October 1932	62 years, 9 months	18 July 1994	Rosanna Della Corte	Italy	Rosanna Della Corte of Canino, Italy gave birth to a son, Riccardo, on 18 July 1994, at the age of 62. After their first son was killed when a car crashed into his motorcycle in 1991, Rosanna Della Corte and her husband, Mauro, decided to attempt to have a second child. The couple tried to adopt, but were unable to, as under Italian law an adoptive parent could be no more than 40 years older than their potential child. Mauro read in the newspaper about an Italian doctor, Severino Antinori, who had helped a woman in her late 50s have a child. With Dr. Antinori's help, the Della Cortes conceived through IVF with oocytes donation and Mauro's sperm. Rosanna, 60, became pregnant on the first attempt, but miscarried after 40 days, and it took 6 more attempts before there was success. She was then just 62.
1939	62 years	August 1992	Concetta Ditessa	Italy	Concetta Ditessa, a housewife from a Calabrian village in southern Italy, was due to give birth to a boy in August 1992. She was impregnated with an egg from a 30-year-old woman that was fertilized with sperm from Ditessa's husband, who is 53. There is no trace of an article about her childbirth, but as her pregnancy was reported at around 6 months' gestation, she probably did not miscarry.
1939	62 years	14 May 2001	Jeanine Salomone	France	Jeanine Salomone, French retired teacher, gave birth to a son, Benoît-David, on 14 May 2001, in Fréjus, Var, France, at the age of 62. It is against the law in France for post-menopausal women to receive IVF, so she went to the US for treatment. The case caused some ethical debate because the two eggs donated to Jeanine by a Californian woman were inseminated with sperm from Jeanine's brother, Robert: one was brought to term by Jeanine, the other by the donor as surrogate, who will give birth the week after, on 22 May 2001, to Marie-Cécile, her biological daughter promised to Jeanine. Their doctor was not informed that Jeanine and Robert were sister and brother; he thought that they were a married couple. The infants were reportedly born into a fraught family atmosphere in which Jeanine and Robert hate each other and are wrangling over a family inheritance. Jeanine Salomone died on 18 June 2015, aged 75.
1942	62 years	12 April 2004	Amma Bhavani	India	Amma Bhavani, of Thiruvananthapuram, southern India, gave birth to a son by Caesarean section on 12 April 2004, at the age of 62, after an IVF treatment with oocytes donation fertilized by sperm taken from the sperm bank. The boy named Kannan drowned in a bucket in 2006, and in 2008 Bhavani, aged 66, was preparing for the second IVF attempt.
c. 1944–1947	62 years (also 59 years)	19 February 2006	Janise Wulf	United States	Janise Wulf of Redding, California, gave birth to a boy, Adam Charles, her 12th child, on 19 February 2006, at the age of 62. The baby was delivered by Caesarean section, weighing 6 lb 10 oz (3.01 kg), and was conceived through in-vitro fertilization (IVF). Her doctor stated that, for women over 35, giving birth can have risks, but he agreed to oversee the procedure because Janise Wulf was in good health. She and her second husband, Scott, said that they decided to have children together because Scott had not had any children in his previous marriage, and because they did not want their other son, Ian, born late 2002, also conceived through IVF, to grow up an only child. Of the 10 children Janise Wulf had previously, before Ian, the oldest was 40 at the time of the birth, and the youngest was 24. Janise Wulf also has 20 grandchildren and 3 great-grandchildren.
1944	62 years	5 July 2006	Patricia "Patti" Rashbrook Farrant	United Kingdom	Patricia Rashbrook, already mother of 3 adult children, ages 26, 22, and 18, from her first union, gave birth to a son, Jude, in Brighton, England, on 5 July 2006, at the age of 62. She and her husband, John Farrant, received, in Russia, IVF treatment from the same Italian fertility expert who the Della Cortes had consulted, Severino Antinori. The birth of the baby, which was born by Caesarean section and weighed 6 lb 10.5 oz (3.02 kg), sparked debate over the ethics of late motherhood in the U.K.
1945	62 years	July 2007	Mileva Radulovic	Montenegro	Mileva Radulovic of Danilovgrad, northwest of Podgorica, Montenegro, gave birth in July 2007, at the age of 62. Radulovic and her 69-year-old husband Sreten became first time parent after 35 years of marriage with the help of IVF treatment. As of March 2015, Mileva was a widow and her son, Savo, was a schoolboy.
1948	62 years	5 May 2010	Krasimira Dimitrova	Bulgaria	Bulgarian psychiatrist Krasimira Dimitrova, from Ruse, Bulgaria, gave birth on 5 May 2010, to female twins, Mary and Jacqueline, weighing only 0.5 and 0.9 kg, after IVF treatment, at the age of 62. She decided to become pregnant after she was refused the option of adoption because of her age. Jacqueline died on 13 June 2010. Dimitrova was initially impregnated with triplets, but later doctors decided to remove one of the foetuses. She is only the second known woman aged over 60 that has given birth to twins. As of April 2018, Dimitrova was still alive, and Mary was in the second grade.
1953	62 years	February 2015	Galina Shubenina	Russia	Galina Shubenina of Moscow gave birth to a daughter in February 2015, at the age of 62. She wanted to have a child after the death of her son from previous marriage.
1927	61 years	16 January 1988	Cecilia Tuaileva	Australia	Cecilia Tuaileva, Australian woman, gave birth to a son on 16 January 1988, at the age of 61. She has used IVF with oocytes donation fertilized by her husband's sperm.
1931	61 years	27 July 1992	Liliana Cantadori	Italy	Liliana Cantadori gave birth to a son in Modena, Italy on 27 July 1992, at the age of 61. She used IVF with oocytes donation fertilized by her husband's sperm.
1950	61 years	13 February 2011	Kristine Casey	United States	Kristine Casey gave birth to her own grandson Finnean Lee on 13 February 2011, at Prentice Women's Hospital in Chicago, Illinois, at the age of 61. She chose to act as a surrogate for her 36-year-old daughter Sara Connell, who is infertile. Kidney complications affecting the surrogate mother shortly after birth were quickly resolved.
1951	61 years	26 October 2012	Antônia Letícia Asti	Brazil	Antônia Letícia Asti, a Brazilian woman from Santos, 40 km south-east São Paulo, State of São Paulo, gave birth, two months before term, to twins, Sofia and Roberto, weighing 900 g (1.98 lb) each, on 26 October 2012, one week after her a 61st birthday, after a post-menopausal IVF treatment using her own frozen oocytes fertilized by her husband (age 55 at the twins birth) remaining after their three previous unsuccessful attempts since 1992.
1958	61 years	25 March 2019	Cecile Eledge	United States	Cecile Eledge, a woman living in Nebraska, gave birth to her own granddaughter Uma on 25 March 2019, at the age of 61. She chose to be a gestational surrogate for her son and his husband and used IVF with oocytes donated from her son-in-law's sister and fertilized with her son's sperm.
23 February 1949	60 years, 10 months, 19 days	11 January 2010	Lia Georgia Triff	Romania	Princess Lia Georgia Triff, wife of Prince Paul-Philippe Hohenzollern disputed claimant to the throne of Romania, gave birth in Romania to the Prince Carol Ferdinand Hohenzollern on 11 January 2010; born on 23 February 1949, she was then 60 years, 10 months, and 19 days. She previously had a daughter born in 1973 from her first union as the fifth wife of lawyer Melvin Belli Later, Lia Triff alleged that she used her own frozen eggs.
1935	60 years	1995	Haristoula Karioti	Greece	Haristoula Karioti from Rhodes, Greece, gave birth to twin sons at the age of 60, after IVF treatment in Athens, Greece. She was pregnant with triplets, but the doctors later decided to reduce the number of fetuses by one. She entered menopause years after the birth of her children - her mother, too, had entered menopause at a very late age.
1937	60 years	November 1997	Elizabeth Ann "Liz" Jeffrey Buttle	United Kingdom	Elizabeth Ann Jeffrey "Liz" Buttle, of Wales, already mother of a 41-year-old daughter, Belinda, she had at the age of 19, gave birth to a son, Joe, in November 1997, at the age of 60, after she had informed doctors that she was 49, although she was 59 actually, in order to be eligible for IVF. Buttle's husband died of a heart attack several years earlier; she started a new relationship and was desperate to have another child. Her only previous child, daughter Belinda, was born in 1956, when Liz was 19, so she is probably the woman with the longest interval between two births. As of September 2006, Buttle was still alive.
1947	60 years	22 May 2007	Frieda Birnbaum	United States	Dr Frieda Birnbaum of Saddle River, New Jersey, gave birth to twin sons, Jake and Jared, on 22 May 2007, at the age of 60. The babies weighed 4 lb 11 oz (2.13 kg) each and were delivered by Caesarean section. Frieda Birnbaum underwent IVF at a South African fertility clinic specializing in older women. She and her husband, who have a 6-year-old son and two adult children, a 33-year-old son and a 29-year-old daughter, said that they wanted their younger son to have siblings close in age. Hospital officials believe Dr Frieda Birnbaum may be the oldest woman to give birth to twins in the United States.
1949	60 years	February 2009	Ranjit Hayer	Canada	Ranjit Hayer of Calgary, Alberta, gave birth to twin boys, in February 2009, at the age of 60, became pregnant through fertility treatments and IVF practiced in India, after several miscarriages in several years.
1950	60 years	25 May 2010	Wu Cheng	China	Wu Cheng, 60-year-old Chinese woman, gave birth to twin girls prematurely via Caesarean section in Hefei on 25 May 2010. The woman and her husband decided to go through IVF treatment after the death of their 28-year-old daughter Tingting and son-in-law. The woman has said: "The girls give me and my husband the courage to live on. Despite the fact that we are old, we have the confidence to bring them up."
1952	60 years	26 January 2012	Raju Ben	India	Raju Ben of gave birth to a son in Jaipur in January 2012, at the age of 60. Married for 40 years, she suffered with four miscarriages in the past and had multiple surgeries on her tubes & uterus because of tuberculosis, ovarian cysts, etc., thus making her impossible to conceive, so she and her husband decided to try IVF.
1955	60 years	May 2015	Punjiben Patel	India	Punjiben Patel of Vond village of Bhachau in Kutch district, Gujarat, gave birth to a son in May 2015, at the age of 60. Married in 1982, she and her husband failed to conceive naturally. Patel became pregnant after the first attempt of IVF.
1957	60 years	20 June 2017	Atifa Nokić	Serbia	Atifa Nokić of Novi Pazar, Serbia, gave birth on 20 June 2017, at the age of 60. Nokić and her 68-year-old husband Šerif became fifth time parents with the help of IVF treatment.
11 August 1946	59 years, 9 months, 11 days	22 May 2006	Lauren Cohen	United States	Lauren Cohen of Paramus, New Jersey, born on 11 August 1946, already mother of a 27-year-old daughter, Renee, of her first marriage, gave birth to twins, a boy and a girl, Giselle & Gregory, in New York, on 22 May 2006, at the age of 59 years, 9 months, and 11 days. Lauren Cohen and her husband, Frank Garcia, had previously had a daughter, Raquel, together through IVF in December 2004, using the husband's sperm and an egg from a donor. The couple, faced with either giving away the embryos left over from the first IVF treatment or letting them be destroyed, decided to try again. As to why she chose to have children at such a late age, with a husband approximately 20 years her junior, Lauren Cohen stated, "I just thought it would be unfair to Frank for him to marry me and never have the opportunity to have a child. He never asked me to have a child, but I knew it would make him happy".
1934	59 years	25 December 1993	Jennifer F.	United Kingdom	Jennifer F. (not released name), millionnaire British businesswoman, gave birth to twin boys in a London hospital on 25 December 1993, at the age of 59, after undergoing IVF treatment in Rome, Italy, with the help of Dr. Severino Antinori. The oocytes from an Italian 22-year-old donor and the sperm of Jennifer's 45-year-old husband were used. This case produced much ethical debate in UK.
1938	59 years	20 August 1997	Dawn Brooke	Guernsey	Dawn Brooke of Guernsey, Channel Islands, gave birth to a son by Caesarian section on 20 August 1997, at the age of 59. She became pregnant unexpectedly, initially mistaking the symptoms she experienced for cancer, and is the oldest mother currently known to have conceived naturally. It has been speculated that the hormone replacement therapy which she had may have contributed to her ability to ovulate past menopause.
1945	59 years (also 57 years)	October 2004	Sandra Lennon	United Kingdom	Sandra Lennon of Byfleet, Surrey, who already had two adult children from her first marriage, gave birth to her son Alex in October 2004, at the age of 59. It was her second child born after IVF treatment, the first of them, son Joshua, had been born in the beginning of 2003.
1946	59 years	13 September 2005	Svetlana Glazyrina	Russia	Svetlana Glazyrina, of Sochi, Russia, gave birth to her first child, a boy, Camille Rinat, weighing 3.8 kg and 54 cm tall, on 13 September 2005, at the age of 59. She had been trying to have children since her marriage at age 44. After seven unsuccessful pregnancies she decided to go through IVF treatment.
1955	59 years	2014	Barbara Sienkiewicz	Poland	The Polish actress gave birth to twins, a girl named Anna and a boy named Piotr.
1890	59 years	29 January 1949	Inez Turley	United States	Mrs. Fred. J. Turley, 59, Wife of a 65-year-old Helena, Ark. Barber says the birth of her sixth child was "An answer to a prayer." Their other children are dead. Two died in the war. Dr. Eva Dodge of the University of Arkansas medical school termed Mrs. Turley's case "Very Unusual." The mother will be 60 in April 1949.
1940	58 years, 6 months	1998	Lin Fu-mei	Republic of China	Lin Fu-mei, of Republic of China (Taiwan), whose age was reported between 58 and 59, gave birth to twin daughters in 1998.
1949	58 years, 5 months	December 2007	Türkan Katicelik	Germany	Türkan Katicelik, a Turkish woman living in Aschaffenburg, Germany, gave birth to a daughter, Karya, in December 2007. The child weighed 2.1 kg, was 46 cm tall and was delivered by caesarean section. She had had several miscarriages before she gave birth to her first child. She used IVF with an anonymous 25-year-old donor's oocytes. In 2008, she announced she was a bit younger than had previously been reported, because of a mistake in the official registration. She would be 60 in July 2009, meaning she had been about 58 1/2 at the birth.
11 August 1946	58 years, 4 months	December 2004	Lauren Cohen	United States	Lauren Cohen of Paramus, New Jersey, born on 11 August 1946, already mother of a 26-year-old daughter, Renee, of her first marriage, gave birth to a daughter, Raquel, in New York City, in December 2004, at the age of 58 years and 4 months. Lauren Cohen and her husband, Frank Garcia, will still have twins together through IVF in May 2006, using the husband's sperm and oocytes from a donor. The couple, faced with either donating the embryos left over from the first IVF treatment or letting them be destroyed, decided to try again. As to why she chose to have children at such a late age, with a husband approximately 20 years her junior, Lauren Cohen stated, "I just thought it would be unfair to Frank for him to marry me and never have the opportunity to have a child. He never asked me to have a child, but I knew it would make him happy".
1760	58 years	24 December 1818	Mrs George Saunders	United Kingdom	The Royal Cornwall Gazette of 2 January 1819, reporting the birth of twins, on previous Christmas Eve (24 December 1818), to Mrs George Saunders, wife of a London shoemaker, in her 59th year of age. Her last previous child had been born 35 years before that.
1937	58 years	1995	Emilia Bacco	Italy	Emilia Bacco, 58-year-old Italian woman from Salerno, Italy, gave birth to twin boys in 1995, after IVF treatment with oocytes donation fertilized by her husband's sperm.
1943	58 years	June 2001	"Pragna"	India	"Pragna", a 58-year-old Indian woman, from Mumbai, Maharashtra, gave birth to a son, by Caesarean section, in June 2001.
1944	58 years	September 2002	Janet Bosher	United Kingdom	Janet Bosher gave birth to her twins children Sarah and James in London in September 2002, at the age of 58, after IVF treatment with donated embryos, her partner Martin Maslin, also apparently sterile, at the Professor Ian Craft's private clinic. In January 2003, Martin Maslin died from a heart attack at age 64, four months after the twins' birth. After his death the wisdom of a couple close to retirement age having fertility treatment was debated.
1945	58 years	8 March 2003	Samira Ellis	Sweden	Samira Ellis, an Israeli native, gave birth to twins, boy, Elias, and girl, Solva, in Sweden on 8 March 2003, at the age of 58.
1948	58 years	1 December 2006	Ann Stopler	United States	Ann Stolper, of Delray Beach, Florida, gave birth to her own twin granddaughters, Itai & Maya, in USA on 1 December 2006, at the age of 58, acting as a surrogate mother for her daughter Caryn Stopler Chomsky and her husband Ayal Chomsky. Caryn Chomsky had had a hysterectomy at age 25 as she had been diagnosed with cervical cancer and was not able to have children the traditional way.
1952	58 years	December 2010	Carole Hobson	United Kingdom	Carole Hobson of Kent, South East England, gave birth to twins, a boy and a girl, in December 2010, at the age of 58, following IVF treatment at a clinic in India.
1954	58 years	9 May 2012	Maria Addolorata Montuori	Italy	Maria Addolorata Montuori, a 58-year-old woman from Boscoreale, near Naples, Campania, Italia, gave birth to triplets, one girl, Giovanna, and two boys, Alessandro and Adriano, on 9 May 2012, at the General Hospital of aples, after post-menopausal IVF treatment, with oocytes donation fertilized by sperm of her husband, Salvatore Manzo, 59 years.
11 June 1899	57 years, 4 months, 7 days	18 October 1956	Ruth Alice Kistler	United States	Ruth Alice Kistler of Portland, Oregon, gave birth to a daughter, Susan, in Los Angeles, California, on 18 October 1956, at the age of 57 years and 129 days. The birth predated the advent of in vitro fertilization making Kistler one of the oldest women known to have conceived naturally. Born on 11 June 1899, she died in 1982, at the age of 82 or 83, while her daughter was 25 or 26.
July 1915	57 years, 4 months (also 52 and 55 years)	24 November 1972	Anna Martin	United States	Anna Martin, of Broken Arrow, near Tulsa, Oklahoma, already mother of six children, the eldest, Louis, was then 25, gave birth by Caesarean section to a daughter, Mary-Jane, on 24 November 1972, at the age of 57 years and 4 months. She already had her previous children, a daughter, in summer 1967, at the age of 52, then a son, Donnie-Ray, in summer 1970, at the age of 55.
1939	57 years	14 March 1996	Natalya Surkova	Russia	Natalya Surkova became the oldest mother in Russia after giving birth to her daughter Sasha on 14 March 1996, at the age of 57. She became pregnant after one-and-a-half years of hormonal treatment, having been established in premenopausal. Surkova, a divorced mother of two adult children, decided to have one more child because her new partner was childless.
1941	57 years	12 December 1998	Judith Cates	United States	Judith Cates of Evansville, Indiana gave birth to twin girls, Margaret Jan Marie (Maggi) and Carli Sue Morgan (Carli), on 12 December 1998, at the age of 57. She got pregnant after IVF treatment, and she has said that she and her husband, Carl, are often mistaken for grandparents.
1948	57 years	20 April 2005	Rosie Swain	United States	Rosie Swain naturally gave birth to twins, girl and boy, Diana and Christian, in USA on 20 April 2005, at the age of 57. Swain and her husband Jay, who already were six times grandparents and four times great-grandparents, by her six eldests, decided to go through IVF in order to give their last child, 6-year-old son Jimmy, a sibling close in age.
1951	57 years	28 March 2008	Susan Tollefsen	United Kingdom}	Susan Tollefsen, a Norway-born Englishwoman, of Laindon, Essex, England, gave birth to her first child, daughter Freya, on 28 March 2008, at the age of 57, after IVF treatment with oocytes donation. She was refused to be treated in Britain because of her age, so she went to Russia and Poland to receive IVF. Two years later she desired another child, was accepted at London Women's Clinic, and became the oldest woman in Britain to be offered this kind of treatment, but later she decided not to risk her health.
1951	57 years	13 July 2008	"Vera"	Ukraine	57-year-old woman gave birth to a son, Andrei, in Kyiv, Ukraine by Caesarean section on 13 June 2008, at the age of 57. Her first son died at age 20, later she gave birth to twin boys, but they died after 10 days, so she and her husband decided to try once again.
1953	57 years	August 2010	Pamela Butler	United Kingdom	57-year-old Pamela Butler, of Blackwood, Wales, gave birth to a boy, Josef, in August 2010 via surrogacy. Her 35-year-old daughter, Nichola, had tried to have a baby on her own and failed. Pamela Butler became Britain's oldest surrogate mother.
1954	57 years	September 2011	Silvana Sofia	Italy	Silvana Sofia, 57-year-old woman doctor, gave birth to female twins, Karola Pia and Adriana Cristina, in Salerno, Italy in September 2011. Her husband was 70 years old at that time.
12 November 1946	56 years, 11 months, 27 days	9 November 2004	Aleta St. James	United States	Aleta St. James, born on 12 November 1947, gave birth to twins, a boy and a girl, Francesca and Gian, at Mount Sinai Hospital in New York City, on 9 November 2004, just three days before her 57th birthday, after having undergone IVF treatment using donor eggs.
1968	56 years	10 March 2024	Rachel Danieli	Israel	After having kids with and losing her first husband, she married Rabbi Tzvi Kushlevsky (a widower). The couple welcomed their child together on 10 March 2024 when she was 56 and he was 88.
1955	56 years	24 May 2001	Lynn Bezant	United Kingdom	Lynn Bezant of Croughton, Northamptonshire gave birth to twins, girl and boy, Susan and David, by Caesarean section, on 24 May 2001, at the age of 56, after receiving fertility treatment. Bezant, who already had three adult children with her husband Derek, received donor eggs which had been fertilised with her husband's sperm. The couple had always wanted a larger family but had failed after Bezant gave birth to stillborn twins and then suffered a miscarriage.
1952	56 years	10 January 2008	Raisa Akhmadeeva	Russia	Raisa Akhmadeeva gave birth to her first child, a boy, in Ulyanovsk, Russia on 10 January 2008, at the age of 56. Her husband Rachid has already three children from his previous marriage, but they always wanted to have a child together.
1952	56 years	11 October 2008	Jacilyn Dalenberg	United States	Jacilyn Dalenberg (née Wooster) of Mansfield, Ashland, Ohio, gave birth to her own triplet granddaughters, Elisabeth Jacilyn, and twins Carmina Ann and Gabriella Claire, on 11 October 2008, at the age of 56, acting as a surrogate mother for her daughter Kim Wooster Coseno and her husband Joe Coseno. Already mother of two children, a girl, Brittni (Wilkinson) and a boy, Colin (Anderson), of her two previous companions, Kim Wooster became sterile after giving birth to her son.
1954	56 years	26 May 2010	Gabriella De Ambrosis	Italy	Gabriella De Ambrosis gave birth to her first child, daughter Viola, on 26 May 2010, in Italy, at the age of 56, after IVF treatment abroad. Gabriella married her husband Luigi in 1990. They tried for many years to conceive naturally, and also had two requests for adoption turned down. In September 2011, an Italian court has ordered their daughter to be taken into care after ruling that librarian Gabriella, 57, and her retired husband, 70, were too old.
14 June 1954	56 years, 4 months, 12 days	26 November 2010	Gianna Nannini	Italy	On 26 November 2010, 56-year-old Italian singer Gianna Nannini gave birth to her first child, a girl named Penelope, having conceived naturally following fertility treatments.
1958	56 years	27 December 2014	Lisa Swinton McLaughlin	United States	Lisa Swinton McLaughlin, the medical director for the American Red Cross in Baltimore, gave birth to premature twin boys on 27 December 2014, at the age of 56, after more than 10 years of fertility treatment attempts. She was discharged from hospital on 31 December, but was still suffering from the stomach pain, and died at home of a bowel obstruction on 4 January 2015, while her sons were still in the hospital.
1962	56 years	26 February 2018	Irina Vitorgan	Russia	Irina Vitorgan, third wife of Russian actor Emmanuil Vitorgan, gave birth to a baby girl named Ethel on 26 February 2018, at the age of 56, after IVF treatment.
23 December 1966	56 years, 1 months, 19 days	11 February 2023	Cláudia Raia	Brazil	Cláudia Raia, Brazilian actress, already mother of a daughter and a son from her 2nd husband Edson Celulari, gave birth on 11 February 2023, to her third child with her third husband, actor and host Jarbas Homem de Mello, 53, with her frozen oocytes.
March 1943	55 years, 11 months (also 51 years)	22 March 1999	Pauline Lyon	United Kingdom	Pauline Lyon, born in late March 1943, gave birth to a son, Brodie, at Hinchingbrooke Hospital, Huntingdon, Cambridgeshire, England, on 22 March 1999, at the age of 55 years and 11 months, after IVF treatment. She had also given birth to a girl at age 51 after the same treatment, and Lyon and her second husband wanted their daughter to have a sibling. Lyon also had an adult daughter from her first marriage.
21 April 1932	55 years, 4 months, 19 days	9 September 1987	Kathleen Campbell	United Kingdom	Kathleen Campbell of Kimberley, Nottinghamshire, England, born on 21 April 1932, and already grandmother by one of her six elder children ages 16 to 22, gave birth by Caesarean section to her 7th child, a 6 lb 7 oz (2.92 kg) son named Isaac Joby, on 9 September 1987, at the age of 55 years and 141 days, having conceived naturally.
7 January 1876	55 years, 2 months, 10 days	17 March 1931	Mary Higgins	Ireland	Mrs Mary Higgins of Cork City, Ireland, born on 7 January 1876, gave birth to her first child when she was 55 years and 69 days old, on 17 March 1931, St. Patrick's Day, Irish National Day. The case was reported on 5 July 1932.
1881	55 years, 3 days	1936	Winifred Wilson	United Kingdom	Winifred Wilson, from Eccles, west of Manchester, England, who gave birth to her 10th child at the age of 55 years and 3 days in 1936, was the oldest British mother until September 1987, when Kathleen Campbell, from Nottingham, England, gave birth at 55 years and 141 days.
1933	55 years	18 April 1998	Merryl Fudel	United States	Merryl Fudel, a five-time divorcee from San Diego, gave birth to quadruplets, three girls and a boy, on 18 April 1998, at the age of 55, after IVF treatment. She is probably the oldest woman who gave birth to quadruplets. Three girls and one boy were born at 27 weeks, the smallest of them weighted only 10 oz at birth. One of the girls died eight days later. Fudel surrendered two other girls for adoption, so only the boy remained with mother.
1945	55 years	February 22, 2000	Marilyn McReavy Nolen	United States	Marilyn Nolen (born McReavy), former Olympic athlete and volleyball coach at St. Louis University, gave birth to twin sons, Travis and Ryan, on 22 February 2000, at the age of 55. She married her husband Randy Nolen in 1988, and since that were trying to have a child, and after 10 years with no success they decided in 1998 to go through IVF.
1949	55 years	December 2004	Tina Cade	United States	Tina Cade, from Virginia, gave birth to her own triplet grandchildren, two boys, Aaron and Kai, and a girl, Simone, in December 2004, at the age of 55, acting as a surrogate mother for her 29-year-old daughter Camille Hammond and her husband Jason. Camille suffers from endometriosis and had tried six attempts of IVF, but had been unsuccessful each time, and then Ms. Cade has offered her help.
1952	55 years	July 2007	Veronica Mensah	United States	Veronica Mensah of Lithonia, Georgia, gave birth to twins, boy and girl, Daniel Atsu and Diana Atsupui, in July 2007, at the age of 55. The children are named Dikenou after their genitor. She had been trying to have children since she was 25, and after 30 years she decided to try through IVF, which was done in her native Ghana.
1952	55 years	27 August 2007	"Brinda"	India	Indian woman named Brinda from Bhadravathi, Karnataka, gave birth to twin sons, Akash and Rishikesh, on 27 August 2007, in Chennai, at the age of 55. She and her husband Alagappan were childless for 28 years because of Alagappan's oligospermia, so they decided to go through IVF with donated oocytes and intracytoplasmic sperm injection (ICSI).
1961	55 years	March 2016	Sharon Cutts	United Kingdom	Sharon Cutts of Lincolnshire, England, already a mother of 4, gave birth to triplets, sons Mason and Ryan and daughter Lily, in March 2016, at the age of 55, after undergoing IVF treatment in Cyprus.
1962	55 years	September 2017	Muazzez Çınar	Turkey	Muazzez Çınar of Uşak, Turkey, gave birth to twin boys in September 2017, at the age of 55, after IVF treatment. They named one of the boys after their son, Hüseyin, who drowned in the sea in northern Rize.
1964	55 years	16 January 2019	Emma Miles	United Kingdom	Emma Miles gave birth to her granddaughter Evie on 16 January 2019, at the age of 55, acting as a surrogate mother for her 31-year-old daughter Tracey Smith, who was born without a womb, and her husband Adam Smith.
May 1793	54 years, 11 months	30 April 1847	Barbara Christman	United States	Barbara "Barbary" Christman (née Klientop) of Pennsylvania, gave birth 3 days before her 55th birthday, to William Christman on 30 April 1847. Her husband, Daniel Christman of Chestnut Hill, Pennsylvania was 62. William was the seventh of Daniel and Barbara's seven children.
March 1944	54 years, 10 months	January 2000	Aracelia Garcia	United States	Aracelia Garcia of Sunnyside, Washington, astounded doctors when she naturally conceived (without hormonal treatment) all-female triplets in 1999 at the age of 54. She delivered by Caesarean section in early January 2000 three healthy girls, named Arianna, Brianna and Cecelia, to play on initials A, B, C.
January 1862	54 years, 1 month	10 February 1916	Elizabeth Pearce	United Kingdom	Mrs Elizabeth Pearce of Biterne, Southampton, England, gave birth to her youngest child on 10 February 1916, when she was 54 years and 40 days old.
1946	54 years	2000	Galina Shevchenko	Russia	Galina Shevchenko gave birth to twin sons in Russia in 2000 at the age of 54. Shevchenko and her husband decided to go through fertility treatment after accidental death of their only son. It was the first case of successful case of IVF treatment of a post-menopausal woman in Russia.
1947	54 years	2001	Viven Morris	United Kingdom	Vivien Morris gave birth to her granddaughter Maisie in 2001, at the age of 54, acting as a surrogate mother for her 29-year-old daughter Laura Westrop, who was unable to carry a baby after cancer treatment, and her husband Mark.
1956	54 years	July 2010	Karen Johnston	United Kingdom	Karen Johnston of Bicester, England, gave birth to twins, a boy, Asa, and a girl, Imogen, in July 2010, at the age of 54, after undergoing IVF treatment in Czech Republic. She was already a mother of eight, always alternating boy and girl also—Daniel, Jemma, Scott, Amy, Aiden, Bethany, Joseph and Willow. Her eighth child was born in June 2008 also after IVF treatment in the same Czech clinic.
1956	54 years	11 October 2010	Giovanna Ciardi	Italy	Giovanna Ciardi of Camaiore, Province of Lucca, already mother of two, gave birth to her third child, a daughter, named Adria, on 11 October 2010, at the age of 54, after a natural conception.
1957	54 years	15 August 2011	Solange Couto dos Santos	Brazil	Brazilian actress Solange Couto dos Santos, already mother of a son, Márcio Felipe, and a daughter, Morena Mariah, of her previous marriage, gave birth to her third child, a son, named Benjamin, on 15 August 2011, at the age of 54, after a natural conception.
15 July 1963	54 years, 11 months, 7 days	22 June 2018	Brigitte Nielsen	Denmark	Brigitte Nielsen gave birth to her fifth child in June 2018 at the age of 54. The model-actress had her eggs frozen around age 40. She and her fifth husband, Mattia Dessi, were finally successful after trying with IVF for 14 years.
1761	53 years	1814	Alida Armstrong	United States	Alida Armstrong, wife of then-United States Secretary of War Robert Armstrong, was delivered of her seventh and last child William a full 13 years after the birth of her last previous child.
1939	53 years	10 November 1992	Mary Shearing	United States	Mary Shearing, a 53-year-old Californian woman, former amateur body builder, became pregnant with the help of medical technology in New York City, after marrying 7 years earlier Don Shearing, a 21 years younger man. She gave birth on 10 November 1992, to about 12 weeks premature twin girls, at Martin Luther Hospital. The first baby, Amy Leigh, born naturally, was 2 lb 2 oz (0.96 kg). Her sister, Kelly Ann, born by Caesarean section, weighed 2 lb 12.5 oz (1.26 kg).
1939	53 years	28 December 1992	Geraldine Wesolowski	United States	Geraldine Wesolowski of New York City, gave birth to her own grandson Matthew on 28 December 1992, at the age of 53, after IVF treatment in Christian Fertility Institute in Easton, Pennsylvania, in order to act as a gestational surrogate for her 31-year-old son Mark Wesolowski and his 32-year-old wife, Susan Cooper Wesolowski, who had undergone hysterectomy at age 21 and could no longer bear children after the birth of her first son, who died at 2. It was believed that Geraldine Wesolowski, who was post-menopausal, was then the oldest woman in the United States to give birth through IVF. That led to appearances on the Oprah Winfrey and Montel Williams television shows, according to Dr. Ida M. Campagna, the Amherst-based obstetrician who delivered Matthew. Matthew died in February 2010 of injuries sustained in a car accident.
1952	53 years	September 2005	Annie Casserley	United Kingdom	Annie Casserley gave birth to her own granddaughter Annie Trinity Hattersley in the United Kingdom in September 2005, at the age of 53, after choosing to act as a gestational surrogate for her 35-year-old daughter, Emma Hattersley, who has a rare cancer-like condition, Histiocytosis X, making her unable to withstand pregnancy.
1955	53 years	June 2008	Sarajean Grainson	United States	Sarajean Grainson of Long Island, New York, gave birth to twin sons, Matthew and David, in June 2008 at the age of 53, after IVF treatment with oocytes donation. Grainson and her second husband David, former priest, already had a son Luke in December 2006. Sarajean Grainson also had three adult children from her first marriage.
1953	53 years	December 2008	Adele Dramis	Italy	Adele Dramis, an Italian woman of Greek origin, gave birth to twins, a boy, Vicenzo, and a girl, Rosa, in Naples, Italy, in late December 2008, at the age of 53. She had been trying to get pregnant since she got married at age 45, and after years of trying she decided to receive IVF treatment.
1958	53 years	4 June 2011	Anna Fehér	Hungary	Hungarian actress Anna Fehér gave birth to her first child, a son, László Barnabás, on 4 June 2011, at the age of 53. She has been trying to conceive for ten years.
1958	53 years	4 June 2011	Debbie Hughes	United Kingdom	Debbie Hughes of Daventry, gave birth naturally to her son Kyle at Northampton General Hospital in June 2011 at the age of 53, after a natural conception. She had no plans to become a mother again when she became pregnant, as she had been taking contraceptive pills.
13 February 1705	52 years, 4 months, 29 days	11 June 1757	Julienne Despeignes Blouin	France	Julienne Despeignes wife Blouin, French woman from Ercé-en-Lamée, in Brittany, 35 km south Rennes, France, born on 13 February 1705, gave birth to her last daughter, Magdelaine, on 11 June 1757, at the age of 52 years and almost 4 months, after conceiving naturally with her husband Pierre. Mrs. Blouin born Despeignes had already had 12 children, of which, at 44 years, in February 1749, before having two others, at 45 and 49 years, two twins of opposite sex, as she herself had a twin brother.
1947	52 years	November 1999	Helen Schermerhorn Morris	United States	Helen Morris was 52 when she gave birth to her daughter Francesca Scorsese in November 1999.
2 October 1949	52 years	October 2001	Annie Leibovitz	United States	American portrait photographer Annie Leibovitz was 52 when she gave birth to her daughter Sarah in October 2001.
1951	52 years	28 August 2003	Lyudmila Belyavskaya	Russia	Lyudmila Belyavskaya, second wife of Russian actor Aleksandr Belyavsky, gave birth to her first child, daughter Alexandra, in Moscow, Russia, on 28 August 2003, at the age of 52, after a natural conception.
27 October 1952	52 years, 2 months	December 2004	Hazell Dean	United Kingdom	Her daughter was born in December 2004
1956	52 years	June 2008	Karen Johnston	United Kingdom	Karen Johnston of Bicester, England, gave birth to a girl, Willow, in June 2008, at the age of 52, after undergoing IVF treatment in Czech Republic. She was already a mother of seven, always alternating boy and girl also—Daniel (33), Jemma (28), Scott (27), Amy (26), Aiden (17), Bethany (14), Joseph (13), and had a set of twins—Imogen and Asa—in July 2010 also after IVF treatment in the same Czech clinic.
1959	52 years	10 January 2011	Catherine Colonges	France	Catherine Colonges, French woman from Togo, of Limogne-en-Quercy, Lot, France, gave birth to triplets, a girl Léonore, and two boys, Elian and Alexis, in Toulouse, France, at the age of 52, after conceiving naturally with her husband Alain. Mrs Colonges already has a 30-year-old and a 27-year-old son, a 15-year-old daughter and three grandchildren.
1960	52 years	5 October 2012	Shakuntala Devi	India	Shakuntala Devi from India gave birth to her second son at the age of 52, after conceiving naturally with her husband Ramjit Raghav, aged 96. She gave birth to her first child in 2010 at the age of 50.
1967	52 years	8 July 2019	Lilian Chan Lai-lai	Hong Kong	
7 December 1770	51 years, 20 days	27 December 1822	Princess Maria Christina of Saxony	France	Her first husband was the Prince of Carignano, who died in 1800. Through this marriage she had two children and was the grandmother of the first king of Italy. Started relationship with second husband in 1806 and had two children. She married him in 1810 and had another child in 1814 before having her only daughter from this union in December 1822.
1937	51 years	1988	Irina	Russia	Irina had an accident at the age of 25 and was told by the doctors that she was unable to have children. Later she married, and after many years of marriage eventually became pregnant and gave birth to her only son at the age of 51 in 1988.
1940	51 years	1991	Edith Jones	United Kingdom	Edith Jones gave birth to her granddaughter in 1991, at the age of 51, acting as a surrogate mother for her daughter Suzanne Langston, who was born without a womb.
11 June 1946	51 years, 8 months, 6 days	17 March 1997	Adrienne Barbeau	United States	American actress Adrienne Barbeau gave birth to twin sons, Walker Steven and William Dalton, on 17 March 1997, at the age of 51. After marrying Billy Van Zandt in 1992 she started trying to have a child, tried IVF unsuccessfully, but later became pregnant naturally.
1944	51 years	7 July 1995	Bodo woman	India	Limca World book of records 1999 – A 51-year-old woman gave birth to a 1.9 kg test tube baby on 7 July 1995, at the Institute of Human Reproduction. She was treated by Dr M.L. Goenka. Dr M.L. Goenka is the founder of IHR Gwuhatai, IHR Kolkata and IHR Siliguri.
3 July 1949	51 years	2000	Elizabeth Edwards	United States	Elizabeth Edwards, wife of the former U.S. Senator and Vice Presidential nominee John Edwards, gave birth to son Jack in 2000 at the age of 51. The couple decided to have more children after one of their two children—a 16-year-old son—was killed in a car accident in 1996. Mrs. Edwards had also had a daughter, Emma Claire, at the age of 49. Some fertility experts believe she used a donor's oocytes; Elizabeth Edwards remained silent on this question.
1969	51 years	November 2020	Julie Loving	United States	Julie Loving decided to step in and become a gestational surrogate for her daughter Breanna Lockwood, who is infertile.
1950	51 years	1 August 2001	Morgan Zantua	United States	Morgan Zantua, of Tacoma, Washington, gave birth to her first child, daughter Auriel, on 1 August 2001, in Los Angeles, at the age of 51. She was married a second time at age 44, had a miscarriage and decided not to try to have children, and then unexpectedly found out she was pregnant at age 51.
1955	51 years	December 2006	Sarajean Grainson	United States	Sarajean Grainson of Long Island, New York, gave birth to a son, Luke, in December 2006 at the age of 51, after IVF treatment with oocytes donation. Grainson and her second husband David, former priest, had twins, Matthew and David, in June 2008. Sarajean Grainson also had three adult children from her first marriage.
1956	51 years	28 September 2007	Rosinete Palmeira Serrão	Brazil	Rosinete Palmeira Serrão gave birth to her own twin grandsons, Antonio Bento and Vitor Gabriel, at a hospital in Recife, Brazil, on 28 September 2007, at the age of 51, after choosing to act as a gestational surrogate for her 27-year-old daughter, Claudia Michelle Serrão Pereira, who had tried to become pregnant for four years. Under Brazilian law, a surrogate mother is required to be one's close relative, so Serrao volunteered because Claudia had no sisters. The children were conceived through artificial insemination using Claudia's eggs and her husband's sperm.
1958	51 years	December 2009	Anita Makhtur	India	Anita Makhtur, previously childless Indian woman, gave birth to twin boys in December 2009, at the age of 51, after IVF treatment. She was unable to get pregnant for 23 years because of fibroma uteri and had two unsuccessful attempts of IVF. She is probably the oldest woman who had IVF using her own unfrozen oocytes.
1961	51 years	31 October 2012	Naomi Gryn	United Kingdom	English writer and filmmaker Naomi Gryn, daughter of British Reform rabbi and broadcaster Hugo Gryn, gave birth to her first child, a daughter Sadie Inez Liberty Joy, at UCLH on 31 October 2012, at the age of 51, after IVF treatment.
1962	51 years	2013	Rashmi Verma	India	Mrs (Dr.) Rashmi Verma gave birth to a daughter (Lalli) in Delhi India in 2013 at the age of 51. Mrs. Rashmi Verma and her husband decided to go through fertility treatment after accidental death of their only child Amritanshu Verma.
1964	51 years	May 2015	Sebastiana Maria da Conceicao	Brazil	Sebastiana Maria da Conceicao, gave birth to her 21st child in the city of Aracaju, Brazil in May 2015, at the age of 51. The little boy joined the family of 10 brothers and 10 sisters, of whom 18 were alive. "I had my first son when I was 13, I was still a child, I didn't know much. But after, at an older age, I started to have one after the other," Sebastiana said.
1967	51 years	4 June 2018	Julia Zhabyko	Russia	Julia Zhabyko, gave birth to triplets, two sons and a daughter, in Vladivostok, Russia in June 2018, at the age of 51, after IVF treatment.
1968	51 years	December 2019	Lorraine Chan	United States	Lorraine Chan was 51 when she gave birth a son in December 2019.
18 August 1972	51 years, 10 months, 8 days	26 October 2023	Victoria Coren Mitchell	United Kingdom	British TV presenter Victoria Coren Mitchell, wife of comedian David Mitchell, gave birth to a daughter, June, on 26 October 2023. The couple also have an older child, born in 2015.
1946	50 years	July 1996	Judy Bershak	United States	Judy Bershak of Los Angeles, California, gave birth to her first child, daughter Sarah, in July 1996 at the age of 50. Bershak got married at the age of 44, and after failing in conceiving naturally and adopting, she went through in vitro fertilization (IVF) treatment with oocyte donation and became pregnant after first attempt.
1947	50 years	20 February 1997	Cheryl Fillippini	United States	Cheryl Fillippini of Lompoc, California, gave birth to quadruplets, three girls, Rebekah, Amanda, and Sydney, and a boy, Robert, on 20 February 1997, by Caesarean section, in Santa Barbara, at the age of 50, after IVF treatment. Fillippini and her husband had 10 children altogether from their previous marriages, but wanted to have a child together.
1951	50 years	3 April 2001	Tsuya Otake	United States	Tsuya Otake gave birth to a daughter, Ashima Shiraishi, who would become a world class rock climber.
1960	50 years	22 May 2010	Heather Elizabeth Parisi	Italy	Heather Elizabeth Parisi, Italian-American singer and actress, already mother of two daughters of her previous unions, Rebecca Jewel Manenti, 16, and Jacqueline Lune di Giacomo, 10, gave birth on 22 May 2010, in Vicenza, Italy, to twins, a girl and a boy, Elizabeth Jaden and Dylan Maria, naturally conceived with her 42-year-old third husband, contractor Umberto Maria Anzolin.
1960	50 years	June 2010	Svetlana Krupenik	Ukraine	Svetlana Krupenik gave birth to a girl in Kyiv, Ukraine, in June 2010, at the age of 50, after IVF treatment. She and her 62-year-old husband were trying to conceive for 30 years.
1960	50 years	August 2010	Aggie Ezekiel	Canada	Aggie Ezekiel of Edmonton, Alberta, already a mother of three adult daughters with her husband Johnny Ezekiel, gave birth in August 2010 to her own granddaughter Clare at the age of 50 years and 9 months. She chose to act as a surrogate mother for her daughter, Tinna (age 28), who happened to be born without a uterus and had one of her ovaries removed at the age of 21. Aggie had been premenopausal for two years and could not produce the child herself, so she had to take fertilization hormones such as estrogen to boost her menstrual cycles so that the matrix can accommodate two to seven eggs retrieved from her daughter and fertilized in vitro with the sperm from her daughter's partner, Wilson Brown. One of the two implanted embryos happened to appear in a lateral position in Aggie's uterus as a result of which she delivered her granddaughter through caesarean section. The girl weighed 8.69 lb (3.94 kg) and did not breathe on her own. As a result, she was placed on a ventilator machine for an hour to clear her lungs. Tinna and Wilson separated shortly before the birth of their daughter. The young biological mother decided to bring the child to Fort McMurray, 330 km north-east of Edmonton with her husband, Sean Noseworthy.
3 September 1960	50 years, 4 months	January 2011	Seiko Noda	Japan	Japanese politician Seiko Noda gave birth to a boy in Tokyo conceived through in-vitro fertilization. After years of unsuccessful fertility treatments and several miscarriages, Noda decided to receive assistance from an American egg donor.
1961	50 years	15 June 2011	Anthea Nicholas	Australia	Anthea Nicholas, from Gold Coast, Queensland, Australia, is believed to be the oldest primigravida having naturally conceived in Australia. Anthea and her husband Peter were told in 2006 that they could not have children. As a result of a medical concern, in 2010, Peter researched and developed a personal diet and health regime which enabled him to return to perfect health and subsequently corrected a sperm imperfection, which, within months of his recovery, resulted in the completely unexpected pregnancy of Anthea, while she presented then clinical signs of menopause. Anthea gave birth to her son, Nicholas Jay, on 15 June 2011.
30 January 1963	50 years, 11 months, 15 days	15 December 2013	Tina Malone	United Kingdom	English actress Tina Malone gave birth to a baby girl on 15 December 2013 at the age of 50, after IVF treatment.
16 May 1966	50 years, 7 months, 18 days	3 January 2017	Janet Jackson	United States	
1 November 1964	50 years, 4 months, 6 days	7 July 2015	Sophie B. Hawkins	United States	American singer Sophie B. Hawkins gave birth to a baby girl named Esther Ballantine Hawkins on 7 July 2015, at the age of 50, after IVF treatment.
12 March 1968	50 years, 1 month	April 2018	Tammy Duckworth	United States	American politician Tammy Duckworth gave birth to her second child, a girl named Maile, in April 2018, at the age of 50, after IVF treatment.
1968	50 years	October 2018	Tracey Britten	United Kingdom	Tracey Britten, 50, gave birth to twin girls, another baby girl and a boy via caesarean section in October 2018, after IVF treatment, becoming Britain's oldest mother of quadruplets.
1968	50 years	27 December 2018	Michele Hall	United States	Michele Hall of Golden Gate, Florida, already a mother of four, gave birth in December 2018 to a baby boy, Grayson Matthew, at the age of 50.
1971	50 years	27 October 2021	Alanna Linsmeier	United States	Alanna Linsmeier of St Paul, Minnesota gave birth to a baby boy Frank Linsmeier on 27 October 2021.

== Debate ==
Pregnancies among older women have been a subject of controversy and debate. Some argue against motherhood late in life on the basis of the health risks involved, or out of concern that an older mother might not be able to give proper care for a child as she ages, while others contend that having a child is a fundamental right and that it is commitment to a child's wellbeing, not the parents' ages, that matters.

A survey of attitudes towards pregnancy over age 50 among Australians found that 54.6% believed it was acceptable for a post-menopausal woman to have her own eggs transferred and that 37.9% believed it was acceptable for a post-menopausal woman to receive donated ova or embryos.

Governments have sometimes taken actions to regulate or restrict later-in-life childbearing. In the 1990s, France approved a bill which prohibited post-menopausal pregnancy, which the French Minister of Health at the time, Philippe Douste-Blazy, said was "... immoral as well as dangerous to the health of mother and child". In Italy, the Association of Medical Practitioners and Dentists prevented its members from providing women aged 50 and over with fertility treatment. Britain's then-Secretary of State for Health, Virginia Bottomley, stated, "Women do not have the right to have a child; the child has a right to a suitable home". However, in 2005, age restrictions on IVF in the United Kingdom were officially withdrawn.

Legal restrictions are only one of the barriers confronting women seeking IVF, as many fertility clinics and hospitals set age limits of their own.

== See also ==
- Age and female fertility
- Childlessness
- Fertility factor (demography)
- List of countries by age at first marriage
- List of oldest fathers
- List of youngest parents
- List of people with the most children
- List of multiple births
- Mother
- Pregnancy
- Sexuality in older age
- Teenage pregnancy

== General and cited references ==
- Jabcosson, B.; Ladfords, L.; Milsom, I. (2004). "Advanced maternal age and adverse perinatal outcome". Obstetrics & Gynecology. 104 (4): 727–733. doi:10.1097/01.aog.0000140682.63746.be. PMID 15458893. S2CID 8652247.
- Khashan, Ali S.; et al. (2013). "Advanced maternal age and adverse pregnancy outcome: Evidence from a large contemporary cohort". PLOS ONE. 8 (2): 1–9. Bibcode:2013PLoSO...856583K. doi:10.1371/journal.pone.0056583. PMC 3577849. PMID 23437176.
- Lorentzon, M.; et al. (2012). "Advancing maternal age is associated with lower bone mineral density in young adult male offspring". Osteoporosis International. 23 (2): 475–482. doi:10.1007/s00198-011-1558-5. PMC 3261413. PMID 21350896.
- Nilsen, A.B.; et al. (2012). "Characteristics of women who are pregnant with their first baby at an advanced age". Acta Obstetricia et Gynecologica Scandinavica. 91 (3): 353–362. doi:10.1111/j.1600-0412.2011.01335.x. PMID 22150020. S2CID 38149716.
