= Zavos (surname) =

Zavos is a surname. Notable people with the surname include:

- Panayiotis Zavos (born 1944), Cypriot-American physiologist
- Spiro Zavos (born 1937), Australasian historian, philosopher, journalist, and writer
