= Paternal age effect =

Health effects of an older father at conception

The paternal age effect is the statistical relationship between the father's age at conception and biological effects on the child. Such effects can relate to birthweight, congenital disorders, life expectancy, and psychological outcomes. A 2017 review found that while severe health effects are associated with higher paternal age, the total increase in problems caused by paternal age is low at an individual level yet statistically significant at a population level. Average paternal age at birth reached a low point between 1960 and 1980 in many countries and has been increasing since then, but has not reached historically unprecedented levels. The rise in paternal age is not seen as a major public health concern.

The genetic quality of sperm, as well as its volume and motility, may decrease with age, leading the population geneticist James F. Crow to claim that the "greatest mutational health hazard to the human genome is fertile older males".

The paternal age effect was first proposed implicitly by physician Wilhelm Weinberg in 1912 and explicitly by psychiatrist Lionel Penrose in 1955. DNA-based research started more recently, in 1998, in the context of paternity testing.

== Health effects ==
Evidence for a paternal age effect has been proposed for several conditions, diseases, and other effects. In many of these, the statistical evidence of association is weak, and the association may be related by confounding factors or behavioral differences. Conditions proposed to show correlation with paternal age include the following:

=== Single-gene disorders ===
Advanced paternal age may be associated with a higher risk for certain single-gene disorders caused by mutations of the FGFR2, FGFR3 and RET genes. These conditions are Apert syndrome, Crouzon syndrome, Pfeiffer syndrome, achondroplasia, thanatophoric dysplasia, multiple endocrine neoplasia type 2, and multiple endocrine neoplasia type 2b. The most significant effect concerns achondroplasia (a form of dwarfism), which might occur in about 1 in 1,875 children fathered by men over 50, compared to 1 in 15,000 in the general population. However, the risk for achondroplasia is still considered clinically negligible. The FGFR genes may be particularly prone to a paternal age effect due to selfish spermatogonial selection, whereby the influence of spermatogonial mutations in older men is enhanced because cells with certain mutations have a selective advantage over other cells (see § DNA mutations).

=== Pregnancy effects ===
Several studies have reported that advanced paternal age is associated with an increased risk of miscarriage. The strength of the association differs between studies. It has been suggested that these miscarriages are caused by chromosome abnormalities in the sperm of aging men. An increased risk for stillbirth has also been suggested for pregnancies fathered by men over 45.

=== Birth outcomes ===
A systematic review published in 2010 concluded that the graph of the risk of low birth weight in infants with paternal age is "saucer-shaped" (U-shaped); that is, the highest risks occur at low and at high paternal ages. Compared with a paternal age of 25–28 years as a reference group, the odds ratio for low birthweight was approximately 1.1 at a paternal age of 20 and approximately 1.2 at a paternal age of 50. There was no association of paternal age with preterm births or with small for gestational age births.

=== Mental illness ===
Schizophrenia is associated with advanced paternal age. Some studies examining autism spectrum disorder (ASD) and advanced paternal age have demonstrated an association between the two, although there also appears to be an increase with maternal age.

In one study, the risk of bipolar disorder, particularly for early-onset disease, is J-shaped, with the lowest risk for children of 20- to 24-year-old fathers, a twofold risk for younger fathers, and a threefold risk for fathers >50 years old. There is no similar relationship with maternal age. A second study also found a risk of schizophrenia in both fathers above age 50 and fathers below age 25. The risk in younger fathers was noted to affect only male children.

A 2010 study found the relationship between parental age and psychotic disorders to be stronger with maternal age than paternal age.

A 2016 review concluded that the mechanism behind the reported associations was still not clear, with evidence both for selection of individuals liable to psychiatric illness into late fatherhood and evidence for causative mutations. The mechanisms under discussion are not mutually exclusive.

A 2017 review concluded that the vast majority of studies supported a relationship between older paternal age and autism and schizophrenia but that there is less convincing and also inconsistent evidence for associations with other psychiatric illnesses.

=== Cancers ===
Paternal age may be associated with an increased risk of breast cancer, but the association is weak and there are confounding effects.

According to a 2017 review, there is consistent evidence of an increase in the incidence of childhood acute lymphoblastic leukemia with paternal age. Results for associations with other childhood cancers are more mixed (e.g. retinoblastoma) or generally negative.

=== Diabetes mellitus ===
High paternal age has been suggested as a risk factor for type 1 diabetes, but research findings are inconsistent, and a clear association has not been established.

=== Down syndrome ===
It appears that a paternal-age effect might exist concerning Down syndrome, but it is small when compared to the maternal-age effect.

=== Intelligence ===
A review in 2005 found a U-shaped relationship between paternal age and low intelligence quotients (IQs). The highest IQ was found at paternal ages of 25–29; fathers younger than 25 and older than 29 tended to have children with lower IQs. It also found that "at least a half dozen other studies ... have demonstrated significant associations between paternal age and human intelligence." A 2009 study examined children at 8 months, 4 years, and 7 years and found that higher paternal age was associated with poorer scores in almost all neurocognitive tests used but that higher maternal age was associated with better scores on the same tests; this was a reverse effect to that observed in the 2005 review, which found that maternal age began to correlate with lower intelligence at a younger age than paternal age, however two other past studies were in agreement with the 2009 study's results. An editorial accompanying the 2009 paper emphasized the importance of controlling for socioeconomic status in studies of paternal age and intelligence. A 2010 study from Spain also found an association between advanced paternal age and intellectual disability.

On the other hand, later research concluded that previously reported negative associations might be explained by confounding factors, especially parental intelligence and education. A re-analysis of the 2009 study found that the paternal age effect could be explained by adjusting for maternal education and number of siblings. A 2012 Scottish study found no significant association between paternal age and intelligence, after adjusting what was initially an inverse-U association for both parental education and socioeconomic status as well as number of siblings. A 2013 study of half a million Swedish men adjusted for genetic confounding by comparing brothers and found no association between paternal age and offspring IQ. Another study from 2014 found an initially positive association between paternal age and offspring IQ that disappeared when adjusting for parental IQs.

=== Life expectancy ===
A 2008 paper found a U-shaped association between paternal age and the overall mortality rate in children (i.e., mortality rate up to age 18). Although the relative mortality rates were higher, the absolute numbers were low, because of the relatively low occurrence of genetic abnormality. The study has been criticized for not adjusting for maternal health, which could have a large effect on child mortality. The researchers also found a correlation between paternal age and offspring death by injury or poisoning, indicating the need to control for social and behavioral confounding factors.

In 2012, a study showed that greater age at paternity tends to increase telomere length in offspring for up to two generations. Since telomere length affects health and mortality, this may affect the health and aging rate of the offspring. The authors speculated that this effect may provide a mechanism by which populations have some plasticity in adapting longevity to different social and ecological contexts.

== Associated social and genetic characteristics ==
Father's age versus father's risk of death (among French population)
Father's age at birth	Risk of father's death before child's 18th birthday
20	1.5%
25	2.2%
30	3.3%
35	5.4%
40	8.3%
45	12.1%

Parents do not decide when to reproduce randomly. This implies that paternal age effects may be confounded by social and genetic predictors of reproductive timing.

A simulation study concluded that reported paternal age effects on psychiatric disorders in the epidemiological literature are too large to be explained only by mutations. They conclude that a model in which parents with a genetic liability to psychiatric illness tend to reproduce later better explains the literature.

Later age at parenthood is also associated with a more stable family environment, with older parents being less likely to divorce or change partners. Older parents also tend to occupy a higher socio-economic position and report feeling more devoted to their children and satisfied with their family. On the other hand, the risk of the father dying before the child becomes an adult increases with paternal age.

To adjust for genetic liability, some studies compare full siblings. Additionally, studies statistically adjust for some or all of these confounding factors. Using sibling comparisons or adjusting for more covariates frequently changes the direction or magnitude of paternal age effects. For example, one study drawing on Finnish census data concluded that increases in offspring mortality with paternal age could be explained completely by parental loss. On the other hand, a population-based cohort study drawing on 2.6 million records from Sweden found that risk of attention deficit hyperactivity disorder was only positively associated with paternal age when comparing siblings.

== Mechanisms ==
Several hypothesized chains of causality exist whereby increased paternal age may lead to health effects. There are different types of genome mutations, with distinct mutation mechanisms:

- DNA length mutations of repetitive DNA (such as telomeres and microsatellites), caused by cellular copying errors
- DNA point mutations, caused by cellular copying errors and also by chemical and physical insults such as radiation
- chromosome breaks and rearrangements, which can occur in the resting cell
- epigenetic changes, i.e. methylation of the DNA, which can activate or silence certain genes, and is sometimes passed down from parent to child

=== Telomere and microsatellite length ===
Telomeres are repetitive genetic sequences at both ends of each chromosome that protect the structure of the chromosome. As men age, most telomeres shorten, but sperm telomeres increase in length. The offspring of older fathers have longer telomeres in both their sperm and white blood cells. A large study showed a positive paternal, but no independent maternal age effect on telomere length. Because the study used twins, it could not compare siblings who were discordant for paternal age. It found that telomere length was 70% heritable. Regarding the mutation of microsatellite DNA, also known as short tandem repeat (STR) DNA, a survey of over 12,000 paternity-tested families shows that the microsatellite DNA mutation rate in both very young teenage fathers and in middle-aged fathers is elevated, while the mother's age has no effect.

=== DNA point mutations ===
In contrast to oogenesis, the production of sperm cells is a lifelong process. Each year after puberty, spermatogonia (precursors of the spermatozoa) divide mitotically about 23 times. By age 40, the spermatogonia will have undergone about 660 such divisions, compared to 200 at age 20. Copying errors might sometimes happen during the DNA replication preceding these cell divisions, which may lead to new (de novo) mutations in the sperm DNA.

The selfish spermatogonial selection hypothesis proposes that the influence of spermatogonial mutations in older men is further enhanced because cells with certain mutations have a selective advantage over other cells. Such an advantage would allow the mutated cells to increase in number through clonal expansion. In particular, mutations that affect the RAS pathway, which regulates spermatogonial proliferation, appear to offer a competitive advantage to spermatogonial cells, while also leading to diseases associated with paternal age.

=== DNA fragmentation ===
During the past two decades evidence has accumulated that pregnancy loss as well as reduced rate of success with assisted reproductive technologies is linked to impaired sperm chromosome integrity and DNA fragmentation. Advanced paternal age was shown to be associated with a significant increase in DNA fragmentation in a recent systematic review (where 17 out of the 19 studies considered showed such an association).

=== Epigenetic changes ===
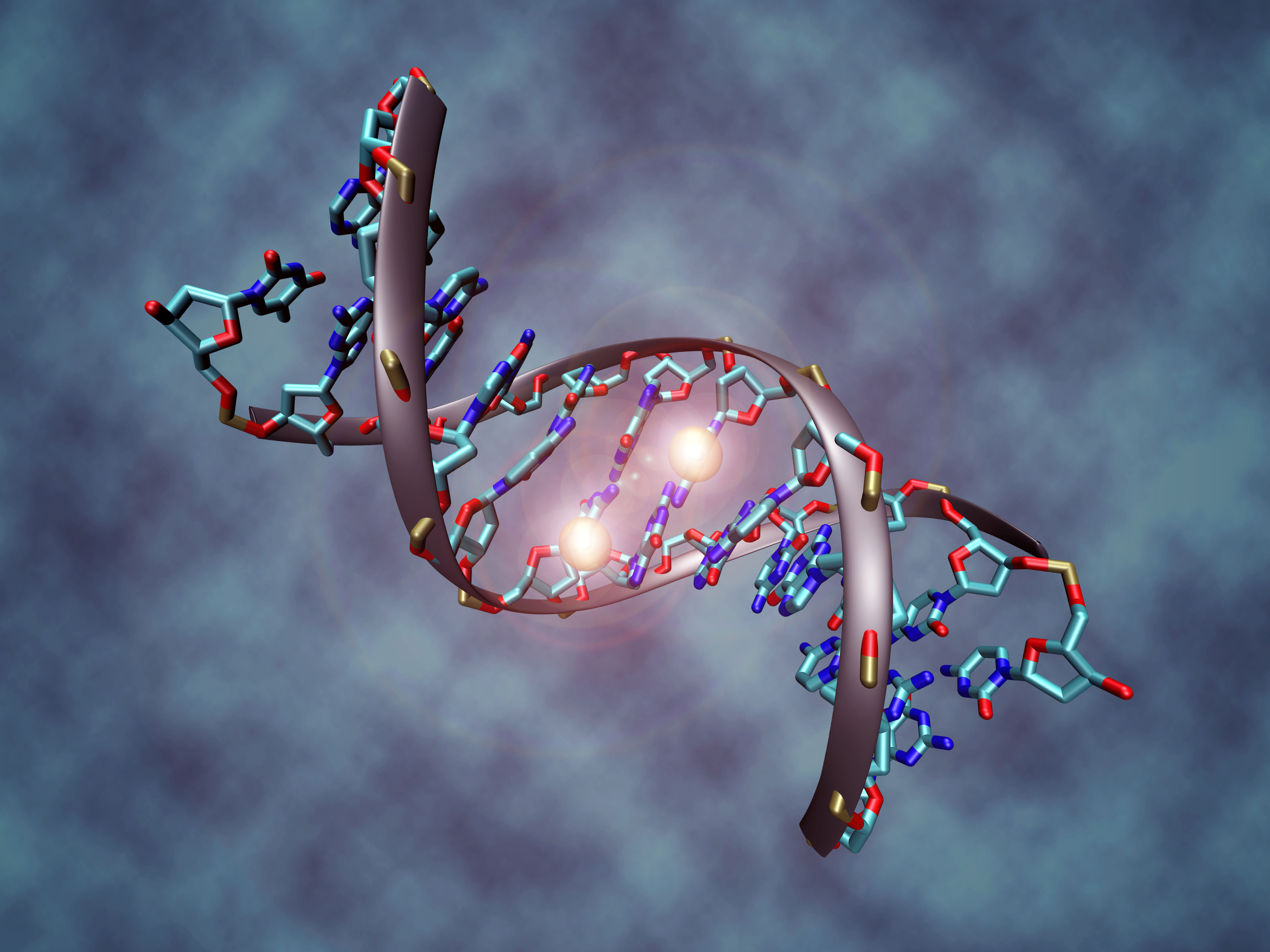
DNA methylation

The production of sperm cells involves DNA methylation, an epigenetic process that regulates the expression of genes. Improper genomic imprinting and other errors sometimes occur during this process, which can affect the expression of genes related to certain disorders, increasing the offspring's susceptibility. The frequency of these errors appears to increase with age. This could explain the association between paternal age and schizophrenia.; Paternal age affects offspring's behavior, possibly via an epigenetic mechanism recruiting a transcriptional repressor REST.

=== Semen ===
A 2001 review on variation in semen quality and fertility by male age concluded that older men had lower semen volume, lower sperm motility, a decreased percent of normal sperm, as well as decreased pregnancy rates, increased time to pregnancy, and increased infertility at a given point in time. When controlling for the age of the female partner, comparisons between men under 30 and men over 50 found relative decreases in pregnancy rates between 23% and 38%.

A 2014 review indicated that increasing male age is associated with declines in many semen traits, including semen volume and percentage motility. However, this review also found that sperm concentration did not decline as male age increased.

=== X-linked effects ===
Some classify the paternal age effect as one of two different types. One effect is directly related to advanced paternal age and autosomal mutations in the offspring. The other effect is an indirect effect related to mutations on the X chromosome which are passed to daughters who are then at risk for having sons with X-linked diseases.

== History ==
Birth defects were acknowledged in the children of older men and women even in antiquity. In book six of Plato's Republic, Socrates states that men and women should have children in the "prime of their life" which is defined as ages 25-55 for men and 20-40 for women. He states that in his proposed society men should be forbidden to father children in their fifties and that the offspring of such unions should be considered "the offspring of darkness and strange lust." He suggests appropriate punishments be administered to the offenders and their offspring.

In 1912, Wilhelm Weinberg, a German physician, was the first person to hypothesize that non-inherited cases of achondroplasia could be more common in last-born children than in children born earlier to the same set of parents. Weinberg "made no distinction between paternal age, maternal age and birth order" in his hypothesis. In 1953, Krooth used the term "paternal age effect" in the context of achondroplasia, but mistakenly thought the condition represented a maternal age effect. The paternal age effect for achondroplasia was described by Lionel Penrose in 1955. At a DNA level, the paternal age effect was first reported in 1998 in routine paternity tests.

Scientific interest in paternal age effects is relevant because the average paternal age increased in countries such as the United Kingdom, Australia and Germany, and because birth rates for fathers aged 30–54 years have risen between 1980 and 2006 in the United States. Possible reasons for the increases in average paternal age include increasing life expectancy and increasing rates of divorce and remarriage. Despite recent increases in average paternal age, however, the oldest father documented in the medical literature was born in 1840: George Isaac Hughes was 94 years old at the time of the birth of his son by his second wife, a 1935 article in the Journal of the American Medical Association stated that his fertility "has been definitely and affirmatively checked up medically," and he fathered a daughter in 1936 at age 96.

== Medical assessment ==
The American College of Medical Genetics recommends obstetric ultrasonography at 18–20 weeks gestation in cases of advanced paternal age to evaluate fetal development, but it notes that this procedure "is unlikely to detect many of the conditions of interest." They also note that there is no standard definition of advanced paternal age; it is commonly defined as age 40 or above, but the effect increases linearly with paternal age, rather than appearing at any particular age. According to a 2006 review, any adverse effects of advanced paternal age "should be weighed up against potential social advantages for children born to older fathers who are more likely to have progressed in their career and to have achieved financial security."

Geneticist James F. Crow described mutations that have a direct visible effect on the child's health and also mutations that can be latent or have minor visible effects on the child's health; many such minor or latent mutations allow the child to reproduce, but cause more serious problems for grandchildren, great-grandchildren and later generations.

== See also ==
- Maternal age effect
