= Namukwaya =

Namukwaya is a name. Notable people with the name include:

- Safina Namukwaya, oldest living woman in Africa to give birth at an old age
- Elvania Namukwaya Zirimu (1938–1979), Ugandan poet
