= Erramatti Mangamma =

Oldest woman to give birth (born 1946)

- Born: September 1, 1946 (age 80); Hyderabad, British Raj
- Known for: Currently the world's oldest mother at time of child's birth
- Spouse: Sitarama Rajarao (m. 1962; died 2020)
- Children: 2

Erramatti Mangamma is an Indian woman who currently holds the record for having given birth at the oldest age. At the age of 74, she gave birth to twin girls on 5 September 2019. The record was previously held by Daljinder Kaur Gill, who in April 2016 gave birth to a boy at the age of 72 also with the help of in vitro fertilisation.

== Pregnancy ==
Mangamma married Sitarama Rajarao in 1962 in Andhra Pradesh, but the couple were unable to have children until Mangamma was impregnated using in vitro fertilisation.

The couple is believed to have consulted several doctors for a period before they met Dr Shanakkalaya Umashankar at Ahalya nursing home who was willing to perform in vitro fertilisation. In November 2018, Mangamma became pregnant following the fertility treatment performed by Umashankar. Mangamma gave birth to her twin girls via C-section on 5 September 2019, in Hyderabad, making her the world's oldest mother and the oldest mother to give birth to twins. Some news sources initially reported her age as 73, however her doctor subsequently produced a birth certificate stating she was 74. She became a mother 57 years after her wedding in 1962.

Rajarao, her husband, died from a heart attack the following year at the age of 84 after being admitted to intensive care.

== See also ==
- Advanced maternal age
- Lina Medina
- Ramjit Raghav
