= Federal Ministry of the Interior (Germany) =

Ministry of the Interior of Germany

- Bundesministerium des Innern

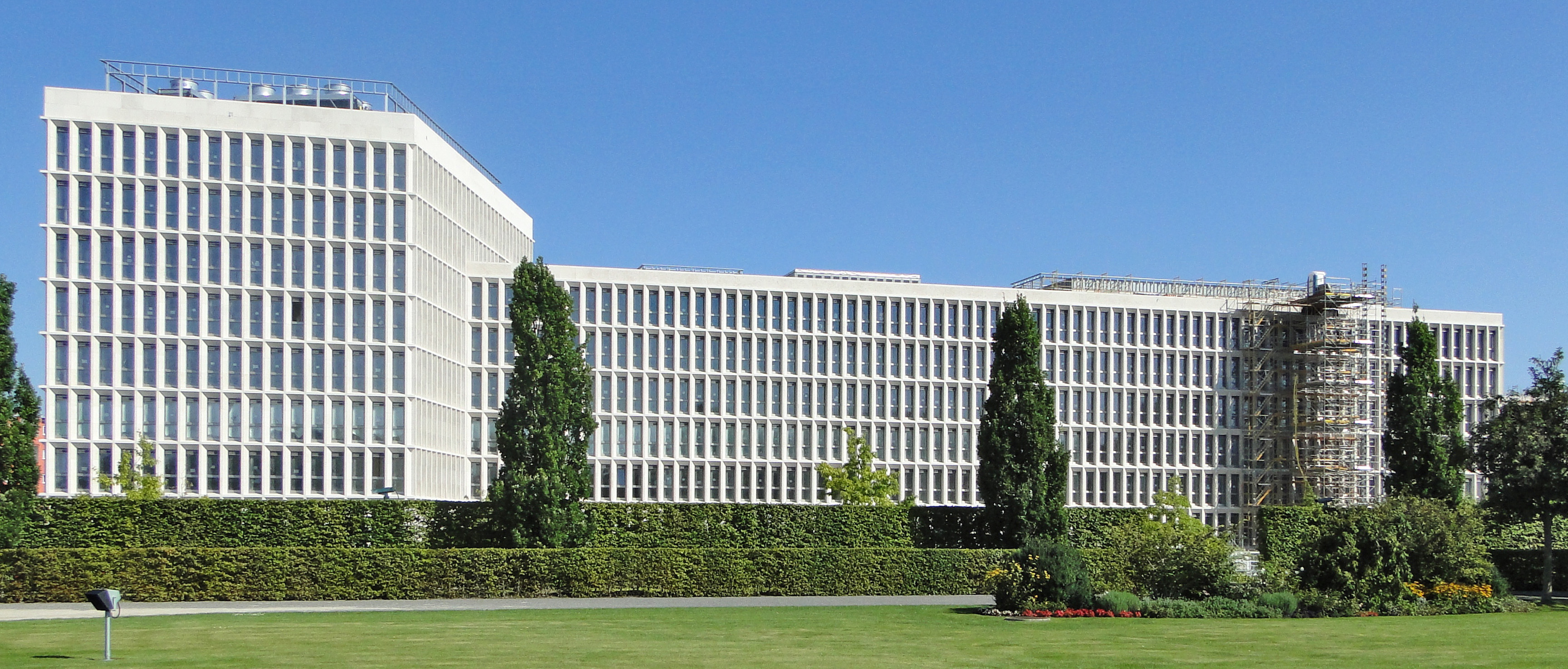

Agency overview
- Formed: 24 December 1879 (146 years ago) as the Reichsamt des Inneren; 23 May 1949 (77 years ago) in the current form
- Jurisdiction: Government of Germany
- Headquarters: Alt-Moabit 140 10557 Berlin; 52°31′17″N 13°21′44″E
- Employees: 60,000 (subordinate agencies); 1,500 (ministry)
- Annual budget: €18.458 billion (2021)
- Minister responsible: Alexander Dobrindt, Federal Minister of the Interior
- Agency executives: Christoph de Vries, Parliamentary State Secretary; Daniela Ludwig, Parliamentary State Secretary; Sarah Frühauf, Spokesperson
- Child agencies: Federal Police; Federal Office for Migration and Refugees; Federal Criminal Police Office; Federal Office for the Protection of the Constitution; Federal Office of Administration; Technisches Hilfswerk; Federal Statistical Office of Germany; Federal Office of Civil Protection and Disaster Assistance; Federal Office for Information Security; Federal Agency for Civic Education; Federal Agency for Cartography and Geodesy; Procurement Agency of the Federal Ministry of the Interior; Federal Institute of Sport Science; Federal Institute for Population Research
- Website: www.bmi.bund.de

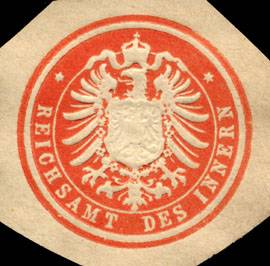
Seal of the Reichsamt des Innern

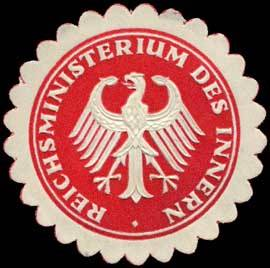
Pre-1923 Seal of the Weimar-era Reichsministerium des Innern

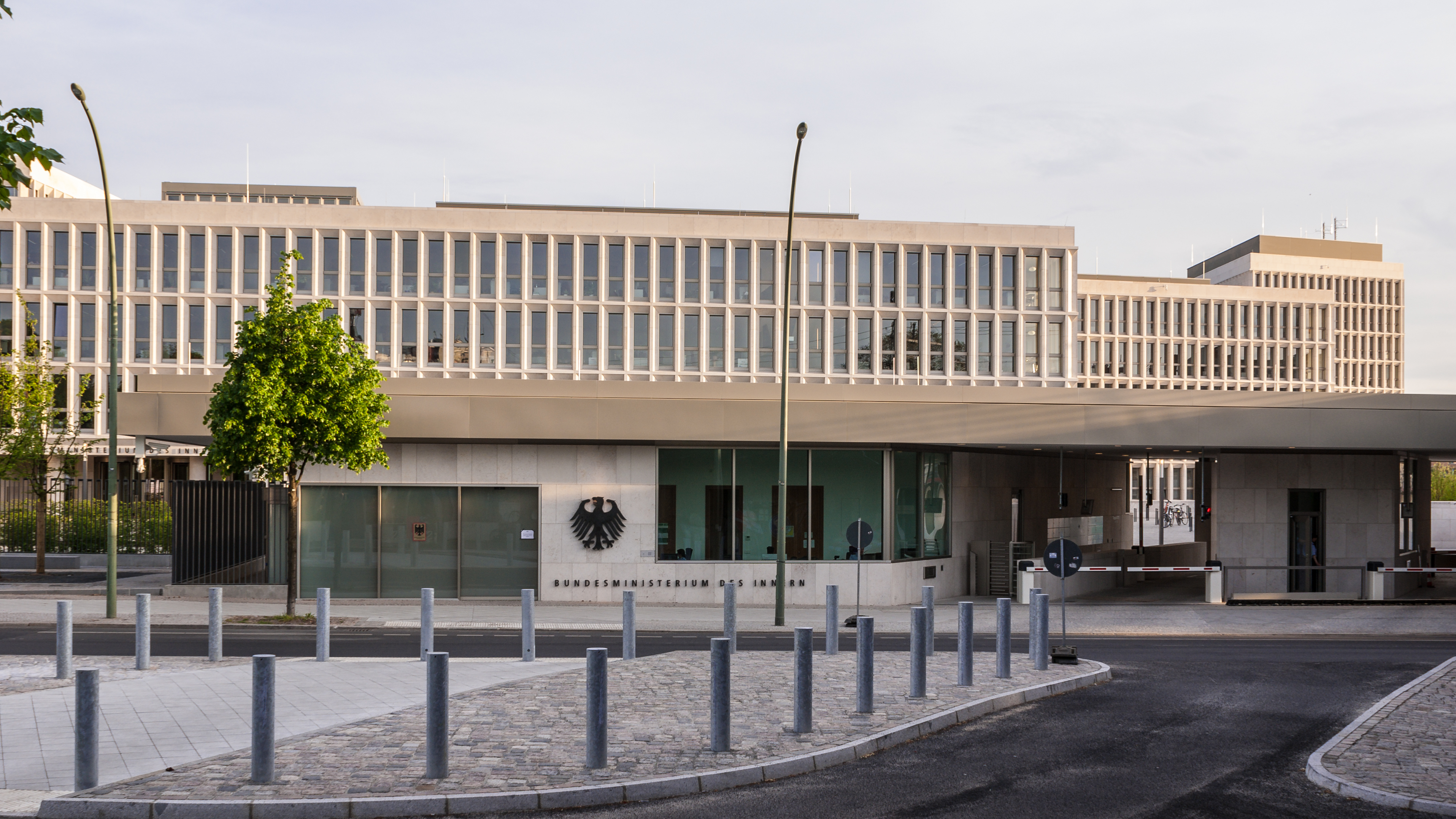
BMI in Berlin

BMI headquarters in Berlin (1999–2015)

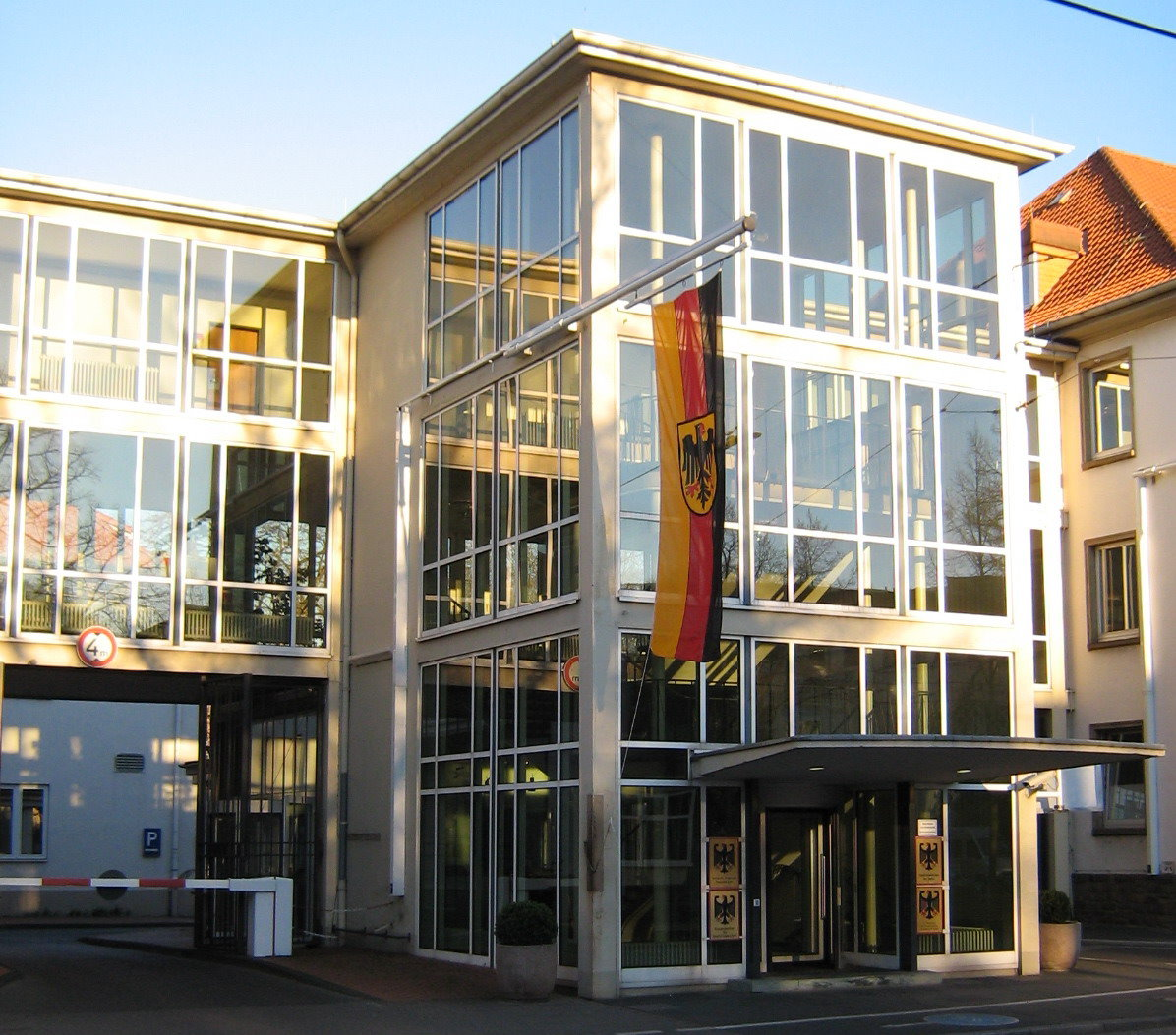
BMI in Bonn

The Federal Ministry of the Interior (German: Bundesministerium des Innern, pronounced [ˈbʊndəsminɪsˌteːʁiʊm dɛs ˈʔɪnɐn ʔʊnt fyːɐ̯ ˈhaɪmaːt]; abbreviated BMI) is a cabinet-level ministry of the Federal Republic of Germany. Its main office is in Berlin, with a secondary seat in Bonn. The current minister is Alexander Dobrindt. It is comparable to the UK Home Office or a combination of the US Department of Homeland Security and the US Department of Justice, because both manage several law enforcement agencies. The BMI is tasked with the internal security of Germany. To fulfill this responsibility it maintains, among other agencies, the two biggest federal law enforcement agencies in Germany, the Federal Police (including the GSG 9) and the Federal Criminal Police Office. It is also responsible for the federal domestic intelligence agency, the Federal Office for the Protection of the Constitution.

== History ==
The Reichsamt des Innern (Imperial Office of the Interior) was the Ministry of the Interior of the German Empire. On the proposal of the Reichskanzler Otto von Bismarck it was created on 24 December 1879 by an Imperial decree from the Reich Chancellery. Like the other Imperial Offices it was directly under the control of the Reichskanzler. The seat of the office was in Berlin and it was managed by a Secretary of State, who from 1881 until 1916 also simultaneously held the office of Vice-Chancellor. The gazette for the publication of official notices was run by the Office from 1880. Entitled the Zentralblatt für das Deutsche Reich (ZBl), it had been published by the Reich Chancellery from 1873 until 1879.

With the Law on the Provisional Imperial Government of 11 February 1919, the Imperial Office became the Reichsministerium des Innern (RMI) (Ministry of the Interior) which remained the German Ministry of the Interior during the Weimar Republic and Nazi Germany. From 1923 until 1945, the ministry published the government gazette, which was entitled the Reichsministerialblatt (RMBl). On 1 November 1934 it was united with the Prussian Ministry of the Interior as the Reichs- und Preußischen Ministerium des Innern (Imperial and Prussian Ministry of the Interior).

In 1949, the Imperial Ministry of the Interior (effectively defunct since the end of the war in Europe in 1945) was succeeded by the present Federal Ministry, though it served as the Interior Ministry for West Germany only until German reunification in 1990. From 1949 to 1970, 54% of the ministry's department leaders were former Nazi Party members, their share peaking at 66% in 1961.

Under the Fourth Merkel cabinet, which took office in February 2018, the Ministry of the Interior was merged with the building department, which had been included in the ministry of transport from 1998 to 2013, and the environment ministry from 2013 to 2018. The ministry, headed by the former Bavarian minister-president Horst Seehofer, was then renamed to "Interior, Building and Community". The renaming was controversial as some interpreted the term Heimat as old-fashioned or even nationalistic. The ministry was renamed back to "Federal Ministry of the Interior" in 2025.

== Responsibilities ==
The Ministry of the Interior is responsible for internal security and the protection of the constitutional order, for civil protection against disasters and terrorism, for displaced persons, administrative questions, and sports. It is host to the Standing Committee of Interior Ministers and also drafts all passport, identity card, firearms, and explosives legislation. The ministry also houses the Joint Anti-Terrorism Center formed in 2004 which is an information-sharing and analytical forum for all German police and intelligence agencies involved in the fight against terrorism.

== Organization ==
=== State Secretaries ===
The minister is supported by two parliamentary state secretaries and five state secretaries who manage the ministry's various departments.

=== Departments ===
state secretaries #1 and #2

- "P" Department (Abteilung P) is the ministry's police department and has two branches: law enforcement and counter-terrorism. It analyses crime control issues and develops concepts and drafts laws to improve law enforcement and crime prevention efforts. It also manages the Federal Criminal Police Office, coordinates police support group deployments and represents federal interests in the sport and security arena. Due to Germany's federal structure, it can only promote internal security and public safety by cooperating with the state police forces and with agencies within the European Union (EU) and beyond.
- "IS" Department (Abteilung IS) is the internal security department that protects the German state against political extremism. It exercises supervisory control over the Federal Office for Constitution Protection, studies extremist groups and can ban them as a final resort. In addition, the department is responsible for the security of classified information and prevention of sabotage and espionage. It also manages civil defense and emergency management efforts at the national level and exercises supervisory control over the Civil Protection Center and Federal Agency for Technical Relief.
- "B" Department (Abteilung B) supervises and manages German Federal Police operations.
- "M" Department (Abteilung M) is responsible for immigration, integration, refugees and European harmonisation.
- "Z" Department (Abteilung Z) is the central office.
- "D" Department (Abteilung D) is responsible for the civil service.
- "O" Department (Abteilung O) is responsible for administrative modernisation and organisation.
- "V" Department (Abteilung V) is responsible for constitutional, state, administrative and European law.

state secretary #3

- "G" Department (Abteilung G) is responsible for policy, Europe and international developments
- "H" Department (Abteilung H) is responsible for society affairs
- "SP" Department (Abteilung SP) is responsible for sport.

state secretary #4

- department digital society
- department digital state
- department cyber security

state secretary #5

- 2 departments on construction, housing and public buildings

=== Special agencies ===
Name	Abbrev.	Translation
Bundesausgleichsamt	BAA	Federal Equalization of Burdens Office
Bundesamt für Migration und Flüchtlinge	BAMF	Federal Office for Migration and Refugees
Bundesakademie für öffentliche Verwaltung	BAköV	Federal Academy of Public Administration
Beschaffungsamt des BMI	BeschA	Procurement Agency of the Federal Ministry of the Interior
Bundesbeauftragter für den Datenschutz und die Informationsfreiheit	BfDI	Federal Commissioner for Data Protection and Freedom of Information
Bundesamt für Verfassungsschutz	BfV	Federal Office for the Protection of the Constitution
Bundespolizei	BPOL	Federal Police
Bundesinstitut für Bevölkerungsforschung	BiB	Federal Institute for Population Research
Bundesinstitut für Sportwissenschaft	BISp	Federal Institute of Sport Science
Bundeskriminalamt	BKA	Federal Criminal Police Office
Bundesamt für Kartografie und Geodäsie	BKG	Federal Agency for Cartography and Geodesy
Bundeszentrale für politische Bildung	BpB	Federal Agency for Civic Education
Bundesamt für Sicherheit in der Informationstechnik	BSI	Federal Office for Information Security
Bundesverwaltungsamt	BVA	Federal Office of Administration
Bundesamt für Bevölkerungsschutz und Katastrophenhilfe	BBK	Federal Office of Civil Protection and Disaster Assistance
Schutzkommission beim Bundesministerium des Innern	SchK	Scientific Advisory Board on Civil Defense and Disaster Protection
Fachhochschule des Bundes für öffentliche Verwaltung	FH Bund	Federal Public Administration College
Beauftragter der Bundesregierung für Informationstechnik	KBSt	Federal Government Commissioner for Information Technology
Statistisches Bundesamt	StBA	Federal Statistical Office
Technisches Hilfswerk	THW	Federal Agency for Technical Relief
Unabhängige Kommission zur Überprüfung des Vermögens der Parteien und Massenorganisationen der DDR (defunct)	UKPV	Independent Commission for the Review of Assets of Parties and Mass Organisations of the GDR
Vertreter des Bundesinteresses beim Bundesverwaltungsgericht	VBI	Representative of the Federal Interest at the Federal Administrative Court
Beauftragter der Bundesregierung für Aussiedlerfragen und nationale Minderheiten		Federal Government Commissioner for Matters Related to Ethnic German Resettlers and National Minorities
Bundesanstalt für den Digitalfunk der Behörden und Organisationen mit Sicherheitsaufgaben	BDBOS	Federal Agency for Digital Radio of Authorities and Organisations with Security Responsibilities

== See also ==
- List of German interior ministers
