= Safina Namukwaya =

Oldest living woman in Africa to give birth

- Born: Safina Namukwaya
- Known for: Being the oldest woman in Africa to give birth, at the age of 70
- Spouse: Badru Walusimbi
- Children: 3

Safina Namukwaya is the oldest living woman in Africa to give birth at an old age. She achieved this feat on 29 November 2023 after she gave birth to twins (girl and boy) at 70 years in Uganda.

== Personal life ==
Namukwaya lives in Nunda village, Lwabenge parish, Buyiisa sub-county which is located in Kalungu district. She got married at the age of 15 in 1973. She suffered a miscarriage when her pregnancy reached 22 weeks old. After nine years, Safina was diagnosed with blocked fallopian tubes and received her treatment at Masaka Regional Referral Hospital.

Safina married Badru Walusimbi in 1996 after the death of her first husband in 1992.

== Namukwaya's in vitro fertilization and pregnancy ==
In July 2018, Namukwaya visited the Women's Hospital International and Fertility Center (WHI&FC) where was diagnosed with blocked fallopian tubes for and was given treatment. (source needs to be verified, as this conflicts with above information)

On 9 November 2019, five embryos were transferred into Namukwaya's womb and when the pregnancy test was carried out in November 2019, she had conceived through In vitro fertilization (IVF) at the first trial. She started experiencing signs of pregnancy such as morning sickness.

On 9 December 2019, the results from the ultrasound scan confirmed that Namukwaya was carrying a 6 weeks pregnancy.

On 20 March 2020, Namukwaya started attending her antenatal care when the pregnancy reached 19 weeks at Masaka Regional Referral Hospital instead of travelling to WHI&FC as it was very far.

== Giving birth ==
Namukwaya initially gave birth to a baby girl on 25 June 2020 before giving birth to twins via caesarean section at WHI&FC in Kampala on 29 November 2023 between 12:04pm and 12:05pm East African Time. The In vitro-fertilized babies were produced prematurely at a gestation period of 31 weeks and were transferred to WHI&IF's neonatal intensive care unit for incubation.

== See also ==
- Advanced maternal age
