= Ticrapo District =

Ticrapo
- District
- Interactive map of Ticrapo
- Country: Peru
- Region: Huancavelica
- Province: Castrovirreyna
- Founded: September 6, 1920
- Capital: Ticrapo

Area
  - Total: 187 km^{2} (72 sq mi)
- Elevation: 2,184 m (7,165 ft)

Population (2005 census)
  - Total: 2,004
  - Density: 10.7/km^{2} (27.8/sq mi)
- Time zone: UTC-5 (PET)
- UBIGEO: 090413

Ticrapo District is one of the 13 districts of Castrovirreyna province in Peru. Ticrapo is the birthplace of Lina Medina, the youngest confirmed mother in history.
