= Maria del Carmen Bousada de Lara =

Formerly the world's oldest mother

Carmen Bousada
- Born: María del Carmen Bousada; 5 January 1940; Cádiz, Spain
- Died: 11 July 2009 (aged 69); El Puerto de Santa María, Spain
- Known for: Oldest verified mother to give birth
- Children: Pau Bousada, Christian Bousada

María del Carmen Bousada de Lara (5 January 1940 – 11 July 2009) was a Spanish woman who gained international attention when, at the age of 66, she became the world's oldest mother on 29 or 30 December 2006, when she gave birth to twins. She later became an outspoken advocate for the rights of older mothers and a subject of considerable controversy.

== Life ==
Bousada had worked as an employee for a department store before she retired and had never married. She spent most of her life living with her mother in Cadiz before deciding to have children after her mother died in 2005. She sold her house to raise the money (equivalent to around £30,000) required to pay for IVF treatment.

== Giving birth ==
She gave birth to twin baby boys, Christian and Pau, on the 29th or the 30th of December 2006 in the Hospital de Sant Pau in Barcelona. They were delivered prematurely by caesarean section and weighed 3.5 lb (1.6 kg) each.

Bousada de Lara admitted that she had lied to physicians about her age (She had told them she was 55.) when seeking in vitro fertilization treatment at the Pacific Fertility Center in California. At the time of the delivery, Bousada was the world's oldest documented mother, surpassing the record established in 2005 by Romanian mother Adriana Iliescu, who was also 66.

Two years later, Omkari Panwar, a 70- or 72- year-old woman from the Indian state of Uttar Pradesh, gave birth to twins. However, Panwar's age is not officially documented, as she does not have a birth certificate. In November 2008, 70-year-old Rajo Devi Lohan, also from India, became the world's oldest mother.

== Death ==
Bousada died of ovarian cancer on 11 July 2009, when her sons were two and a half years old. After her death, her sons were cared for by her nephew (the son of her brother) and his wife.

== Ethical controversy ==
Critics of later-life motherhood characterized Bousada's decision to have children as "selfish, unnatural and wrong, her children innocent victims in her pernicious plan for reproductive self-gratification." Her own brothers publicly criticized her decision. Bousada herself vehemently defended her decision. In an interview in 2006, she stated "Yes, I am old of course, but if I live as long as my mum (who died at age 101), imagine, I could even have grandchildren." However, she died of cancer less than three years after giving birth.

== See also ==
- Adriana Iliescu
