= Severino Antinori =

Italian gynecologist and embryologist

Severino Antinori (born 6 September 1945 in Civitella del Tronto) is an Italian gynecologist and embryologist. He has publicly taken controversial positions over in vitro fertilisation (IVF) and human cloning. On 13 May 2016 Antinori was arrested and accused of kidnapping a woman, and stealing her ovules.

He began his career interested in veterinary biology. He studied at the University of Rome La Sapienza, graduating in 1972 with a degree in medicine. Initially he worked in gastroenterology, but following a lecture by Patrick Steptoe he re-trained in obstetrics and gynecology, moving into reproductive and infertility work from 1978. He set up his own clinic in Rome in 1982. In 1986, he pioneered the use of the ICSI (intracytoplasmic sperm injection) process in Italy. From 1989 he extended IVF to women who had passed the menopause.

In 1994 he assisted Rossana Della Corte, aged 63, in becoming pregnant. She became one of the oldest women in history to give birth.

In May 2006 it was announced that 62-year-old East Sussex child psychiatrist, Patricia Rashbrook, was seven months pregnant after being treated by Antinori, who said that 62 or 63 was the upper limit for IVF in healthy women. He commented that he would only consider couples with at least 20 years' life expectancy left for fertility treatment. Josephine Quintavalle, from Comment on Reproductive Ethics (CORE), accused Rashbrook of selfishness and said it would be extremely difficult for a child to have a mother who is as old as a grandmother.

In May 2009, after it was announced a 66-year-old woman was pregnant he criticised her decision saying that he felt she was too old and may not live long enough to raise her child.

== Human cloning ==
Antinori publicised his interest in human cloning from 1998; working with Panayiotis Zavos he argued in favour of cloning as an opportunity for infertile couples, who cannot use other methods. Genetic material from the father would be injected into an egg, which would then be implanted into the woman's womb to grow. The resulting child would, in theory, have exactly the same physical characteristics as the father.

Antinori told an Italian newspaper that more than 1,500 couples had volunteered as candidates for his research programme. In November 2002, Antinori announced that he had successfully used cloning to induce pregnancy in three women, with the birth of the first child expected in January 2003. He refused to give the identities of the women or details of where they lived, and mainstream scientists and doctors expressed scepticism about his claims.

On Thursday 25 October 2001, the BBC aired its Horizon programme in which Antinori and Zavos were the vocal proponents of human cloning. They promised they would produce the first human clones "within a year". The claim was refuted by Professor Lorraine Young of the Roslin Institute following her pioneering work with Doctor Ian Wilmut which culminated in the creation of Molly and Dolly, the worlds first cloned mammals. Young had discovered that the reason cloning was an inherently flawed technique was due to the process scrambling the positioning of DNA-associated methyl molecules which controlled the timing of DNA expression. Young warned Antinori and Zavos that they had "no understanding" of the issues and were "missing everything" with regard the fidelity of a repeatable cloning process. She further predicted that cloning was a technology that may never be successfully harnessed. Antinori and Zavos failed to heed the warnings of Professor Young and other specialists, and as of May 2020 have failed to lend credence to their claim of having been successful in cloning a viable mammalian embryo.

== Charges of egg theft ==
In 2016, Antinori was arrested on suspicion of stealing eggs by removing them from a patient's ovaries without her consent under the guise of performing a procedure on her to remove an ovarian cyst. He had recently hired a Spanish nurse at his clinic, and then diagnosed her with an ovarian cyst for the sole purpose of harvesting her eggs without her knowledge. Antinori was arrested at Fiumicino airport, charged with aggravated robbery and causing personal injury, and placed under house arrest.
