= Lina Medina =

Youngest confirmed mother in history (born 1933)

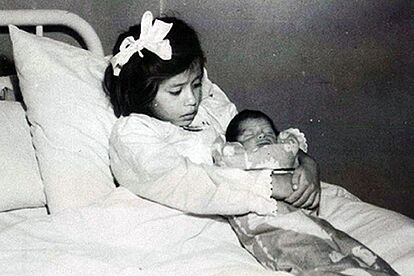
- Medina in 1939
- Born: Lina Marcela Medina Losea; 23 September 1933 (age 93); Ticrapo, Castrovirreyna, Peru
- Known for: Youngest confirmed mother in history
- Children: 2

Lina Marcela Medina de Jurado (Latin American Spanish pronunciation: [ˈlina maɾˈsela meˈðina ðe xuˈɾaðo]; née Medina Losea; born 23 September 1933) is a Peruvian woman who became the youngest confirmed mother in history when she gave birth to her son Gerardo on 14 May 1939 when she was 5 years, 7 months, and 21 days of age. Based on the medical assessments of her pregnancy, she was four years old when she became pregnant, which was biologically possible due to precocious puberty.

== Early life and development ==
Lina Medina Losea was born in 1933 in Ticrapo, Castrovirreyna Province, Peru, to parents Tiburelo Medina, a silversmith, and Victoria Losea. She was one of nine children.

Her parents took her to a hospital in Pisco at age five due to increasing abdominal size. Doctors originally thought she had a tumor but then determined that she was in her seventh month of pregnancy. Dr. Gerardo Lozada had specialists in Lima confirm the pregnancy.

There was widespread interest in the case. The San Antonio Light newspaper in Texas reported in its 16 July 1939 edition that a Peruvian obstetrician and midwife association had demanded she be admitted to a national maternity hospital, and quoted reports in the Peruvian paper La Crónica that an American film studio had sent a representative "with authority to offer the sum of $5,000 to benefit the minor" in return for filming rights, but "we know that the offer was rejected". The article noted that Lozada had made films of Medina for scientific documentation and had shown them while addressing Peru's National Academy of Medicine. Some of the films had fallen into a river on a visit to the girl's hometown, but enough remained to "intrigue the learned savants".

Six weeks after the diagnosis, on 14 May 1939, Medina gave birth to son Gerardo by caesarean section. She was 5 years, 7 months, and 21 days old, the youngest person in history to give birth. The caesarean birth was necessitated by her small pelvis. The surgery was performed by Lozada and Dr. Busalleu, with Dr. Colareta providing anaesthesia. The doctors found she had fully mature sexual organs from precocious puberty. Dr. Edmundo Escomel reported her case in the medical journal La Presse Médicale, including that her menarche had occurred at eight months of age, and the fact that she was fully regular since the age of three or two and a half.

Gerardo weighed 2.7 kg (6.0 lb; 0.43 st) at birth and was named after Medina's doctor. Gerardo was raised believing Medina to be his sister before finding out at age 10 that she was his mother. After initially remaining with the family, Lozada was allowed to take custody of Gerardo at Lozada's home in Lima. Subsequently, he employed Medina at his clinic in Lima (where she also resided), though Medina was only able to see Gerardo occasionally. Gerardo grew up healthy, but died in 1979 at the age of 40 from bone marrow disease.

== Identity of the father ==
Medina has never revealed the identity of the father nor the circumstances of her impregnation. Escomel suggests that she might not know herself, as she "couldn't give precise responses". Medina's father was arrested on suspicion of child sexual abuse but released due to lack of evidence.

== Later life ==
In young adulthood, Medina worked as a secretary in the Lima clinic of Lozada, which gave her an education and helped put her son through high school. She married and had a second son in 1972. In 2002, she refused an interview with Reuters, just as she had turned away many reporters in years past.

== Documentation ==
Although it was speculated that the case was a hoax, a number of doctors over the years have verified it based on biopsies, X-rays of the fetal skeleton in utero, and photographs taken by the doctors caring for her.

There is only one confirmed published photograph documenting the case. It was taken around the beginning of April 1939, when Medina was seven and a half months into pregnancy. Taken from her left side, the image shows her standing naked in front of a neutral backdrop.

== See also ==
- Erramatti Mangamma – Oldest woman to give birth (born 1946)
- Mum-Zi – Youngest known grandmother
