= Patricia Rashbrook =

British psychiatrist (born 1943)

Dr Patricia Rashbrook (born 1943), also known as Patti Farrant, is the oldest woman to give birth in the United Kingdom. It was announced she was pregnant, following IVF treatment, on 4 May 2006, and then gave birth to a son on 5 July at the age of 62 by caesarean section at Sussex County Hospital in Brighton. The baby was healthy and weighed 6 lb 10½oz; he was named Jude. The child was her first with husband John, though she already had three children from a previous marriage. Dr Rashbrook is a child psychiatrist and some criticism has been levelled at her for choosing to become pregnant at such an old age. She claims she will always act in the best interests of her son. She received an IVF treatment from controversial Italian fertility expert Severino Antinori.
