= Federal Institute for Population Research =

German Institute for Population Research

Bundesinstitut für Bevölkerungsforschung (BiB)
- Federal Institute for Population Research; Bundesinstitut für Bevölkerungsforschung

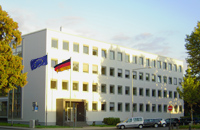
- Office building of the BiB in Wiesbaden

Agency overview
- Formed: 12 February 1973
- Jurisdiction: Federal institution (nicht rechtsfähige Bundesanstalt)
- Headquarters: Wiesbaden, Germany
- Employees: 70
- Agency executive: Professor Dr. Christa Katharina Spieß, Director
- Parent agency: Federal Ministry of the Interior
- Website: http://www.bib.bund.de/en

The Federal Institute for Population Research (German: Bundesinstitut für Bevölkerungsforschung), abbreviated BiB, is a research institute of the German federal government under the portfolio of the Federal Ministry of the Interior (German: Bundesministerium des Innern, BMI) and has the task of providing scientific advice to the federal government on issues relating to demography and demographic trends in fertility, nuptiality, mortality, ageing and migration as well as global issues.

== Purpose and Tasks ==
The BiB was established on 12 February 1973 as a federal institution and belongs to the executive agencies of the Federal Ministry of the Interior. The establishment decree of the Federal Minister of the Interior of 12 February 1973 was supplemented by the decree of 28 July 1995, as well as by the new decree of 21 November 2007. It was called into being in the context of the immense fertility decline in Germany.

The three main areas of responsibility are:

- Research: In addition to continuous observations of demographic trends, thematic priorities of the main research areas are family and fertility, migration and mobility as well as demographic change and ageing. As part of its basic research, the BiB also conducts its own data collections.
- Policy advice: The research results of the BiB serve the basis for advice given to the Federal government and the Federal ministries. The institute provides information, interprets demographic trends and draws up expert scientific reports. In addition, it supports the Federal government in its international cooperation on population issues within the framework of the United Nations.
- Information: Research findings are disseminated, among others, through a large number of own publications addressing different target groups.

== Administration ==
The BiB has 70 employees on staff, including 56 researchers. The interdisciplinary team of researchers in the institute consists of sociologists, demographers, economists, geographers and other scientists.

The BiB is divided into three departments (research areas):

- Family and Fertility
- Migration and Mobility
- Demographic Change and Longevity

The BiB is supported in its scientific research by a board of trustees composed of nine researchers and nine representatives of the government departments.

Since 1 October 2021, the institute is headed by Prof. Christa Katharina Spieß. Previously, Prof. Norbert F. Schneider was Director of the BiB (from 1 April 2009 to 30 September 2021).

== Publications ==
In ten series of publications, the Federal Institute for Population Research (BiB) regularly publishes research results and current demographic facts for various target groups. The publications are aimed at science, politics and the general public. Most of the contents are openly accessible. The most important series are:

- Comparative Population Studies (CPoS) is an international peer-reviewed journal on demography and population studies. It is available online and is open access.
- Series on Population Studies (Beiträge zur Bevölkerungswissenschaft) are monographs or compilations that deal with demographic topics. The volumes appear one to three times per year.
- BiB Working Paper includes preliminary or final reports of research projects, surveys and reviews, but also academic articles before submission to relevant journals.
- BiB Data and Technical Reports contains data set descriptions and technical reports on population surveys carried out by the Federal Institute for Population Research.
- Population Research Bulletin (Bevölkerungsforschung Aktuell) provides information about current population research issues and news from the BiB.

Furthermore, the BiB publishes brochures, policy briefs and other reports at irregular intervals.

== Cooperation ==
The BiB has worked in several international research projects, including GGP, PPAS/DIALOG, FEMAGE, FFS and JobMob.

The BiB is cooperating with the European Association for Population Studies (EAPS) and has organised the European Population Conference (EPC), which is the largest European conference on population studies, in 2016. It is also a member of the Population Europe network.
