= Ramjit Raghav =

Indian man (1916–2020)

- Raghav in 2012
- Born: 1916; British India
- Died: 11 February 2020 (aged 104); India
- Known for: Oldest father
- Children: 2

Ramjit Raghav (1916 – 11 February 2020) was an Indian man who was claimed by various media outlets as the world's oldest father. He resided in Haryana with his wife. He claimed to have had his first child with his wife at age 94. He fathered a second child at age 96. A vegetarian who claimed to engage in sexual intercourse around three times a day, Raghav was chosen to be an ambassador for People for the Ethical Treatment of Animals (PETA) in November 2012.

== Biography ==
Ramjit Raghav was born in India in 1916. In his younger days, he worked as a professional wrestler. Later, he switched to farming.

Raghav was a strict vegetarian, living predominantly on milk, almonds and butter, and credits vegetarianism for his longevity and clean bill of health. He was quoted by The Telegraph as saying:

I have been a vegetarian all my life, and I credit my stamina and virility to my diet of vegetables and grains. Being a vegetarian is the secret to my strength and good health.

In 2010, at the supposed age of 94, Raghav claimed to have become the world's oldest father when his wife, then aged 49, gave birth to a son, whom the couple named Bikramjeet.

In November 2012, PETA selected Raghav to be one of its international ambassadors. He was featured in a PETA awareness-raising advertisement with the slogan "Vegetarians Still Got It at the Age of 96".

In 2012, when Raghav claimed to have been 96, his 52-year-old spouse allegedly gave birth to another son, named Ranjeet. Raghav stated that the couple would not have a third child, as they were experiencing financial troubles. He also announced that his wife would be undergoing tubal ligation to avoid the possibility of an accidental pregnancy.

Raghav died in a fire at his home in February 2020 at the age of 104.

== Oldest fathers: medical considerations ==
The website of Guinness World Records lists the oldest father ever as Australian Les Colley (1898–1998), who allegedly fathered his ninth child at age 92 with a Fijian woman he met through a dating agency. In contrast, in a random international sample of 11,548 men confirmed to be biological fathers by DNA paternity testing, the oldest father was found to be just 66 years old at the birth of his child. Regarding Raghav's case, an Indian hospital worker stated, "Having babies at such an age is a remote possibility, but it just needs one sperm to fertilise an egg."

== See also ==
- Erramatti Mangamma
