= Adriana Iliescu =

Romanian philologist, writer and university teacher

- Born: 31 May 1938 (age 88); Craiova, Romania
- Occupations: University teacher, philologist, writer
- Children: Eliza Maria (b. 2005)

Adriana Iliescu (born 31 May 1938) is a Romanian retired university teacher, philologist and author of children's novels. She received international media attention in early 2005, when she gave birth to daughter Eliza at age 66, making her the oldest birth mother in the world until this record was broken in 2006 by María del Carmen Bousada de Lara. Eliza, who was delivered at Giuleşti Maternity Hospital in Bucharest on 16 January 2005, is Iliescu's surrogate child, since she gestated in Iliescu's womb but was conceived by an ovum and sperm donated anonymously.

== Pregnancy ==
Iliescu was first given hormone treatment to reverse menopause in 1995 and in vitro fertilisation (three zygotes with sperm and ovum from two anonymous donors) in 2004, becoming pregnant with triplets. After ten weeks, one of the three fetuses failed to progress and died. The remaining two fetuses, both girls, weighed just 1.45 kilograms (3.19 pounds) and 0.69 kilograms (1.54 pounds) after 33 weeks of pregnancy, but after complications the smaller of the two died in the womb. Though doctors were expecting to perform a caesarian section soon after the 34th week, the death of one of the twins led to the decision to operate earlier than planned. The surviving baby was expected to remain in hospital for six weeks.

== International interest ==
Romanian laws governing the process are currently under review and, to bring them in line with typical European legislation, may prevent any form of such treatment after the age of 50.

The story became international news, causing debate as to whether fertility treatment is ethical after a certain age. The release of details about the pregnancy and birth was criticised when different information was reported by different news companies. One primary source was a Realitatea TV interview with Iliescu conducted a month before the birth. The age of Iliescu was reported as 67 by some sources and the exact details of the second, and in some reports third, fetus differed greatly. For example, a CNN news website article was updated after a day, changing her age from 67 to 66. Gheorghe Borcean, head of the Romanian medical profession's ethics committee, commented: "A case of such prominence should require academic debates and not just one single television report." Iliescu's remarkable birth was even vaguely referenced in the season 7 episode of Law & Order: Special Victims Unit, "Taboo".

The website of British newspaper The Daily Telegraph asked the public what their opinion of the ethical decision was.

== Works ==
=== Studies ===
- Literatorul. Studiu monografic, Bucharest, 1968
- Revistele literare de la sfîrsitul secolului al XlX-lea, Bucharest, 1972
- Realismul in literatura romana in secolul al XIX- lea, Bucharest, 1975
- Proza realista in secolul al XlX-lea, Bucharest, 1978

=== Books ===
- Domnisoara cu miozotis, 1970
- Insula, 1971
- Orasul, 1978
