= Women's Hospital International and Fertility Centre =

Private specialized hospital in Uganda

- Location within Kampala

Geography
- Location: Bukoto-Kisaasi Road, Bukoto, Kampala, Central Region, Uganda
- Coordinates: 00°21′02″N 32°35′57″E

Organisation
- Care system: Private
- Type: Specialized

History
- Founded: 2004; 22 years ago

Links
- Website: Homepage
- Other links: List of hospitals in Uganda

Women's Hospital International and Fertility Centre (WHI&FC), is a private specialized healthcare facility in Uganda. It specializes in the treatment of infertile couples.

== Location ==
The hospital is located on the Bukoto–Kisaasi Road, in the neighborhood called Bukoto, in the city of Kampala, Uganda's capital. This is approximately 4 kilometres (2 mi), by road, northeast of Mulago National Referral Hospital. WHI&FC is located about 7 kilometres (4 mi), by road, northeast of the central business district of Kampala. The coordinates of Women's Hospital International and Fertility Centre are: 0°21'02.0"N, 32°35'57.0"E (Latitude:0.350552; Longitude:32.599165).

== Overview ==
WHI&FC was established in 2004. The hospital offers services in gynaecology, maternity and fertility in the countries of the East African Community and the Great Lakes region. The hospital is credited with the conception and delivery of the first in vitro baby in Uganda. Since then, at least 20,000 such babies had been conceived and delivered at the hospital, as of December 2017. In November 2009, a 54-year-old mother delivered a healthy in vitro baby at WHI&FC.

== Co-founders ==
Dr. Edward G. Tamale-Sali co-founded the Women's Hospital International and Fertility Centre (WHIFC) in Kampala with his wife, Kate Tamale-Sali. The centre was established to provide specialized fertility, obstetric and gynaecological services in Uganda and became one of the early centres for assisted reproductive medicine in East Africa. Under Tamale-Sali's leadership, WHIFC established Uganda's first in vitro fertilisation (IVF) programme, with the country's first IVF birth occurring at the centre in 2004.

== Services offered ==
As of November 2020, the following services are available at WHI&FC. The list is not exhaustive: 1. Antenatal Care 2. Labor and delivery 3. Cesarean birth 4. Postnatal care 5. Gynecological laparoscopy 6. Laparoscopic surgery 7. In vitro conception 8. Surrogate conception 9. Investigation of infertility in men and women

== Other considerations ==
WHI&FC maintains a subsidiary clinic in Kigali, Rwanda, known as Kigali IVF and Fertility Clinic, opened in 2014.

== See also ==
- Kampala Capital City Authority
- List of hospitals in Uganda
- International Hospital Kampala
- Nakasero Hospital
- Mulago National Referral Hospital
