= Panayiotis Zavos =

Cypriot-American biologist (born 1944)

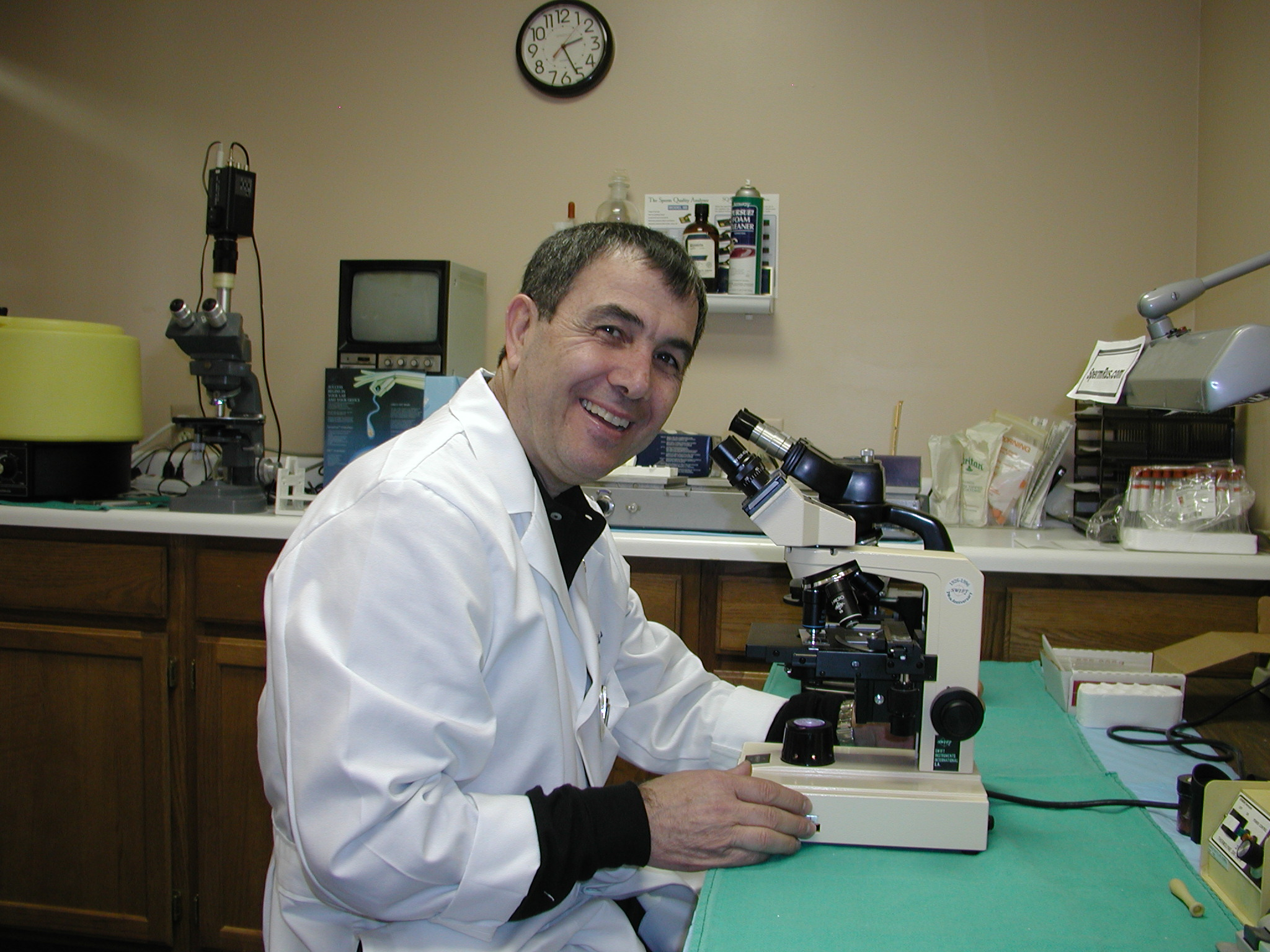
- Dr. Zavos at the Andrology Institute of America
- Born: February 23, 1944 (age 82); Trikomo, Cyprus
- Other name: Panos
- Citizenship: Citizen of the United States (1978-present); Citizen of Cyprus (1944-present)
- Education: Emporia State University (BS, MS, EdS); University of Minnesota (PhD)
- Website: https://www.profzavos.com

Panayiotis Michael Zavos (Greek: Παναγιώτης Ζαβός), or Panos Zavos (Πάνος Ζαβός, pronounced [zaˈvos]), is a physiologist who was born in Cyprus and later emigrated to the United States. Zavos has been the subject of controversy for making unsubstantiated claims that he can clone human beings.

== Academic career ==
Zavos received a Bachelor of Science in biology-chemistry in 1970, a Master of Science in biology-physiology in 1972, and an Education Specialist in Science (Ed.S.) in 1976 from Emporia State University in Emporia, Kansas. He earned a doctorate in animal physiology in 1978 from the University of Minnesota. He also received an MBA in 2008. He received the Distinguished Alumnus Award from Emporia State University

Zavos is Professor Emeritus in reproductive physiology at the University of Kentucky. He was named as an Honorary Professor by the Chinese Academy of Sciences, and as a Professor Emeritus by the Venkateshwara Institute of Medicine in India. He has served as a member of the International Advisory Committee of the Middle East Fertility Society.

== Human Cloning ==
Zavos have created and implanted cloned human embryos. However, Zavos' claims were roundly dismissed after he failed to produce any proof and have been widely condemned by doctors, politicians, and religious and pressure groups.

Professor Hans Evers, chairman of the European Society of Human Reproduction and Embryology, stated: "All the scientific evidence so far indicates that it is completely impossible to clone humans. Anyone claiming that he is going to clone a human does not know what he is talking about. All these guys, including Zavos are doing damage to the profession and goodwill we have built up for many years in the area of fertility treatments."

Professor Robert Winston, emeritus professor of fertility studies at Imperial College London, said "I do not know of any credible evidence that suggests Dr Zavos can clone a human being. This seems to be yet another one of his claims to get repeated publicity".

Arthur Caplan, a bioethicist at the University of Pennsylvania said of Zavos, "I think he is the most dangerous of the current fringe proponents of cloning, because he knows more, stretches the facts, and seems to be wallowing in a mix of publicity and fund-raising that rests on a foundation of hype."

UK Health Secretary John Reid condemned Zavos' attempts to create a cloned human baby as a "gross misuse of genetic science".

Spyros Simitis, the brother of former Greek Prime Minister Costas Simitis, characterized Zavos's claims as "scientific barbarism". He said that if human cloning were to become reality, it would mean the "end of human freedom and evolution". He also referred to the possible use of cloning by governments for controlling and shaping society according to the government's will.
