= 100th Jäger Division =

- German: 100. Jäger-Division
- Unit logos of the 100th light infantry
- Active: 10 October 1940 – 1945
- Country: Nazi Germany
- Branch: Army
- Type: Infantry
- Role: light infantry
- Size: Division
- Garrison/HQ: Glogau / Freistadt O.S

The 100th Jäger Division (German: 100. Jäger-Division), initially designated 100th (Light) Infantry Division (100. (leichte) Infanterie-Division), was a light infantry division of the German Army during World War II. As such, it was provided with partial horse or motor transport and lighter artillery. Light divisions were reduced in size compared to standard infantry divisions. The Walloon Legion was briefly attached to this division from January 1942 to May 1942. During the latter stages of the war, the division was composed of members from most of Germany's geographic areas and Silesians from Upper Silesia.

== Background ==
Unit Logo of the 100th Jaeger Division

The main purpose of the German Jäger Divisions was to fight in adverse terrain where smaller, coordinated formations were more facilely combat capable than the brute force offered by their standard infantry counterparts. The Jäger divisions were more heavily equipped than the mountain Gebirgsjäger equivalents, but not as well armed as a larger infantry division. In the early stages of the war, it was the interface divisions fighting in rough terrain and foothills as well as urban areas, between the mountains and the plains. The Jägers (means "hunters" in German) relied on a high degree of training, and slightly superior communications, as well as their not inconsiderable artillery support. In the middle stages of the war, as the standard infantry divisions were downsized, the Jäger structure of divisions with two infantry regiments, became the standard table of organization.

In 1944, Adolf Hitler declared that all infantry divisions were now Volksgrenadier Divisions except for his elite Jäger and Mountain Jäger divisions.

== Operational history ==
Initially established in December 1940 as the 100th Light Infantry Division, the unit was raised in Upper Austria, and based in Ried. The 54th Jäger Regiment was detached from the 18th Infantry. The division comprised two-thirds Austrian and one-third Silesian.

The 100th Light Infantry Division's first campaign as a fighting force was Operation Barbarossa, the invasion of the Soviet Union, where it served with the 17th Army in the Southern Sector. On July 10, 1941, the division entered the Jewish town of Zinkiv and carried out a pogrom. Jewish men and women who attempted to interact with the invading division after emerging from their hiding spots were shot and murdered on sight by the division. Its first campaign was in the Battle of Uman, followed by action at Kiev and Odessa.

In October, the 369th Reinforced Croatian Infantry Regiment was attached to the division to bolster its size when attacking the Eastern Front.

The formation was the only German Jäger Division that fought at the Battle of Stalingrad. The 100th Light Infantry Division, along with the 369th Reinforced Croatian Infantry Regiment, was virtually destroyed at Stalingrad.

== The restoration of the division and its conversion to a Jäger Division. ==
After the destruction of the division at Stalingrad, it was reformed in March 1943. During the period of restoration, the division was moved to Albania, where it was tasked with combating partisan groups. The situation became more complicated when Italy switched sides in September 1943. The division had to secure the coast from the Italians. In December 1943 the division received a new tactical sign. A green oak leaf and a white sign.

At the beginning of January 1944, the division was moved to Hungary, where it was supposed to take part in Operation Margarethe alongside other Axis forces. After a regime change in Hungary, the division should be relocated to southern France. However, in early March, the division was instead tasked with relieving the encircled 2nd Army in the Zlotyky and Podajec area.

=== At the Strypa, ===
the division was positioned defensively at the river Styrpa. After the initial battles in March, the unit was instructed to dig in and hold their position. The unit received reinforcements and new officers. In early May, the division was supplied with new anti-tank weapons Panzerfaust to defend against the mass of Russian tanks. During Operation Bagration, the division saw little action. However, at 19 July, the division was forced to retreat to the Carpathian Mountains.

=== Carpathian Mountains and Slovakia ===
During this time, the division had time to rest again. The tank destroyer battalion was sent to Mlawa for training. After losing the Carpathian position, the division had to retreat to the ridge area, where it received a large number of defensive fighters. When the front stabilized, the division was transported to the Ludwig position in Slovakia on October 10.

In the new position, the division received new recruits. On October 3, the trained tank destroyer units returned with new weapons, Marder III auf H and Panzerjäger IV. In the final battle in Slovakia, the division had its first encounter with IS-2 tanks, which it destroyed in combat.

=== Silesia ===
On 1 January 1945, the 100th Jäger Division, then under Army Group Heinrici of Army Group A had a strength of 9,669 men. On January 18, the division was moved to Upper Silesia. On the first day, it was involved in heavy fighting in the Cosel area. After defending and launching counterattacks, the division had to stabilize the front in the Krappitz area, where the Russians had crossed the Oder bridge. On January 25, the Jaegers captured the city without heavy fighting. Since then, the German forces in the paper factory had to defend themselves against Russian forces. After they stabilized the front in Krappitz they were assigned to take back the Oder river in the Area of Mechnitz - Eichhagen. On the Morning of 3 February, they counterattacked the Russian bridgehead. On February 5, after a heavy Fight in the Village of Eichhagen, the Jaeger received the order to move to the Cosel Area, where they have been needed to counter the Russian Advanced. On February 9, the division surrendered its position in the Strelitz area to the Russians. The division continued to fight in the Lower Silesia area until the last day of the war. In April 1945, they received heavy artillery support. They will use them to take in May 1945 the Town of Legnitz back. The division's final deployment took place on April 24, when it was deployed in the Jauer area. After a successful counterattack the Division take Legnitz back. On May 5, the division began to move west, where it eventually surrendered in the Czech Republic.

== Division structure ==
- 54th Jäger Regiment (moved from 18th Infantry Division)
- 227th Jäger Regiment
- 83rd Artillery Regiment
- 100th Reconnaissance Battalion
- 100th Panzerjäger Battalion
- 100th Engineer Battalion
- 100th Signal Battalion
- 100th Field Replacement Battalion
- 100th Divisional Supply Troops
- 369th (Croatian) Reinforced Infantry Regiment (attached from October 1941)

== Notable members ==
- A total of 46 members of the 100th Jäger Division were awarded the German Cross in Gold, and 12 were awarded the Knight's Cross.
- The following individuals received a certificate of recognition from the Commander-in-Chief of the Army:
- Recipients of the Certificate of Recognition:
- Lieutenant Heinzel, 16th Company/IR 54 - Awarded on August 20, 1941
- Sergeant Holzmann, Platoon Leader, 15th Company/IR 54 - Awarded on August 20, 1941, Staff Sergeant Gottfried Rock,
- Platoon Leader, JR 227 - Awarded on October 17, 1944
- Recipients of the Knight's Cross:
- Lieutenant Colonel Franz Weller, Regimental Commander JR 54 - Awarded on September 4, 1941
- Lieutenant General Werner Sanne, Division Commander 100th JD - Awarded on February 22,
- 1942 Colonel Franz Neibecker, Regimental Commander JR 227 - Awarded on February 16, 1942
- Captain Franz Klausgraber, Battalion Commander III. Btl./JR 227 - Awarded on March 13, 1942
- Captain Hans-Günther Braun von Stumm, Commander of the Reconnaissance Detachment 100 - Awarded on July 20, 1942
- Captain Otto Heger, Battalion Commander II. Btl./JR 227 - Awarded on September 21, 1944
- Lieutenant Otto Schneider, Leader of Pi.Kp./JR 54 - Awarded on October 28, 1944
- First Lieutenant Rudolf Kühnfels, Company Commander JR 54 - Awarded on December 9, 1944
- First Lieutenant Josef Wagner, Company Commander 1. Kp./JR 227 - Awarded on February 18, 1945
- Senior Hunter Adolf Grubinger, Machine Gun Leader 9. Kp./JR 227 - Awarded on February 28, 1945
- Senior Hunter Friedrich Pein, Sharpshooter 2. Kp./JR 227 - Awarded on February 28, 1945
- Senior Hunter Josef Preiss, Group Leader 15th Kp./JR 227 - Awarded on April 20, 1945

== Commanding officers ==
- Lieutenant General Werner Sanne (10 October 1940 – 31 January 1943)
- Lieutenant General Willibald Utz (25 April 1943 – 1 January 1945)
- Major General Otto Schury (1 February 1945 – May 1945)
