= Algaza =

Algaza Алгаза
- Selo
- Location within Astrakhan Oblast Location within Russia
- Coordinates: 46°11′N 47°50′E
- Country: Russia
- Region: Astrakhan Oblast
- District: Ikryaninsky District
- Time zone: UTC+4:00

Algaza (Russian: Алгаза) is a rural locality (a selo) in Bakhtemirsky Selsoviet of Ikryaninsky District, Astrakhan Oblast, Russia. The population was 480 as of 2010. There are 5 streets.

== Geography ==
Algaza is located 17 km northeast of Ikryanoye (the district's administrative centre) by road. Krasnye Barrikady is the nearest rural locality.
