= Marko Mesić (soldier) =

Croatian soldier (1901–1982)

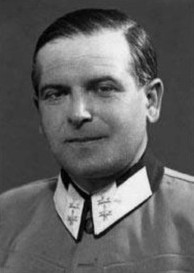
- Born: 30 September 1901; Bjelovar, Croatia-Slavonia, Austria-Hungary (now Croatia)
- Died: 9 February 1982 (aged 80); Zagreb, SR Croatia, Yugoslavia (now Croatia)
- Burial place: Mirogoj Cemetery
- Relatives: Franjo Mesić (father); Katarina Blau (mother); Dragutin Mesić (brother)
- Military career
- Allegiance: Kingdom of Yugoslavia; Independent State of Croatia; Nazi Germany; SFR Yugoslavia
- Branch: Royal Yugoslav Army; Croatian Home Guard; Wehrmacht (Croatian Legion); Yugoslav People's Army
- Service years: 1941–1945
- Rank: Colonel
- Commands: Croatian Legion
- Wars: World War II
- Awards: Iron Cross; Military Order of the Iron Trefoil

Marko Mesić (30 September 1901 – 9 February 1982) was a decorated gunnery officer who served in the armies of the Kingdom of Yugoslavia, the Independent State of Croatia, and the SFR Yugoslavia. He is best known for being the final commander of Croatian legionnaires in World War II, serving in the German Wehrmacht on the Eastern Front in the Battle of Stalingrad, and later joining the Yugoslav People's Army.

== Early life ==
Mesić was born in Bjelovar, Croatia (then part of the Austrian-Hungarian Empire), to Franjo and Katarina Mesić (née Blau). He received eight years of schooling in Pécs, Hungary; Karlovac, Croatia; and Maribor, Slovenia, before graduating as an artillery/gunnery officer at the Royal Yugoslav Military Academy in Belgrade.

He served as an active commissioned officer in Royal Yugoslav Army artillery units until 1941. At the start of the April War, Mesić was artillery Lieutenant Colonel in command of the Royal Yugoslav Army artillery regiment serving in Niš, near the Bulgarian border.

== Croatian Legion ==
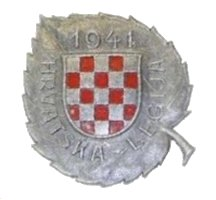
369th Legion Memorial badge

After Nazi Germany defeated the Royal Yugoslav Army during the brief April War in 1941, Mesić joined the army of the Independent State of Croatia (a Nazi puppet state), the Croatian Home Guard, in Varaždin. He was promptly assigned to the 369th (Croatian) Reinforced Infantry Regiment (the "Croatian Legion"), a unit of the 100th Light Infantry Division, where he held the rank of lieutenant colonel of the artillery section. The Croatian Legion was formally a German Army (Wehrmacht) formation and was under full German command because the Independent State of Croatia never officially declared war on the Soviet Union. The regiment wore Croatian Home Guard uniforms.

With Mesić as the artillery section commander, the 369th Regiment saw action against Russian forces in October 1941 after an exhausting 35-day, 750 kilometres (470 mi) march to the village of Budinskaja. The 369th Regiment was highly successful in difficult battles during the winter of 1941 and in the following spring and summer. Due to illness, regiment commander Colonel Ivan Markulj was transferred back to Croatia and Mesić temporarily replaced him on 7 July 1942. Mesić was later replaced by a new commander, Colonel Viktor Pavičić. Division commander General Sanne commended Mesić's artillery section on 21 and 22 February 1942; on 23 February 1942, he awarded Mesić with the Iron Cross.

The legion experienced its most difficult battles at Harkov when Mesić was the artillery commander, including a very costly two-day battle at kolhoz Proljet Kultura. The regiment attacked Proljet Kultura on 27 July 1942, but an overwhelming Soviet counterattack the next day killed 53 and wounded 186 Legion soldiers. The Legion's bravery and success was admired by General Paulus, leading him to select the Legion as the only non-German unit to enter Stalingrad.

=== Battle of Stalingrad ===
Along with the rest of the Croatian Legion, Mesić participated in the Battle of Stalingrad on the Eastern Front. Mesić had a short period of leave in October 1942, but returned to Stalingrad thereafter. By January 1943, the Croatian Legion had suffered heavy losses. Its duties consisting of mainly holding the famous Red October factory frontline, where the regiment suffered heavy casualties. Mesić and his artillery unit were stationed in and around the Stalingrad flight school runway known as Stalingradskaja. Mesić became the last commander of the Croatian Legion on 14 January 1943, after the resignation and disappearance of Colonel Pavičić, who recommended Mesić to General Sanne as his successor. The Legion surrendered to General Aleksandr Vasilevsky around 29 or 30 January 1943.

After the surrender of the German Sixth Army by General Paulus on 2 February, Mesić became a prisoner of war, along with fifteen other officers, approximately 100 wounded combat soldiers, and 600 other members of the Croatian Legion. The regiment lost 175 soldiers during these last two weeks, or approximately twenty percent of their regiment. Presuming he was dead, German officials posthumously promoted Mesić to full colonel and awarded him the Iron Cross 1st Class and the Military Order of the Iron Trefoil with the rank of "Knight of Croatia" of the Independent State of Croatia. In an official report dated 30 June 1943, Lieutenant Rudolf Baričević commended Mesić's bravery and leadership, calling him "an exemplary officer" and "true soldier." The report did not mention the Legion's official commander, Colonel Pavičić.

Mesić and the remaining members of the legion were first assembled at Beketovka on the Volga River, where they were joined by some 80,000 POWs, consisting mainly of Germans, as well as some Italians, Romanians, and Hungarians. The POWs were sent on a forced march to Moscow, where they were to be joined by their comrades from Light Transport Brigade assigned to Italian forces on the Eastern Front. Many died along the march due to typhoid, dysentery, anemia, and scurvy.

== Yugoslav Army ==
In the summer 1943, Mesić, six officers, and 100 legionnaires were transferred to Suzdal and then to Krasnogorsk near Moscow, where they later met with most of the other surviving men. At Krasnogorsk, and later Karasovo, the Soviets started to form them into a new unit in Royal Yugoslav uniforms (Soviets did not recognise Tito's forces as belonging to a sovereign state). During his imprisonment, Mesić appeared in Soviet propaganda, wearing a Royal Yugoslav Army uniform with Tito's flag. He may have been forced to do so in order to save the lives of his remaining comrades. Upon learning of his appearance, the Ministry of the Armed Forces removed him from the Croatian Armed Forces and rescinded his awards.

During 1944, Mesić was given command by the Soviets of the newly formed First Yugoslav Volunteer Brigade, assembled from prisoners of war of Yugoslavian origin, as well as volunteers living in Russia at the time. Mesić was once again given the rank of colonel. The new Yugoslav partisan brigade, now wearing old Royal Yugoslav Army uniforms, was also commanded by former Croatian Legion officers such as Lieutenant Colonel Egon Žitnik, Major Marijan Prišlin, and Major Marijan Tuličić.

This unit, like many other "national' units, was to become a part of Yugoslav People's Army and was transported to Yugoslavia during 1944. During a battle for Čačak in late 1944, Mesić and his men were sent against superior retreating German forces (of the 104th Jäger Division and the 7th SS "Prinz Eugen" division) which nearly destroyed Mesić's unit. Partisan units supporting Mesić and his unit fled in disarray early on, leaving Mesić and his unit dangerously exposed, leading to 137 dead, 330 wounded, and 72 missing in action from the unit. These casualties were unprecedented in the partisan war at that point. Tito was reportedly angrier than ever before when he subsequently interviewed Mesić. Tito verbally attacked Mesić during the meeting for his legionnaire fascist past. Tito did not order Mesić punished, but many of Mesić's comrades were not so fortunate. One of Mesić's predecessors from the Croatian Legion, Ivan Markulj was executed in Belgrade in September 1945.

After the defeat at Čačak, Yugoslav partisan commanders removed Mesić and many of his former 369th comrades from the brigade in Belgrade late 1944. Some of them, such as Lieutenant Nikola Sabski, the acting intelligence officer of the brigade, were shot as suspected Gestapo collaborators. Many were also suspected of being Soviet infiltrators. The brigade subsequently suffered heavy casualties battling retreating German forces during 1945 on the Syrmian Front and near Slavonski Brod.

== Post-war ==
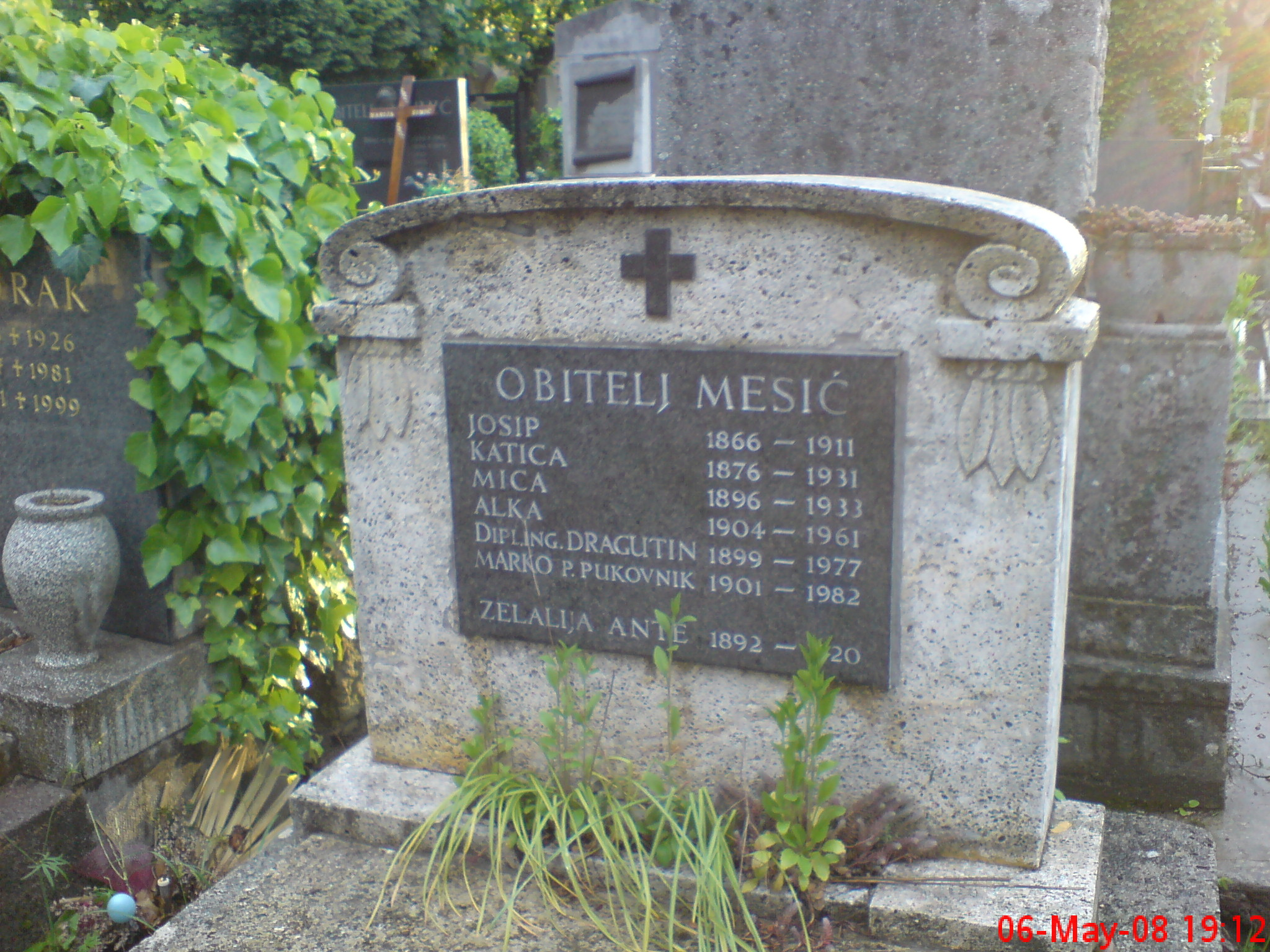
Mesić family tombstone at Mirogoj Cemetery

In 1945, after the war, Marko Mesić retired as a colonel of Yugoslav Army and lived quietly in Zagreb. His Nazi collaboration was forgotten or forgiven, and he lived freely until the Informbiro period, when he was suspected, along with thousands of others, of espionage for Russian secret services.

Mesić lost both of his legs under a running train sometime during 1950 in suspicious circumstances, possibly in UDBA custody when he was being transferred to Belgrade for interrogation. The official story was that he fell under the train; other sources claim he was pushed. His brother Dragutin claimed that he lost his legs attempting to escape from Yugoslav captivity. Mesić, now reliant on a wheelchair, was later freed and left alone to live quietly with his brother in Zagreb until his death in 1982 from old age. He is buried at Mirogoj Cemetery in Zagreb.

== Awards ==
Mesić received the following awards during his service:

- Iron Cross 1st Class
- Iron Cross 2nd Class
- Eastern Front Medal
- Military Order of the Iron Trefoil 2nd Class
- Military Order of the Iron Trefoil 4th Class
