= Staro-Volzhsky =

Staro-Volzhsky Старо-Волжский
- Settlement
- Location within Astrakhan Oblast Location within Russia
- Coordinates: 45°51′N 47°41′E
- Country: Russia
- Region: Astrakhan Oblast
- District: Ikryaninsky District
- Time zone: UTC+4:00

Staro-Volzhsky (Russian: Старо-Волжский) is a rural locality (a settlement) in Zhitninsky Selsoviet, Ikryaninsky District, Astrakhan Oblast, Russia. The population was 968 as of 2010. There are 7 streets.

== Geography ==
Staro-Volzhsky is located 34 km south of Ikryanoye (the district's administrative centre) by road. Chulpan is the nearest rural locality.
