= Yamnoye =

Yamnoye (Russian: Ямное) is the name of several rural localities in Russia:

- Yamnoye, Volodarsky District, Astrakhan Oblast, a selo in Volodarsky District, Astrakhan Oblast
- Yamnoye, Ikryaninsky District, Astrakhan Oblast, a selo in Ikryaninsky District, Astrakhan Oblast
