= Sedlistoye =

Sedlistoye Седлистое
- Selo
- Location within Astrakhan Oblast Location within Russia
- Coordinates: 45°49′N 47°39′E
- Country: Russia
- Region: Astrakhan Oblast
- District: Ikryaninsky District
- Time zone: UTC+4:00

Sedlistoye (Russian: Седлистое) is a rural locality (a selo) and the administrative center of Sedlistinsky Selsoviet in Ikryaninsky District, Astrakhan Oblast, Russia. The population was 956 as of 2010. There are 13 streets.

== Geography ==
Sedlistoye is located 39 km south of Ikryanoye (the district's administrative centre) by road. Zhitnoye is the nearest rural locality.
