= Ivan Markulj =

Croatian soldier (1889–1945)

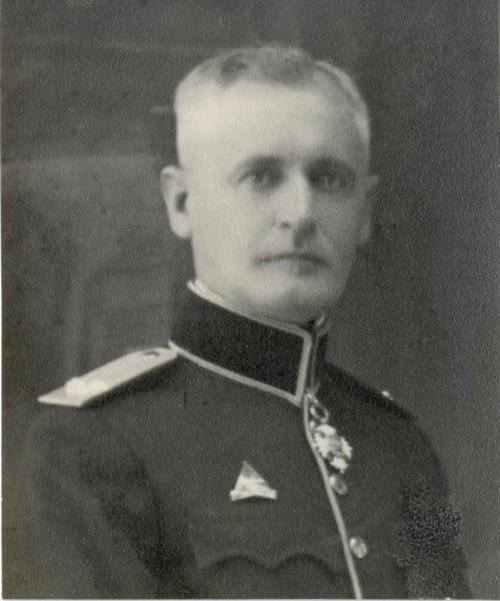
- Ivan Markulj In Royal Yugoslav Army Uniform
- Born: 11 February 1889; Mostar, Condominium of Bosnia and Herzegovina, Austria-Hungary
- Died: September 1945 (aged 56); Belgrade, FS Serbia, DF Yugoslavia
- Military career
- Allegiance: Austria-Hungary; Kingdom of Yugoslavia; Independent State of Croatia; Nazi Germany
- Branch: Austro-Hungarian Army; Royal Yugoslav Army; Croatian Home Guard
- Service years: 191?–1945
- Rank: Colonel (Yugoslavia); General (NDH)
- Unit: 369th Reinforced Infantry Regiment (Germany/NDH)
- Commands: 369th Reinforced Infantry Regiment
- Conflicts: World War II; Eastern Front; Second Battle of Kharkov; Battle of Stalingrad
- Awards: Iron Cross 1st class

Ivan Markulj (11 February 1889 – September 1945) was a Croatian soldier, officer in the armies of the Austro-Hungarian Monarchy, the Kingdom of Yugoslavia, and the Independent State of Croatia. He was the first commander of the 369th Reinforced Infantry Regiment.

== Biography ==
Colonel Markulj was an officer in the Austro-Hungarian army, the Yugoslav Royal Army and finally the Croatian Home Guard of the Independent State of Croatia. After the establishment of the NDH, he served as commander of the Ustaše headquarters Pokupje in Karlovac, but soon became commander of the Varaždin Infantry Regiment.

After the heavy fighting and success of the 369th Reinforced Infantry Regiment in the battles near Kharkov in the spring of 1942, Colonel Markulj was awarded the Iron Cross of the First Class by order of the German general, commander of the 100th Chasseur Division Werner Sanne. After Kharkov, Colonel Markulj independently commanded the entire 369th Regiment as part of the 100th German Chasseur Division for the first time. Under his leadership, the 369th Regiment was particularly praised and decorated by the Germans for its heroic conduct and heavy losses during the Battle of Kharkov.

After Markulj's departure from Russia on June 26, 1942, the command of the regiment was taken over by Colonel Viktor Pavičić, the former commander of the NDH military academy in Zagreb.

Colonel Markulj returned from Russia to Croatia in mid-1942 after a full year of grueling fighting, probably due to illness or exhaustion. Later, during the war in Croatia and Bosnia, Markulj became a general of the NDH. During 1944, General Markulj headed the Zagreb City Command and later became commander of the 3rd Military District of the NDH in Sarajevo.

In May 1945 he retreated from the Partisans together with the Croatian Armed Forces to Austria and the West, where he surrendered to the Western Allies, but was soon extradited to the Yugoslav military authorities.

== Death ==
The Yugoslav military court in Belgrade in September 1945 sentenced General Markulj, along with a larger group of captured Ustaša officers, to death by firing squad.

== Sources ==
- Krunoslav Mikulan, Siniša Pogačić: Hrvatske oružane snage 1941. – 1945., Zagreb 1999.
- Ivan Košutić: Hrvatsko domobranstvo u Drugom svjetskom ratu, Zagreb 1992.
- Heroji za pogrešnu stvar: Bačeni na Staljingrad, Jutarnji list, 24. veljače 2008.
- Milan Pojić Hrvatska pukovnija 369. na Istočnom bojištu 1941. - 1943.
- Welz H. Verratene Grenadiere. — Berlin, Deutscher Militärverlag, 1965.
