= Trudfront =

Trudfront Трудфронт
- Selo
- Location within Astrakhan Oblast Location within Russia
- Coordinates: 45°56′N 47°40′E
- Country: Russia
- Region: Astrakhan Oblast
- District: Ikryaninsky District
- Time zone: UTC+4:00

Trudfront (Russian: Трудфронт) is a rural locality (a selo) in Ikryaninsky District, Astrakhan Oblast, Russia. The population was 2,721 as of 2010. There are 35 streets.

== Geography ==
Trudfront is located 25 km south of Ikryanoye (the district's administrative centre) by road. Chulpan is the nearest rural locality.
