= Zhitnoye =

Zhitnoye Житное
- Selo
- Location within Astrakhan Oblast Location within Russia
- Coordinates: 45°48′N 47°41′E
- Country: Russia
- Region: Astrakhan Oblast
- District: Ikryaninsky District
- Time zone: UTC+4:00

Zhitnoye (Russian: Житное) is a rural locality (a selo) and the administrative center of Zhitninsky Selsoviet of Ikryaninsky District, Astrakhan Oblast, Russia. The population was 1,902 as of 2010. There are 29 streets.

== Geography ==
Zhitnoye is located 42 km south of Ikryanoye (the district's administrative centre) by road. Mumra is the nearest rural locality.
