= Ninovka =

Ninovka Ниновка
- Selo
- Location within Astrakhan Oblast Location within Russia
- Coordinates: 45°52′N 47°37′E
- Country: Russia
- Region: Astrakhan Oblast
- District: Ikryaninsky District
- Time zone: UTC+4:00

Ninovka (Russian: Ниновка) is a rural locality (a selo) in Ikryaninsky District, Astrakhan Oblast, Russia. The population was 668 as of 2010. There are 8 streets.

== Geography ==
Ninovka is located 32 km south of Ikryanoye (the district's administrative centre) by road. Fyodorovka is the nearest rural locality.
