= 369th Croatian Reinforced Infantry Regiment =

369th Reinforced Infantry Regiment Verstärktes Kroatisches Infanterie-Regiment 369: 369. pojačana pješačka pukovnija
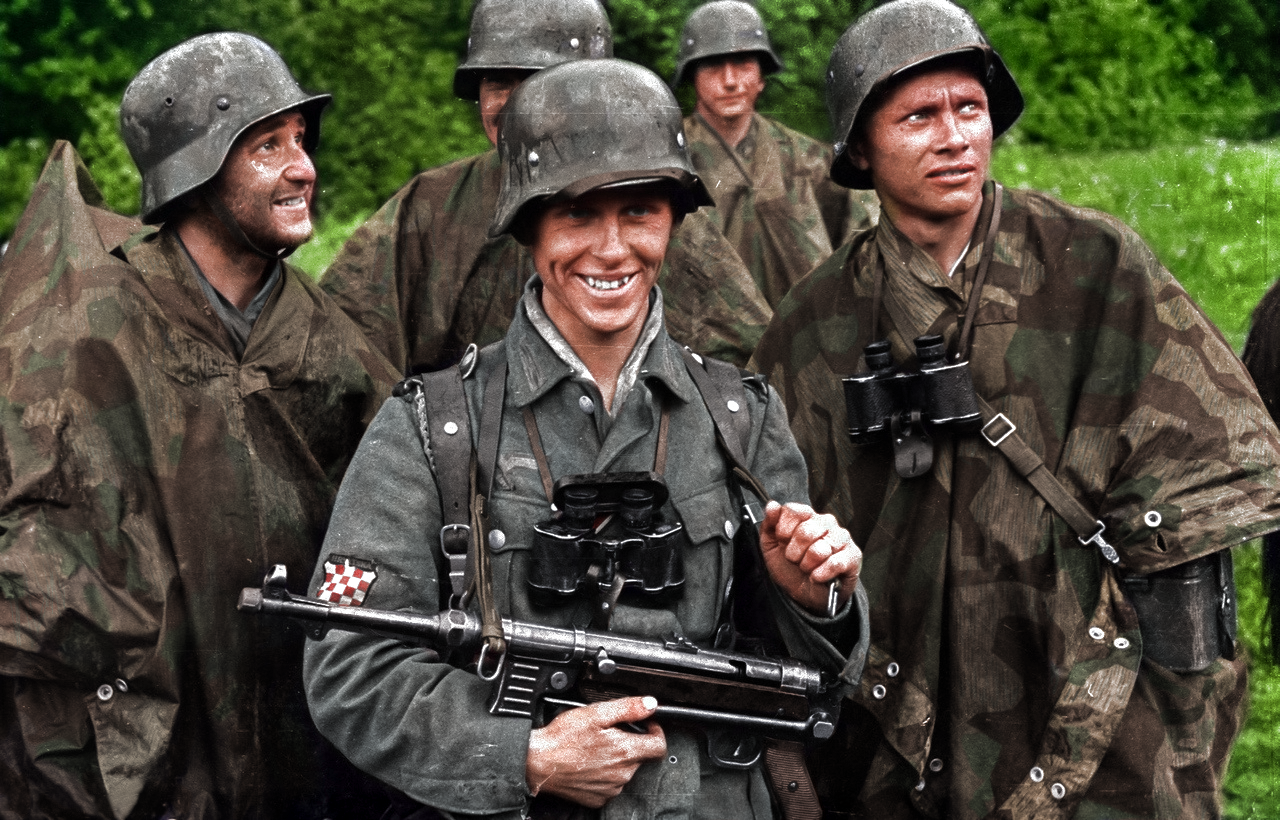
- Soldiers of the 369th Croatian Reinforced infantry regiment
- Active: 16 July 1941–January 1943
- Country: Croatia
- Allegiance: Germany
- Branch: Wehrmacht (Note: Even though they essentially constituted a unit of foreign volunteers within the Wehrmacht, the 369th Croatian Reinforced Infantry Regiment was officially part of the regular Croatian army (the Croatian Home Guard).)
- Type: Infantry
- Role: Infantry
- Size: Reinforced regiment
- Mottos: Što Bog da i sreća junačka! ("By the grace of God and a stroke of luck!" "lit. What God gives and luck of heroes!")
- Engagements: World War II; Eastern front; Second Battle of Kharkov; Battle of Stalingrad
- Decorations: Medal of Poglavnik Ante Pavelić for Bravery in gold

Commanders
- Notable commanders: Ivan Markulj; Viktor Pavičić †; Marko Mesić; Ivan Babić

Insignia
- Flags used by the Regiment

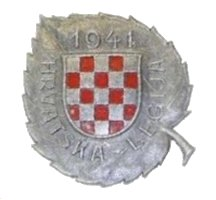
- Insignia used by the Regiment

The 369th (Croatian) Reinforced Infantry Regiment (German: Verstärktes (kroatisches) Infanterie-Regiment 369, Croatian: 369. pojačana pješačka pukovnija) was a regiment of the German Army raised to fight on the Eastern Front during World War II. The regiment was formed in July 1941 by Croatian volunteers from the Independent State of Croatia (NDH), including a Bosniak battalion. It was commonly referred to as the Croatian Legion (Hrvatska Legija). The troops swore a joint oath of allegiance to the Führer (leader of Germany, Adolf Hitler), the Poglavnik (leader of Croatia, Ante Pavelić), the German Reich (Nazi Germany) as well as to the NDH. The unit was sent to the Russian front, where it was attached to the 100th Jäger Division. On 31 January 1943, the 800 remaining Croatian legionaries, led by the unit's commander Marko Mesić, surrendered to the Soviet Red Army.

== Background ==
On 10 April 1941, the Independent State of Croatia (NDH, Croatian: Nezavisna Država Hrvatska) was created as a puppet state aligned with the occupying Germans. The Ustaše-led government of the NDH, which followed fascist policies, sought military and diplomatic assistance from Germany due to concerns over Italian territorial ambitions after ceding most of the coastal area of Dalmatia to Italy in treaties signed on 18 May 1941.

By 25 June 1941, Poglavnik Ante Pavelić, the leader of the NDH, sent an envoy to Berlin to offer volunteers to serve on the Eastern Front. By 2 July of the same year, Hitler accepted the offer, and military units were formed under the supervision of two German army officers.

== Formation ==
While not officially part of the Wehrmacht, the regiment was under German military jurisdiction and direct German command throughout its existence under the 100th Jäger Division. All volunteers of the 369th wore Wehrmacht service uniforms with a Croatian checkerboard patch incorporating the word Hrvatska (Croatia) on the upper right sleeve and the right side of their helmets.

Initially, two battalions were raised and formed into a regiment at Varaždin before a third battalion was raised at Sarajevo. Only Croats, Ukrainians and White Russians were accepted as volunteers, and about one third of those accepted were Bosnian Muslims, who were mostly admitted into the 1st battalion. A training battalion was formed for the regiment in Stockerau, Austria. The regiment was then transported to Döllersheim, Austria, for training. With a strength of 5,000, the regiment consisted of three infantry battalions, a machine-gun company, an anti-tank company, three field artillery batteries, a headquarters staff and a supply company.

On 21 August 1941, the regiment was transported to Romania. From there, it spent several weeks marching on foot to the front line. On 10th October, the regiment linked up on the line of the Dnieper River with the 100th Jäger Division, which was then part of the 17th Army, Army Group South.

== Military Action on Eastern Front ==
To accustom the regiment to the conditions and divisional procedures of the eastern front and further progress their training, the regiment's units were initially divided up among and stationed with other regiments immediately after their arrival on the front line near Kharkov. The divisional diary recorded that the main goal for units of the regiment during this period was to improve discipline across various areas. On 30 September 1941, Colonel Ivan Markulj sent 43 officers and NCOs and 144 soldiers back to the NDH due to illness and/or for disciplinary reasons.

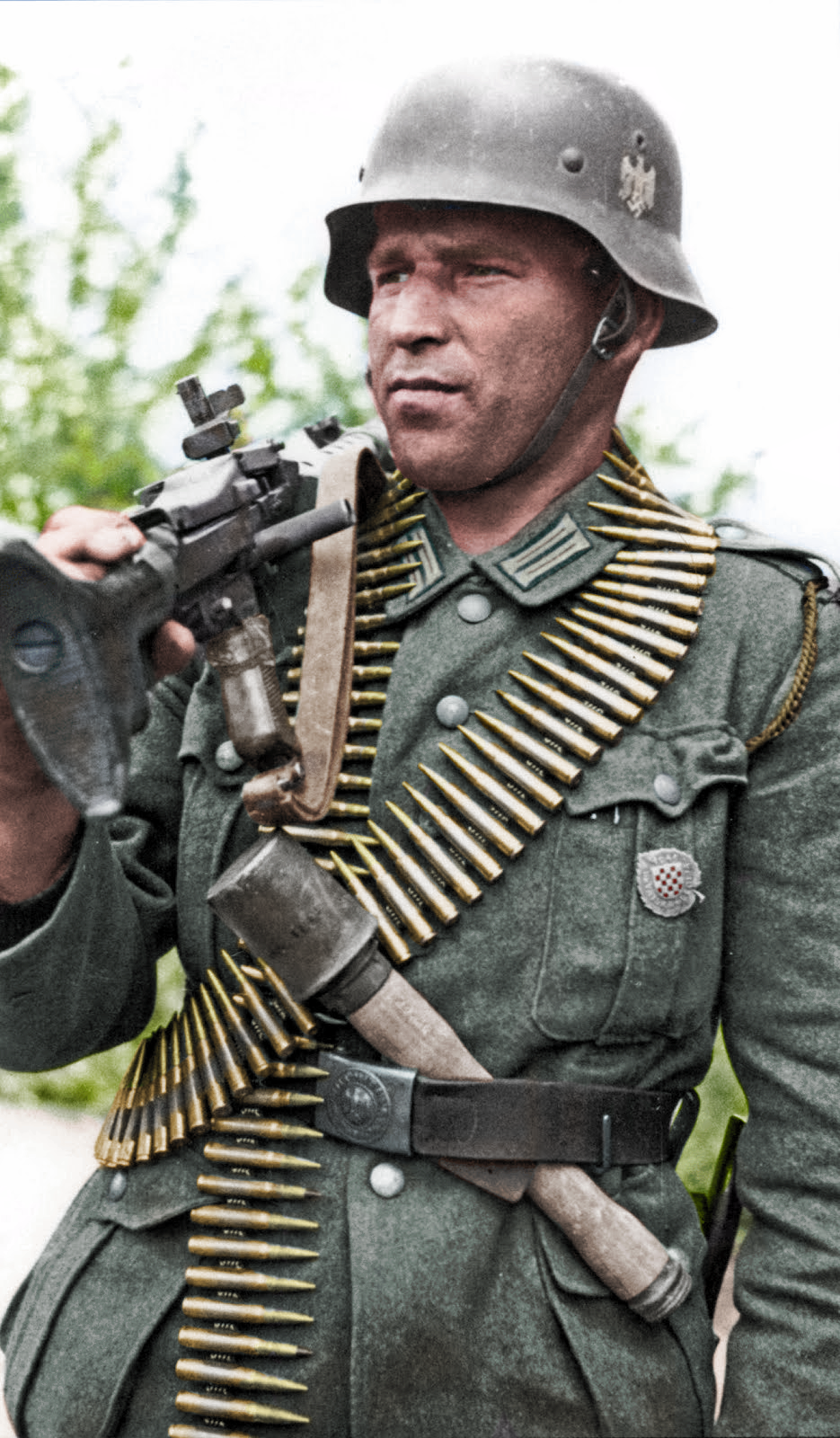
A volunteer soldier of the 369th Infantry Regiment, holding a MG34, with the shield of his unit on his jacket.

After the Red Army counterattacked and re-took Rostov in November 1941, the 100th Jäger Division marched south to the front line on the Mius River on November 22. Temperatures dropped as low as −18°C. The regiment's units, still divided among the other regiments of the division, dug in alongside the Slovak Mobile Brigade and SS-Division Wiking. In mid-January 1942, the 100th Jäger Division was deployed to the Stalino area to assist in fighting off a Soviet cavalry corps that had broken through the front line. Through some heavy fighting along the line of the Samara River, the division held on through the winter.

Starting in early 1942, soldiers were able to send messages back to the NDH. Troops wrote letters on various materials, including cigarette papers and notebook pages, due to paper shortages. Radio Zagreb broadcast communications from the regiment's soldiers but censored material detailing death or capture by the enemy.

Generalleutnant Werner Sanne, the 100th Jäger Division's commander, commended the regiment's successes over the winter, especially the actions of Lieutenant Colonel Marko Mesić's artillery battalion on 21–22 February 1942. On 23 February 1942, Sanne awarded Mesić the Iron Cross.

In April 1942, four volunteers were sentenced to death and shot, while many others were sentenced to imprisonment of between 2–10 years.

From mid-May 1942, the regiment was reunited under Colonel Markulj, after which the 100th Jäger Division joined in the final phases of the pincer attack on the Red Army bridgehead at Kharkiv. In June 1942, the division supported the 1st Panzer Army's drive along the Don River, through Voronezh to Kalach where the regiment incurred heavy casualties trying to cross the river in the face of serious resistance.

After the Second Battle of Kharkov, Colonel Markulj, Lieutenant Eduard Bakarec and six other regiment officers were awarded the Iron Cross First Class. A report dated 21 June 1942 states that the Legion contained 113 officers, 7 military clerks, 625 NCOs, and 4,317 soldiers, as well as 2,902 horses.

After participating in mopping-up operations in along the Don, the division rested briefly in September, and the regiment was reorganized after receiving reinforcements.

Markulj was transferred back to Croatia and was temporarily replaced by Colonel Marko Mesić on 7 July 1942 and Lieutenant Colonel Ivan Babić who was finally replaced by Colonel Viktor Pavičić.

At 'Proljet Kultura', the regiment suffered 53 deaths and 186 wounded combatants while in violent hand-to-hand combat during the German attack on 27 July and subsequent overwhelming Soviet counterattack on 28 July. The worst recorded casualties before Stalingrad were 171 deaths suffered in combat in various villages along the Samara River. Lt. Tomljenović, Lt. Tomislav Anić and Lt. Ivan Malički were killed in action during this period.

On 24 September 1942, during a visit to the 6th Army headquarters, Pavelić decorated and promoted some soldiers of the regiment. Two days later, the 100th Jäger Division was committed to the Battle of Stalingrad.

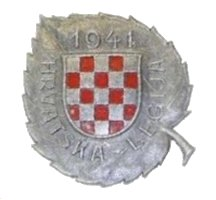
369th Legion Memorial badge

From that date, the number of legionnaires was reducing quickly, to a reported total of 1,403 altogether by 21 October 1942. New units from Croatia were not added except for returns of sick and wounded and a few officers and staff. A total of 22 (15%) officers were killed, 38 (26%) wounded, and 66 (45%) returned to Croatia from the original 147 Legion officers in total before fall. Only 20 officers, including Mesic, remained in Stalingrad and one is treated as MIA.

Lt. Bakarec, who was the first Legion soldier ever to receive the Iron Cross 2nd class, was later wounded at Stalingrad and evacuated to Croatia, where he was killed on 5 July 1944. Colonel and later NDH general Markulj was captured by the Allies, who extradited him to the Yugoslav army in summer 1945. Markulj was court-martialed, tried and executed in Belgrade in September 1945.

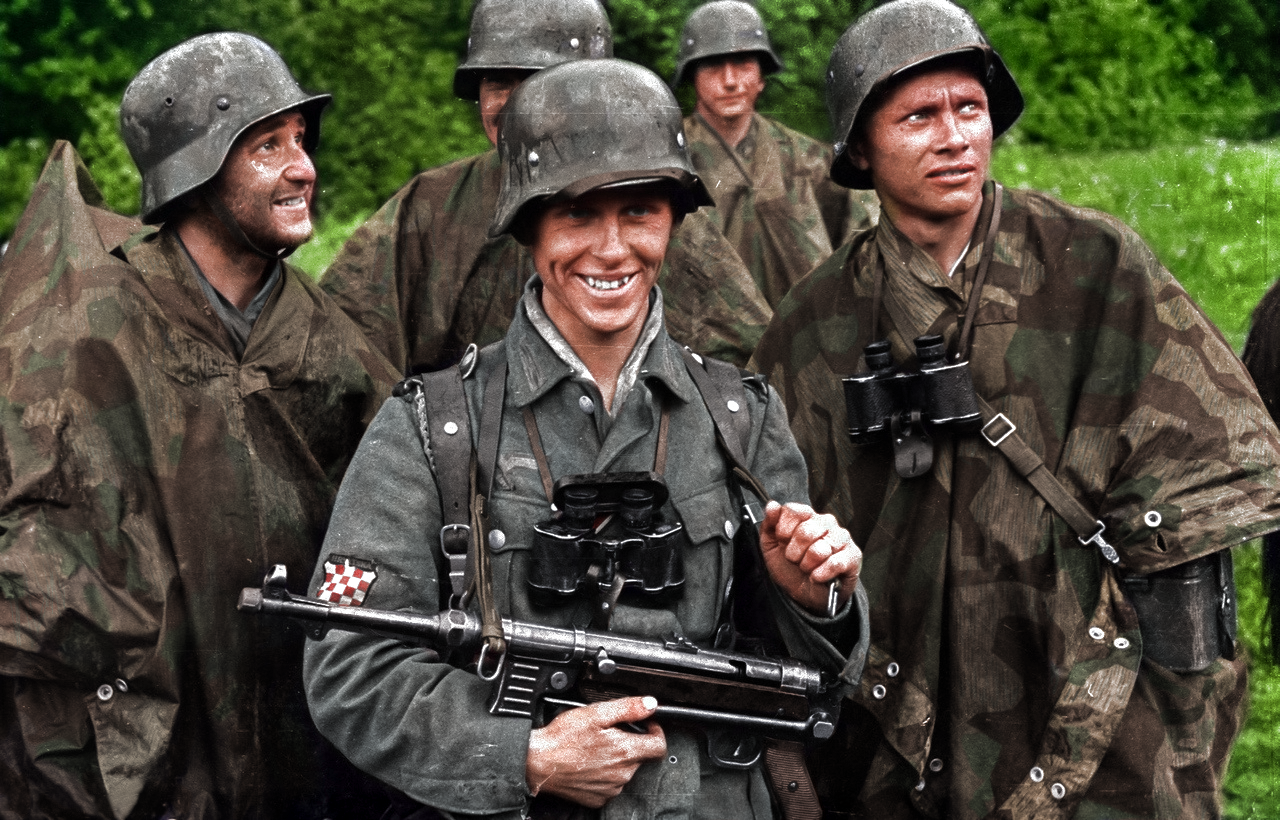
A squad of Regiment Legionaries, one of them poses for the camera

== Battle of Stalingrad ==
The 100th Jäger Division, including the 369th Croatian Reinforced Infantry Regiment, was involved in the heavy fighting for the "Red October" factory and for Mamayev Hill during the Battle of Stalingrad. By November 1942, the fighting in their sector had become a locked stalemate with little progress. By December 1942, the regiment had seen such intense combat that it was at a third of its strength. Despite the harsh conditions, the German high command credited the regiment with maintaining 'proper and military bearing'.

Sergeant Dragutin Podobnik was awarded Iron Cross Second and First Class and many Croat decorations, including one personally from Pavelic in September 1942 for his actions at Stalingrad. Pavicic ordered a strategic building to be captured in the Red October factory. However, the armored vehicle support was delayed. Sergeant Podobnik and his 18 men successfully captured the building without casualties and later transferred control to units from the German 54th Army Group. Sergeant Podobnik was later wounded and evacuated from Stalingrad and was killed in spring 1945 whilst serving in Pavelic's unit.

Several distinctions and citations are noted in war diaries and official military documents. There are several citations for bravery, valor, and leadership under fire for men of all ranks, including Lieutenant Rudolf Baričević. In addition, the regimental doctors received distinctions for their actions and success in saving lives. One notable citation is that of Captain Madraš, who was wounded and was to be flown out of Stalingrad but refused and instead stayed and fought with his men.

There were also acts of insubordination, dereliction of duty, and cowardly behavior cited in reports. Major Tomislav Brajkovic is noted to have attempted to keep morale and discipline high. However, due to major disagreements with other officers, including his commanding officer, he was transferred out of the regiment.

By January 14, the regiment’s front-line strength had dwindled to 90 active troops out of 200, facing severe cold, food shortages, and limited ammunition. Colonel Viktor Pavicic reportedly left a resignation letter and disappeared from the theatre permanently. He recommended Colonel Mesić to General Sanne to be his successor. General Sanne officially reported that Pavicic was a deserter, but Sgt. Erwin Juric claimed that Pavicic had received written orders signed by Sanne to leave Stalingrad by air on 15 January. During its last days at Stalingrad, the Legion desperately retrained about 700 inexperienced artillery and support soldiers for infantry combat duty. The last official report from January 21, 1943, counted 443 infantry and 444 artillery soldiers in Stalingrad. Just before the surrender of the 6th Army at the end of January, about 1,000 wounded were flown out, and of the remaining men in the regiment, nearly 900 became prisoners of war.

Among the last Wehrmacht soldiers to leave Stalingrad by air were a group of 18 wounded and sick Croat legionnaires, including Lt. Barićević, who were flown out by Luftwaffe pilots and were landed on the last serviceable German airfield at Stalingradskaja near the 369th's artillery section positions on the night of January 22nd to the 23rd, 1943. The evacuation also saved the regiment's war diary and other documents. Several Luftwaffe planes crashed the previous night while attempting takeoff and landing near Soviet-occupied areas, leading to a reduction in rescue missions. During the day of 23 January, Stalingradskaja airfield fell into Soviet hands.

The remaining elements of the regiment surrendered to Soviet General Vasiljev on January 29 or 30, 1943. In the three months between October 21, 1942, and January 21, 1943, they had lost 540 of 983 troops fighting for the Red October factory.

On 31 January 1943, General Friedrich Paulus announced the surrender of the German 6th Army. On 2 February, the Legion became Soviet prisoners of war, including all officers, approximately 100, mostly wounded, sick, and frostbitten combat soldiers, and some 600 other legionaries from artillery and support units. In the two weeks leading up to the capitulation, the 369th Regiment had lost 175 soldiers.

The Legion prisoners assembled at Beketovka on the river Volga, where they were joined by some 80,000 mainly German as well as Italian, Romanian and Hungarian POWs. They were sent on a forced march to Moscow, where they were joined by Croatian legionnaires from the Light Transport Brigade who had been attached to Italian forces on the Eastern Front. From there, they were sent to work camps in Siberia. A significant number of prisoners succumbed to starvation, hypothermia, or disease during the march.

== Regiment veterans ==
More than 1,000 legionnaires were evacuated from the Soviet Union and later Stalingrad by various means and for various reasons. They were awarded the Croatian Legion 1941 Linden Leaf for their service and formed the core of a new unit, the 369th (Croatian) Infantry Division.

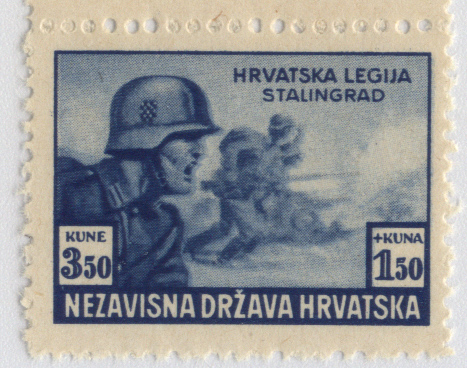
NDH Stamp issued for 369th Regiment

== Aftermath ==
In late October 1944, the Yugoslav Legion numbering about 3,000 operated as part of the Red Army around Čačak during the Belgrade Offensive. This unit was formed in early 1944 partly from former members of the 369th (Croatian) Reinforced Infantry Regiment. It was commanded by the former Ustaše Lieutenant Colonel Marko Mesić assisted by Captain Milutin Perišić, a Serb. Both officers were praised by Soviet general Sergey Biryuzov.

In the summer of 1943, one hundred legionaries and 6 officers, including Marko Mesić, were transferred to Suzdalj and later to Krasnogorsk near Moscow, where they met with most of the surviving Croat soldiers. At Krasnogorsk, the Soviets formed a new unit that utilized Royal Yugoslav uniforms (at the time, the Soviets did not recognize Tito's forces as a sovereign state). During early Soviet imprisonment, Col. Mesić appeared in Soviet media wearing a Royal Yugoslav Army uniform and Tito's flag. Upon news of this, the Ministry of the Armed Forces removed him from the Croatian Armed Forces and rescinded his awards.

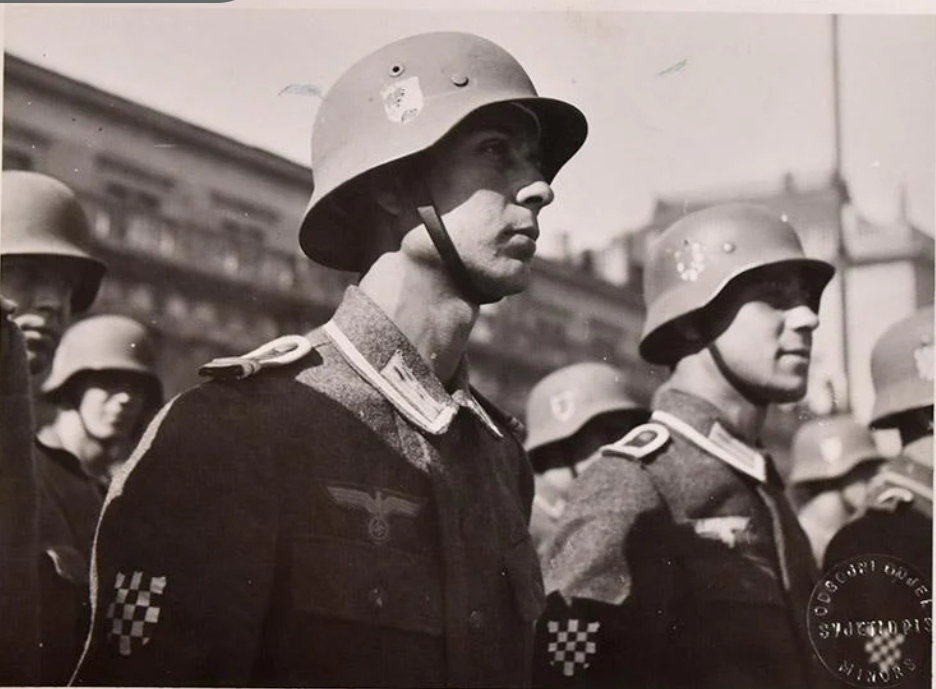
Croatian Legionaries of the 369th Reinforced regiment stand In line after returning to Croatia from the Eastern front

Col. Mesić was given command by the Soviets of this newly formed 1st Yugoslav Volunteer Brigade, assembled from Yugoslav prisoners of war and volunteers living in Russia at the time. During the first few months in captivity, Legionnaire numbers were reduced from some 700 to around 400 odd survivors or a 43% loss of life in under twelve months. The new Yugoslav partisan brigade, now wearing old Royal Yugoslav Army uniforms, was commanded by 369th Regiment Croat Legion officers like Lt.Col. Egon Zitnik, the former commander of the Light Transport Unit; Major Marijan Prislin, the former second in command of the 369. Regiment's artillery section; and Major Marijan Tulicic, the former artillery unit commander. As late as March 1944, they were joined by 200 more former 369th legionaries led by former 369th Stalingrad Doctor Bogoljub Modrijan and Lt. Vlahov, Lt. Tahtamišimov, Lt. Draženović and Lt. Ivan Vadlja, who was wounded at Stalingrad but missed the last flight out. They were transported to Yugoslavia in late 1944 under direct orders from Tito, where they suffered high casualties in combat.

== Commanders ==
- Colonel Ivan Markulj
- Lieutenant-Colonel Ivan Babić
- Colonel Viktor Pavičić
- Lieutenant-Colonel Marko Mesić

== See also ==
- Croatian Air Force Legion
- Croatian Naval Legion
- Independent State of Croatia during World War II
- World War II in Yugoslavia

== Sources ==
=== Books ===
- Davis, Brian (2012). Flags of the Third Reich (2): Waffen-SS. Oxford: Osprey Publishing. ISBN 978-1-78096-536-9.
- Muller, Rolf-Dieter (2012). The Unknown Eastern Front: The Wehrmacht and Hitler's Foreign Soldiers. New York: I.B. Tauris. ISBN 978-1-78076-072-8.
- Šaković, Edin (2009). "Gračanlije u oružanim snagama NDH i njemačkim legionarskim jedinicama 1941.- 1945. i njihova stradanja" [People of Gračanica in the armed forces of NDH and German legionnaire units in 1941-1945. and their casualties]. Gračanički glasnik - Časopis za kulturnu historiju (in Bosnian) (29). Izdavačka kuća »Monos« d.o.o: 58–76.
- Stahel, D. (2018). Joining Hitler's Crusade. Cambridge University Press. ISBN 978-1-316-51034-6.
- Tomasevich, Jozo (1975). War and Revolution in Yugoslavia, 1941-1945: The Chetniks. Vol. 1. San Francisco: Stanford University Press. ISBN 0-8047-0857-6.
- Tomasevich, Jozo (2001). War and Revolution in Yugoslavia, 1941-1945: Occupation and Collaboration. Vol. 2. San Francisco: Stanford University Press. ISBN 0-8047-3615-4.
- Heroji za pogrešnu stvar: Bačeni na Staljingrad, Jutarnji list, 24. veljače 2008.
- Milan Pojić Hrvatska pukovnija 369. na Istočnom bojištu 1941. - 1943.
- Welz H. Verratene Grenadiere. — Berlin, Deutscher Militärverlag, 1965
