= Beketovka =

Village in the Astrakhan administrative district, Russia

Beketovka Бекетовка
- Selo
- Location within Astrakhan Oblast Location within Russia
- Coordinates: 46°05′N 47°45′E
- Country: Russia
- Region: Astrakhan Oblast
- District: Ikryaninsky District
- Time zone: UTC+4:00

Beketovka (Russian: Бекетовка) is a rural locality (a selo) in Mayachninsky Selsoviet of Ikryaninsky District, Astrakhan Oblast, Russia. The population was 393 as of 2010. There are 3 streets.

== Geography ==
Beketovka is located 1.8 km east of Ikryanoye (the district's administrative centre) by road. Ikryanoye is the nearest rural locality.

Moreover Beketovka is located at approximately 350 km to the southeast of Volgograd and 50 km to the southwest of Astrakhan.
