= Novo-Bulgary =

Novo-Bulgary Ново-Булгары
- Selo
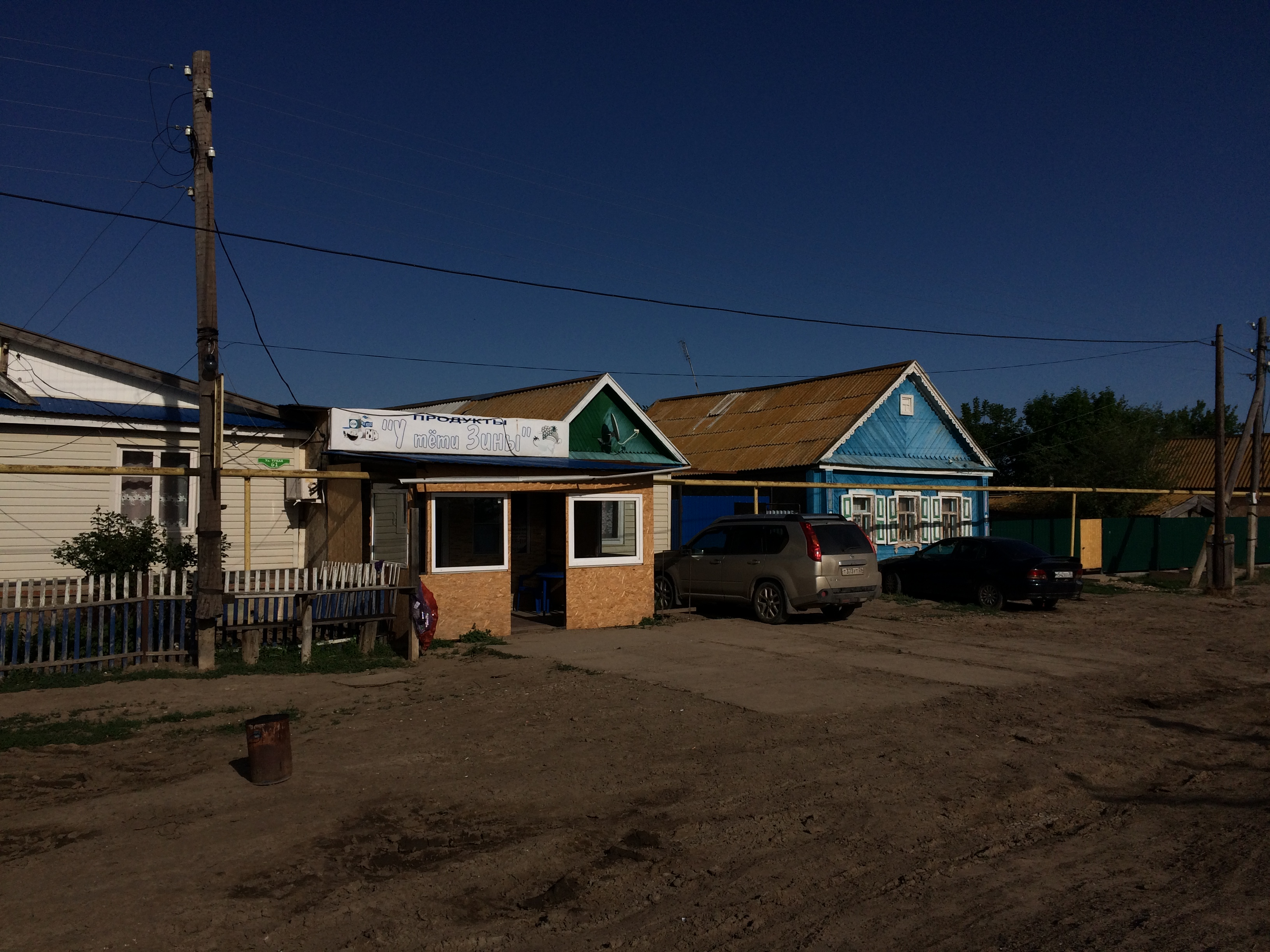

- Location within Astrakhan Oblast Location within Russia
- Coordinates: 46°09′N 47°49′E
- Country: Russia
- Region: Astrakhan Oblast
- District: Ikryaninsky District
- Time zone: UTC+4:00

Novo-Bulgary (Russian: Ново-Булгары, Tatar: Яңа Болгар, romanized: Yaña Bolğar) is a rural locality (a selo) and the administrative center of Novo-Bulgarinsky Selsoviet in Ikryaninsky District, Astrakhan Oblast, Russia. The population was 489 as of 2010, mostly being Bulgar Tatars. There are 12 streets.

== History ==
At the beginning of the 20th century, a group of Volga Tatars moved to Astrakhan, working as farm laborers to wealthy yurt dwellers. In 1918, they united and founded their own village, Novo-Bulgary

== Geography ==
Novo-Bulgary is located 24 km northeast of Ikryanoye (the district's administrative centre) by road. Bakhtemir is the nearest rural locality.
