= Yamnoye, Ikryaninsky District, Astrakhan Oblast =

Yamnoye Ямное
- Selo
- Location within Astrakhan Oblast Location within Russia
- Coordinates: 45°59′N 47°42′E
- Country: Russia
- Region: Astrakhan Oblast
- District: Ikryaninsky District
- Time zone: UTC+4:00

Yamnoye (Russian: Ямное) is a rural locality (a selo) in Mayachninsky Selsoviet, Ikryaninsky District, Astrakhan Oblast, Russia. The population was 461 as of 2010. There are 11 streets.

== Geography ==
Yamnoye is located 15 km south of Ikryanoye (the district's administrative centre) by road. Mayachnoye is the nearest rural locality.
