= Military Order of the Iron Trefoil =

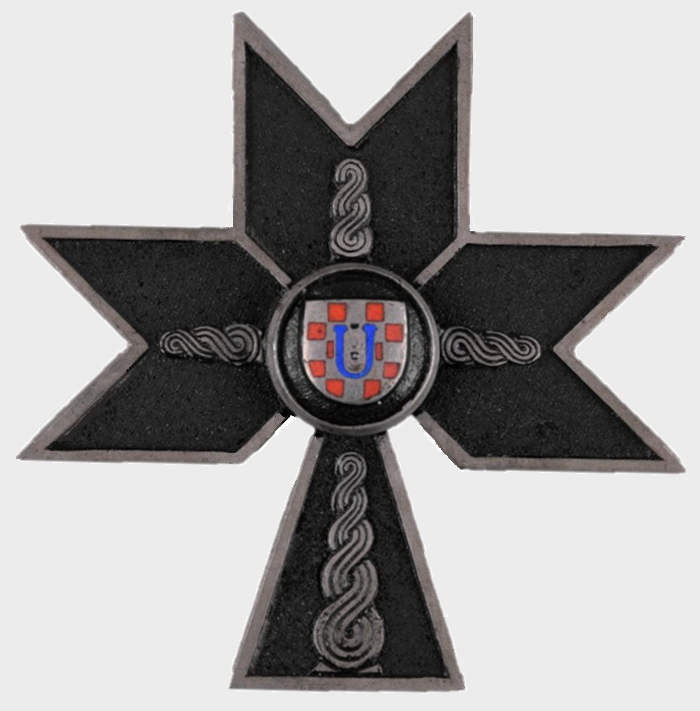
- Order of the Iron Trefoil 2nd Class
- Type: Military Order
- Awarded for: "particularly successful actions against the enemy"
- Presented by: Independent State of Croatia
- Eligibility: Military Personnel
- Status: dissolved
- Established: 27 December 1941

Highlights
- Total: 968
- Total recipients: Ante Pavelić; Artur Phleps; Slavko Kvaternik

The Military Order of the Iron Trefoil, also known as the Croatian Cross, was the highest military decoration of the Independent State of Croatia. It was awarded for "acts of war, achieved by personal incentive, for efforts and good leadership in ventures, which had remarkable success against the enemy."

The Order had four classes: the 1st Class is worn on a ribbon around the neck, 2nd Class without the ribbon on the left chest, 3rd Class on ribbon on buttonhole, and the 4th Class on triangular ribbon on left chest. For exceptional merits the Order was awarded with Oak Branches. The recipients of the 1st and 2nd Class had the right to the title "Vitez" (Knight).

The Military Order of the Iron Trefoil was awarded rarely. The only holder of the 1st Class with Oak Branches was the Poglavnik Dr. Ante Pavelić, and the 1st Class order was awarded to only two high-ranking Croatian officers, one of them being NDH Vojskovođa and former Austro-Hungarian Colonel Slavko Kvaternik.

== Holders of the Military Order of the Iron Trefoil ==
=== 1st Class with Oak Branches ===
Only one holder:

- Ante Pavelić, Poglavnik of the Independent State of Croatia
- (Awarded, but not presented to, Generalfeldmarschall (field marshal) Friedrich Paulus)

=== 1st Class ===
Seven holders:

- Rafael Boban, general of the Croatian Armed Forces
- Paul Dahm (de), Sturmbannführer
- Walter Stettner Ritter von Grabenhofen, Generalleutnant of the Heer
- Hans-Joachim Gravenstein, Generalmajor and commander of the 373rd (Croatian) Infantry Division
- Slavko Kvaternik, Vojskovođa and commander of the Domobarnstvo
- Vjekoslav Luburić, general of the Croatian Armed Forces
- Artur Phleps, Obergruppenführer of the Waffen SS
- Werner Sanne, Generalleutnant of the Heer

=== 2nd Class with Oak Branches ===
Five holders

=== 2nd Class ===
Twelve holders:

- Colonel Marko Mesić
- August Schmidhuber, SS-Brigadeführer und Generalmajor der Waffen-SS
- Konrad von Leipzig, Rittmeister Küstenjäger-Abteilung "Brandenburg", Panzergrenadier-Division "Brandenburg", Heer (1919 -1945)

=== 3rd Class with Oak Branches ===
Fifty holders

=== 3rd Class ===
Sixty-four holders:

- Mato Dukovac, First lieutenant of the Croatian Air Force; Croatian fighter ace with the most victories
- Jure Francetić, colonel and commander of the Black Legion
- Franjo Šimić, general of the Croatian Armed Forces
- Horst Weber, Schnellboot commander in the Kriegsmarine – awarded 11 May 1944

=== 4th Class with Oak Branches ===
256 holders, including Colonel Eduard Bunić and Mato Dukovac

=== 4th Class ===
577 holders

== Provision ==
1. Military Order of the Iron Trefoil is founded, Order serves as a visible sign of decoration for particularly successful actions against the enemy.
2. The Master of the order of the Poglavnik of the Independent State of Croatia.
3. Order of Iron Trefoil is the highest military order of the Independent State of Croatia, and it is rewarded for the acts of war, achieved by personal incentive, for efforts and good leadership in ventures, which had remarkable success against the enemy.
4. The Order confers on officers, NCOs and Home Guards, and Ustashas of Croatian Armed Forces.
  Members of allied or friendly armed forces, who successfully fought to achieve independence of the Croatian State, or who later fought shoulder to shoulder with the Croatian detachments, may also be awarded with this Order.
5. Sign of the Order was made in the form of the Croatian Trefoil of black iron with a narrow silver edge. The ribs of the leaves are made of silver triple wattle ornament. In the middle of Trefoil is located Croatian coat of arms with the Ustasha symbol (the letter "U" in blue, and it burst with a flame). On the reverse of the Trefoil there is inscription in the middle: "ZA DOM SPREMNI" (Ready for home), above the inscription is "10 IV." and below is "1941." For exceptional merit to any Class can be added two green Oak Branches, which will frame the Croatian coat of arms. Order of the 1st and 2nd Class is rewarded for special military acts, which need to be tested and confirmed by special military commission.
6. Order has four Classes, namely:
  1. First Class, height and width of Trefoil is 52mm, a diameter of the extent in the middle is 13mm; it is worn around the neck on the prescribed ribbon;
  2. Second Class, designed as the First Class, it is worn without ribbon on left chest;
  3. Third Class, height and width is 42mm, a diameter of extent in the middle is 12mm; it is carried on the ribbon on the buttonhole;
  4. Fourth Class, designed as the Third Class; it is worn on triangular ribbon on left chest.
    The ribbon is red with white edge on each side; the width of whole ribbon is 40mm and 6mm of white edge.
1. Holders of the 1st and 2nd Class have right on title "vitez" (knight).
2. The Order is awarded by Poglavnik by a charter.
3. Unauthorized wearing of the order is punishable by judicial imprisonment up to month or a fine up to 50.000 Kunas.
4. The implementation of these legislative provisions is entrusted to the Head of Department of Decorations in Poglavnik's Office, and he will issue regulation on awarding and carrying the Order.
5. This provision will be in legal power on the day of proclamation in the Official Gazette.

Zagreb, 27 December 1941.

Polavnik of the
Independent State of Croatia
Dr. ANTE PAVELIĆ v. R.

Number CDLXIII - 2167-Z-1941.
Minister of Justice and Religion:
Dr. MIRKO PUK, v. R.

== See also ==
- Order of the Croatian Trefoil
