= Krasnye Barrikady =

Urban locality in Astrakhan Oblast, Russia

Coordinates: 46°12′17″N 47°51′23″E

Krasnye Barrikady (Russian: Красные Баррикады) is an urban locality (work settlement) in Ikryaninsky District of Astrakhan Oblast, Russia. Population: 6,488 (2010 census); 6,304 (2002 census); 6,184 (1989 Soviet census).
