= Medal of Poglavnik Ante Pavelić for Bravery =

- Type: Medal
- Awarded for: "acts of personal bravery in combat"
- Presented by: Independent State of Croatia
- Eligibility: Military Personnel
- Status: dissolved
- Established: 27 December 1941
- Final award: 1945

Highlights
- Total recipients: Eduard Bunić

Medal of Poglavnik Ante Pavelić for Bravery (Croatian: Kolajna poglavnika Ante Pavelića za hrabrost) is founded as a "visible sign of decoration for acts of personal bravery in combat". Poglavnik of Croatia has awarded with this medal officers, NCOs and soldiers of Croatian Armed Forces who showed personal bravery in combat. It was possible that medal be awarded to members of foreign armed forces, and those members were needed to be involved in combat along with Croatian soldiers. Medal for bravery had four grades:

Golden medal for bravery It was worn on unusual created ribbon which hung from the second upper button. Holder of the Golden medal for bravery had right on title "Knight" ("Vitez"). Golden medal for bravery was awarded to only seven persons and five of them was awarded posthumous. Also, two Golden medals for bravery were awarded to flags of two Croatian units.

Great silver medal for bravery It was worn on triangle ribbon which hung on the left chest.

Croatian citizens, which have been awarded with Great silver or Golden bravery medal had monthly allowance. There was also Small silver medal and Bronze medal of Poglavnik Ante Pavelić for bravery which were massively awarded.

Creator of this medal is famous Croatian sculptor Ivo Kerdić.

== Recipients ==
=== Golden Medal for bravery ===
Ten medals were awarded:

- Artillery Lance Sergeant Marijan Banovac
- Ustaša Captain Mijo Babić
- Ustaša Colonel Jure Francetić
- Infantry Major Juraj Bobinac
- Ustaša Major Krunoslav Devčić
- Air Force 2nd Lieutenant and ace Mato Dukovac
- Air Force Lieutenant Cvitan Galić
- General Eduard Bona-Bunić
- Kladanj Battalion
- 369th Croatian Reinforced Infantry Regiment

== Sources ==
Hrvatska odlikovanja (mr. sc. Stjepan Adanić, general-bojnik Krešimir Kašpar, prof. Boris Prister, prof. Ivan Ružić)
