= Mato Dukovac =

Croatian World War II flying ace

- Dukovac in front of his Messerschmitt Bf 109 in the Soviet Union
- Born: 23 September 1918; Surčin, Croatia-Slavonia, Austria-Hungary
- Died: 6 June 1990 (aged 71); Toronto, Ontario, Canada
- Military career
- Allegiance: Kingdom of Yugoslavia (1937–1941); Independent State of Croatia (1941–1944); Nazi Germany (1941–1944); DF Yugoslavia (1944–1945); Syrian Republic (1946–1948)
- Branch: Royal Yugoslav Air Force; Croatian Air Force; Luftwaffe; Yugoslav Air Force; Syrian Air Force
- Service years: 1937–1945; 1946–1948
- Rank: Poručnik
- Conflicts: World War II; Invasion of Yugoslavia; Eastern Front; 1948 Arab–Israeli War

Mato Dukovac (23 September 1918 – 6 June 1990) was the leading Croatian fighter ace of World War II, credited with between 40 and 44 confirmed victories. He joined the Air Force of the Independent State of Croatia following the Axis invasion of Yugoslavia in April 1941, and then the Luftwaffe, with which he flew combat missions on the Eastern Front. His tours of the Eastern Front spanned October and November 1942, February to June 1943, and October 1943 to March 1944. He defected to the Soviet Union on 20 September 1944 and was returned to Yugoslavia in November 1944. He worked as a flight instructor for the Yugoslav Air Force in Pančevo and Zadar before defecting to Italy in April 1945.

Dukovac left Italy in 1946 and became a captain in the Syrian Air Force. During the 1948 Arab–Israeli War, he flew combat missions against Israel. Following the war, he emigrated to Canada and started a family there. He died in Toronto in 1990.

== Early life ==
Dukovac was born on 23 September 1918 in the town of Surčin, near Zemun, then part of the Kingdom of Croatia-Slavonia, Austria-Hungary. (Note: Gol gives his date of birth as 23 October 1918, but this is contradicted by the date given on his gravestone.) He was an avid glider pilot before he entered the 67th class of the Royal Yugoslav Military Academy in Belgrade in 1937. He graduated on 1 April 1940 with the rank of potporučnik, (Note: Equivalent to a U.S. Army second lieutenant.) and commenced pilot training at the 1st Pilot School in Pančevo in October of that year.

== World War II ==
=== Croatian Air Force Legion ===
During the German-led Axis invasion of Yugoslavia in April 1941, Dukovac served with the 2nd Squadron of the Royal Yugoslav Air Force (Serbo-Croatian: Vazduhoplovstvo Vojske Kraljevine Jugoslavije, VVKJ) at an airfield in Velika Gorica. After the Kingdom of Yugoslavia was defeated and occupied by the Axis powers, Dukovac became a member of the armed forces of the newly created Independent State of Croatia (Croatian: Nezavisna Država Hrvatska, NDH). He joined the Air Force of the Independent State of Croatia (Croatian: Zrakoplovstvo Nezavisne Države Hrvatske, ZNDH) on 29 April 1941 with the rank of poručnik, (Note: Equivalent to a U.S. Army first lieutenant.) and was initially posted to the personnel department of ZNDH headquarters.

On 27 June 1941, the Croatian Legion (Croatian: Hrvatska Legija) was formed to fight alongside Germany during its invasion of the Soviet Union, and on 12 July the air component of the Legion was formed. Known as the Croatian Air Force Legion (Croatian: Hrvatska Zrakoplovna Legija, HZL) it consisted of a bomber group and a fighter group. The HZL formed part of the German Luftwaffe; its members swore an oath of loyalty to Adolf Hitler, were subject to German disciplinary regulations, and wore Luftwaffe uniforms. After attending Luftwaffe training schools, the fighter group was sent to the Eastern Front and designated as 15. (Kroatische) Staffel (squadron) of III. Gruppe (Group) of Jagdgeschwader 52 (52nd Fighter Wing, or JG 52). Meanwhile, Dukovac was transferred to the Luftwaffe Flugzeugführerschule A/B 120 (pilot school 120) in Prenzlau, Germany in September or October. In April 1942 he underwent advanced training, and in June he was transferred to Jagdfliegerschule 4 (fighter pilot school 4) at Fürth. In October 1942, Leutnant Dukovac and seven other pilots joined 15./JG 52, which was operating in the Caucasus flying Messerschmitt Bf 109G-2 fighters. On 29 October, Dukovac had his first 15-minute familiarisation flight, and by the afternoon of that day the new members of the unit were flying as wingmen to the veteran pilots of the Staffel.

=== First victory ===
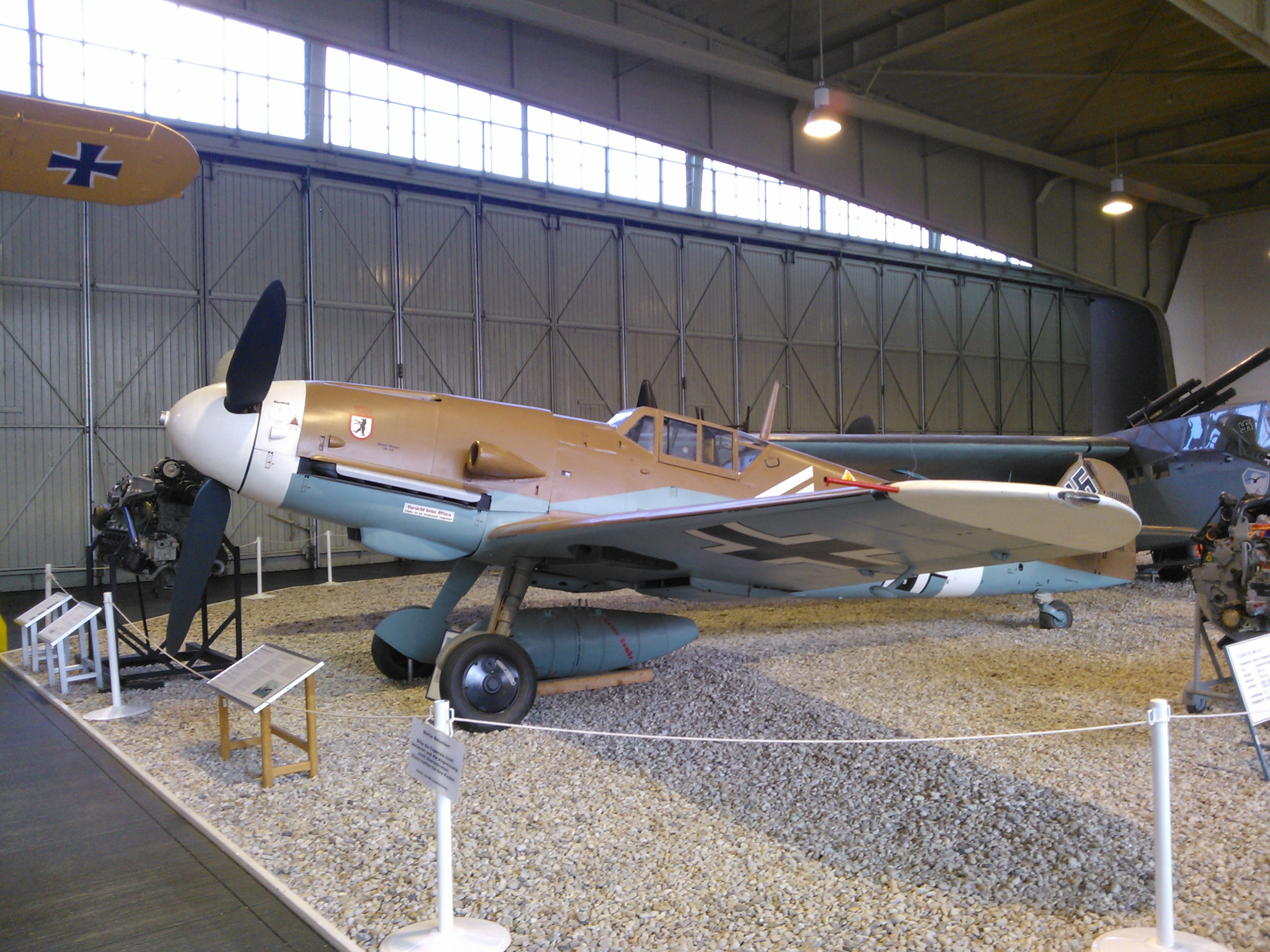
Dukovac scored his first aerial victory flying a Messerschmitt Bf 109G-2 fighter.

On 11 November 1942, Dukovac was flying his 12th mission, escorting Junkers Ju 87 Stuka dive bombers to Lazarevskoye. During the mission, he and his companion were intercepted by Polikarpov I-16 Rata fighters, and Dubovac downed one of the attackers over the city of Tuapse to register his first confirmed aerial victory. Dukovac was unable to build upon his success at this time, as four days later the whole Staffel rotated back to the NDH because most of the personnel had endured a year of constant combat. The men of 15./JG 52 had a break of three months, commencing their return journey on 12 February 1943, collecting their aircraft at Kraków in German-occupied Poland on 18 February then flying to Lvov. They flew on to Nikolayev on 21 February. The Eastern Front had changed significantly during their absence, with the strategic initiative passing to the Soviets.

=== Second tour ===
On 30 March 1943, 15./JG 52 transferred from Nikolayev to Kerch, and it flew the first missions of its second tour the following day. On 15 April, Dukovac and Feldwebel Viktor Mihelčić took off on a patrol of the Krymskaja–Abinskaja area, and Dukovac shot down a US-made Bell P-39 Airacobra. Five days later, Dukovac was late taking off and was catching up to his Schwarm when he downed a LaGG-3 fighter during an engagement with four of the Soviet aircraft, but there were no witnesses to confirm his claim. Later that day, he and three other pilots were escorting a group of Ju 87s and Junkers Ju 88 medium bombers when they came across 25 Soviet fighters and flying boats over the Black Sea. Dukovac claimed another LaGG-3, but again no-one witnessed it. The following morning, Dukovac was on patrol with another pilot near Karbardinovka when they came across six Mikoyan-Gurevich MiG-3 fighters. Dukovac claimed one, but the other pilot's aircraft was hit and they had to retire. Later that day, Dukovac and another pilot engaged several LaGG-3s between Novorossiysk and Gelendzhik; Dukovac claimed two, one of which was not witnessed. On 22 April, Dukovac was attacking shipping in Novorossiysk when he had to force-land his aircraft with engine problems. He flew another mission in a different aircraft later that day over the Black Sea, downing an Ilyushin DB-3 bomber.

On 25 April, Dukovac and two others flew an escort mission for Henschel Hs 129 ground-attack aircraft and Focke-Wulf Fw 190 fighters attacking shipping near Primorsko-Akhtarsk, during which the Croat pilots assisted in the sinking of two small vessels. On 27 April, Dukovac accounted for another LaGG-3 between Krymskaja and Abinskaja during a Heinkel He 111 escort. Dukovac claimed a victory over another LaGG-3 during a patrol three days later, but it was not seen by his wingman, as they had become separated during the fight. On 1 May, Dukovac sank a small vessel. The following day, he and three other Croat pilots were escorting a group of He 111s when two LaGG-3s tried to intercept the formation. Dukovac and another pilot both claimed to have downed one Soviet fighter each, but their destruction was not witnessed. On 3 May, a morning mission saw Dukovac claim one of four LaGG-3s encountered near Krimskaja.

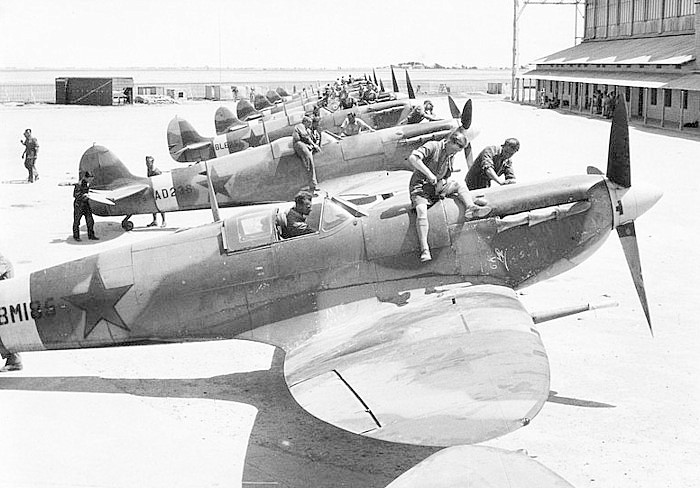
On 25 May, Dukovac claimed victories over two Supermarine Spitfire V fighters

In the afternoon of 3 May, Dukovac and another pilot were escorting Hs 129s when they encountered a group of seven Ilyushin Il-2 ground attack aircraft and six fighters. During the engagement, Dukovac's aircraft was damaged and he force-landed, but not before claiming one of the Il-2s. The following morning, Dukovac and two others sortied on a He 111 escort mission, after which Dukovac again force-landed, this time near Varenikovskaya. On 5 May, Dukovac made three claims: two LaGG-3s in the morning, and another during a Ju 87 escort mission in the evening. The following evening, Dukovac shot down another LaGG-3 while escorting Ju 87s. On 8 May, he claimed yet another LaGG-3 during an escort mission for a Fieseler Fi 156 Storch liaison aircraft. On 12 May, reinforcements arrived for 15./JG 52, in the form of some of the pilots that had served on the first tour of the Eastern Front in 1942, along with more former VVKJ pilots.

Dukovac did not meet further success until 25 May, when he claimed two Supermarine Spitfire V fighters southeast of Temryuk. Two days later, he and two other pilots surprised eight LaGG-3s west of Trarehof, all of them claiming one, although Dukovac's claim was not witnessed. On 30 May, he was on another He 111 escort mission when he accounted for another LaGG-3. At this juncture, there was a spate of defections from 15./JG 52, with pilots flying to Soviet airfields. The remaining pilots were questioned by the Luftwaffe, the Staffel was withdrawn from the front, and the commander of the HZL was replaced. This was the end of the second tour of 15./JG 52 on the Eastern Front, during which Dukovac had claimed 14 confirmed and six unconfirmed kills, five of which were later confirmed.

=== Third tour ===
The Luftwaffe decided to replace most of the remaining pilots of 15./JG 52 with newly trained men, and several veterans of the Staffel joined them during their fighter training at Fürth. Twelve graduated on 1 October 1943, and under newly promoted Staffelkapitan Oberleutnant Dukovac, they and another two pilots arrived at Nikolayev on 21 October, where they were equipped with eight Bf 109G-4s and G-6s. They deployed to their airfield at Bagerovo and commenced combat missions on 26 October. Three days later, Dukovac scored the first victory of the tour by downing a LaGG-3 south of Kerch. Over the next two days, he claimed an Il-2 and another LaGG-3, then a Ju 87. 1 November was the most successful day for 15./JG 52 for the entire war, with pilots claiming eleven aircraft with no loss, including two Il-2s for Dukovac. He claimed another two Il-2s the next day, but his aircraft was badly damaged by the escorting fighters and he crash-landed near Mariental, escaping unhurt. He followed this up with a claim for a DB-3 on 6 November. On 15 November, the Staffel moved to Karankut, and four days later Dukovac downed yet another LaGG-3. At the end of November, the approach of winter reduced flying operations almost to a halt, but Dukovac downed two Il-2s on 6 December near Bagerovo for his 30th and 31st confirmed aerial victories.

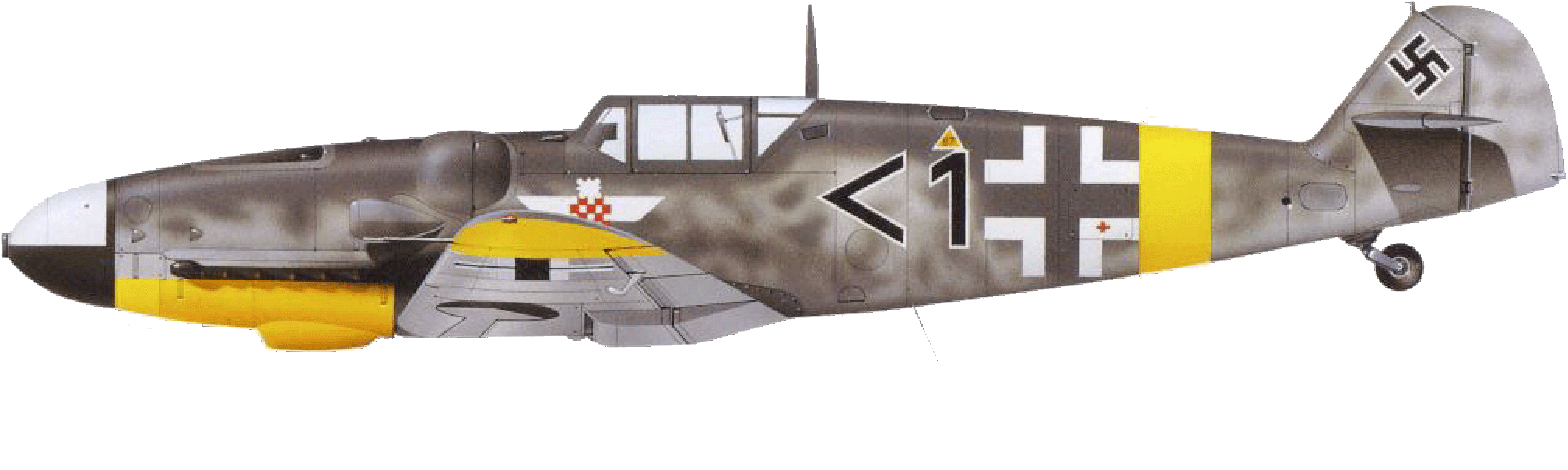
Bf 109G-6 'Black Chevron 1' of Oberleutenant Mato Dukovac, November 1943. Dukovac used this aircraft until he was shot down in it by a Soviet P-39 on 25 February 1944.

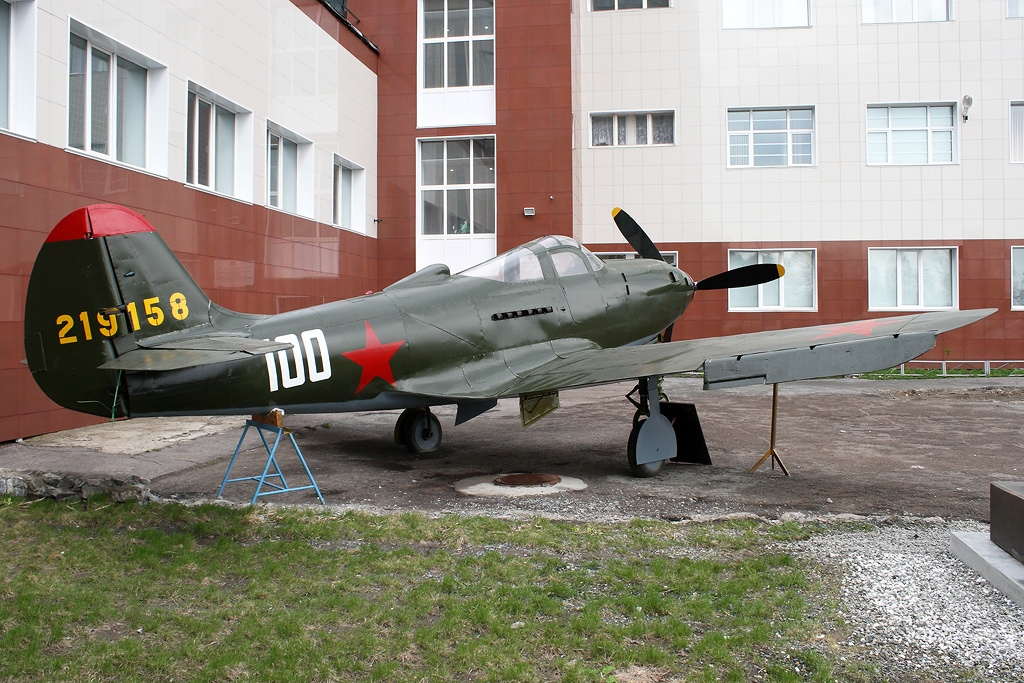
Dukovac's last aerial victory was against a US-made P-39 Airacobra

It was not until 12 January that Dukovac added to his tally, a Yakovlev Yak-1. On 25 February, Dukovac flew five sorties. On the first, he and his wingman downed a Yak-1 each, and on the second he shot down a Yak and a P-39. During his fifth mission, he was shot down by P-39s and crash-landed, injuring his spine. He was evacuated to a field hospital but returned to 15./JG 52 as soon as he could walk, ten days later, only to find that he had just three pilots fit for duty. Despite the pending arrival of newly trained pilots, the loss of another two pilots by mid-March led the Luftwaffe to decide that attempting to maintain 15./JG 52 was futile, and the men were sent home to the NDH. During its three tours, the Staffel had accounted for a total of 297 Soviet aircraft, of which Dukovac had 37 confirmed and eight unconfirmed aerial victories, seven of which were later confirmed. At the beginning of July, the Luftwaffe reconsidered its decision, and the newly promoted Hauptmann Dukovac and a group of veteran and fresh pilots began to make their way back to the Eastern Front. They were transported to Romania and then the Slovak Republic, but no aircraft were provided, and on 21 July the pilots were advised that the HZL was to be disbanded. Despite this, in August, they were moved to an airfield in East Prussia, where they took delivery of ten Bf 109G-14s. At the beginning of September, they flew to Lithuania in preparation to rejoin the fray.

=== Defections ===
On 20 September 1944, Dukovac and another pilot defected to the Soviets after taking off from Labjau airfield in East Prussia. His defection was soon announced by the Red Army. This spelled the end of the Staffel, and the remaining members were withdrawn to East Prussia and retrained as infantry. These men were eventually released from infantry duties in early 1945 and were allowed to return to the NDH, where they were assigned to the ZNDH. In November 1944, the Soviets handed Dukovac over to the Yugoslav Partisans, who offered him the position of flight instructor with the Yugoslav Air Force (Serbo-Croatian: Jugoslovensko ratno vazduhoplovstvo, JRV). The following month, Dukovac returned to Belgrade as a kapetan in the JRV, and after a conversion to fly Yakovlev fighters, he worked as a flight instructor in Pančevo. By February 1945, constant provocations and insults directed at him by fellow JRV personnel owing to his service with the ZNDH prompted him to apply for a transfer. In April, he was posted to the 1st Pilot Training School in Zadar as an instructor.

On 8 August, Dukovac commandeered a de Havilland Tiger Moth biplane, flew it across the Adriatic and defected again, this time to the Kingdom of Italy. He was first placed in a refugee camp in Modena, and then one in Bagnoli del Trigno.

== Later life and legacy ==
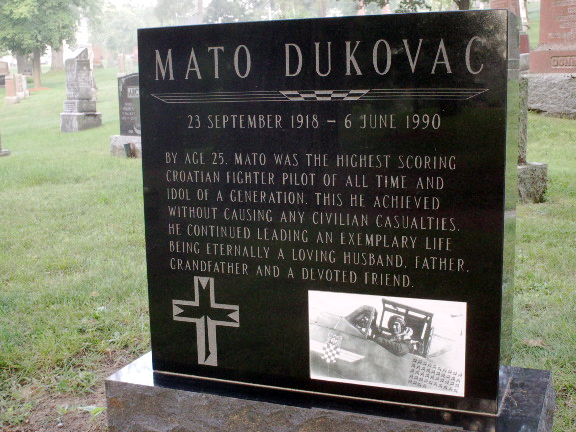
Dukovac's grave in Kingston, Ontario

In Italy Dukovac was recruited by a Syrian official who had served in the Wehrmacht during the war. Along with four other Croatian pilots, he received a Syrian passport and relocated to Damascus in late 1947. During the 1948 Arab–Israeli War, he was a captain in No. 1 Squadron of the Syrian Air Force, based in Estabal in Lebanon's Beqaa Valley. On 14 July 1948, Dukovac carried out a bombing raid on Israeli targets in Galilee. He left before the war ended and emigrated to Canada. He settled in Toronto and started a family there. He worked for IBM and was a co-founder of one of the largest Croatian émigré organisations in Canada, the United Croats of Canada. He died in Toronto on 6 June 1990. (Note: Gol gives his date of death as September 1990, but this is contradicted by the date given on his gravestone.)

Dukovac was the top-scoring Croatian pilot of World War II. During his life, there was much controversy surrounding the exact number of aircraft that he had downed. Croatian wartime documents discovered in the Military History Institute in Belgrade after his death show that the ZNDH credited him with 44 confirmed kills. At least one other source indicates a tally of 40 confirmed kills with five unconfirmed. The ZNDH total of 44 included 18 LaGG-3s, 12 Ilyushin Il-2s, three P-39s, two DB-3s, two Yak-1s, and one each of the following aircraft; II-16, MiG-3, Spitfire, La-5, Yak-9, Pe-2, and A-20. The ZNDH records also noted one unconfirmed claim.

== Decorations ==
- Medal of Poglavnik Ante Pavelić for Bravery
- Medal of the Crown of King Zvonimir
- Military Order of the Iron Trefoil (received 3rd and 4th class)
- German Cross
- Iron Cross
  - 1st Class
  - 2nd Class
