= Eduard Bunić =

Eduard Bunić, also Eduard Bona-Bunić (1894 – 2 October 1944 in Travnik) was a Croatian World War II soldier and member of the Bunić family, an old Croatian and Austro-Hungarian noble family.

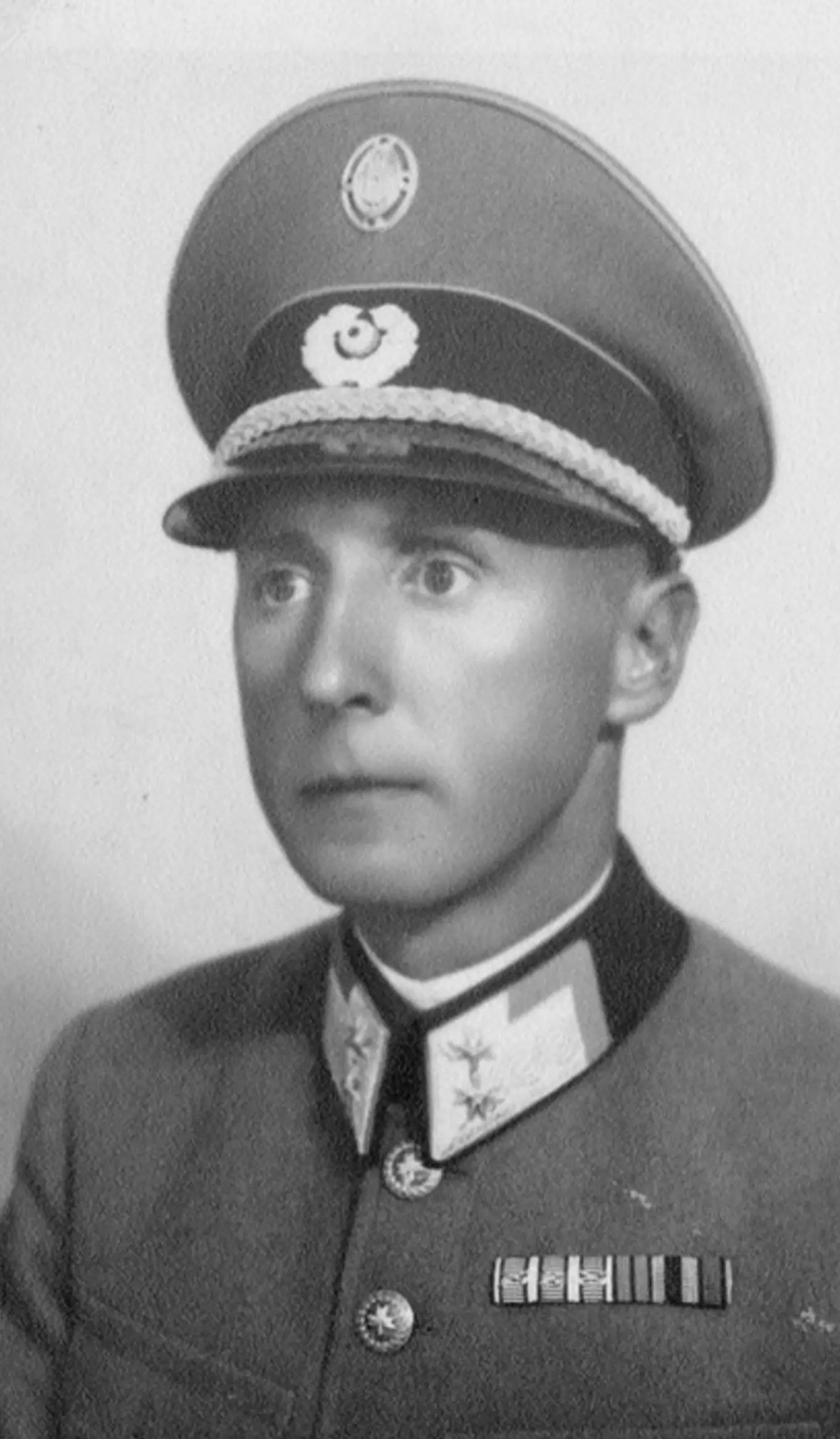
Eduard Bunić In Homeguard uniform

Bunić served as pukovnik konjanički (colonel of cavalry) in the Croatian Home Guard. From September 1943 he was in command of the II. konjanički sklop (II. Cavalry Group). He later joined the Brzi zdrug (Mobile Brigade), and commanded the unit at the defense of Travnik. Yugoslav Partisans took the town, resulting in Bunić leading one last defense which resulted in his death on 2 October 1944.

In 1943, Bunić was decorated with the Military Order of the Iron Trefoil Fourth Class and the Order of the Crown of King Zvonimir Third Class. He was posthumously promoted to general and awarded the Golden Ante Pavelić Medal for Bravery.
