= Willibald Utz =

German general of World War II

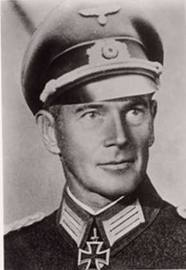
- Colonel Utz
- Born: 20 January 1893; Furth im Wald, Kingdom of Bavaria, German Empire
- Died: 20 April 1954 (aged 61); Bad Reichenhall, Bavaria, West Germany
- Burial place: Saint Zeno Cemetery
- Relatives: ∞ 10 December 1952 Elvira Pfeiffer, née Soutschek (1896–1982)
- Military career
- Allegiance: Kingdom of Bavaria; German Empire; Weimar Republic; Nazi Germany
- Branch: Bavarian Army; Imperial German Army; Reichsheer; German Army
- Service years: 1913–1945
- Rank: Generalleutnant
- Nickname: Willy
- Commands: 100th Gebirgsjäger Regiment; 100th Jäger Division; 2nd Mountain Division
- Conflicts: World War I World War II: Invasion of Poland; Battle of France; Balkan Campaign; Battle of Crete; Siege of Leningrad; Hube's Pocket; Battle of the Dukla Pass; Siegfried Line Campaign
- Awards: Knight's Cross of the Iron Cross

Willibald "Willy" Johann Sebastian Utz (20 January 1893 – 20 April 1954) was a German general during World War II who commanded several divisions. He was a recipient of the Knight's Cross of the Iron Cross.

== Life and career ==
Willibald Utz was born in Furth im Wald in Bavaria on 20 January 1893. On 1 October 1913, at the age of 20, he entered the Bavarian Army as an officer candidate (Fahnenjunker), and by September 1914 he had been commissioned lieutenant.

After serving in World War I he joined the preliminary Reichswehr. From 1 September to 31 December 1920, he served with the Munich State Police (Landespolizei München) but soon realized that this profession did not suit him and returned to the Reichswehr on 1 January 1921.

By the outbreak of World War II in 1939 he was commander of the 100th (mountain) (Gebirgsjäger) Regiment, and was awarded the Knight's Cross of the Iron Cross for his leadership of this regiment during the invasion of Crete during May and June 1941.

In April 1943, Utz was appointed commander of the newly reconstituted 100th Jäger Division, which had been destroyed at the end of the Battle of Stalingrad. Promoted to major general (Generalmajor) on 1 July 1943, he held his command on the Eastern Front from March to December 1944.

Now a lieutenant general (Generalleutnant), he took over command of the 2nd Mountain Division on 9 February 1945 when its previous commander was wounded. After fighting on the Western Front in the Saar-Moselle Triangle, his new command, earlier in the war considered an elite unit, was well below strength and combat effectiveness. The division finished the war in Württemberg where Utz surrendered it to the Western Allies.

== Promotions ==
- 1 October 1913 Fahnenjunker (Officer Candidate)
- 7 January 1914 Fahnenjunker-Unteroffizier (Officer Candidate with Corporal/NCO/Junior Sergeant rank)
- 1 July 1914 Fähnrich (Officer Cadet)
- 19 September 1914 Leutnant (2nd Lieutenant) without Patent (ernannt)
  - 9 October 1917 received Patent from 7 January 1913
- 6 April 1918 Oberleutnant (1st Lieutenant)
  - 1 July 1922 received Reichswehr Rank Seniority (RDA) from 18 April 1918 (21)
- 1 September 1920 Oberleutnant der Landespolizei (1st Lieutenant of the State Police)
- 1 November 1926 (2) Hauptmann (Captain)
- 1 September 1934 Major (6)
- 16 March 1937 Oberstleutnant (Lieutenant Colonel) with effect and RDA from 1 March 1937 (30)
- 30 January 1940 Oberst (Colonel) with effect and RDA from 1 February 1940 (28)
- 10 July 1943 Generalmajor (Major General) with effect and RDA from 1 July 1943 (6a)
- 24 January 1944 (telex date) Generalleutnant (Lieutenant General) with effect and RDA from 1 February 1944 (8)

== Awards and decorations ==
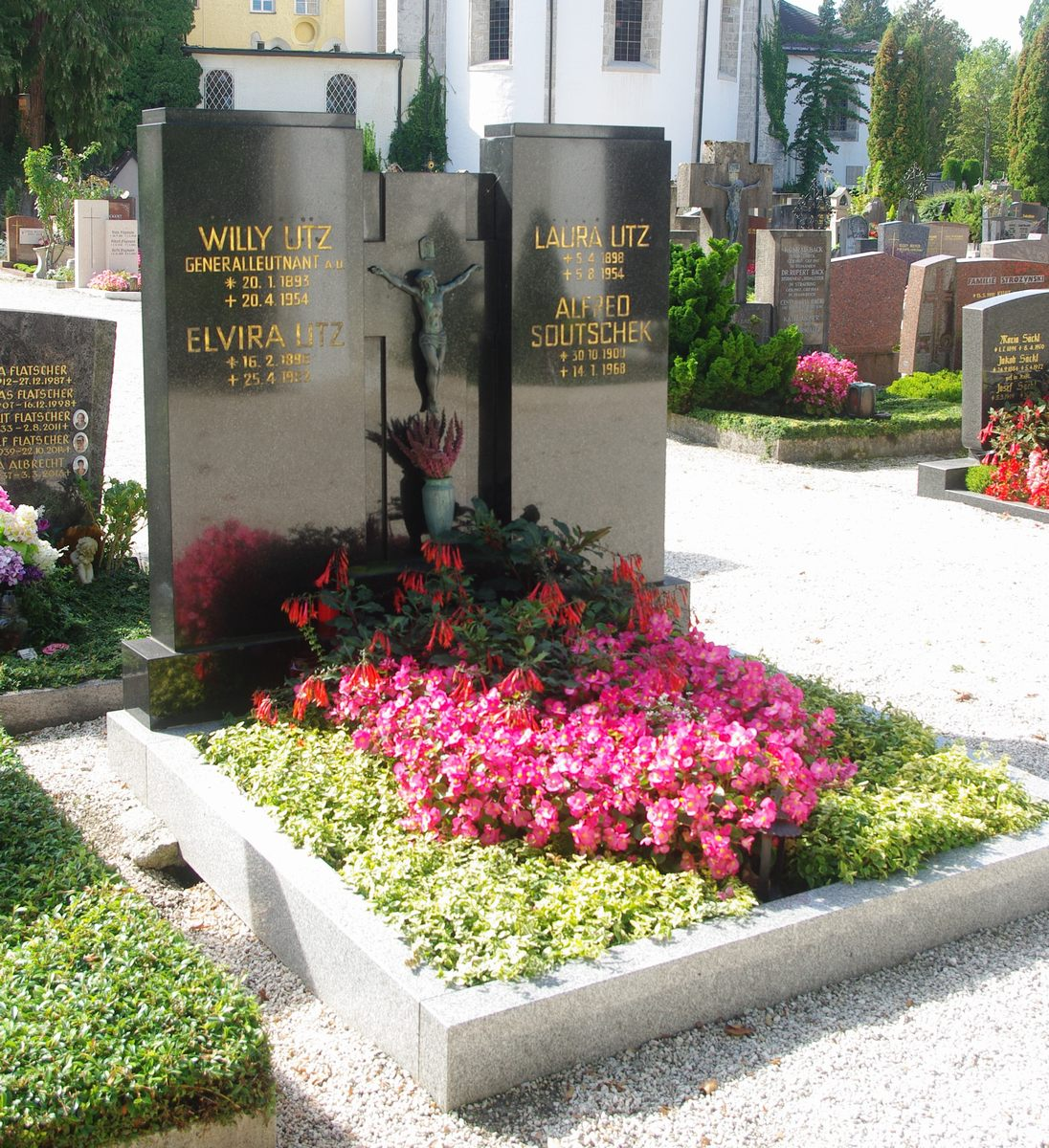
Grave in Bad Reichenhall

- Iron Cross (1914), 2nd and 1st Class
  - 2nd Class in late 1914
  - 1st Class on 9 July 1916
- Military Merit Order (Bavaria), 4th Class with Swords (BMV4X/BM4X) on 25 May 1915
- Military Merit Cross (Austria-Hungary), 3rd Class with the War Decoration (ÖM3K) on 28 April 1917
- Military Merit Order (Bavaria), 4th Class with Swords and the Royal Crown (BMV4mKrX/BM4mKrX) on 15 November 1917
- Wound Badge (1918) in Black
- Honour Cross of the World War 1914/1918 with Swords
- Army Mountain Guide Badge (Germany)
- Wehrmacht Long Service Award, 4th to 1st Class
  - 2nd Class on 2 October 1936
  - 1st Class (25-year Service Cross) on 1 October 1938
- German Olympia Honour Badge, 1st Class on 30 November 1936
- Repetition Clasp 1939 to the Iron Cross 1914, 2nd and 1st Class
  - 2nd Class on 3 October 1939
  - 1st Class on 16 October 1939
- Mentioned by name in the Wehrmachtbericht on 11 June 1941
- Bulgarian Order of Bravery, III. Grade, 1st Class
- Winter Battle in the East 1941–42 Medal on 7 August 1942
- Crete Cuff Title on 31 December 1942
- Knight's Cross of the Iron Cross on 21 June 1941 as Oberst (Colonel) and Commander of the Gebirgs-Jäger-Regiment 100 during the Battle of Crete.
- German Cross in Gold on 22 March 1945 as Generalleutnant and Commander of the 2. Gebirgs-Division

== Sources ==
- German Federal Archives: BArch PERS 6/972 and PERS 6/301169

== Notes ==
Military offices
Preceded by Generalleutnant Werner Sanne	Commander of the 100th Jäger Division; 1 February 1943 – 1 January 1945	Succeeded by Oberst Hans Kreppel
Preceded by Oberst Hans Roschmann	Commander of the 2nd Mountain Division; 9 February 1945 – German capitulation	Succeeded by none
