= Rudolf Baričević =

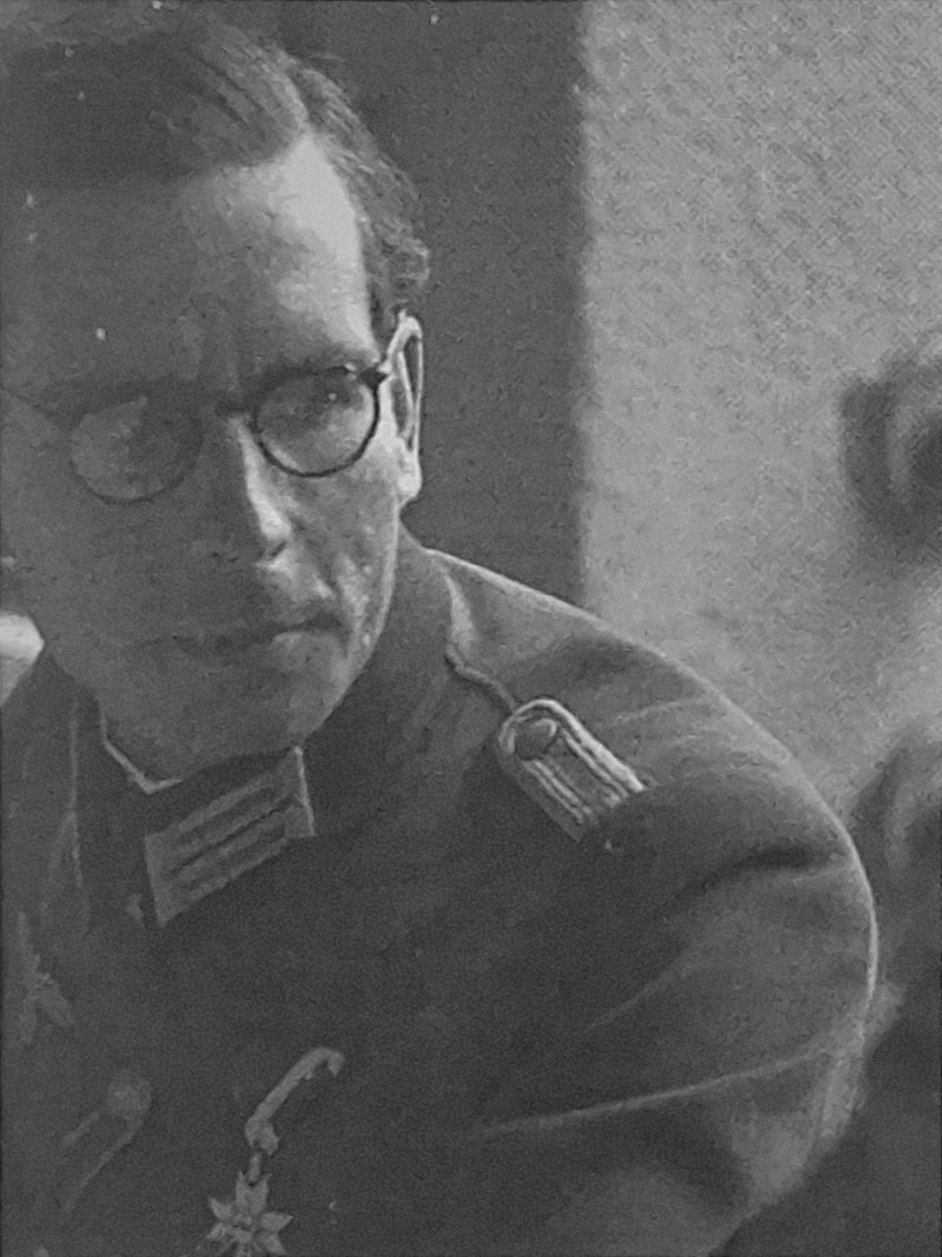
Rudolf Baričević after returning to his homeland, June 9, 1943.

Rudolf Baričević (1914, Jablanac – November 10, 1999, Zagreb) was a member of the Croatian Home Guard who participated in the Battle of Stalingrad with the 369th Reinforced Infantry Regiment. Baričević is credited with writing the war journal of the 369th Reinforced Infantry Regiment. He was the last Croat airlifted out of Stalingrad, leaving the city on the night of January 22.

Baričević left the country in 1945. He returned to Croatia after the country's independence and published his book Život u emigraciji (Life in Emigration) in 1993. He died on November 10, 1999, and is buried in Mirogoj cemetery.
