= Viktor Pavičić =

Croatian soldier (1898-1943)

Colonel Viktor Pavičić
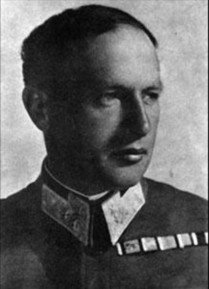
- Born: Viktor Pavičić; 15 October 1898; Gospić, Croatia-Slavonia, Austria-Hungary
- Died: 20 January 1943 (aged 44); Stalingrad, RSFSR, Soviet Union (now Volgograd, Russia)
- Military career
- Allegiance: Independent State of Croatia
- Branch: Croatian Armed Forces
- Service years: –1943
- Rank: Colonel
- Unit: 369th Reinforced Croatian Infantry Regiment
- Commands: 369th Reinforced Croatian Infantry Regiment
- Conflicts: World War II; Eastern Front; Battle of Stalingrad †

Viktor Pavičić (15 October 1898 – 20 January 1943) was a Croatian military commander who led the 369th Reinforced Croatian Infantry Regiment, which fought on the Eastern Front and was involved in the Battle of Stalingrad during World War II.

== Biography ==
Viktor Pavičić was born on 15 October 1898 in Gospić. A colonel, he was the commander of the Croatian Home Guard military academy from July to August 1942. In August, he was named commander of the 369th Croatian Reinforced Infantry Regiment that was to fight alongside other Axis forces on the Eastern Front. In late September, Croatian leader Ante Pavelić met with Pavičić and decorated him. Immediately afterwards, Pavičić and his regiment left the Independent State of Croatia to participate in the Battle of Stalingrad.

The 369th Reinforced Infantry Regiment was devastated in the ensuing battle, and Pavičić elected to leave the surviving Croatian soldiers, and return to Croatia. He was killed on 20 January 1943. There are several conflicting accounts of how he died. One account holds that the airplane in which he was travelling was shot down by the Soviets, while another states that he was executed by the Germans for wishing to leave the battlefield. He was replaced by Lieutenant Colonel Marko Mesić on 21 January.
