= Otto Schury =

- Born: 22 October 1903
- Died: 11 December 1979 (aged 76)
- Military career
- Allegiance: Nazi Germany
- Branch: Army
- Rank: Generalmajor
- Commands: 100th Light Infantry Division
- Conflicts: World War II
- Awards: Knight's Cross of the Iron Cross with Oak Leaves

Otto Schury (22 October 1903 – 11 December 1979) was a German general during World War II. He was a recipient of the Knight's Cross of the Iron Cross with Oak Leaves of Nazi Germany.

In February 1945, Schury was appointed commander of the 100th Jäger Division. Promoted to major general (Generalmajor) in April, his command surrendered to the Soviet Army in Silesia the following month and Schury was imprisoned in the Soviet Union. He was released in 1955. and died in 1979.

== Awards ==
- Iron Cross (1939) 2nd Class (20 September 1939) & 1st Class (23 February 1940)
- German Cross in Gold on 10 May 1943 as Oberstleutnant in Jäger-Regiment 229
- Knight's Cross of the Iron Cross with Oak Leaves
  - Knight's Cross on 17 July 1941 as Major and commander of the II./Gebirgsjäger-Regiment 100
  - Oak Leaves on 21 September 1944 as Oberst and commander of Jäger-Regiment 229

== Notes ==
Military offices
Preceded by Oberst Hans Kreppel	Commander of 100th Jäger Division; 1 February 1945 – May 1945	Succeeded by None
