= Yamnoye, Volodarsky District, Astrakhan Oblast =

Yamnoye Ямное
- Selo
- Location within Astrakhan Oblast Location within Russia
- Coordinates: 46°19′N 48°42′E
- Country: Russia
- Region: Astrakhan Oblast
- District: Volodarsky District
- Time zone: UTC+4:00

Yamnoye (Russian: Ямное) is a rural locality (a selo) in Kozlovsky Selsoviet of Volodarsky District, Astrakhan Oblast, Russia. The population was 278 as of 2010. There are 4 streets.

== Geography ==
Yamnoye is located 19 km (12 mi) southeast of Volodarsky (the district's administrative centre) by road. Churkin is the nearest rural locality.
