= Werner Sanne =

German general during WW2

Werner Otto Sanne
- Born: 5 April 1889; Berlin
- Died: 26 September 1952 (aged 63); Krasnopol Prison Camp
- Military career
- Allegiance: German Empire; Weimar Republic; Nazi Germany
- Branch: Army
- Rank: Generalleutnant
- Commands: 193rd Replacement Division; 34th Infantry Division; 100th Jäger Division
- Conflicts: World War II
- Awards: Knight's Cross of the Iron Cross Iron Trefoil 1st Class

Werner Otto Sanne (5 April 1889 – 26 September 1952) was a German general (Generalleutnant) in the Wehrmacht during World War II who commanded several divisions. He was a recipient of the Knight's Cross of the Iron Cross of Nazi Germany.

== Career ==
Sanne commanded the 34th Infantry Division from May to November 1940, having earlier been in charge of the 193rd Replacement Division, which served to control replacement units undergoing training. In December 1940, he was appointed commander of the 100th Light Infantry Division, which had just been formed in Vienna. His new command fought entirely on the Eastern Front, firstly in Ukraine and later in 1942, as part of the 6th Army, at Stalingrad. Promoted to Generalleutnant (lieutenant general) in April 1942, shortly before the division was redesignated as the 100th Jäger Division, he surrendered to the Soviet troops in January 1943 at the conclusion of the Battle of Stalingrad. He died in captivity in 1952.

== Awards and decorations ==
- Iron Cross (1939) 2nd Class & 1st Class
- German Cross in Gold (19 December 1941)
- Knight's Cross of the Iron Cross on 22 February 1942 as generalleutnant and commander of 100th Infantry Division

Military offices
| Preceded by none | Commander of the 100th Light Infantry Division; 10 December 1940 – 6 July 1942 | Succeeded by renamed to 100th Jäger Division |
| Preceded by formerly 100th Light Infantry Division | Commander of the 100th Jäger Division; 6 July 1942 – 31 January 1943 | Succeeded by Generalleutnant Willibald Utz |
