= Ikryanoye =

Rural locality in Astrakhan Oblast, Russia

Coordinates: 46°06′N 47°44′E

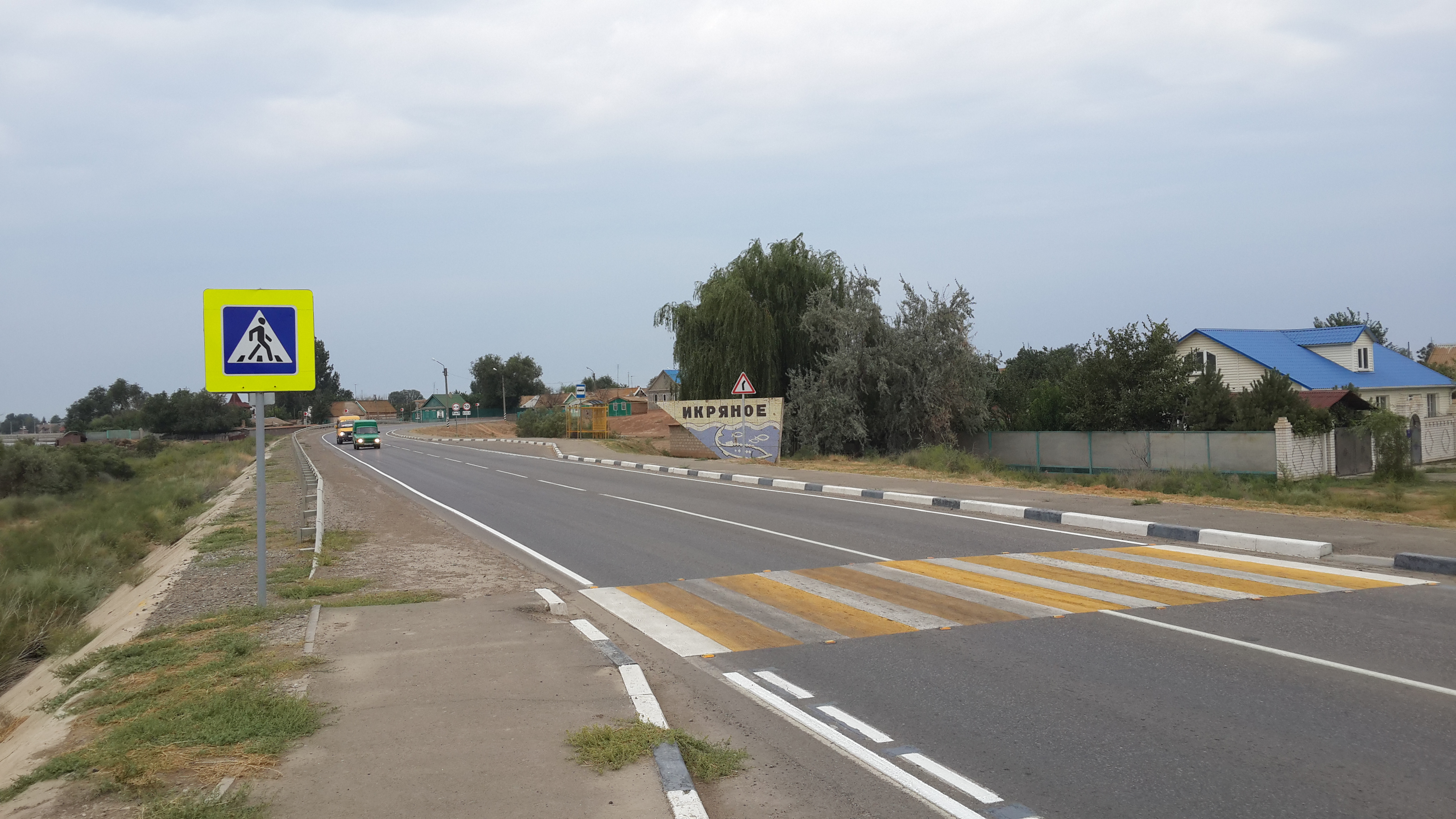
Road in Ikryanoye

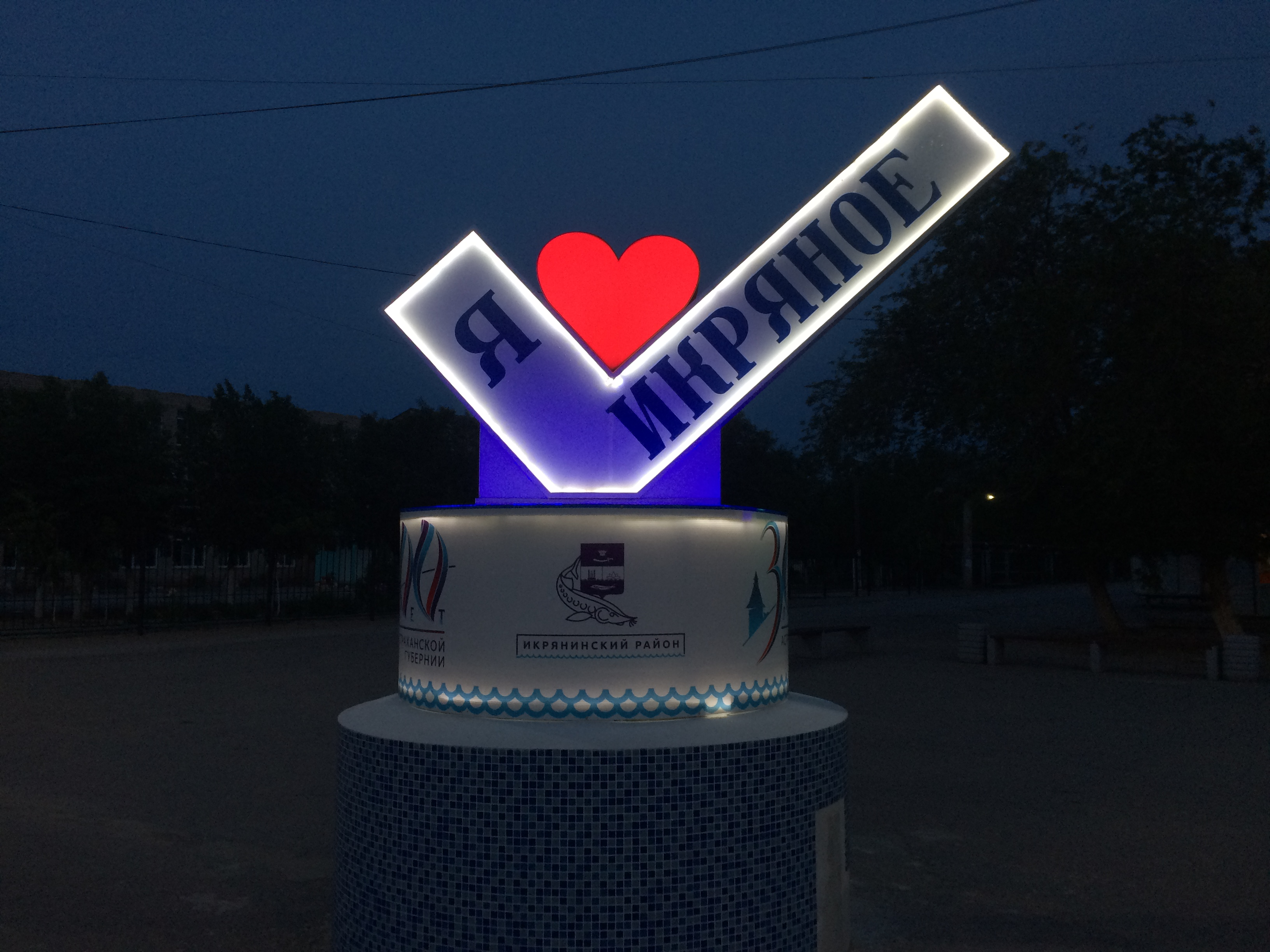
A sign in Ikryanoe.

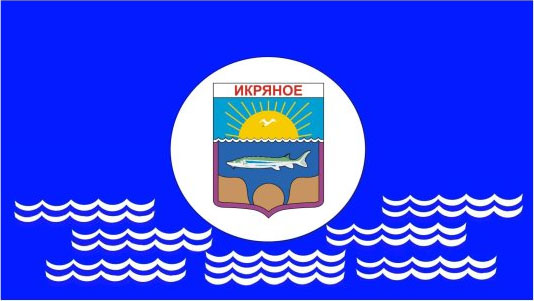
Flag of Ikryanoye

Ikryanoye (Russian: Икряное; Kazakh: Икрян, Ikrıan) is a rural locality (a selo) and the administrative center of Ikryaninsky District of Astrakhan Oblast, Russia. Population: 10,036 (2010 census); 9,925 (2002 census); 9,629 (1989 Soviet census).
