= Ikryaninsky District =

Ikryaninsky District Икрянинский район (Russian)
- District
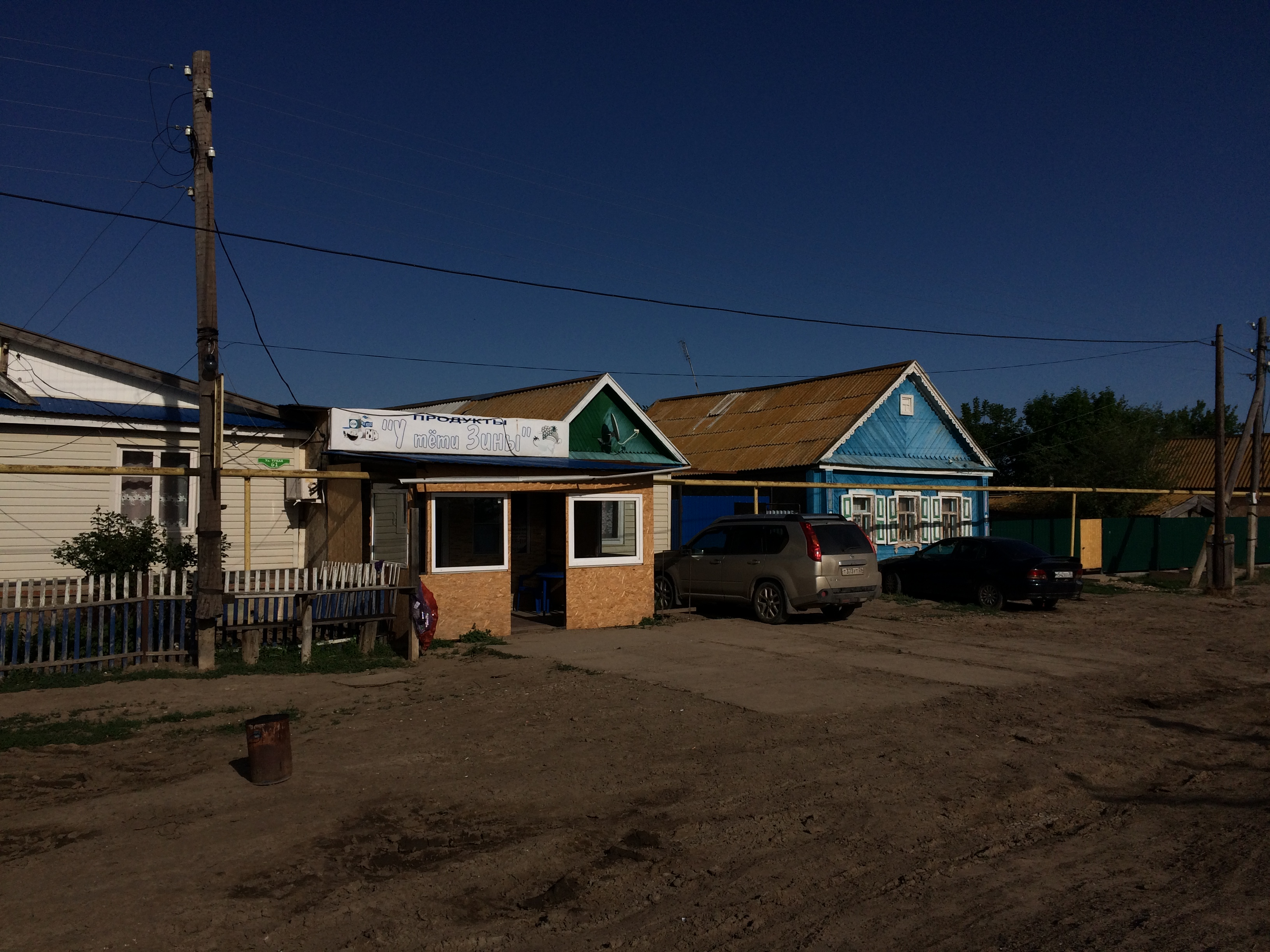
- The selo of Novo-Bulgary in Ikryaninsky District

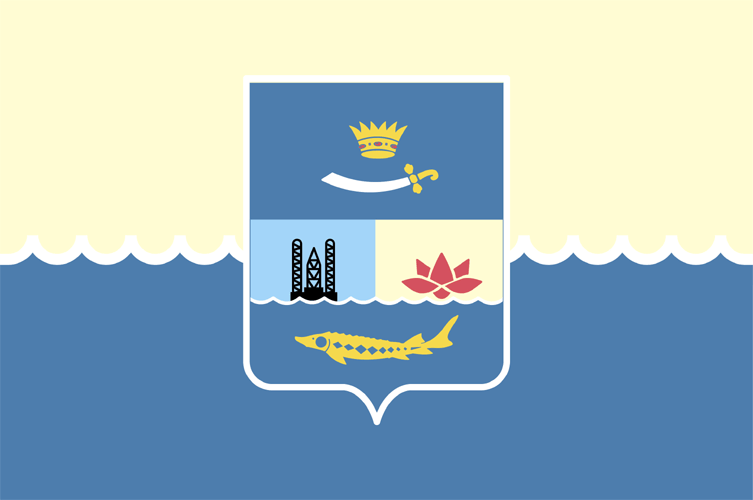
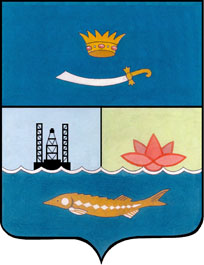
- Flag Coat of arms
- Location of Ikryaninsky District in Astrakhan Oblast
- Coordinates: 46°05′N 47°44′E
- Country: Russia
- Federal subject: Astrakhan Oblast
- Established: July 14, 1925
- Administrative center: Ikryanoye

Area
  - Total: 1,950 km^{2} (750 sq mi)

Population (2010 Census)
  - Total: 47,759
  - Estimate (beginning of 2015): 48,084
  - Density: 24.5/km^{2} (63.4/sq mi)
  - Urban: 23.3%
  - Rural: 76.7%

Administrative structure
  - Administrative divisions: 2 Urban-type settlements, 12 Selsoviets
  - Inhabited localities: 2 urban-type settlements, 35 rural localities

Municipal structure
  - Municipally incorporated as: Ikryaninsky Municipal District
  - Municipal divisions: 2 urban settlements, 12 rural settlements
- Time zone: UTC+4 (MSK+1)
- OKTMO ID: 12620000
- Website: http://www.ikradm.ru

Population of Ikryaninsky District
- 2010 Census: 47,759
- 2002 Census: 48,418
- 1989 Census: 49,421
- 1979 Census: 49,606

Ikryaninsky District (Russian: Икря́нинский райо́н; Kazakh: Икрян ауданы, Ikrıan aýdany) is an administrative and municipal district (raion), one of the eleven in Astrakhan Oblast, Russia. It is located in the south of the oblast. The area of the district is 1,950 square kilometers (750 sq mi). Its administrative center is the rural locality (a selo) of Ikryanoye. As of the 2010 Census, the total population of the district was 47,759, with the population of Ikryanoye accounting for 21.0% of that number.

== History ==
The district was established on July 14, 1925.
