= Viktor Gutić =

Croatian fascist official (1901–1947)

- Viktor Gutić in the Ustaše uniform

Commissioner for Banja Luka
- In office 20 April 1941 – 10 August 1941
- Preceded by: Office established
- Succeeded by: Mirko Beljan

Grand Prefect of Pokuplje
- In office 10 April 1942 – 10 August 1942
- Preceded by: Ante Nikšić
- Succeeded by: Nikola Tusun

Personal details
- Born: 23 December 1901 Banja Luka, Condominium of Bosnia and Herzegovina, Austria-Hungary
- Died: 20 February 1947 (aged 45) Banja Luka, PR Bosnia and Herzegovina, FPR Yugoslavia
- Party: Ustaše
- Education: University of Zagreb
- Profession: Lawyer

Military service
- Allegiance: Independent State of Croatia
- Branch/service: Croatian Armed Forces
- Years of service: 1941–1945
- Rank: Colonel
- Battles/wars: World War II in Yugoslavia

Viktor Gutić (23 December 1901 – 20 February 1947) was the Ustaše commissioner for Banja Luka and the Grand Prefect of Pokuplje in the Independent State of Croatia (NDH), an Axis puppet state during World War II. He was responsible for the persecution of Serbs, Jews and Roma in the Bosanska Krajina region between 1941 and 1942.

In April 1941, following the establishment of the NDH, Ustaše leader Ante Pavelić placed Gutić in charge of the territory of the former Vrbas Banovina. Gutić initiated a campaign of Croatianizing Banja Luka—banning the Cyrillic script, prohibiting Serbs and Jews from using public transportation, and initiating a series of massacres targeting the Serb population. Pavelić transferred Gutić to Zagreb in August 1941, after the Germans complained about his brutality, but he continued to wield influence in Banja Luka and its surroundings. This culminated in the Drakulić massacre of 7 February 1942, which Gutić helped plan, and resulted in the deaths of more than 2,000 Serb civilians. The following month, he was appointed as the Grand Prefect of Pokuplje, centred in Karlovac. By August 1942, partly due to his excesses and partly due to those of his brother, whom he had appointed as Banja Luka's police chief, Gutić fell out of favour with the Ustaše leadership and tendered his resignation. He moved to Zagreb and remained there until the NDH collapsed in May 1945.

After the Allied victory, Gutić fled first to Austria and then to Italy. He was arrested in Venice several months later after a Jewish refugee from Banja Luka recognized him and reported him to the authorities. He was imprisoned at an Allied prison camp in Grottaglie before being extradited to Yugoslavia in 1946. In February 1947, he was found guilty of collaboration and war crimes, sentenced to death, and executed by hanging in Banja Luka.

== Early life ==
Viktor Gutić was born in Banja Luka on 23 December 1901. He completed his secondary education in his hometown. In his teenage years, he was one of the founders of the Croatian National Youth (Croatian: Hrvatska nacionalna omladina, HANAO), the youth arm of the Party of Rights. Following the creation of the Kingdom of Serbs, Croats and Slovenes in late 1918, he joined the Croatian Peasant Party (Croatian: Hrvatska seljačka stranka, HSS) and became its local branch secretary. He subsequently enrolled in the University of Zagreb's Faculty of Law, and upon graduation with a doctoral thesis, he returned to Banja Luka and opened his practice. Among his law clerks was Vilko Butorac, who would later become one of his closest confidants. In 1925, Gutić left the HSS and joined Ante Trumbić's Croatian Federalist Peasant Party (Croatian: Hrvatska federalistička seljačka stranka, HFSS). Gutić soon left the HFSS because he considered it too moderate.

In the early 1930s, Gutić became a supporter of the fascist Croatian nationalist Ustaše movement and its leader Ante Pavelić. The movement had been outlawed shortly after its creation in 1929, and Pavelić was forced into exile. Gutić's political activities—which included distributing Ustaše propaganda materials—led to several criminal convictions, most of which resulted in fines. In 1932, he was jailed for 15 months at Sremska Mitrovica prison, where he shared a cell with other Ustaše, including Juco Rukavina and Jurica Frković. (Note: Both were later closely involved in setting up the Jadovno concentration camp.) After his release, he continued engaging in Ustaše activities, and was arrested again in 1938. During his incarceration, he organized the first Ustaše branch in the Vrbas Banovina. According to the scholars Goran Latinović and Nikola Ožegović, for much of the interwar period, Gutić was known to the people of Banja Luka for his drinking habits, debts, and his homosexuality, the latter of which was frequently ridiculed. In the lead-up to the outbreak of World War II in Yugoslavia, he maintained regular contact with Ustaše members outside the country, as well as inside it, such as the Franciscan friar Miroslav Filipović, who joined the movement in 1940. According to Latinović and Ožegović, he was fond of saying that he was "thirsty for Serbian blood".

== World War II ==
=== Creation of the NDH ===
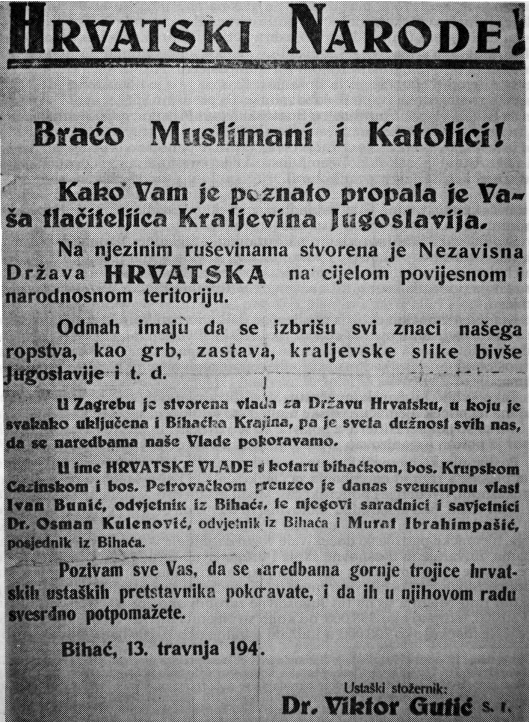
A proclamation signed by Gutić, addressed to "brothers Muslims and Catholics", announcing Yugoslavia's collapse and the establishment of the Independent State of Croatia

During the Axis invasion of Yugoslavia in April 1941, Gutić was mobilized as a reserve lieutenant in a rear unit near the town of Bihać, in northwestern Bosnia. On 11 April, the day the Germans bombed Bihać, Prijedor and Banja Luka, Gutić was in Ripač along with another rear lieutenant, Adem Haračić, and ordered that white flags be flown to signify surrender to the Germans. After hearing Slavko Kvaternik's proclamation of the establishment of the Axis puppet state the Independent State of Croatia (Croatian: Nezavisna država Hrvatska, NDH), he and Haračić went to Bihać, where they connected with Ustaše sympathizers and began laying the groundwork for Ustaše rule over the town and the surrounding region. On 13 April, Gutić issued a pro-NDH declaration, while units of the Royal Yugoslav Army were still active between Ripač and Bihać. He announced that the governments in four kotars (Bihać, Bosanska Krupa, Cazin and Bosanski Petrovac) were to be overtaken by Ustaše functionary Ivan Bunić, as well as Gutić's associates Osman Kulenović and Murat Ibrahimpašić. Gutić and Haračić then established Ustaše governance structures in Bosanski Novi and Prijedor, as well as Bosanska Krupa where they tasked Šefik Tatlić and Ivan Holub with a take-over. Similar steps were taken in Cazin and Velika Kladuša by Gutić's associates. On 15 April, Butorac and Gutić's brother Blaž welcomed elements of the German 183rd Division as they entered Banja Luka. Gutić himself arrived in the town on 17 April. That same day, after 11 days of resistance, representatives of the Yugoslav government surrendered unconditionally to the Axis.

Pavelić and his inner circle considered Gutić politically reliable and ideologically committed to the Ustaše cause. On 20 April, Pavelić summoned him to Zagreb and appointed him as the Ustaše commissioner (Croatian: ustaški stožernik) of the former Vrbas Banovina, which had previously encompassed all of northwestern Bosnia and parts of Lika. (Note: Gutić later bestowed upon himself the title Ustaše Commissioner for Bosnian Croatia (Croatian: ustaški stožernik za bosansku Hrvatsku), apparently in an attempt to further enhance his standing.) Gutić was directly subordinated to Colonel (Croatian: pukovnik) Jure Francetić, who had been appointed the principal commissioner for Bosnia and Herzegovina. Feliks Neđelski was named as Gutić's deputy, (Note: In some sources, his name is spelled Niedzielski.) and shortly after the NDH's establishment, Gutić appointed his brother Blaž as Banja Luka's police chief. While in Zagreb, Gutić met with several high-ranking Ustaše officials, including the NDH Minister of Internal Affairs, Andrija Artuković, and the Minister of the Armed Forces, Slavko Kvaternik.

Pavelić instructed Gutić to make preparations for the "liquidation" of Vrbas Banovina. In the words of scholar Tomislav Dulić, the Ustaše saw the Serbian people—especially dwellers of Bosnian Krajina, Lika, Kordun and Banija—similar to the way the Ottoman administrators saw the Armenian people in 1915, "namely as a potential threat living in the heart of the country". The Vrbas Banovina alone, according to the 1931 Yugoslav census, had more than one million inhabitants, of whom 600,000 were Serbs, 250,000 were Bosnian Muslims and only 170,000 were Croats. On 24 April, despite receiving no order from Zagreb to do so, Gutić decreed that "all persons" who were born or had roots in "the former Serbia and Montenegro" had to leave the NDH within five days. Several days later, he issued a clarification stating that Catholics and Muslims born in those countries were exempt.

=== Murder of Bishop Platon ===
To ease the anti-Serb measures and convince Gutić to postpone his five-day deadline, Platon, the Serbian Orthodox Bishop of Banja Luka, decided to arrange a meeting with Gutić. He selected Dušan Mačkić, a priest from Ključ, to act as his intermediary. On 27 April 1941, Mačkić met with Gutić and Butorac at the Ustaše headquarters in Banja Luka. During this meeting, Gutić spoke openly about his intentions and stated that his forthcoming measures were "God's punishment for you Serbs". Ultimately, he agreed to postpone the deportations by ten days. He also unexpectedly decided to appoint Mačkić as Platon's successor, given that the latter was scheduled to be deported. Mačkić complained that he was not second in rank to Platon. Gutić insisted, reasoning that Platon's deputy, Bishop Sava, had been born in Montenegro and would be deported. Mačkić reluctantly accepted the appointment. After a Sarajevo newspaper printed the news of the decision, local Serbs began to gather outside Mačkić's home, pleading with him to intervene on behalf of their friends and relatives. Platon refused to leave his diocese, and on 1 May wrote Gutić a letter pledging not to "abandon his flock".

The Ustaše arrested Platon on the night of 4–5 May. His arrest was overseen by Asim Đelić, who in addition to being Gutić's bodyguard, was also his homosexual lover. The bishop was imprisoned with another cleric in a local jail, which locals dubbed the Black House. Together with two other Ustaše, Mirko Kovačević and Nino Čondrić, Đelić forced the two clerics into the back of a car and drove them to the outskirts of Banja Luka. They were subsequently dragged to the banks of the Vrbas, near the village of Rebrovac. Đelić, Kovačević and Čondrić beat the two clerics and tortured them, tearing Platon's beard, gouging out his eyes, and cutting off his nose and ears. Pieces of his flesh were removed with a knife, and salt was poured on his wounds. Platon's body was found on the confluence of the Vrbanja and Vrbas later that month.

=== Anti-Serb and antisemitic decrees ===
In late April 1941, Gutić established the title of Commissar of Jewish Property and Apartments, whose responsibility was to collect all rent that had previously been paid to Jewish landlords. He also forbade the buying of property from Serbs and Jews or looking after their property, except on behalf of the NDH authorities. By May, he had appointed at least ten prominent Ustaše members as power brokers in northwestern Bosnia, often promising them expropriated property in return for accepting the position. In one of his first acts, he ordered Banja Luka's wealthiest Serb citizens to bring him large sums of money within twenty-four hours or face "dire consequences".

Speaking at the Franciscan friary at Petrićevac on 12 May, Gutić stated that "every Croat who today takes the side of our former enemies is not only not a good Croat but an enemy and saboteur of our planned and well-thought-out blueprint for the purification of Croatia from all unwanted elements." Gutić, through his newspaper Hrvatska Krajina (Croatian Frontier), began issuing public orders and declarations that defined "new lines of inclusion and exclusion along an ethnic axis". On 17 May, he decreed that all adherents of the Serbian and Russian Orthodox Churches would now be classified as "Greek Easterners" (Croatian: grko-istočnjaci). This decree effectively annulled the use of the ethnic identifier "Serb" in Ustaše parlance, and preceded a similar declaration by the NDH government by nearly two months. All writing in the Cyrillic script, which the Ustaše considered a symbol of "Serbdom, Balkanism and Byzantism", was banned. Flags, emblems and photographs that had any association with Yugoslavia, Serb politicians or the deposed Karađorđević dynasty were removed from public spaces. Streets that had once been named after Serb historical figures were renamed after Ustaše leaders or historical figures whom the Ustaše regarded as Croats, irrespective of whether they were Catholic or Muslim. (Note: The Ustaše regarded the Bosnian Muslims as the "flower of the Croatian nation" and did not consider them to be distinct from Croats. Nevertheless, Gutić's followers engaged in factional struggles with Muslim members of the movement.) One such Banja Luka street was renamed after Gutić himself. Evening curfews were established for Serbs and Jews. Large numbers of Serbs working in the public sector, as well as people considered "enemies of the state", lost their government jobs. It was decreed that Croats were to be given preference in public transportation. Hrvatska Krajina printed articles on the ostensibly anti-Croat activities of individual Serbs and other non-Croats "whose presence is unwanted in our lands". Under statewide laws adopted in late April, he ordered that Jewish people had to wear an identifying yellow patch with a Star of David and prominent letter Ž designating them as Jews (Croatian: Židovi).

From 20 to 24 May, Gutić participated in additional discussions in Zagreb with senior NDH officials. On 23 May, Pavelić instructed him to begin the process of transforming Banja Luka into the capital of the NDH. (Note: Pavelić told Gutić he had already made up his mind, adding that he "knew the city well" from having lived there in his youth. His intention to turn Banja Luka into Croatia's new capital predated the war.) The Ustaše leadership envisioned that the town would be renamed Antingrad, after the Poglavnik Ante Pavelić. Two days later, Gutić announced that the town and its surroundings "should be cleansed of Serbs, Jews and Roma" to make way for government officials, as well as Croat émigrés and construction workers, to settle it. In Gutić's words, it would be transformed "from a small regional town into a real city of the future", which would be achieved through the construction of new roads and railway lines, the redesign of streets and the creation of a public building program. Around this time, it was decided that the company Soravija would be awarded the contract for demolishing the Serbian Orthodox Cathedral of the Holy Trinity in Banja Luka, which had been damaged by Luftwaffe bombs during the previous month's invasion.

=== Incitement to violence ===
While passing through Prijedor on his way to Banja Luka on 27 May 1941, Gutić became indignant that there were no bodies of Serbs hung in the town's square, unlike in nearby Sanski Most. (Note: On 9 May 1941, about thirty Serb men were shot and their bodies hung in the streets of Sanski Most to intimidate the Serb and Jewish population.) Upon returning to Banja Luka on 28 May, he announced:

To my pleasure and for the benefit of the people I have completed great and important tasks in Zagreb. Now I will begin the grandiose work of cleansing Bosnian Krajina from undesired elements, particularly from Banja Luka, which will become the capital of the Independent State of Croatia ... That which I have done so far is nothing, it is such a trifle that it can only be seen through a microscope, so you can imagine what more awaits the enemies of the Independent State of Croatia in our domesticised Bosnian Krajina. My hands are untied in that respect. I want to serve the will of God and the people. All undesired elements will soon be destroyed in our Krajina, so that soon all trace of them will be wiped out and only a bad memory of them will remain. (Note: This statement was published in Hrvatska Krajina.)

On this same occasion, Gutić was also quoted as saying: "These Serbian Gypsies will be sent to Serbia, part by trains and part through the river Sava, without boats... All Serbian pests older than 15 will be killed and their children will be put to monasteries and turned into good Catholics." Two days later, Gutić continued in the same vein at an Ustaše rally in Sanski Most. "The Serbian army is no more. Serbia is no more... our bloodsuckers, the gypsy Karađorđević dynasty has vanished." He added:

I have published drastic laws for their complete economic destruction, and new ones will follow for their complete extermination. Don't be generous toward any of them. Bear in mind that they were always our gravediggers and destroy them wherever they may be found, and the blessings of the Poglavnik and myself will be upon you ... Let the Serbs hope for nothing. For their sakes it would be best if they emigrate. Let them disappear from this region of ours, this homeland of ours.

On 6 June, Gutić was appointed as the commissioner of the districts of Sana–Luka and Krbava–Psat. Alija Omanović was named as his deputy. Gutić called for retribution against the Serb population in response to the killing of several Ustaše by Serb rebels in eastern Herzegovina in early June. Nevertheless, he offered Serbs and Jews the opportunity to escape to the Italian occupation zone in exchange for a considerable bribe. Whereas Gutić assumed control of Jewish and Serb estates, the revenue derived from his nationalization measures was distributed to his followers.

=== Ethnic cleansing operations ===
On 14 June 1941, Wehrmacht officer Arthur Heffner sent a confidential report to German plenipotentiary general Edmund Glaise-Horstenau, in which he identified Gutić as the primary initiator of the massacres targeting Serbs in northwestern Bosnia: "All the Serbs who did not manage to hide in the woods or to cross the border were slaughtered without mercy. Thus, often neither women nor children were spared." Some of Banja Luka's Catholics and Muslims joined, or at least aided, the anti-fascist resistance, helping hide their Serb and Jewish neighbours and providing other forms of assistance. Generalmajor Johann Fortner, commander of the German 118th Jäger Division headquartered in Banja Luka, also opposed Gutić's actions because he felt they would only fuel the Serb opposition to the NDH and the Axis occupiers. Gutić remained indifferent to such appeals, saying: "If, by some mishap, Yugoslavia were reintegrated, at least we would have reduced the statistical numbers [of Serbs] in favour of the Croats."

By the first half of July, Gutić and his inner circle had reaped considerable plunder from those deported by the Ustaše, with some expropriated properties and businesses given to Gutić's associates and others sold for his gain. Gutić's actions came to the attention of the authorities in Zagreb, and in July, the State Office for Renewal issued a memorandum warning against such behaviour. (Note: "All property of the resettled Serbs, like that of those who have yet to be resettled, is the property of the Independent State of Croatia, with the State Office for Renewal having sole power over its administration and management.") Due to the open embezzlement of officials such as Gutić, the authorities in Zagreb attempted to force those targeted for resettlement to first register their property with the central government. These efforts were largely unsuccessful, and expropriations by local Ustaše officials continued largely unabated. In late July 1941, Fortner openly argued with Gutić against his political decisions, and threatened to arrest him and his associates. In August, Gutić oversaw the demolition of Banja Luka's damaged Serbian Orthodox cathedral to make space for a statue of Croatian politician Ante Starčević on the newly renamed Square of April 10. Gutić also cited aesthetic reasons for its destruction, and asserted that the cathedral, which he dubbed "the house of spite", had been "forcibly squeezed between two delightful buildings and spoiled the whole view of an otherwise very beautiful part of Banja Luka." He later praised Emil Soravia, the contractor tasked with demolishing the cathedral, for making quick work of its removal.

Gutić was granted an audience with Pavelić on 5 August, where Pavelić told him that he would be transferred to the Ministry of the Interior in Zagreb. On 9 August, a farewell banquet for Gutić was held in Banja Luka, and he departed the following day. News of his new role was publicly announced on 25 August. On 17 September, Lieutenant Mirko Beljan was appointed as his successor. The following month, Gutić's brother Blaž was removed from his position as police chief and replaced by Božo Dražić. Despite these setbacks, numerous local officials remained indebted to Gutić, maintaining his position of influence in Banja Luka. He continued to visit and spend time there even after his deposition, for example, from December 1941 to April 1942.

On 7 January 1942, the Wehrmacht called back its units from Banja Luka to take part in an offensive against Serb insurgents in eastern Bosnia. Gutić subsequently arranged for a battalion of the Poglavnik's Bodyguard Brigade, which was made up of Croats from Herzegovina and commanded by Captain Nikola Zelić, to be transferred from Zagreb to Banja Luka. The position of local stožernik was now held by Mirko Beljan, and that of the Grand Prefect (Croatian: veliki župan) by Colonel Ladislav Aleman, a former Austro-Hungarian officer. Gutić thus officially had no authority in Banja Luka, but because of the networks of influence and patronage he had created over the previous year, he remained the primary decision-maker in the town and its surroundings. The decision to kill the Serbs of Drakulić, Šargovac and Motike was made in his house. According to a contemporary German report, on 6 February 1942, a meeting was held at Petrićevac between Gutić, the jurist Ferdo Stilinović, and many Catholic priests, among them Miroslav Filipović. They reasoned that gunfire would alert the inhabitants of the targeted villages and help them flee, so it was decided that the killings would be done with blunt instruments and bladed weapons. Between 3:00 a.m. and 4:00 a.m. on 7 February, the Ustaše attacked the villages, as well as the nearby Rakovac mine. An estimated 2,370 Serbs were killed in the ensuing massacre. The killings were so brutal that reportedly even some local Ustaše officials were left horrified. "For Gutić", Latinović and Ožegović write, "this crime was the culmination of his entire policy since April 1941".

=== Transfer to Karlovac and slide into disfavour ===
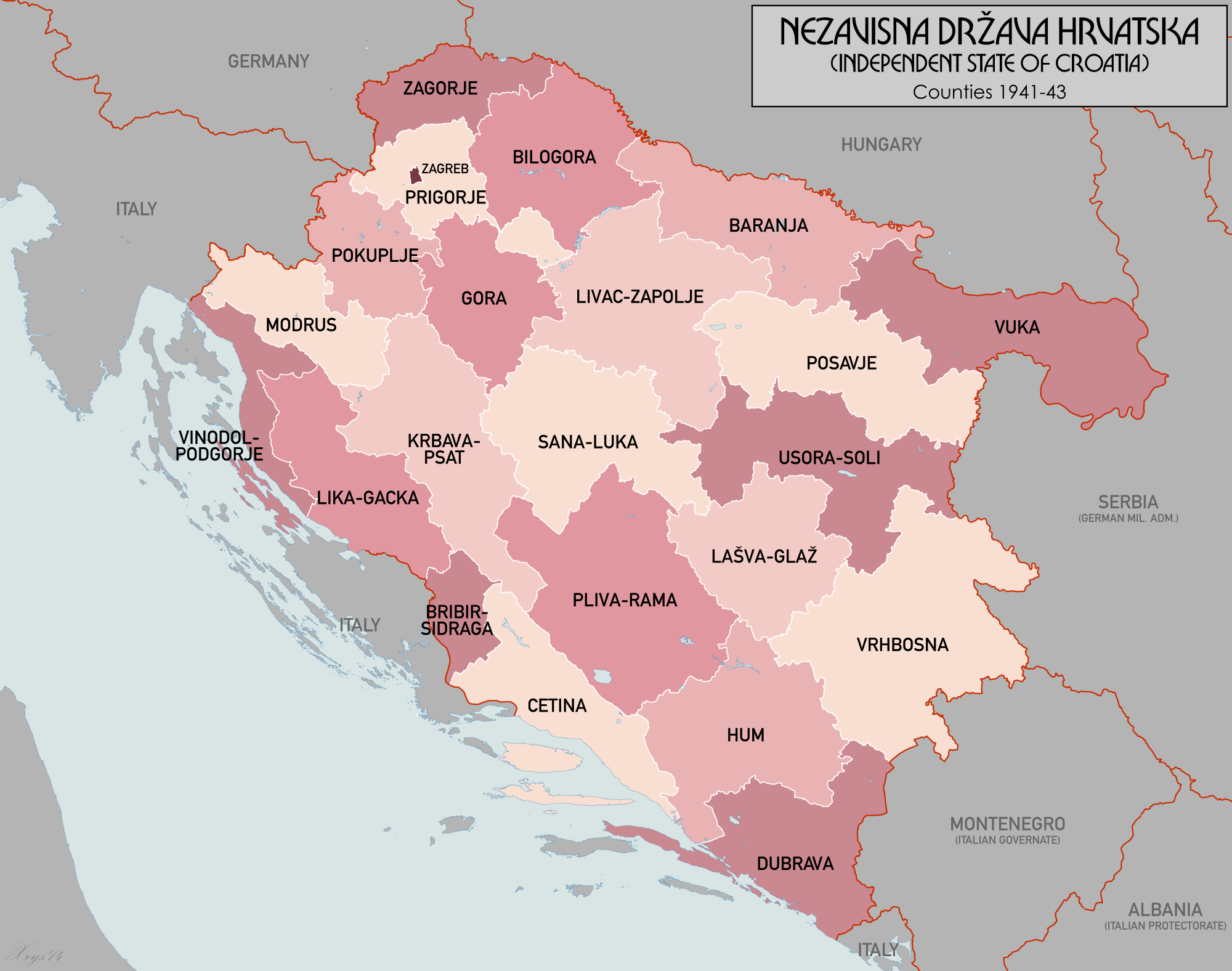
Administrative divisions of the NDH, 1941–1943

In March 1942, Gutić succeeded Ante Nikšić as the Grand Prefect of Pokuplje, whose administrative centre was situated in Karlovac. He formally assumed the position on 10 April, the first anniversary of the NDH's establishment. Gutić soon began persecuting the Serb population there, prompting the Germans to warn him against such actions.

On 10 August 1942, Gutić requested to be relieved of his duties on health grounds. Around this time, his brother Blaž was arrested for disorderly conduct by the NDH authorities and taken to Zagreb. After spending three days in jail, he was released on the understanding that he would not return to Banja Luka. The historian Nikica Barić speculates that Gutić's sudden departure due to ill health was merely a pretence to disguise the fact that he had been forced to resign. Gutić formally relinquished his post as Grand Prefect of Pokuplje in early September. He was succeeded by the lawyer Nikola Tusun, who had previously overseen the Grand Prefecture of Lašva–Glaž, centred around Travnik. Gutić's brother soon convinced the authorities to allow him to return to Banja Luka, but his unruly behaviour once again led him into conflict with local officials. In October 1942, Gutić sent a letter to the Speaker of the Croatian Parliament, Marko Došen, protesting the treatment to which his brother had been subjected by the newly appointed Grand Prefect Dragutin Hadrović, and complaining that their mother had been evicted from her Banja Luka apartment. Shortly thereafter, the Catholic Bishop of Banja Luka, Josip Garić, wrote Došen a similar letter appealing for the Gutić brothers to be granted a reprieve because of their devotion to the Ustaše cause.

Gutić was promoted to the rank of colonel within the Croatian Armed Forces in March 1943. On 8 July, Hadrović was killed in a mail bomb explosion, which Gutić and his followers were widely rumoured to have been behind. Despite German intelligence reports which suggested Pavelić would appoint Gutić to succeed Hadrović, the position instead went to Husein Alić, a secondary school teacher from Sarajevo.

In September 1944, Gutić's brother Blaž was captured by the Yugoslav Partisans near Banja Luka and court-martialled by the Partisan 5th Corps, which found him guilty of war crimes and sentenced him to death. He was hanged in Sanski Most on 16 October. After the collapse of the NDH in May 1945, Gutić fled first to Allied-occupied Austria and then to Italy.

== Arrest, trial and execution ==
In July or August 1945, a Jewish refugee named Mosko Kabiljo, who before the war had been a registry clerk in the County Financial Directorate in Banja Luka, recognized Gutić and Butorac sitting in a restaurant on the Piazza San Marco in Venice. Kabiljo then alerted a group of patrolling Allied soldiers, who promptly arrested the two men. (Note: One contemporary record notes that Gutić and Butorac were arrested on 29 July, whilst another states that their arrests took place "around" 21 August.) Gutić was then transferred to an Allied prison camp in Grottaglie, where he was held alongside Slovene general Leon Rupnik and Chetnik commander Dobroslav Jevđević. The British were initially hesitant to extradite Gutić, but came under increasing pressure after the Yugoslav press published a picture of Gutić and Butorac on the Piazza San Marco, which led to a diplomatic spat between the two countries. Ultimately, the British relented and agreed to hand Gutić over. The exact date of his extradition is unclear, though different sources point to 11 February, 6 March and 9 May 1946. Unlike Gutić, Butorac escaped custody—reportedly by bribing his guards. He later settled in Argentina.

Upon reaching Banja Luka, Gutić was placed in solitary confinement at the local headquarters of the Directorate for State Security (Serbo-Croatian: Uprava državne bezbednosti, UDBA), and restrained to keep him from committing suicide. Two UDBA officials, Šemso Tabaković and Mikan Marjanović, conducted the interrogation, where Gutić insisted that although he had been "placed in awkward situations" from time to time, he "committed no acts which should ... be subjected to criminal prosecution". He maintained that his earlier incitements to violence were not directed at all Serbs, but against the Serbian bourgeoise, prompting one of his incredulous interrogators to joke that it was a wonder he had not joined the Partisans. Gutić's final statement for the record was a rant that ended with a gloomy prediction about the fate of the South Slavs in a future third world war.

At a hearing held on 22 September 1946, Gutić denied any involvement in the Drakulić massacre, attributing it to Filipović and claiming he found out about it only the following day. In June, Filipović had been convicted of war crimes and hanged. In November, Gutić's case was merged with those of two of his former subordinates, Feliks Neđelski and Nikola Bilogrivić. On 25 December, the Banja Luka county prosecutor's office charged Gutić, Neđelski and Bilogrivić with crimes against the people, cooperation with the occupying forces, terrorism and treason. The charges against Gutić included persecution with the "intent to destroy the Serbian people" of Drakulić and its surroundings. The same day, prosecutor Veljko Đorđević requested that the Supreme Court of Bosnia and Herzegovina appoint a special tribunal for the trial of Gutić, Neđelski and Bilogrivić. On 24 January 1947, the Supreme Court assumed jurisdiction.

On 1 February 1947, Gutić, Neđelski and Bilogrivić's trial commenced at the former headquarters of the Sokol recreational society, one of the few buildings in Banja Luka large enough to host the proceedings, which attracted a considerable amount of public interest. Gutić pleaded not guilty, claiming "he did not remember much" and that he had been "a mere tool at the hands of those above him, often unaware of the actions of those below him." On 9 February, the prosecution rested its case. Two days later, Gutić, Neđelski and Bilogrivić were found guilty and sentenced to death—Gutić by hanging, and Neđelski and Bilogrivić by firing squad. The verdict was met with "wild applause". A police officer who witnessed the three men being led out of the courtroom later recalled: "The whole town was there ... They wanted the sentence to be carried out then and there, on the street, with their own feet!" The defendants appealed their convictions, but on 17 February, their appeals were rejected. Gutić was brought to the scaffold at the break of dawn, at 5:00 a.m. on 20 February 1947, on the grounds of the former military barracks in what is now the Borik neighbourhood of Banja Luka; his fear was so great that he had to be carried to the gallows. Many citizens of Banja Luka had come to witness his execution, and after he was hanged, one of the executioners exclaimed: "It's finished. Gutić came from the abyss. We have thrown him back into it."

== Legacy ==
Dulić describes Gutić as "one of the most infamous" Ustaše leaders. He was, in the words of author Slavko Goldstein, "a resolute advocate and strident executor of genocidal terror". Gutić is noted for being among the first on record to use the term "cleansing" (Serbo-Croatian: čišćenje) as a euphemism for mass murder. The scholar Rebecca Knuth comments that the memory of his atrocities still resonated with many Serbs in the lead-up to the Yugoslav Wars, decades after World War II had ended. Most modern historians agree that, throughout the war, the Ustaše killed more than 300,000 Serbs, or about 17 percent of all Serbs living in the NDH.

The street in Banja Luka which during the war carried Gutić's name had several different names under socialist Yugoslavia before finally being renamed Jevrejska ulica (Jewish Street) after the country's dissolution in the 1990s. In 1993, construction began on the Cathedral of Christ the Saviour in Banja Luka, which stood at the exact location as the Cathedral of the Holy Trinity which Gutić had ordered demolished. On 21 May 2000, Bishop Platon—whom Gutić's subordinates had murdered in May 1941―was canonized by the Serbian Orthodox Church. The Cathedral of Christ the Saviour was officially consecrated in 2004.

== See also ==
- Ljubomir Kvaternik
