= Kvaternik =

Kvaternik is a surname. Notable people with the surname include:

- Dido Kvaternik (1910–1962), also Eugen Dido Kvaternik, Croatian Ustaše General-Lieutenant, son of Slavko Kvaternik
- Eugen Kvaternik (1825–1871), Croatian nationalist politician
  - Eugen Kvaternik Square, a square in Zagreb, Croatia
- Slavko Kvaternik (1878–1947), Croatian military commander, one of the founders of Ustaše, father of Dido Kvaternik and brother of Petar Milutin Kvaternik
- Petar Milutin Kvaternik (1882–1941), Croatian politician, brother of Slavko Kvaternik
- Zvonimir Kvaternik (1918–1994), American football player
