= Drakulić, Banja Luka =

Drakulić Дракулић (Serbian)
- Village (Selo)
- Interactive map of Drakulić
- Location within Bosnia and Herzegovina
- Country: Bosnia and Herzegovina
- Entity: Republika Srpska
- Municipality: Banja Luka

Population (2013)
  - Total: 1,299
- Time zone: UTC+1 (CET)
  - Summer (DST): UTC+2 (CEST)

Drakulić (Serbian Cyrillic: Дракулић) is a village in the municipality of Banja Luka, Republika Srpska, Bosnia and Herzegovina.

== History ==
In February 1942, the Ustaše under Miroslav Filipović's command massacred 2,300 adults and 550 children in the Serb-populated villages of Drakulić, Motike and Šargovac. The children were chosen as the first victims and their body parts were cut off.
