= Ljubomir Kvaternik =

Croatian fascist official (1887−1980)

Grand Prefect of Krbava−Psat
- In office 15/16 June 1941 – 14 September 1941
- Preceded by: Office established
- Succeeded by: Josip Barišić

Personal details
- Born: 6 April 1887 Vučinići, Kingdom of Croatia-Slavonia, Austria-Hungary
- Died: 1980 (aged 92–93) Munich, West Germany
- Relatives: Slavko Kvaternik (brother); Petar Milutin Kvaternik (brother); Dido Kvaternik (nephew)
- Occupation: Agriculturalist

Ljubomir Kvaternik (1887−1980) was a Croatian Ustaše official who served as the Grand Prefect (Croatian: veliki župan) of the Grand Prefecture of Krbava−Psat in the World War II Axis puppet state known as the Independent State of Croatia (NDH).

A member of the prominent Kvaternik family, which distinguished itself through its oversized contribution to the Ustaše cause, Ljubomir was appointed as the grand prefect by NDH leader Ante Pavelić in early June 1941. Within days of assuming his post, he ordered the deportation of Serbs and Jews from Bihać, the grand prefecture's administrative centre. On 28 June, he ordered the destruction of the town's Serbian Orthodox church, and on 1 July, the killing of as many as 300 Serb civilians in the village of Suvaja. From June to October, 7,000–12,000 Serb, Jewish and Romani civilians were executed on his orders at the Garavice killing grounds on the outskirts of Bihać. These and other killings eventually resulted in the outbreak of the Srb uprising in late July 1941, which led to Kvaternik being dismissed by Pavelić that September.

In September 1941, Kvaternik survived a rebel ambush in Kordun. He was later transferred to the NDH Ministry of Internal Affairs in Banja Luka before relocating once again to Zagreb. He suffered another reversal of fortunes in October 1942, when his brother and nephew were purged under German pressure and exiled to Slovakia. After the collapse of the NDH in May 1945, he fled to Germany and settled on the outskirts of Munich, where he lived until his death in 1980.

== Early life ==
Ljubomir Kvaternik was born in the village of Vučinići, near Vrbovsko, on 6 April 1887, in what was then Austria-Hungary. He was the brother of future Ustaše members Slavko and Petar Milutin Kvaternik, and the uncle of Dido Kvaternik, who also went on to become a senior Ustaše official. Ljubomir completed his post-secondary education in Križevci in 1910. From 1919 to 1921, he worked in the Ministry of Agrarian Reform of the Kingdom of Serbs, Croats and Slovenes, which was later renamed the Kingdom of Yugoslavia. Beginning in 1925, he worked as an agriculturalist in Bjelovar and Osijek. He retired in 1936 as an agricultural consultant for the Sava Banate and later settled in Zagreb.

== World War II ==
=== Early months of the NDH ===
On 10 April 1941, amidst the Axis invasion of Yugoslavia, Ljubomir's brother Slavko took to Radio Zagreb to announce the establishment of the Axis puppet state known as the Independent State of Croatia (Croatian: Nezavisna država Hrvatska; NDH). The same day, his other brother, Petar Milutin, was killed by a Royal Yugoslav Navy officer while attempting to seize a government building in the coastal town of Crikvenica.

On 3 June 1941, NDH leader Ante Pavelić appointed Ljubomir as the Grand Prefect (Croatian: veliki župan) of the Grand Prefecture of Krbava−Psat, which encompassed much of northwestern Bosnia and parts of Lika. The grand prefecture was further subdivided into the kotars of Bihać, Bosanska Krupa, Bosanski Petrovac, Cazin and Donji Lapac. Kvaternik formally assumed the position on 15 or 16 June. (Note: The earlier date is given by the academic Franjo Jurić. Bergholz places it the following day.) Salih Hadžalić was named as his deputy. Kvaternik was accompanied to the grand prefecture's administrative capital of Bihać by a number of other Ustaše officials, among them Enver Kapetanović, Petar Šimić and Jakov Džal, some of whom had been in exile before the NDH's creation. The area had seen little persecution of non-Croats prior to early June, which was viewed with disapproval by Pavelić, who regarded the region's prior Ustaše leadership as being "too moderate". The historian Max Bergholz writes that Kvaternik's appointment "exemplified a major shift in the region toward radicalization." Accordingly, Kvaternik dismissed local commune leader (Croatian: logornik) Ivan Bunić and named Šimić as his replacement. Vicko Dračevac, the chief of the Bihać kotar who had reportedly allowed a former Royal Yugoslav Army commander to escape from Ustaše custody, was replaced by Džal.

=== Deportations ===
A decree signed by Kvaternik prohibiting Serbs' freedom of movement, 20 June 1941

On 20 June, Kvaternik ordered the expulsion from Bihać of all Serbs and Jews, who were accused of damaging the "honour of the Croatian homeland and Croat nation." The following day, the commander of the Italian forces stationed in Bosanski Petrovac, lieutenant colonel (Italian: Tenente colonnello) Lohengrin Giraud, became indignant on learning of the summary execution of a group of Serbs that he was assured would be given a fair trial. He requested an urgent meeting with the local NDH representative, Branko Crnić, who then consulted with Kvaternik about what should be done. Kvaternik instructed him to ignore Giraud and continue as before, which Bergholz interprets as evidence of the top−down nature of the mass violence in the territory under Kvaternik's command.

From 20 to 23 June, Kvaternik issued decrees in which he forbade all Orthodox Christians from coming within 15 kilometres (9.3 mi) of Bihać and its surroundings, and threatened "undesirable elements" with deportation to detention camps. At 5:00 a.m. the following morning, those who decided to voluntarily abide by Kvaternik's order from several days prior were loaded onto buses, but not before the Ustaše took most of their money and valuables, as well as the keys to their houses and apartments. Half were deported to the village of Kulen Vakuf, some 50 kilometres (31 mi) away, whilst the other half were deported to various Serb villages around Bosanski Petrovac. This marked the start of the ethnic cleansing of the Serbs of the Bihać district. Friar Viktor Šakić had printed certificates attesting to the conversion of local Serbs to Roman Catholicism, which was intended to instill them with equal rights, but they were deported nevertheless. The deportations were characterized by a high degree of "disorganization and improvisation", which according to Bergholz, suggests Kvaternik's immediate initial objective was plunder.

=== Mass killings ===
As Kvaternik's deportations descended into chaos, the Ustaše increasingly took to killing members of the region's Serb population, irrespective of age or gender. Mass executions in and around Bihać commenced on 23 June, the day after the Axis invasion of the Soviet Union, codenamed Operation Barbarossa. Victims were rounded up and transported by truck to execution sites, where they were killed mainly with knives, but also with firearms. One Ustaše executioner later recounted: "You arrange the victims one after the other in a straight line; then, you put a bar on their heads. If someone is a little bigger, you hit him on the head with a hammer to make him bend over, and that's how you get a straight row of heads. Then you shoot the first one in his temple, and the bullet goes through ten skulls. That's how you save shells..." From June to October 1941, 7,000–12,000 Serb, Jewish and Romani civilians were executed on Kvaternik's orders at the Garavice killing grounds on the outskirts of Bihać.

On 28 June (the Serbian Orthodox religious feast of Vidovdan), Kvaternik ordered that the Serbian Orthodox church in Bihać be destroyed. The town's mayor, Abdulah Ibrahimpašić, expressed opposition to the order and said he would only abide by it if nearby Catholic churches and mosques were destroyed as well. According to Bergholz, Ibrahimpašić was immediately replaced and the destruction of the church continued as planned. In contrast, the academic Franjo Jurić writes that Ibrahimpašić tendered his resignation in July and joined the communist resistance. Kvaternik then ordered a purge which led to the arrest of fifty of the former mayor's supporters. Afterwards, Kvaternik appointed Murat Ibrahimpašić, a prominent pre-war Croatian Peasant Party activist, as the county commissioner.

In late June 1941, several local Ustaše officials reported that they had been shot at while driving between the villages of Suvaja and Srb, describing the assailants as "bandits" and "Chetniks". Rumours quickly spread that the officials had not only been shot at, but that they had been decapitated and their heads impaled on stakes. On 1 July, Kvaternik ordered 300–400 Ustaše and Home Guards to descend on Suvaja. (Note: Bergholz is the source of the lower figure. The journalist and Holocaust survivor Slavko Goldstein states that Luburić had about 150 members of the Ustaše Auxiliary Force at his disposal, in addition to 250 Home Guards.) The group was commanded by Vjekoslav Luburić. Over the next few hours, they killed as many as 300 men, women and children and set about 25 houses ablaze. One ten-year-old survivor, whose mother and younger brother were killed, recalled watching as the Ustaše burned down his neighbour's house while shouting "Beat down the Chetniks!" and "Fuck their mothers!" One group of villagers was burned alive, around 170 others were pushed into three nearby ravines and the remaining victims were stabbed to death, including two pregnant women whose fetuses were reportedly pried from their wombs. One was the pregnant widow of a Serbian Orthodox priest whom the Ustaše had previously killed. Such violence, which Bergholz compares to that seen in lynchings in the United States and the Rwandan genocide, was intended to terrorize the men of the village, most of whom had fled to the surrounding forests. Afterwards, the Ustaše plundered the homes that had not yet been torched and stole a considerable amount of livestock, the villagers' primary source of subsistence. (Note: In an attempt to justify the massacre, Kvaternik claimed that 500 Chetniks armed with "modern weapons", with the support of about 2,500 locals, had launched an uprising against the NDH. He asserted that, after a three-hour battle, fifty Chetniks had been killed and 15 captured. One of his commanders remarked that "a small number of women and children" had been killed due to their own "lack of attention and fear" and claimed that it was "the Chetniks [who] set about ten [houses] on fire when fleeing from our forces." However, a Home Guard delegation that visited Suvaja the following week issued a report that read: "It appears that the information of ... [Ljubomir Kvaternik] and the local Ustaša authorities about the organized Chetnik activities and disorder was exaggerated.")

=== Dismissal ===
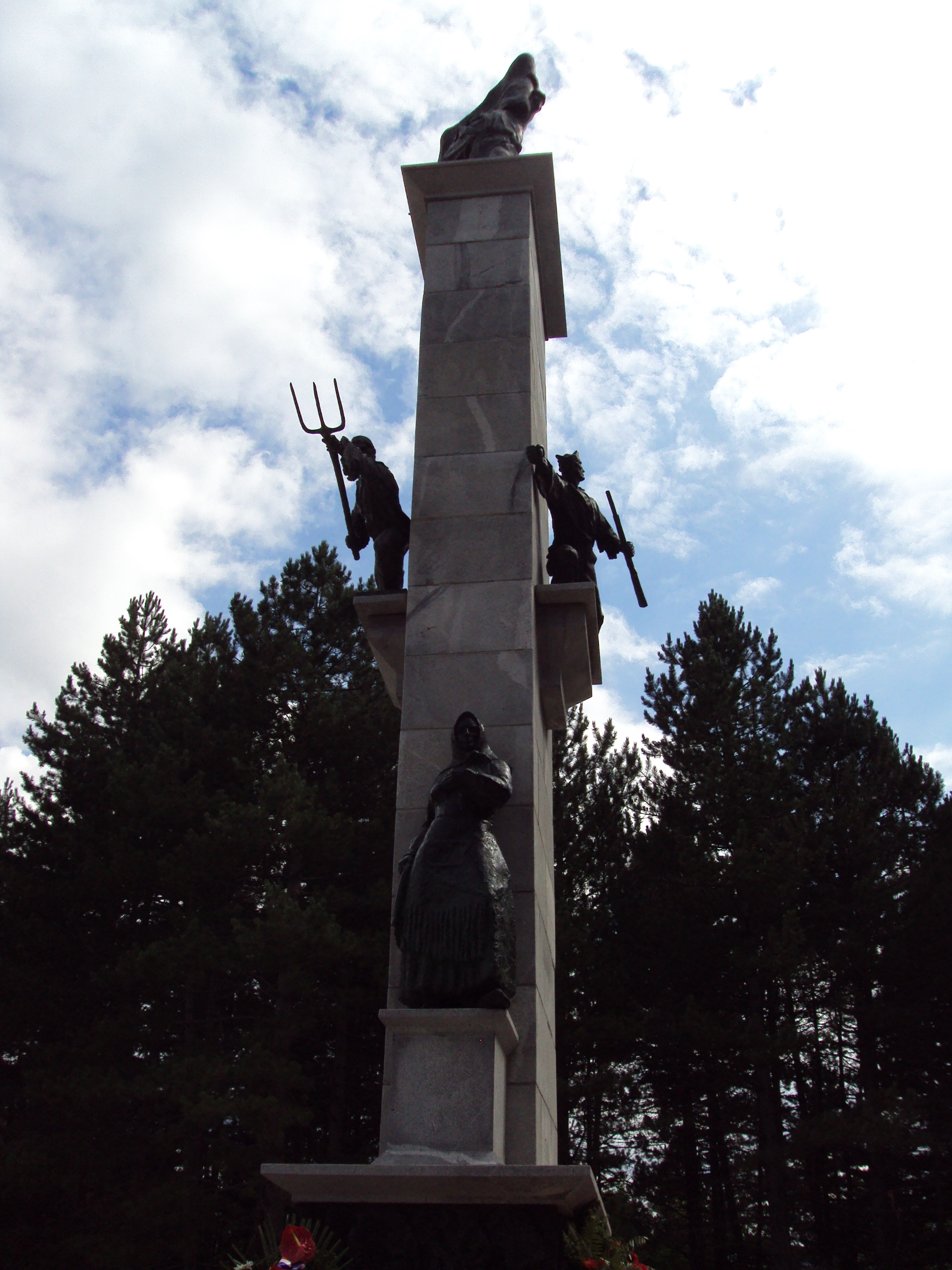
Monument in Srb commemorating the Srb uprising of July 1941

As the atrocities in and around Bihać increased in scope and scale, Friar Šakić began writing reports critical of Kvaternik's actions to the Roman Catholic bishop of Banja Luka, Josip Garić. The latter said nothing publicly, presumably because he did not wish to incur the wrath of Kvaternik's powerful brother Slavko and his nephew Dido. Privately, Garić appears to have encouraged Šakić to arrange for a meeting with Pavelić in Zagreb, which took place on 11 September. According to the historian Milan Vukmanović, Pavelić disliked Kvaternik and was looking for any reason to replace him; Šakić's complaints provided him with a convenient excuse. Jurić adds that the actions of Ustaše officials such as Kvaternik and Viktor Gutić were major contributors to the outbreak of the Srb uprising in late July 1941, and that the heavy casualties the NDH subsequently incurred played a major role in both men's dismissal. Upon receiving word of Pavelić's decision, Kvaternik paid a visit to his office in Zagreb, accompanied by several Ustaše functionaries from Bihać, and unsuccessfully attempted to persuade him to reconsider. On 14 September, Kvaternik formally relinquished the post to his successor, Josip Barišić. Father Ivan Nikšić, himself a wartime Ustaše functionary who was likely executed in 1945, later described Kvaternik's rule in Bihać as "one of the regrettable episodes in Croatian history," elaborating that, "His entire effort, instead of building the young state, consisted of butchering and killing the Orthodox and stealing their property. He himself stated that in Slunj he killed more than ten thousand of them."

On 17 September, a convoy in which Kvaternik was riding was ambushed in the Kordun region, between Slunj and Rakovica. Three members of the Gendarmerie, one police officer and a driver were killed, and three members of the Gendarmerie were wounded, as was Bihać county police chief Krunoslav Batušić, who sustained serious injuries. Afterwards, Kvaternik was transferred to the NDH Ministry of Internal Affairs in Banja Luka, where he lived until 4 March 1942, at which point he relocated to Zagreb. In October 1942, his brother Slavko and nephew Dido were removed from their posts and exiled to Slovakia on the insistence of the Germans, who regarded their unrelenting persecution of Serbs as being detrimental to Germany's interests in the region. The following month, the Yugoslav Partisans liberated Bihać from the Ustaše. The extermination of the town's Serbs was so thorough that when the Partisans entered it, only forty were still alive from a pre-war population of 3,000.

== Exile and death ==
After the collapse of the NDH in May 1945, Kvaternik fled to Germany and settled on the outskirts of Munich. His brother Slavko was executed by Yugoslavia's victorious new communist government in June 1945 and his nephew Dido settled in Argentina after the war, dying in an automobile accident there in 1962. Kvaternik lived in Munich until his death in 1980.

A monument commemorating those executed at Garavice, designed by the architect Bogdan Bogdanović, was unveiled at the site of the killings in 1981. Over the subsequent decades, the monument fell into a state of disrepair, and in March 2023 it was reported that it had been turned into an improvised dog shelter. In response, the government of the Federation of Bosnia and Herzegovina's Una-Sana Canton announced it would "take all the necessary measures" to rectify the situation.

== See also ==
- Josip Bujanović, Ustaše Grand Prefect of Lika from 1944 to 1945 who later immigrated to Australia
- Dragutin Kamber, Ustaše Grand Prefect of Doboj in 1941 who later immigrated to Canada
