= Josip Bujanović =

Croatian fascist official

Grand Prefect of Lika
- In office December 1944 – April 1945

Personal details
- Born: 1 January 1914 Zavalje, Kingdom of Croatia-Slavonia, Austria-Hungary
- Died: 14 August 2001 (aged 87) Adelaide, Australia
- Party: Ustaše
- Profession: Catholic priest
- Awards: Silver Medal of Poglavnik Ante Pavelić for Bravery
- Nickname: Father Jole

Josip Bujanović (1 January 1914 – 14 August 2001) was a Croatian Catholic priest and high-ranking Ustaše official in the World War II Axis puppet state known as the Independent State of Croatia (NDH). Following the Axis invasion of Yugoslavia in April 1941, he played a leading role in establishing the ruling structures of the NDH in Lika, a region with a mixed Serb and Croat population. The Yugoslav War Crimes Commission found that many of the worst atrocities committed in Lika took place during the last six months of the war, when he was the region's Grand Prefect.

As the war drew to a close, Bujanović fled to Italy, became a senior figure in the Crusaders guerrilla network and assisted the Catholic priest Krunoslav Draganović in operating the ratlines which smuggled Axis officials out of Eastern and Central Europe, most notably NDH leader Ante Pavelić and former Jasenovac concentration camp commander Dinko Šakić. In the late 1940s or early 1950s, Bujanović immigrated to Argentina, where he lived for some time before relocating to Australia in 1964. He became the subject of a war crimes investigation in Australia in 1987 but was never indicted and died in Adelaide in 2001.

== Early life ==
Josip Bujanović was born in the village of Zavalje, near Bihać, on 1 January 1914. At the time of his birth, the village was within the jurisdiction of Croatia-Slavonia, a nominally autonomous kingdom within Austria-Hungary, but it is now located in Bosnia and Herzegovina. He completed his primary and secondary education in Bihać, after which he enrolled in the Roman Catholic seminary in Senj. He was ordained a priest in 1938 and presided over his first mass in Zavalje on 15 July of that year. Prior to the outbreak of World War II in Yugoslavia, he served as a parish priest in the villages of Bribir, Križpolje and Brinje.

== World War II ==
Following the Axis invasion of Yugoslavia in April 1941, Bujanović played an active role in establishing the ruling structures of the emerging Axis puppet state known as the Independent State of Croatia (Croatian: Nezavisna država Hrvatska; NDH) in Lika, a region with a mixed Serb and Croat population. To this end, he helped the fascist, Croatian nationalist Ustaše movement seize power in Brinje and its surroundings. In November 1942, he was appointed as the chaplain of the Croatian Home Guard's 3rd Conscript Regiment, holding the rank of captain (Croatian: satnik). In late 1942, he was assigned to a Croatian Air Force anti-aircraft unit. He was soon transferred to Lika and participated in the defence of Gospić from the Yugoslav Partisans in May 1943. (Note: Dujmović writes that Bujanović was appointed as the acting Grand Prefect of Lika and Gacka in April 1943, and assumed the position fully in September. However, this contradicts the summary of Bujanović's career progression provided by authors Zdravko Dizdar and Milan Pojić.) For this, he was awarded the silver Medal of Poglavnik Ante Pavelić for Bravery.

On 14 September 1943, shortly after the Capitulation of Italy, Bujanović led about 500 armed Security Police into the town of Otočac, after which around twelve badly wounded Partisans were executed in the local hospital. Most were killed with axes and knives, while the rest were shot. A doctor at the hospital later recalled seeing its walls covered in blood. Among the other locations where Bujanović is alleged to have ordered mass executions were Mogorić, Divoselo, Raduč, Lički Osik, Gacka, as well as Gospić itself. (Note: The atrocities in Mogorić took place in May 1944, those in Osik took place in June 1944 and those in Raduč took place in December 1944.) In November 1943, Bujanović commanded a raid on Divoselo during which a number of villagers were killed. Four were publicly hanged, among them three children, and two others were burned alive. Six months later, he commanded a similar raid in the village of Kurjak, during which at least eleven civilians were killed, among them a two-year-old girl and an eleven-year-old girl. However, most of the villagers were able to escape to the hills. Gospić was the epicentre of the mass killings that Bujanović oversaw, particularly between October 1943 and October 1944. On 9 October 1944, a military operation was launched in Gacka in which 100 men and 20 women were arrested and interned in the local jail, where many were subsequently tortured to death or died of hunger. Many of those who survived were hanged. Bujanović quickly rose through the Ustaše movement's ranks due to his role in these killings. In the fall of 1944, he was promoted to the rank of major (Croatian: bojnik). In December, he was named as the Grand Prefect (Croatian: veliki župan) of the Grand Prefecture of Lika and Gacka. This meant that the regional Security Police structure was subordinated directly to him, effectively making him the chief overseer of the NDH's machinery of repression in Lika alongside his police chief, Stipe Stilinović. The Yugoslav War Crimes Commission found that many of the worst atrocities committed in Lika took place during the last six months of the war, when Bujanović was the region's Grand Prefect.

On 14 February 1945, twenty anti-fascists were publicly hanged on Bujanović's orders in reprisal for an earlier Partisan attack in which one young man was killed and another captured. The victims of the hanging, twelve males and eight females ranging in age from 14 to 69, were entirely unconnected to the attack, but were condemned to die anyway because they had supposedly engaged in "anti-state activity". On 4 April, Bujanović personally oversaw a raid in Gacka, during which he ordered his police officers to pick up a sick and elderly woman and drag her away to be killed. The same day, one of his senior police officers in Gospić machine-gunned a group of prisoners in the basement of the local jail. When the Partisans captured Gospić and its surroundings later that month, Bujanović retreated towards Senj and Sušak, but immediately returned to the area around Brinje with a group of other Ustaše. On 25 April 1945, he submitted a report to NDH prime minister Nikola Mandić in Zagreb, in which he proposed waging a guerrilla war in Lika.

== Post-war period ==
=== Crusaders, ratlines and immigration to Argentina ===
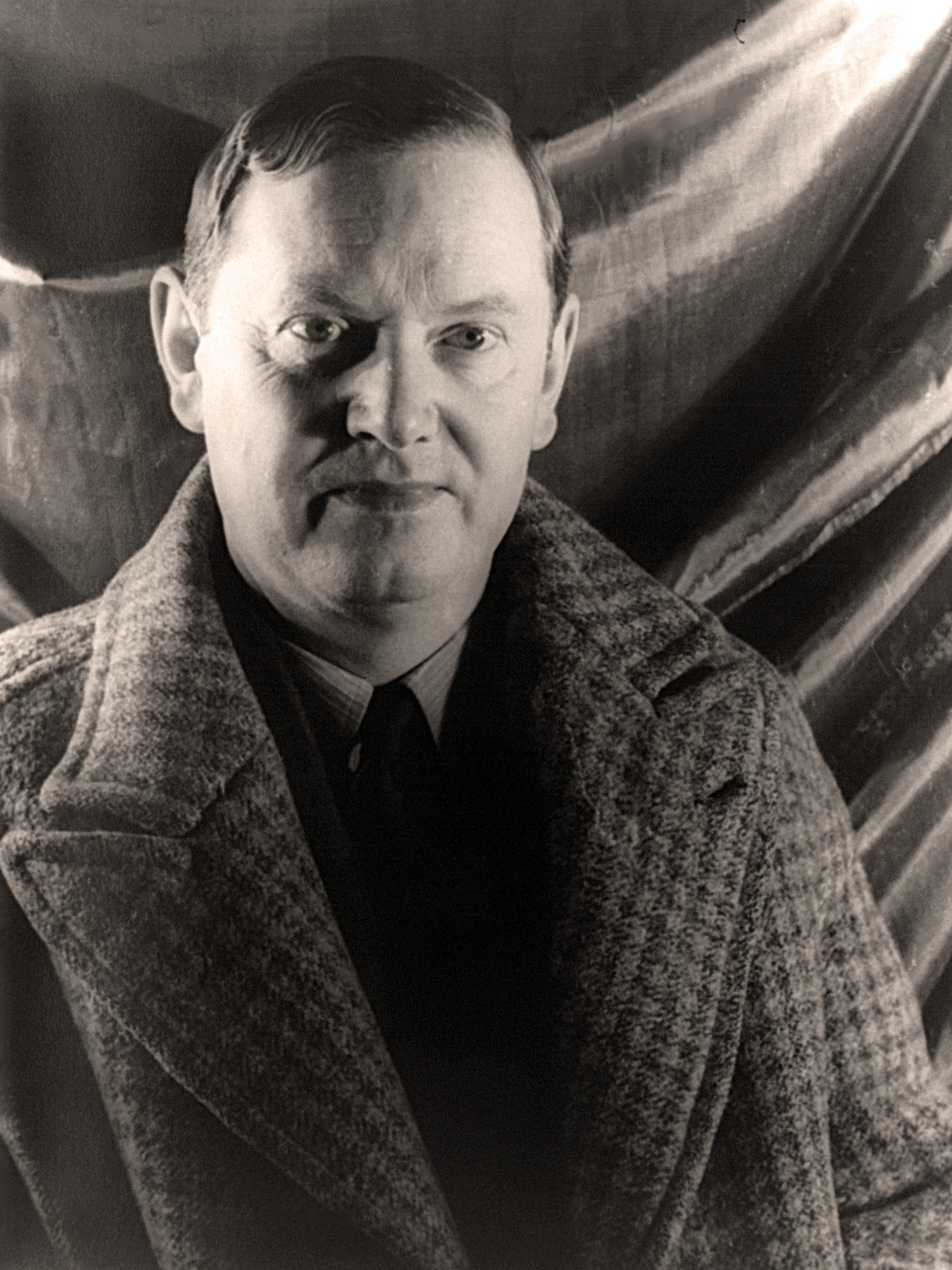
Writer Evelyn Waugh, a British Army captain during World War II, gave credence to reports that Bujanović had committed war crimes

Bujanović left Zagreb on 5 May 1945, as the NDH collapsed before the advancing Partisans. He first retreated to Austria with the rest of the puppet state's government. Upon reaching Italy, he was detained at the Fermo displaced persons camp, where he organized a choir for the internees. In 1946, he led a group of Croatian exiles who were granted an audience with Pope Pius XII at the Vatican. The pretext for the visit may have been a performance by the Fermo displaced persons choir. That October, the Yugoslav government presented some of the evidence of Bujanović's crimes to the British and American authorities, and requested that he be arrested and extradited. On 18 March 1947, the British government agreed that the evidence against him was persuasive enough to warrant his extradition. In making this determination, the British Foreign Office relied partly on the testimony of Captain Evelyn Waugh, who had served with the British military mission to Tito in the second half of the war. Waugh had investigated Bujanović's activities in Gospić and concluded that "he is credibly reported to have taken a hand in the massacre of Orthodox peasants."

After the war, Bujanović became a senior figure in the Crusaders guerrilla network, working directly under Božidar Kavran and Lovro Sušić. Operating under the diplomatic immunity conferred to him by the Holy See, he also helped establish the post-war ratlines and worked with the Croatian Catholic priest Krunoslav Draganović to organize the escape of almost the entire NDH cabinet. Among these was Džafer Kulenović, the vice president of the Croatian State Government, as well as some cabinet ministers and military officers. Undoubtedly the highest-ranking Ustaše official who benefited from these arrangements was Ante Pavelić himself, who managed to reach Argentina in 1948 with assistance from Draganović and Bujanović. That year, Bujanović also arranged for former Jasenovac commander Dinko Šakić to be given shelter at several monasteries near Rome. According to investigative reporter Uki Goñi, Bujanović may have entered Argentina on a Red Cross passport under the name Franjo Bujanović on 29 April 1948. However, according to author Ivan Dujmović, Bujanović remained in Italy until 1951 and entered Argentina through Ecuador, living in Argentina for eight years as an illegal immigrant. In Buenos Aires, Bujanović directed a choir of former Fermo internees. In 1958, he broke his priestly vows and married.

=== Life in Australia ===
In 1964, Bujanović immigrated to Australia and settled in Adelaide. He subsequently became involved with the Croatian Revolutionary Brotherhood (Croatian: Hrvatsko Revolucionarno Bratstvo; HRB), a Croatian nationalist organization based in Australia. In 1976, three Croatian nationalists were tried and convicted of terrorism by a Yugoslav court for accepting funds from Bujanović and the HRB over a period of four years. When the Australian government's Special Investigations Unit (SIU) began its inquiries in 1987, Bujanović was high on its list of suspected war criminals who were living in the country. The SIU conducted a thorough investigation into Bujanović's background and interviewed a number of eyewitnesses. By 1990, however, most of the investigations into the Ustaše exiles living in Australia were suspended, except for those pertaining to Bujanović and Srećko Rover. In the SIU's final report, the investigators stated that they were "satisfied that a number of the allegations against [Bujanović] had substance". However, they did not recommend issuing an indictment because they were not convinced that the evidence against him met the threshold needed to secure a conviction. Bujanović died in Adelaide on 14 August 2001, at the age of 87, and was buried at the Centennial Park Cemetery.

== See also ==
- Božidar Bralo – Franciscan friar and Ustaše official, hanged for war crimes
- Dragutin Kamber – Jesuit priest and Ustaše official who fled to Canada
- Miroslav Filipović – Franciscan friar and Ustaše official, hanged for war crimes
- Ivan Vidnjević – Ustaše "hanging judge", also from Zavalje
