= Ivan Vidnjević =

Croatian judge (1907–1945)

- Born: 1907; Zavalje, Kingdom of Croatia-Slavonia, Austria-Hungary
- Died: 7 June 1945 (aged 37–38); Zagreb, FPR Yugoslavia
- Education: University of Zagreb
- Occupation: Judge
- Relatives: Christopher Vidnjevich (son)

Ivan Vidnjević (1907 – 7 June 1945) was a Croatian judge who presided over the Travelling Summary Court for the district of Zagreb in the Axis puppet state known as the Independent State of Croatia (NDH) during World War II. He oversaw show trials of Serbs, Jews and other "enemies of the state" which invariably resulted in summary execution. By December 1942, he had reportedly "celebrated his 1,500th death sentence". Shortly after the war, he was found guilty of treason and war crimes by a Yugoslav military tribunal and sentenced to death by hanging.

== Biography ==
=== Early life ===
Ivan Vidnjević was born in the village of Zavalje, near the town of Bihać in modern-day Bosnia and Herzegovina. At the time of his birth, the village was located in Croatia-Slavonia, a nominally autonomous kingdom within Austria-Hungary. In some sources, his surname is spelled Vignjević, but according to the scholar Tomislav Jonjić, this is incorrect. (Note: Moreover, it is spelled Vidnjević in his 1945 verdict.) Vidnjević received his law degree from the University of Zagreb's Faculty of Law. Prior to the Axis invasion of Yugoslavia and the establishment of the Axis puppet state known as the Independent State of Croatia (Croatian: Nezavisna država Hrvatska; NDH) in April 1941, he served as a district judge in the town of Zlatar, north of Zagreb.

=== World War II ===
On 24 June 1941, Vidnjević was appointed as the judge presiding over the Travelling Summary Court (Croatian: Pokretni prijeki sud) in Zagreb. He was directly subordinated to Dido Kvaternik, and his salary and travel expenses were covered by the Ustaše Surveillance Service (Croatian: Ustaška nadzorna služba; UNS). "Under his administration, the courts implemented arbitrary justice against Serbs and other "enemies" of the state," the historian Rory Yeomans writes. "This invariably meant a show trial followed by summary execution." Yeomans further characterizes Vidnjević as "fanatical" and describes the one over which he presided as the "most notorious" of the mobile Ustaše courts.

From 23 July to 7 August, Vidnjević presided over a session of the Travelling Summary Court in the town of Karlovac, southwest of Zagreb. On 4 August, he sentenced four named defendants and 98 unnamed Jews and communists to death for allegedly attacking a unit of the Ustaše University Battalion. The latter were described as "co-participants and the intellectual instigators" of the attack. The following day, another 87 Jews and communists were sentenced to death as "additional co-participants and intellectual instigators". Holocaust survivor and researcher Slavko Goldstein observed, "Of course, in two days Vidnjević and his mobile summary court, even with the expedited procedures, could not have questioned, let alone sentenced, a total of 189 suspects, so it is obvious that the procedure involved randomly selected hostages whom the court never saw." By late September 1941, more than 200 Jews from Zagreb had been shot as hostages in mass reprisals rubber-stamped by Vidnjević. Following a prisoners' revolt at the Jasenovac concentration camp in late October or early November 1941 which had been sparked by a reduction in food rations, Vidnjević presided over a session of the Travelling Summary Court in which around 100 inmates from the Krapje (Jasenovac I) sub-camp were sentenced to death. After the sentences were handed down, the prisoners were shot by the Ustaše official Vjekoslav Luburić. In his post-war interrogation, camp commander Ljubo Miloš characterized this incident as "the only liquidation where some attempt was made to provide legal grounds. All other liquidations were carried out without any preceding investigation, trial, or anything of the kind. I think that there were several more trials, but these were only individual cases."

On 28 September 1942, canon Augustin Juretić wrote to Juraj Krnjević, a representative of the Yugoslav government-in-exile in London, that: "Judge Vignjević [sic] of the court-martial has by now sentenced 1,200 people to death." On 3 December, he reported to Krnjević that the judge had "recently celebrated his 1,500th death sentence."

=== Trial and execution ===
As the NDH collapsed in May 1945, Vidnjević retreated to Austria but was soon arrested by the British military. He was extradited to Yugoslavia on 17 May. On 1 June, he was charged with treason and war crimes alongside former NDH Minister of Education and Minister of Foreign Affairs Mile Budak, former NDH Minister of Justice and Religion Pavao Canki, former NDH Minister of Education Julije Makanec, former prime minister Nikola Mandić, Main Ustaša Headquarters council member Ademaga Mešić, chief of Dalmatian civil administration Bruno Nardelli, Minister of the Armed Forces Nikola Steinfel, General Lavoslav Milić and Colonel Juco Rukavina. This was the first major post-war trial of leading NDH officials and the most significant until the trial of the Archbishop of Zagreb, Aloysius Stepinac, in 1946. Vidnjević and his co-defendants were tried before a military tribunal of the Yugoslav Second Army in Zagreb. The presiding judge was a pre-war colleague of Vidnjević, Josip Hrnčević. Lawyer Ivo Politeo was appointed as the defence counsel for eight or nine of the accused, although according to Jonjić and the scholar Stjepan Matković, the extent to which the defendants' rights were taken into consideration is questionable.

During the proceedings, Vidnjević attempted to justify his actions: "I think in Zagreb I sentenced about one thousand people, in Karlovac sixteen, in Petrinja about forty. In these four years, while I was the president of the summary court, I went to confession four times. I told the priests everything that I had done and not one of them told me that what I was doing was wrong." After a trial on 6 June which only lasted several hours, the judges found all the defendants guilty of treason and war crimes. Budak, Rukavina and Vidnjević were sentenced to death by hanging; Mandić, Makanec, Steinfel and Canki were sentenced to death by firing squad; Mešić was sentenced to life imprisonment; and Milić and Nardelli were sentenced to 20 years. The defendants were not permitted to file an appeal. Vidnjević was executed on 7 June.

== Legacy ==
In his book 1941: The Year That Keeps Returning, Slavko Goldstein characterized Vidnjević as "a perfect example of the syntagma of "the banality of evil," the frequently cited phrase by Hannah Arendt from her book Eichmann in Jerusalem." The author Miljenko Jergović describes Vidnjević as one of the two most egregious war criminals among the co-defendants he was tried with, alongside Juco Rukavina, but adds: "Unlike individuals such as Juco Rukavina—occasional criminals, who on other days of the week could be completely ordinary, even good people—men like Ivan Vignjević [sic] were criminals every day of the week and all the months and years during which they carried out their duties."

After the war, Vidnjević's family moved to the United States. His son Christopher Vidnjevich joined George Lincoln Rockwell's American Nazi Party in 1962, at the age of 18, and soon became the head of its Chicago chapter. On 31 July 1966, he organized a counter-demonstration against Martin Luther King Jr.'s Open Housing Marches in Chicago's Marquette Park, in which 50 people were injured and 18 vehicles were set on fire. That November, the neo-Nazi magazine The Stormtrooper published a profile of Christopher in which his father was described as a "patriot" who had died at the hands of "Communist Tito's butchers."

== See also ==
- Hanging judge
- Roland Freisler
- Josip Bujanović, high-ranking Ustaše official, also from Zavalje
