= Drakulić massacre =

Massacre of Serbs by the Ustaše in Croatia during World War II

- Part of World War II in Yugoslavia
- Location: Drakulić, Šargovac and Motike, municipality of Banja Luka, Independent State of Croatia
- Date: 7 February 1942
- Target: Serbs
- Attack type: Ethnic cleansing, mass murder, genocidal massacre
- Deaths: c. 2,300
- Perpetrator: Ustaše
- Motive: Serbophobia, Croatian nationalism, Croatisation

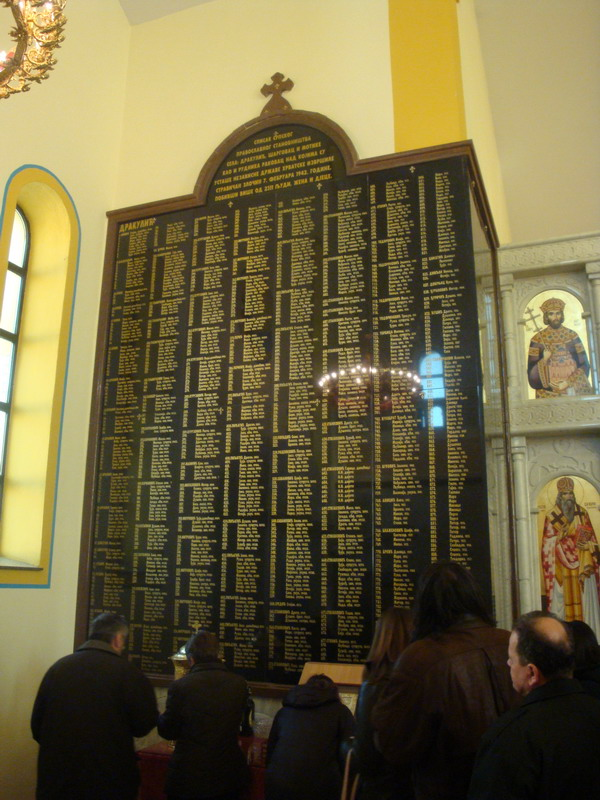
A memorial plaque with the names of those killed on February 7, 1942 in Drakulić, Šargovec, Mortike and the Rakovac mine

The Drakulić massacre was the mass killing of 2,300 Serb civilians by the Croatian fascist Ustaše movement on 7 February 1942, during World War II in the villages of Drakulić, Šargovac and Motike near Banja Luka, which were then part of the Independent State of Croatia (NDH).

== The massacre ==
After the Axis invasion of Yugoslavia, Adolf Hitler set up the Independent State of Croatia (NDH), a puppet state ruled by the fascist Croatian Ustaše regime led by Ante Pavelić. The Ustaše then embarked on a campaign of genocide against the Serb, Jewish and Roma population within the borders of the state.

In the early morning hours of 7 February 1942, an Ustaše unit entered the Rakovac mine near Banja Luka and killed several Serb workers who were sleeping. At around 8 am, another group of Ustaše arrived at the mine for the second shift workers and separated Serbs from the rest, tied their hands behind their backs and massacred them with blunt instruments; 37 in total were killed.

The same Ustaše unit, led by Josip Mišlov and Franciscan monk Miroslav Filipović of the Petrićevac monastery in Banja Luka, gathered into the villages of Drakulić, Šargovac and Motike and slaughtered some 2,300 Serbs, using knives and hatchets. The victims included some 500 children. Surviving witnesses described how Filipović entered one school with a group of Ustaše and selected a Serbian girl, slaughtering her before leaving the rest of the Ustaše to kill the remaining children.

A Wehrmacht commander stationed in the NDH reported to Edmund Glaise-Horstenau on the actions:

About 8 days ago, in the villages of Drakulić and Šargovac, near Banja Luka, some 2,300 people, including many women and children, belonging to the Orthodox population remaining there, were exterminated. To motivate this action, the Ustashe invoked the fact that an act of sabotage directed against the "Laus" coal mine had been planned by the population of these villages. In reality, it was the monks of a neighboring Franciscan convent who were behind this new mass massacre.

Filipović was court-martialed by the Wehrmacht for his involvement, possibly at the request of the Italian Royal Army which was then occupying part of the territory. In late April, his priestly faculties were reportedly suspended by order of the Papal Nuncio in Zagreb and he was jailed. In October, he was transferred to Stara Gradiška, a sub-camp of the Jasenovac concentration camp under the support of Vjekoslav Luburić, where he became notorious for his slaughter of the prisoners.
