= Miroslav Filipović =

Bosnian Croatian Franciscan friar and war criminal

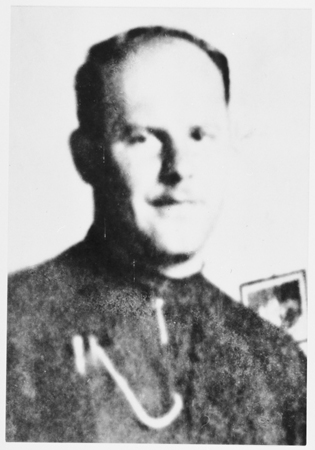
- Miroslav Filipović, c. 1941–45
- Born: June 5, 1915; Jajce, Bosnia and Herzegovina, Austria-Hungary
- Died: June 29, 1946 (aged 31); Zagreb, PR Croatia, FPR Yugoslavia
- Cause of death: Execution by hanging
- Other names: Brother Satan; Devil of Jasenovac
- Known for: Slaughtering inmates at Jasenovac

Ecclesiastical career
- Religion: Catholic Church

Miroslav Filipović (5 June 1915 – 29 June 1946), also known as Tomislav Filipović and Tomislav Filipović-Majstorović, was a Croatian Franciscan friar and Ustaše military chaplain who participated in atrocities during World War II in Yugoslavia. Convicted as a war criminal in a Yugoslav civil court, he was executed by hanging in 1946.

For the duration of the war, the Vatican continued to recognize the Yugoslav Government-in-exile, following the principle of not recognizing new states in time of war. However, it also developed relations with the Independent State of Croatia and was briefed on the efforts of the Ustaše to convert ethnic Serbs to Catholicism. Some former priests, mostly Franciscans, particularly in, but not limited to, Herzegovina and Bosnia, took part in the atrocities themselves. Filipović-Majstorović joined the Ustaše on 7 February 1942, and participated in the Drakulić massacre. He was reportedly subsequently dismissed from his order. He became the Chief Guard of the Jasenovac concentration camp where he was nicknamed "Fra Sotona" ("Brother Satan") due to his sadism. When he was hanged for war crimes, he wore his clerical garb, although he had been reportedly defrocked in 1942.

== Early life ==
Filipović's date of birth was 5 June 1915, but little else about his early years has been recorded. In 1938 he joined the Franciscan Order at Petrićevac monastery, Banja Luka, and took "Tomislav" as his religious name.

In 1941, following establishment of the Independent State of Croatia (NDH), a puppet state installed by the Axis powers embracing Bosnia-Herzegovina as well as most of Croatia by the Ustaše, an organisation of extremist Croatian nationalists, Filipović was assigned to a chaplaincy in the Rama region in northern Herzegovina but did not take up the assignment. In January 1942, after completing his theological exams in Sarajevo, he became a military chaplain with the Ustaša. A report by the State Commission of Croatia for the Investigation of the Crimes of the Occupation Forces and their Collaborators (SCC), marks his acts clearly within the Ustaše members and high ranks.

== Ustaša chaplain ==
Filipović (later known as Tomislav Filipović-Majstorović) was assigned to II Poglavnik Bodyguard Battalion. Statements by two eyewitnesses and a senior German general say that on 7 February 1942, Filipović accompanied elements of his battalion in an operation aimed at wiping out Serbs in the settlement of Drakulić, on the northern outskirts of Banja Luka, and in two neighbouring villages, Motike and Šargovac. A few Serbs survived, but overwhelmingly the operation achieved its objective; more than 2,300 Serb civilians, including men, women and children were killed, usually with axes or pick-axes.

Reports sent to Eugen Dido Kvaternik, head of the state internal security service, from his Banja Luka office and dated 9 and 11 February 1942, noted that the victims at Šargovac included 52 children killed at the village primary school. The first of these reports gives death tolls at the mine, the school and the three villages which together total 2,287. The second revises the death toll at the school from 37 to 52, bringing the toll to 2,302, 13 fewer than the immediately preceding estimate of 2,315.

Filipović was court-martialed by the Wehrmacht for his involvement, possibly at the request of the Italian Royal Army which was then occupying part of the ISC territory. On 4 April 1942, Filipović's priestly faculties were reportedly suspended by order of the Papal Nuncio in Zagreb and he was jailed in Croatia. While there is no evidence that Filipović was ever excommunicated by the Roman Catholic Church, he was expelled from the Order of Friars Minor on 22 October 1942, the date on which he was transferred to Stara Gradiška.

In his testimony to a Croatian state commission set up after World War II to investigate war crimes "by the occupation forces and their collaborators", Filipović alleged that he neither participated in, nor attended, the 7 February massacres. However, General Edmund Glaise-Horstenau, the senior Wehrmacht officer in the region, accused Filipović in a report of being present at a planning meeting prior to the massacres, along with certain other Catholic military chaplains and, "during the slaughtering". General Glaise-Horstenau further alleged that the Ustaša's former mayor of Banja Luka, Viktor Gutić, and the city's Chief justice, a Dr Stilinović, were also present at the meeting.

== Responsibilities at the Jasenovac camps complex ==
=== Appointment ===
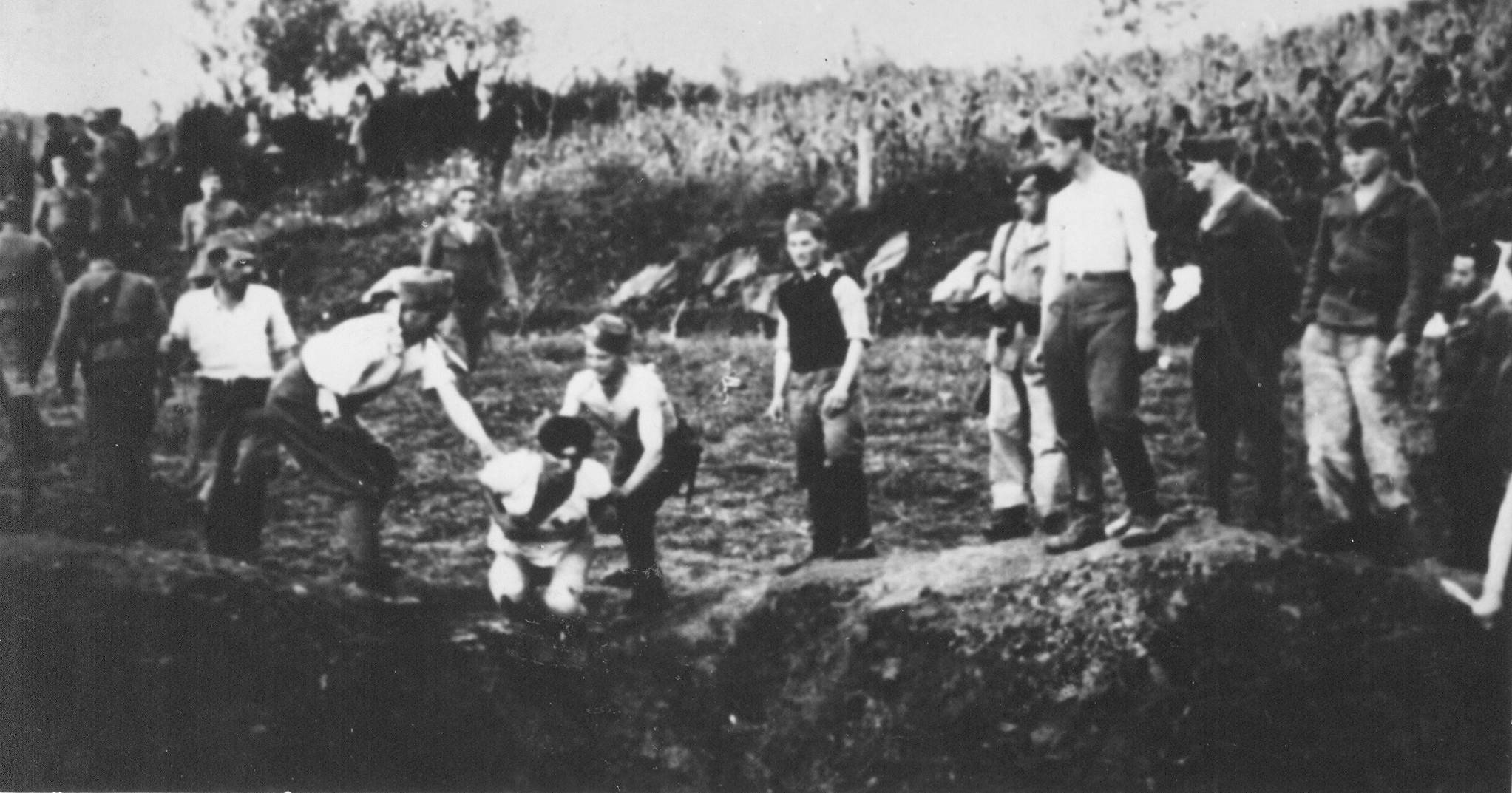
Ustaše execute prisoners near the Jasenovac concentration camp.

Through the direct intervention of Vjekoslav "Maks" Luburić, who then headed Section III of the ISC internal security service (Ustaška nadzorna služba, literally: Ustaše Surveillance Service), which was responsible for administering the puppet state's system of prison camps, Filipović was quickly released and posted to the Jasenovac complex of labour and death camps where he was at first an inmate with benefited status, who aided the Ustase, and later appointed Ustase, commanding a small transit camp near Jasenovac, in early 1942, he reportedly killed an inmate there for hiding a loaf of bread.

Shortly thereafter he became chief-guard, responsible for mass-executions and lieutenant of the commander Ljubo Miloš and administrator Ivica Matković, and later, on 10 June 1942, administrator of the main camp in their stead, until the return of Matković, in March 1943. Luburić gave Filipović a new surname, "Majstorović", derived from a local word meaning "master" or "craftsman". From then on documents referred to him sometimes by that name and sometimes as Filipović-Majstorović. He won an apparent bet placed by him, Marinko Polić and Jerko Maričić, both infamous NCOs in the camp. Witness Josip Riboli stated:

Majstorović, Polić and Maricić competed over which of them was a better butcher. Victims had to kneel in front of them until they were touching their foreheads to the ground, and the executioners would fire their revolvers at the backs of their heads. If death wasn't instant, one of them would grab a knife and slit the victim's throat.

Another particularly vicious killing was described by the former Jewish prisoner, Egon Berger, in his book, "44 months in Jasenovac":

"The priestly face of Fra Majstorovic, all made-up and powdered, dressed in an elegant suit and green hunter's hat, watched with delight the victims. He approached the children, even stroked their heads. The company was joined Ljubo Milos and Ivica Matkovic. Fra Majstorovic told the mothers there will now be a baptism for their children. They took the children from the mothers, the child whom Father Majstorovic was carrying, in his child's innocence caressed the painted face of his killer. The mothers, distraught, perceived the situation. They offered their lives for mercy for the children. Two children were placed on the ground, while the third was thrown like a ball into the air, and Fr Majstorovic, holding a dagger upwards, missed three times, while the fourth time with a joke and a laugh, a child was impaled on the dagger. Mothers began throwing themselves on the ground, pulling their hair, and began to shout terribly. Ustasha guards of the 14th Osijek Company took them away and killed them. When all three children were so brutally killed, these three two-legged beasts exchanged money, because they seem to have a bet on who would the first to stick a dagger in a child."

=== Commandant of Jasenovac ===
After the war Filipović admitted that he had personally killed about 100 prisoners and had attended mass executions of many more. He estimated that under his command some 20–30,000 prisoners were murdered at the main Jasenovac camp. He said prisoners would often be made to stand in prepared trenches where each was then killed with a sledgehammer blow. He went on to describe his tenure in command of Stara Gradiška, a prison camp primarily for women which was designated Camp V within the Jasenovac system:

I [was at] Stara Gradiška from the end of October 1942 until 27 March 1943. During that time mass liquidations were performed, usually outside the camp, for instance in Mlaka and Jablanac, but some were sent off to Jasenovac too. Such large transports for liquidations were carried out by the order of Matković Ivica (i.e. Ivica Matković), and in this way 2-3,000 people were sent away. On 16 April 1945 I returned to Jasenovac, where I stayed until the end. I know that at the time corpses of prisoners from Gradina were being exhumed and burned, in order to cover up traces of what had been done. I didn't participate in the liquidation of the last prisoners, but only in exhumation.

After hearing from 62 Jasenovac survivors, whom it listed usually with complete addresses, the war-crimes commission in 1946 counted Filipović among 13 Ustaše who "stood out" for their brutality and direct involvement in the killing. It reported that even the cruelty of Ljubo Miloš, notorious for slashing prisoners to death in a mock clinic, was "surpassed in sadism" by Filipović. The commission saw Filipović's statement as a "crucial" acknowledgement of his participation in atrocities, but with respect to the numbers he had given, it noted: "All witnesses interviewed, who were prisoners themselves, speak with complete consistency and certainty of a far greater number, especially in regards to the number of victims killed by Majstorovic himself". The commission cited one witness, Tomo Krkac, who had described seeing Filipović "very often" shooting prisoners during so-called public executions and forcing prisoners to kill other prisoners with sledgehammers.

In one of the first published memoirs about life and death in the Jasenovac complex, a Croatian medical doctor and academic, Dr Nikola Nikolić, who had been imprisoned in Camp III, described his first meeting with Filipović: "His voice had an almost feminine quality which was at odds with his physical stature and coarse face". Nikolić recalled standing in the second row of a group of prisoners who had been lined up to watch as another group of prisoners were herded in front of Filipović, who summoned Nikolić to the front so that, as a doctor, he could witness "our surgery being performed without anaesthetic". Filipović then shot dead two prisoners and told a colleague to "finish off the rest".

Nikolić quotes another survivor, Josip Riboli:

Compared with Matković and Miloš, whose faces revealed the baseness of their inner natures, Filipović Majstorović seemed kind and gentle - except when the slaughtering was going on. Then he was incomparable. He was the leader of all the mass killings at Gradina. He went off to conduct the slaughtering every night and came back covered with blood.

Riboli also gave evidence to the Croatian war-crimes commission. According to the accounts of some survivors, Filipović continued to act as a chaplain while commanding the camp and sometimes wore his Franciscan robes while carrying out his crimes. As a result, he came to be known as "Fra Sotona" ("Friar Satan"). According to Ronald Rychlak, Filopovic was "tried, laicized, and expelled from the Franciscan order before the war even ended", reportedly on 22 October 1942, the date on which he was transferred to Stara Gradiška.

In September 1944, Filipović, along with Dinko Šakić and others, was appointed to sit on an ad hoc court-martial convened to try prisoners accused of forging links with the partisans and plotting an escape. The Croatian War Crimes Commission in its report was at a loss to explain why such a process had been deemed necessary when Ustaše had already killed thousands of people "by heinous means, without any justification or procedure". It reported that all 31 accused prisoners were hanged after undergoing severe torture including blindings, crushed fingers and blow-lamp burns. Filipović in his testimony said: "We [the court-martial] didn't investigate anything, we only signed the verdicts".

=== Commandant of Stara Gradiška ===
As chief of camp Stara Gradiška, which predominantly housed women and children, Miroslav Filipović-Majstorović excelled in sadism. A Jewish survivor of Jasenovac, Egon Berger, described Filipović's sadistic killing of Serbian children, while, according to two other witnesses, Simo (or Sime) Klaić and Dragutin Škrgatić: Klaić recalls that in Christmas 1942, Miroslav [Filipović-Majstorović] ordered mass and later a muster, where he killed four inmates with a knife, while forcing a Jew of Sarajevo, Alkalaj, to sing, then ordering Alkalaj to near [approach] him, stabbing him in the chest and slashing his throat. Then he killed 56 Bosnian Jews by tying them with wire, hitting them with an axe so they all fell into a well. Then he shot around 40 Bosniak villagers in the head. Škrgatić confirmed that Filipović shot the villagers in the head after mass, adding:

"In Majstorović's time, musters and executions were frequent. Friar Majstorović favored a mystical approach to the killings.... After he killed them, sat on a chair and said 'justice has been done'".

Ivan Placec, a witness, added that Filipović shot nine inmates that day for an escape attempt. Josip Erlih also viewed a similar occasion, when, he claimed, eight inmates were shot by Filipović.

== Other activities ==
As a member of the Ustasha defense, he had the rank of major. During 1943 and 1944, he acted as an intelligence officer in Herzegovina and Central Bosnia, and as an assistant commander of IV. Ustasha association in Lika. In early May 1945, he fled to Austria, where he was captured by the British and extradited to the Yugoslavia.

== Post-war ==
In 1946, Filipović stood trial in Belgrade for war crimes. He gave evidence consistent with his statement to the Croatian war-crimes commission, admitting his participation in some crimes and denying involvement in others. He was found guilty, sentenced to death and hanged. Despite his expulsion in 1942, Filipović was executed while wearing the habit of the Franciscan Order.

== In film & literature ==
- Vuk Kostić plays the role of Miroslav Filipović-Majstorović in the 2020 historical drama film Dara in Jasenovac.

== See also ==
- Involvement of Croatian Catholic clergy with the Ustaša regime

== Sources ==
- Paris, Edmond (1961). Genocide in Satellite Croatia, 1941-1945: A Record of Racial and Religious Persecutions and Massacres. Chicago: American Institute for Balkan Affairs.
- Phayer, Michael (2000). The Catholic Church and the Holocaust, 1930–1965. Bloomington and Indianapolis: Indiana University Press. ISBN 9780253337252.
- Phayer, Michael (2008). Pius XII, the Holocaust, and the Cold War. Bloomington and Indianapolis: Indiana University Press. ISBN 9780253349309.
- Novak, Viktor (2011). Magnum Crimen: Half a Century of Clericalism in Croatia. Vol. 1. Jagodina: Gambit. ISBN 9788676240494.
- Novak, Viktor (2011). Magnum Crimen: Half a Century of Clericalism in Croatia. Vol. 2. Jagodina: Gambit. ISBN 9788676240494.
