= Zavalje =

Zavalje Заваље
- Village
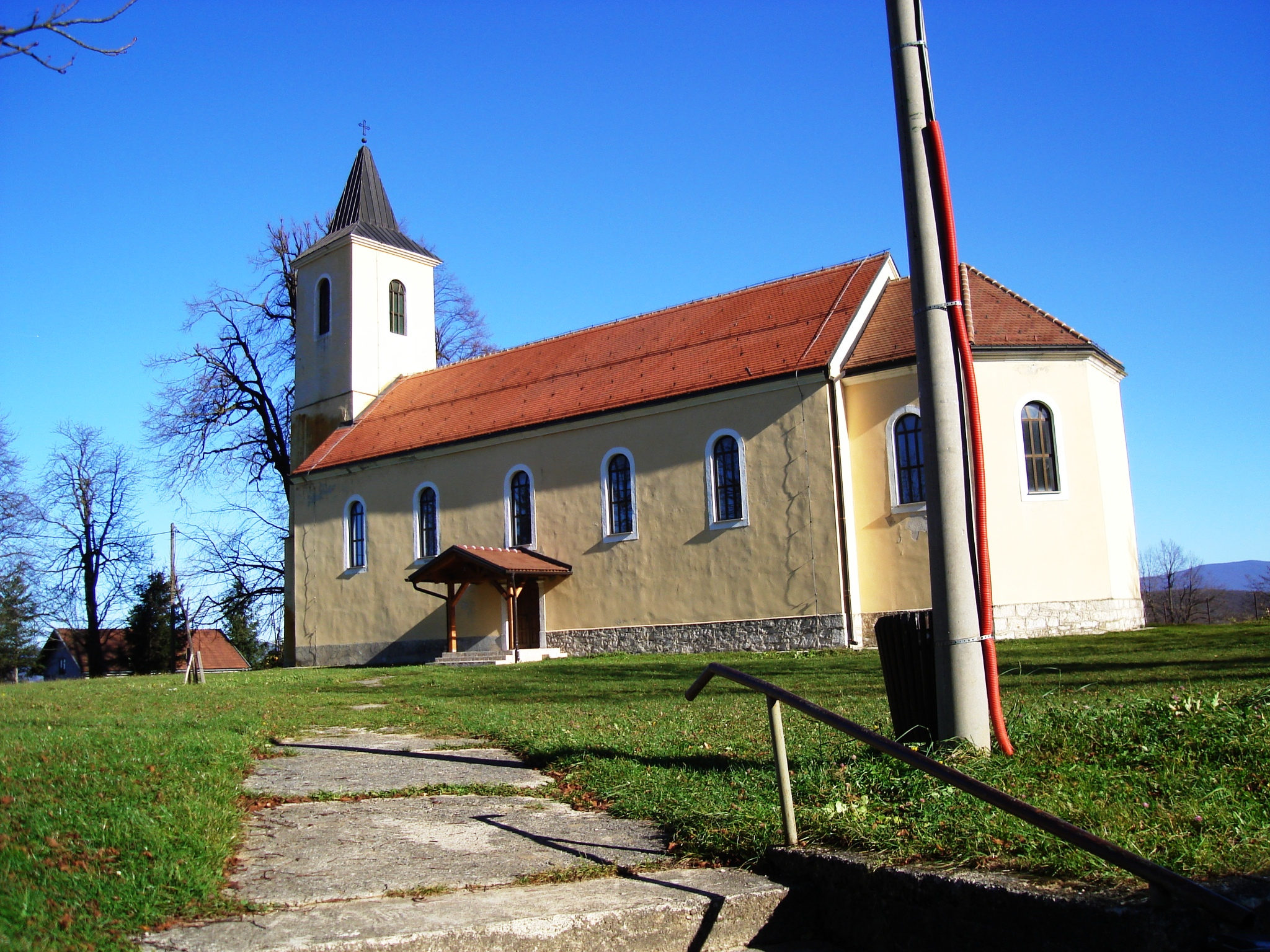
- Catholic church in Zavalje
- Interactive map of Zavalje
- Location within Bosnia and Herzegovina
- Coordinates: 44°47′N 15°51′E
- Country: Bosnia and Herzegovina
- Entity: Federation of Bosnia and Herzegovina
- Canton: Una-Sana
- Municipality: Bihać

Area
  - Total: 9.63 sq mi (24.93 km^{2})

Population (2013)
  - Total: 72
  - Density: 7.5/sq mi (2.9/km^{2})
- Time zone: UTC+1 (CET)
  - Summer (DST): UTC+2 (CEST)

Zavalje (Serbian Cyrillic: Заваље) is a village in the municipality of Bihać, Bosnia and Herzegovina.

Before World War I, Zavalje was part of the Kingdom of Croatia-Slavonia of Austria-Hungary. It became part of the Vrbas Banovina of the Kingdom of Yugoslavia in 1931, and subsequently became part of the Socialist Republic of Bosnia and Herzegovina in socialist Yugoslavia.

== Demographics ==
According to the 2013 census, its population was 72.

Ethnicity in 2013
Ethnicity	Number	Percentage
Croats	58	80.6%
Bosniaks	8	11.1%
Serbs	1	1.4%
other/undeclared	5	6.9%
Total	72	100%

== Notable people ==
- Josip Bujanović, high-ranking Ustaše official in the Independent State of Croatia during World War II
- Ivan Vidnjević, summary court judge in the Independent State of Croatia during World War II
