= Garavice =

Croatian concentration camp in WWII

- Ustaše extermination site
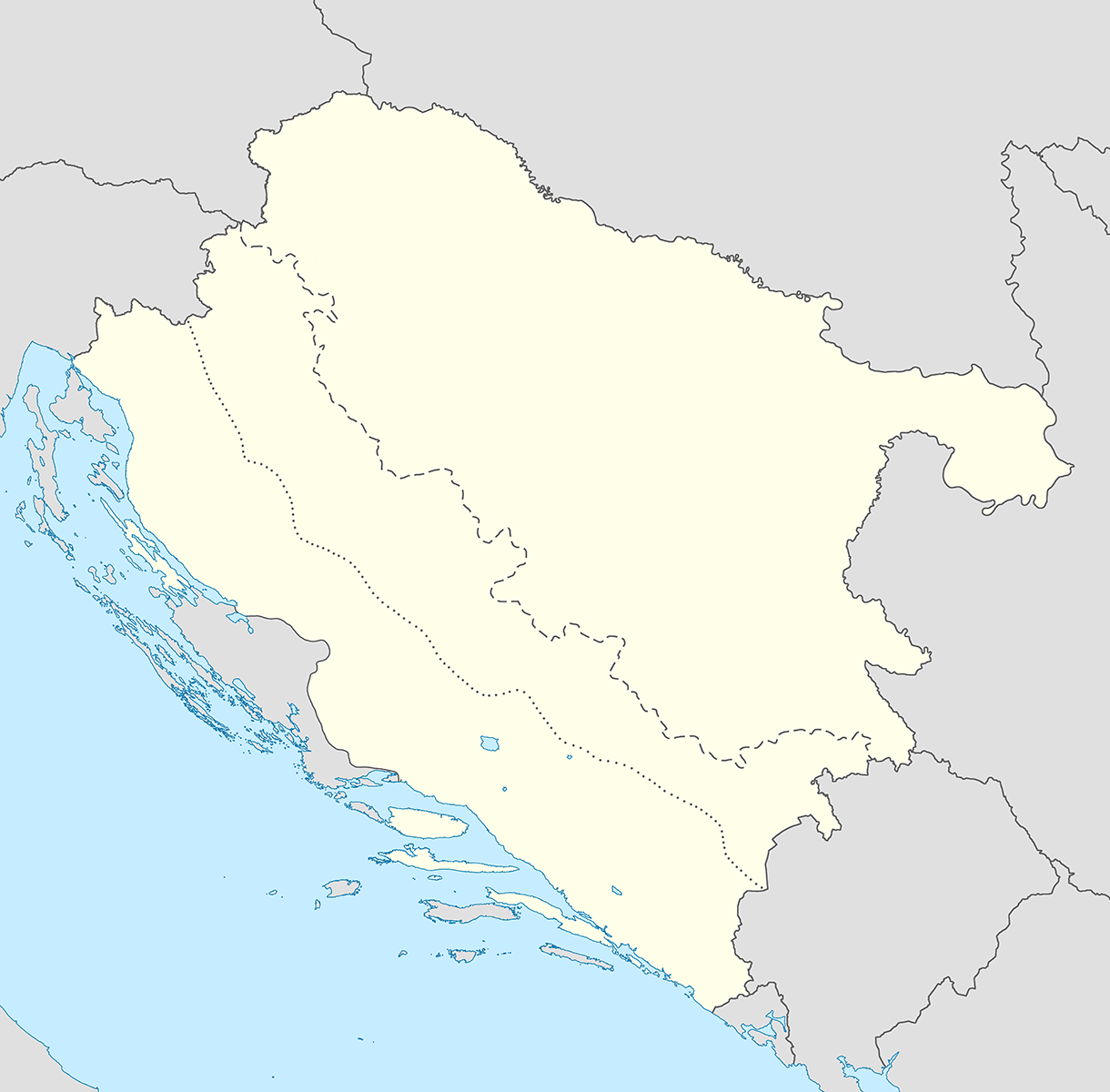
- Location of Garavice in the Independent State of Croatia
- Coordinates: 44°49′27″N 15°50′27″E
- Location: near Bihać, Independent State of Croatia
- Operated by: the Independent State of Croatia and the Ustaše movement
- Operational: July 1941 – September 1941
- Inmates: primarily Serbs, Jews and Roma
- Killed: 7,000–12,000
- Liberated by: Yugoslav Partisans

Garavice (Serbian Cyrillic: Гаравице) was an extermination site established by the Independent State of Croatia (NDH) during World War II in Yugoslavia near Bihać. Between 7,000 and 12,000 people, mostly Serbs and Jews, were murdered at Garavice by the Ustaše in 1941.

The killings in Garavice were part of a widespread genocide of Serbs, that included expulsions, forced religious conversions, and massacres of ethnic Serbs by the Ustaše regime in the Independent State of Croatia. These atrocities were carried out by Croat quisling forces and Axis occupying forces during World War II.

== Background ==
The Independent State of Croatia (NDH) was founded on 10 April 1941 by the Axis powers (after the invasion of Yugoslavia), who installed the fascist Ustaše organization as the puppet government. The Independent State of Croatia consisted of most of modern-day Croatia and all of modern-day Bosnia and Herzegovina, together with some parts of modern-day Serbia and Slovenia. NDH was the only nation beside Germany to operate extermination camps during World War II.

Some of the first decrees issued by the Poglavnik of the Independent State of Croatia, Ante Pavelić, reflected the NDH's adoption of the racist ideology of Nazi Germany towards Jews and Serbs.

== Mass murders ==
Arrests of Serb and Jewish civilians in and around Bihać were ordered by grand prefect Ljubomir Kvaternik in June 1941. The captives were transported and executed at Garavice, near Bihać. In July 1941, the Ustaše murdered 7,000–12,000 Serbs, Jews, and Roma at Garavice. The largest number of victims were Serbs. Corpses were thrown in mass graves at Garavice or tossed into the nearby Klokot and Una rivers. A large amount of blood contaminated the local water supply.

== Memorial Park ==
In 1981, the Yugoslav government established a memorial park in Garavice, designed by renowned architect Bogdan Bogdanović and opened 39 years after the massacre. In 2011, the memorial park was declared a national monument of Bosnia and Herzegovina. Since then, however, the park has reportedly been neglected by the Bosnian government, and is overgrown with weeds and bushes, and desecrated with neo-Nazi and neo-Ustaše graffiti.

== See also ==
- Genocide of Serbs in the Independent State of Croatia
