= Dobrići =

- Village
- Location within Bosnia and Herzegovina
- Coordinates: 43°39′0″N 17°6′20″E
- Country: Bosnia and Herzegovina
- Entity: Federation of Bosnia and Herzegovina
- Canton: Canton 10
- Municipality: Tomislavgrad

Area
  - Total: 27.38 km^{2} (10.57 sq mi)

Population (2013)
  - Total: 446
  - Density: 16.3/km^{2} (42.2/sq mi)
- Time zone: UTC+1 (CET)
  - Summer (DST): UTC+2 (CEST)

Dobrići is a village in the Municipality of Tomislavgrad in Canton 10 of the Federation of Bosnia and Herzegovina, an entity of Bosnia and Herzegovina.

== Demographics ==
According to the 2013 census, its population was 446.

Ethnicity in 2013
Ethnicity	Number	Percentage
Croats	445	99.8%
other/undeclared	1	0.2%
Total	446	100%

== Notable people ==
- Mirko Beljan (1899–1959), an Ustaše officer, born in Dobrići

== Bibliography ==
- Dizdar, Zdravko; Grčić, Marko; Ravlić, Slaven; Stuparić, Darko (1997). Tko je tko u NDH [Who's who in NDH] (in Croatian). Minerva. ISBN 953-6377-03-9.
- Ethnicity/National Affiliation, Religion and Mother Tongue (PDF). Sarajevo: Agency for Statistics of Bosnia and Herzegovina. 2019.
