= Husein Alić =

Husein Alić (1892 – 26 April 1962) was a Bosnian Muslim Ustaše official in the Independent State of Croatia (NDH), an Axis puppet state during World War II, who held the post of Grand Župan of Sana and Luka.

== Before World War II ==
Alić was born in Kulen Vakuf near Bihać, in Austro-Hungarian Bosnia and Herzegovina. He completed the gymnasium in Banja Luka and the University of Zagreb's Faculty of Humanities at the end of World War I in 1918. From 1929, he taught mathematics at the Technical High School and was later the principal of the Men's Gymnasium in Sarajevo.

Alić was a member of the Yugoslav Muslim Organization (Serbo-Croatian: Jugoslavenska muslimanska organizacija, JMO). At the 1920 election, he became a member of the Constitutional Assembly of the Kingdom of Serbs, Croats and Slovenes. He held a seat in the Yugoslav Assembly after every election until the country collapsed in 1941. For a short period, he was also the Assembly secretary.

When Gajret, a Bosnian Muslim cultural society, was Serbised, he worked to establish another Bosnian Muslim cultural society with pro-Croatian leanings, Narodna uzdanica (People's Hope). For years, he was on the board of Narodna uzdanica, and served as its secretary. Alić also worked as a journalist, contributing to Mehmed Spaho's Pravda and Džafer Kulenović's Narodna pravda, as well as in Obzor and other journals from Zagreb.

== Independent State of Croatia ==
After the Independent State of Croatia (NDH) had been established on 10 April 1941, Alić joined the Ustaše. He was appointed adjutant in the Ustaše headquarters in the Grand Župa of Vrhbosna in Sarajevo. In August 1941, Alić was appointed Grand Župan of Sana and Luka with a seat in Banja Luka. In the spring of 1944, during Allied bombardment, his wife and three daughters were killed. Alić asked for leave and never returned to the post of a grand župan. After the NDH collapsed in May 1945, Alić was arrested and spent a short time in the pretrial detention centre, but was never tried.
