= Petar Milutin Kvaternik =

- Born: 1 August 1882; Vučinići, near Vrbovsko, Croatia-Slavonia, Austria-Hungary
- Died: 10 April 1941 (aged 58); Crikvenica, Independent State of Croatia
- Burial place: Mirogoj cemetery, Zagreb, Croatia
- Relatives: Slavko Kvaternik (brother) Ljubomir Kvaternik (brother) Eugen Dido Kvaternik (nephew)
- Military career
- Allegiance: Austria-Hungary (1899–1918) Kingdom of Yugoslavia (1918–1919) Croatia (1941)
- Branch: Austro-Hungarian Army (1899–1918) Royal Yugoslav Army (1918–1919) Croatian Home Guard (1941)
- Service years: 1899–1919; 1941
- Rank: Major (posthumously General)
- Conflicts: World War I: Eastern Front; World War II: April War
- Other work: Politician

Petar Milutin Kvaternik (1 August 1882 – 10 April 1941) was a Croatian politician and brother of Slavko Kvaternik, Minister of the Armed Forces of the Independent State of Croatia. After he attempted to proclaim the Independent State of Croatia (NDH) in Crikvenica, he was arrested by group of Yugoslav naval officers, and killed during the scuffle between him and prison guards later same night.

== Biography ==
Kvaternik was born in Vučinić Selo near Vrbovsko. After he graduated from a gymnasium, Kvaternik joined the cadet school, and after graduation, worked as an officer of the Austro-Hungarian Army in Graz, Austria. Also, Kvaternik graduated from the Theresian Military Academy in Wiener Neustadt. During World War I, Kvaternik fought in the Battle of Galicia and Carpathian Mountains.

After the war, Kvaternik entered into service of the Army of the Kingdom of Serbs, Croats and Slovenes, but was immediately retired in 1919 as a major. During his retirement, he dedicated himself to politics and he became active in the Croatian Worker (Hrvatski radiša), an association of which he was a director in Zagreb. During the April War, the German invasion on the Kingdom of Yugoslavia, on 10 April 1941, his brother Slavko told him to go to Crikvenica to proclaim the independence and organize a takeover, as the NDH was established that day. Moreover, Kvaternik got an order from his brother to take over the North Naval Sector, which was, at the time, under the control of the Yugoslav Navy. Yugoslav commander of the sector, captain Mirko Pleiweiss, formed a detachment of sailors from Selce and arrested Kvaternik in a post in Crikvenica, along with his associates. In the night between 10 and 11 April, Kvaternik was killed during the prisoners' transfer to the municipal building, when he tried to grab lieutenant Perkačević, a commander of sailors who guarded the prisoners, but Kvaternik was shot through an eye. Đuro Hajdin (1887–1941), a local official who informed Pleiweiss about Kvaternik's actions, was also killed.

Kvaternik's body was transferred to Zagreb, where he was buried at the Mirogoj cemetery on 15 April.
