= Fermo displaced persons camp =

The Fermo Camp (Italian: Campo Fermo, Croatian: Logor Fermo) was a post-World War II displaced persons camp near Fermo, Italy whose inhabitants were Croats displaced from Yugoslavia.

The first Croats arrived in June 1945. The majority arrived at the camp on August 15, 1945. The inhabitants formed a theatre company at the camp to perform classic Croatian dramatic works. A printing press was established by Dominik Mandić which printed magazines and books at the camp.

Most of the about 2000 inhabitants who were living inside the camp, which was situated on the premises of a former textile factory, were of Ustaše background. In 1947 the camp was repeatedly raided by British military personnel in a search for war criminals hiding among the population.

In late 1947 and early 1948, representatives from Argentina, the United States, Canada, and Australia came to the camp to offer the inhabitants a chance to immigrate to their perspective countries. On one trip, the USS General W. M. Black (AP-135) transported 626 people from the camp to Peru. The camp was closed in 1948.

Upon independence, Croatia tried to entice its displaced persons to return through tax exemptions and monetary aid.
