= Petrićevac =

Coordinates: 44.7896°N 17.1852°E

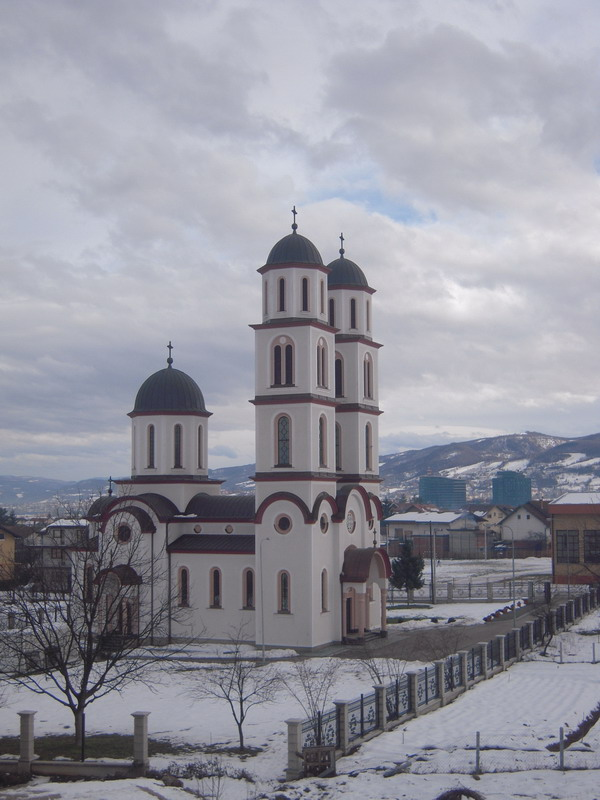
Orthodox Church in Petrićevac.

Petrićevac is a part of the city of Banja Luka in Republika Srpska, an entity of Bosnia and Herzegovina. Today there are about 10000 inhabitants in Petrićevac.

The place is the location of a Roman Catholic church of Saint Anthony and a Franciscan monastery in the 20th century. There was also a Serbian Orthodox Church built by Ilija Rankić.

== History ==
During World War II, the Orthodox church was destroyed in 1941 by the Ustaša fascist organization. Miroslav Filipović originated from the Catholic monastery before he went on to join the Ustaše during World War II, and commit numerous atrocities and war crimes over the Serbs in the region between 1942 and 1945. Filipović was defrocked after a February 1942 massacre of Serb civilians in the nearby villages (Drakulić and Motike).

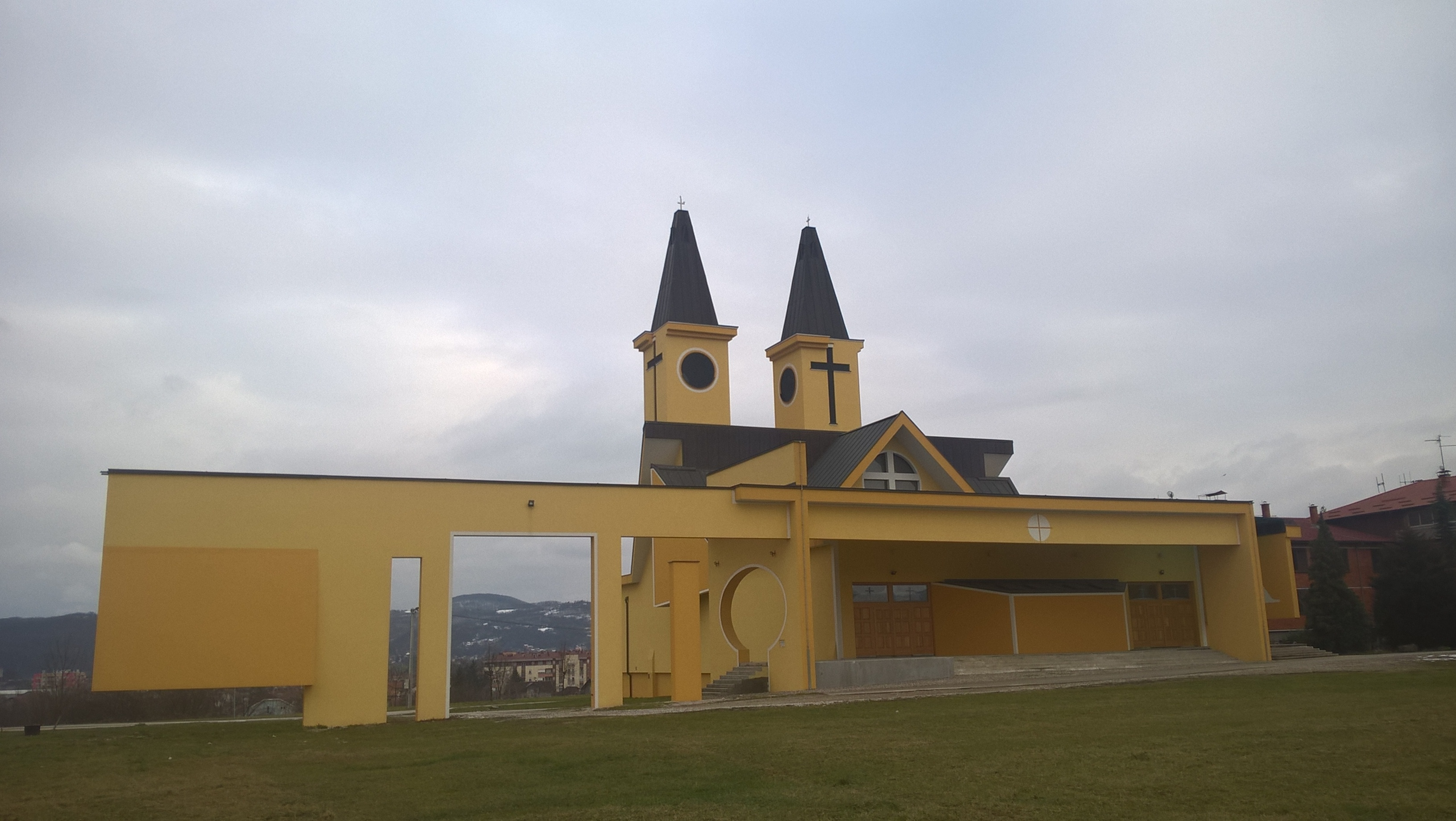
Saint Anthony Roman Catholic church in 2019

During the war in Bosnia in 1995, as the part of persecution and ethnic cleansing of the non-Serb population of the city of Banja Luka and the surrounding settlements, the Catholic Church and the monastery experienced the same fate as the 16 mosques of the city of Banja Luka which were destroyed by the Serbs already in 1993 (List of 16 destroyed mosques in Banja Luka). The Catholic Church and the monastery were destroyed in revenge by the Bosnian Serb Army, causing the death of one of the friars in the process. The reconstruction of the buildings started in 2003 after Pope John Paul II visited the site for the beatification of Ivan Merz.
