= Mirko Beljan =

Ustase officer

Commander Mirko Beljan
- Born: 12 October 1899; Dobrići, Tomislavgrad, Condominium of Bosnia and Herzegovina (Austria-Hungary)
- Died: 14 October 1959 (aged 60); Munich, West Germany
- Military career
- Allegiance: Independent State of Croatia (1941–45)
- Branch: Croatian Armed Forces
- Service years: 1941–45
- Rank: Colonel
- Conflicts: World War II

Mirko Beljan (12 October 1899 – 14 October 1959) was an Ustaše officer in the Independent State of Croatia during World War II.

He was born in the village of Dobrići, near Tomislavgrad. On 21 December 1934, he joined the Ustaše in Italy. According to a testimony by Mijo Bzik, in the 1930s Beljan was active in the Ustaše branch in Belgium.

Beljan returned to the Balkans in April 1941, following the Axis invasion of Yugoslavia and the creation of the Independent State of Croatia (NDH). In September, he was appointed commander of the Ustaše Sana–Luka headquarters in Banja Luka. During his reign, the Ustaše regularly persecuted local Serbs. They were also particularly anti-Muslim in orientation, and persecuted Bosnian Muslims as well.

Beljan later served as an officer within the personal bodyguard of Croatian leader Ante Pavelić (Croatian: Poglavnikova tjelesna bojna, PTB). In mid-1945, Beljan and other Ustaše retreated to Austria to evade capture by the Yugoslav Partisans. He was captured by Allied forces and spent time in several prisoner-of-war camps. He was released from Allied detention following the end of World War II and emigrated to Germany. There, he became the president of an organization known as the United Croats of Germany (Croatian: Ujedinjeni Hrvati u Njemačkoj). He died in Munich on 14 October 1959.

== Bibliography ==
- Dizdar, Zdravko; Grčić, Marko; Ravlić, Slaven; Stuparić, Darko (1997). Tko je tko u NDH (in Serbo-Croatian). Zagreb: Minerva. ISBN 953-6377-03-9.
- Hoare, Marko Attila (2013). Bosnian Muslims in the Second World War. Oxford: Oxford University Press. ISBN 978-0-231-70394-9.
- Krušelj, Željko (2002). "Poglavniku odan do smrti – dva neobjavljena svjedočanstva o Miji Bziku". Podravina. 1 (1): 163–180.
