= Suvaja, Bosanski Petrovac =

Suvaja Суваја
- Village
- Location within Bosnia and Herzegovina
- Coordinates: 44°35′49″N 16°18′02″E
- Country: Bosnia and Herzegovina
- Entity: Federation of Bosnia and Herzegovina
- Canton: Una-Sana
- Municipality: Bosanski Petrovac

Area
  - Total: 9.39 sq mi (24.31 km^{2})

Population (2013)
  - Total: 110
  - Density: 12/sq mi (4.5/km^{2})
- Time zone: UTC+1 (CET)
  - Summer (DST): UTC+2 (CEST)

Suvaja (Serbian Cyrillic: Суваја) is a village in the municipality of Bosanski Petrovac, Bosnia and Herzegovina.

== Demographics ==
According to the 2013 census, its population was 110.

Ethnicity in 2013
Ethnicity	Number	Percentage
Serbs	109	99.1%
Bosniaks	1	0.9%
Total	110	100%
