= Šargovac =

Šargovac Шарговац (Serbian)
- Village (Selo)
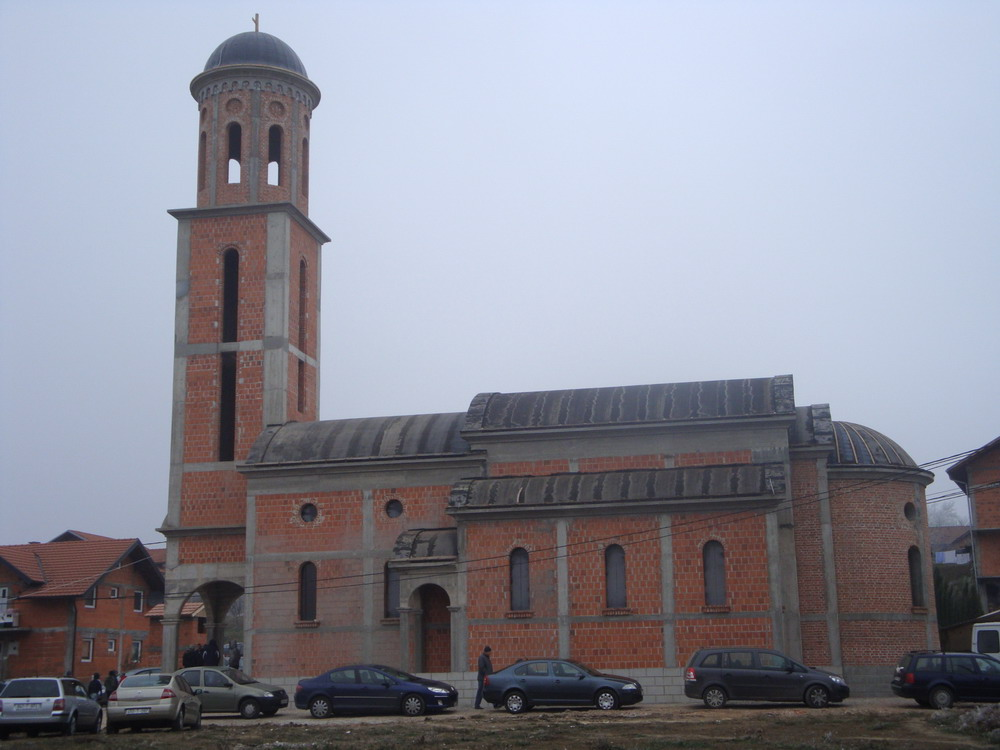
- Construction of the Orthodox Church in Šargovac
- Interactive map of Šargovac
- Location within Bosnia and Herzegovina
- Country: Bosnia and Herzegovina
- Entity: Republika Srpska
- Municipality: Banja Luka

Population (2013)
  - Total: 3,171
- Time zone: UTC+1 (CET)
  - Summer (DST): UTC+2 (CEST)

Šargovac (Serbian Cyrillic: Шарговац) is a village in the municipality of Banja Luka (present-day Republika Srpska, Bosnia and Herzegovina).

During World War II, on 7 February 1942, Ustaše paramilitaries, led by a Franciscan friar, Miroslav Filipović (aka Tomislav Filipović-Majstorović), killed more than 2,300 Serbs (among them 500 children) in Drakulić, Motike, and Šargovac.
