= Slavko Kvaternik =

Croatian soldier and politician (1878–1947)

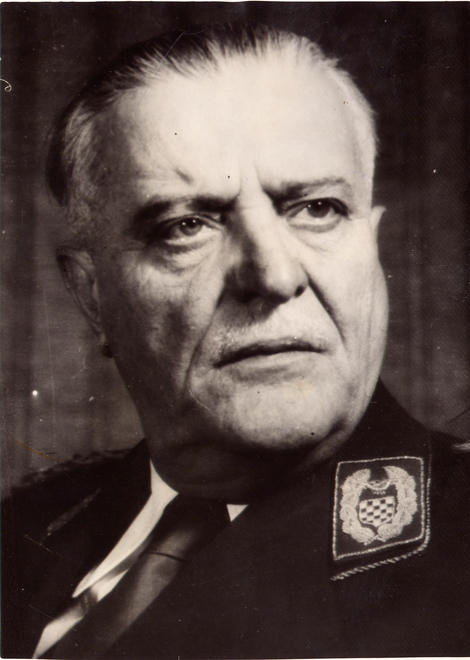
- Kvaternik in 1942

1st Minister of Armed Forces of the Independent State of Croatia
- In office 10 April 1941 – 4 January 1943
- Prime Minister: Ante Pavelić
- Preceded by: Office established
- Succeeded by: Ante Pavelić

Chief of General Staff of the State of Slovenes, Croats and Serbs
- In office 29 October 1918 – 1 December 1918
- President: Anton Korošec
- Preceded by: Office established
- Succeeded by: Office abolished

Personal details
- Born: 25 August 1878 Moravice, Croatia-Slavonia, Austria-Hungary
- Died: 13 June 1947 (aged 68) Zagreb, PR Croatia, FPR Yugoslavia
- Cause of death: Execution by hanging
- Party: Ustaše
- Spouse: Olga Frank
- Children: Eugen Dido Kvaternik
- Relatives: Petar Milutin Kvaternik (brother); Ljubomir Kvaternik (brother)
- Profession: Military officer
- Awards: Iron Cross 1st Class; Iron Trefoil 1st Class

Military service
- Allegiance: Austria-Hungary (1896–1918); Kingdom of Yugoslavia (1918–1921); Independent State of Croatia (1941–1943)
- Branch/service: Austro-Hungarian Army (1896–1918); Yugoslav Royal Army (1918–1921); Domobranstvo (1941–1943)
- Years of service: 1896–1921; 1941–1943
- Rank: Vojskovođa (field marshal)
- Commands: Domobranstvo
- Battles/wars: World War I; Eastern Front; Italian campaign; World War II

Slavko Kvaternik (25 August 1878 – 7 June 1947) was a Croatian military general and politician who was one of the founders of the ultranationalist Ustaše movement. Kvaternik was military commander and Minister of the Armed Forces (Domobranstvo) of the Independent State of Croatia. In 1941, he declared the creation of the Independent State of Croatia and became Ante Pavelić's right-hand man, the Doglavnik.

Kvaternik was an officer in the Austro-Hungarian Army and was involved in World War I. After the collapse of Austria-Hungary, he was appointed by the National Council of the State of Slovenes, Croats and Serbs to lead a successful incursion into Međimurje in late 1918. He later transferred to the Royal Yugoslav Army and remained there until 1921.

In 1929, he was one of the founders of the Ustasha – Croatian Revolutionary Movement in Italy. After Germany invaded Yugoslavia in April 1941, he declared the creation of the Independent State of Croatia on 10 April 1941 with the support of the Axis. In the newly created state, he became the Minister of the Armed Forces until 1943, when he retired. Kvaternik was executed for war crimes in 1947.

== Early life ==
Slavko Kvaternik was born in Moravice (then known as Komorske Moravice) in the Kingdom of Croatia-Slavonia of Austria-Hungary on 25 August 1878, the son of Ljudevit, a postman, and his wife, Marija (née Frank), who was of German descent from Bavaria and Catholic by religion.

Slavko Kvaternik married Olga Frank, daughter of Josip Frank, a Croatian nationalist politician of Jewish descent, who converted from Judaism to Roman Catholicism. Their son, Dido, was a member of the Ustasha. At the end of August 1941, Olga Frank committed suicide, probably because of her Jewish origins and the roles of her husband, and (especially) of her son Dido, in the NDH.

Educated in a military academy, Kvaternik served in the Austro-Hungarian Army during World War I, and was awarded the German Iron Cross 1st Class (1918). In 1918, he joined the newly formed National Council of Slovenes, Croats and Serbs, becoming the Chief of General Staff. At the end of the year, Kvaternik commanded Croatian troops during the successful 1918 occupation of Međimurje.

== World War II ==
After the German invasion of the Kingdom of Yugoslavia on 6 April 1941, the Ustaše formed their government with Ante Pavelić as leader. Four days later Kvaternik proclaimed the establishment of the Independent State of Croatia (NDH) and formed the first Ustasha government. At the same time, at Kvaternik's request, Vladko Maček (the leader of the Croatian Peasant Party, who had refused to cooperate with the Germans when they requested he lead the new nation) told the people to cooperate with the new regime.

Original audio recording of Slavko Kvaternik proclaiming the establishment of the NDH

Kvaternik's position at this time was commander-in-chief of the Croatian Armed Forces. This carried the title of vojskovođa (marshal). He was also the second-most powerful man in the state, even though he was only one of the members of the "Doglavnik's Council" (Croatian: Doglavničko vijeće). The Croatian Home Guard was established on 11 April. He stayed in his position until his retirement on 4 January 1943. In May 1942 Kvaternik ordered the deportation of Serbs from 12 villages in Petrinja County and 6 villages in Glina County to Jasenovac and Stara Gradiška concentration camps. From Petrinja County villages 1200-1250 people were deported to concentration camps, while from Glina County at least 471 of those deported died in Ustaše concentration camps.

He was awarded the 1st Class Cross of the Military Order of the Iron Trefoil during his service to the NDH. This award gave him the title of vitez (knight), which is sometimes included in his name.

== Death ==
After the Second World War's end, Kvaternik was captured by the United States Army and extradited to Yugoslavia. In Yugoslavia, he was tried and sentenced to death for his crimes under the NDH regime. He was executed by hanging in Zagreb on 7 June 1947.

== Honours ==
=== National honours ===
- Croatia: Military Order of the Iron Trefoil, 1st class

=== Foreign honours ===
- German Empire: Iron Cross, 1st class
- Kingdom of Italy: Order of Saints Maurice and Lazarus, Knight Grand Cross
- Kingdom of Hungary: Order of Merit of the Kingdom of Hungary, Grand Cross
- Nazi Germany: Order of the German Eagle, Grand Cross

== Sources ==
- Radanović, Milan (2023). "Interniranje srpskog stanovništva s područja kotara Petrinja u logore Jasenovac i Stara Gradiška svibnja 1942" [Internment of Serb Population from Petrinja County to Jasenovac and Stara Gradiška camps in May 1942]. Tragovi: časopis za srpske i hrvatske teme (in Serbo-Croatian). 6. Archive of Serbs in Croatia: 120–178. doi:10.52328/t.6.1.4.
