= Dido Kvaternik =

Croatian fascist (1910–1962)

Eugen Kvaternik
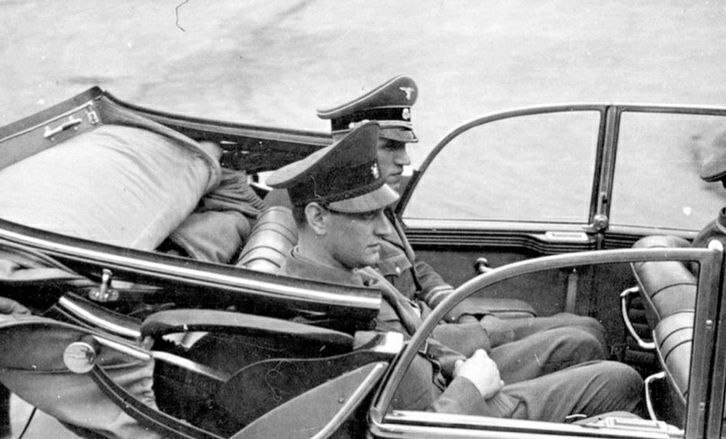
- Dido Kvaternik and Obersturmführer of the SD chatting in a car
- Born: 29 March 1910; Zagreb, Croatia-Slavonia, Austria-Hungary
- Died: 10 March 1962 (aged 51); Río Cuarto, Córdoba, Argentina
- Parent(s): Slavko Kvaternik; Olga Frank
- Relatives: Petar Milutin Kvaternik (uncle); Ljubomir Kvaternik (uncle)
- Military career
- Branch: Army
- Service years: 1941–1943
- Rank: Colonel
- Nickname: Dido
- Unit: Ustaše Militia (1941–1943)
- Commands: Ustaše Surveillance Service
- Conflicts: World War II

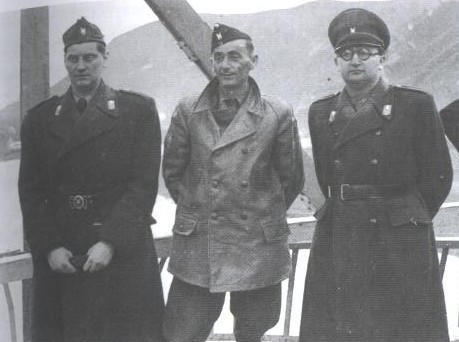
Kvaternik with Jure Francetić and Foreign Minister Mladen Lorković (from left to right) on a bridge on the Drina, the former border to Serbia (Zvornik, April/May 1942)

Eugen Dido Kvaternik (29 March 1910 – 10 March 1962) was a Croatian Ustaše General-Lieutenant and the Chief of the Internal Security Service in the Independent State of Croatia, during World War II.

== Life ==
Eugen Dido Kvaternik was the son of Slavko Kvaternik, a general in the Independent State of Croatia army and a member of the Ustaše, and Olga Frank, daughter of Josip Frank, a Catholic convert whose parents were Jewish. Kvaternik was sentenced to death in absentia by France for organizing the assassination of King Alexander I of Yugoslavia. However, at the time, he was imprisoned by authorities in Fascist Italy, who refused to hand him over for execution. He was released in 1936, having served two years, whereupon he joined the exiled Ustasha members on the island of Lipari.

He instituted a regime of terror against Serbs, Jews, Gypsies and other "enemies of the State". In 1943, after a falling-out with Pavelić, the leader of the Independent State of Croatia, he and his father, Slavko, the Croatian Minister of War, went into exile in Slovakia, and after the war fled to Argentina. From Argentina, he directed activities against Josip Broz Tito. He reorganized Ustaše supporters and continued to publish actively. Yugoslavia's multiple extradition requests were all turned down, and Kvaternik was never tried. Dido Kvaternik died in a car crash in Río Cuarto, Argentina in 1962.

== Family ==
Kvaternik met Marija Cvitković in 1941; the two married on 10 January 1942. The couple had three children: Slavko, Davor and Olga. Slavko later became a professor of political sciences in Argentina, and Davor became a cardiologist in Boston, Massachusetts. Dido and Olga both died in a car accident on 10 March 1962.

== Bibliography ==
- Goldstein, Ivo (2001). Holokaust u Zagrebu. Zagreb: Novi Liber. ISBN 953-6045-19-2.
