= Motike, Banja Luka =

Motike Мотике (Serbian)
- Village (Selo)
- Interactive map of Motike
- Location within Bosnia and Herzegovina
- Coordinates: 44°49′20″N 17°08′17″E
- Country: Bosnia and Herzegovina
- Entity: Republika Srpska
- Municipality: Banja Luka

Population (2013)
  - Total: 2,622
- Time zone: UTC+1 (CET)
  - Summer (DST): UTC+2 (CEST)

Motike (Serbian Cyrillic: Мотике) is a village in the municipality of Banja Luka, Republika Srpska, Bosnia and Herzegovina.
