= Orders, decorations, and medals of the Independent State of Croatia =

During World War II the Independent State of Croatia awarded a number of orders, decorations and medals.

== History ==
After the early April 1941 invasion of Yugoslavia, the Kingdom of Yugoslavia was crushed, and the so-called Independent State of Croatia was established with Ante Pavelić as the Head of State. As the Ustasha government of Yugoslavia were allies of the German Nazi government, the orders and decorations of Croatia from World War II remained secret until 1990 when Croatia became independent.

== List of Medals ==
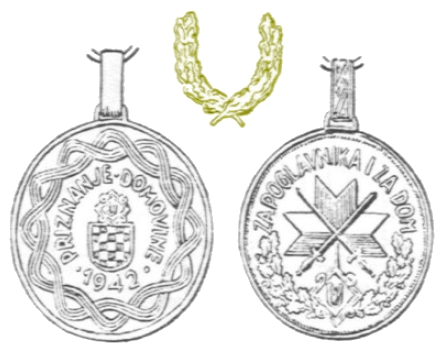
Wound Medal

- Military Order of the Iron Trefoil (Vojnički red željeznog trolista) (27 December 1941)
- Order of the Crown of King Zvonimir (Red krune kralja Zvonimira) (17 May 1941)
- Medal of the Crown of King Zvonimir (Kolajna krune kralja Zvonimira) (27 December 1941)
- Medal of Poglavnik Ante Pavelić for Bravery (Kolajna poglavnika Ante Pavelića za hrabrost) (27 December 1941)
- Foundation of the Independent State of Croatia Memorial Ribbon (Spomenznak na uspostavu Nezavisne Države Hrvatske) (18 March 1942)
- Order of Merit (Red za zasluge) (19 December 1942)
- Wound Medal (Ranjenička kolajna) (8 April 1943)
- 5th December 1918 Commemorative Ribbon (Spomenznak 5. prosinca 1918.) (30 November 1943)
- War Memorial Ribbon (Ratni spomenznak) (29 December 1943)
- Ustaše Badge of Honor (Ustaški častni znak) (3 April 1944)

On 10 April 1945 the Velebit medal (Velebitska kolajna) for bravery (silver and bronze) was added to the order of Croatian decorations. It was created on 1 January 1932 in Italy, and awarded to soldiers who participated in a diversion in Lika village Buršani (7 September 1932).

By declaration of the Croatian government on 10 October 1943, small signs (ribbons) were added as decorations. Ribbons were made for military personnel and worn on uniforms.

Since 1942, decorations of Croatia have been made in the Zagreb mint, "Braća Knaus" (Brothers Knaus) (former "Griesbach & Knaus"), and in the workshop of Teodor Krivak in Varaždin (former "Sorlini").

The Order of the Crown of King Zvonimir was made from the design of air force colonel Jakob Machiedo. Colonel Machiedo's design incorporated art elements from the oldest Croatian culture heritage, the trefoil ornament.

The Medal of the Crown of King Zvonimir and the Medal of Poglavnik Ante Pavelić for bravery were made by the Croatian sculptor Ivo Kerdić. The Order of the Crown of King Zvonimir and The Military Order of Iron Trefoil have the shape of the Trefoil Cross. The Trefoil Cross has become famous and is known in world literature as the "Croatian Cross".

== Knighthood ==
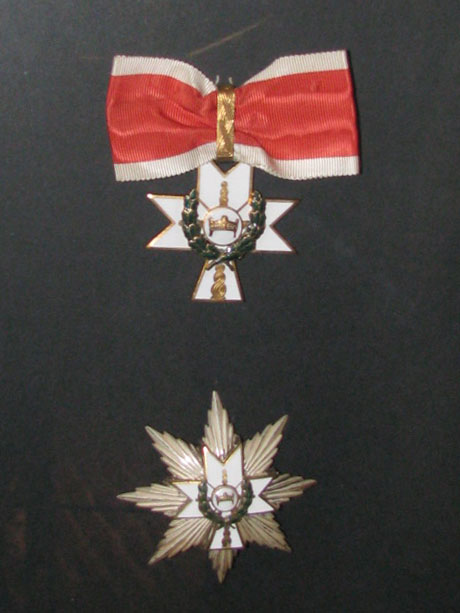
Order of the Crown of King Zvonimir with Star and Oak Wreath

Knighthood in the Independent State of Croatia was conferred by the state during its existence from 1941 to 1945. The title of vitez, or knight, was awarded to recipients of certain state orders and awards.

The following awards granted the title:

1. Military Order of the Iron Trefoil 1st Class with oak leaves
2. Military Order of the Iron Trefoil 1st Class
3. Grand Order of the Crown of King Zvonimir with star and oak leaves
4. Grand Order of the Crown of King Zvonimir with star and swords
5. Grand Order of the Crown of King Zvonimir
6. Ante Pavelić Medal for Bravery in gold
7. Military Order of the Iron Trefoil 2nd Class with oak leaves
8. Military Order of the Iron Trefoil 2nd Class
9. Order of the Crown of King Zvonimir 1st Class with star and oak leaves
10. Order of the Crown of King Zvonimir with star and swords
11. Order of the Crown of King Zvonimir with star

=== Knights ===
The title was awarded to 26 generals:

- Ladislav Aleman (-1945)
- Salko Alikadić (-1941)
  - Received award posthumously after death in Operation Ozren.
- Vilko Begić (1874–1946)
- Rafael Boban (1907–?)
- Eduard Bona Bunić (1894–1944)
  - Received award posthumously after death in Battle of Travnik.
- Matija Čanić (1901–1964)
- Milan Desović (1895–1960)
- Fedor Dragojlov
- Stjepan Duić (-1934)
  - Received award posthumously after establishment of the Independent State of Croatia.
- Jure Francetić (1912–1942)
  - Received award posthumously after his death in 1942.
- Đuro Grujić (1885–1945)
- Artur Gustović (-1945)
- Đuro Jakčin (-1944)
- Slavko Kvaternik (1878–1947)
- Vladimir Laxa (1869–1945)
- Vjekoslav Luburić (1914–1969)
- Franjo Lukac (-1946)
- Josip Metzger (1883–1945)
- Ante Moškov (1911–1948)
- Ivan Perčević (1881–1947)
- Krunoslav Stjepan Perčić (1891–1971)
- Dragutin Rubčić (-1986)
- Adolf Sabljak (1886–1947)
- Tomislav Sertić (1898–1945)
- Franjo Šimić (1900–1944)
- Slavko Stanzer (1872–1945)

Colonels to receive the title included:

- Viktor Pavičić (-1943)
