= Josip Metzger =

Ustaše general

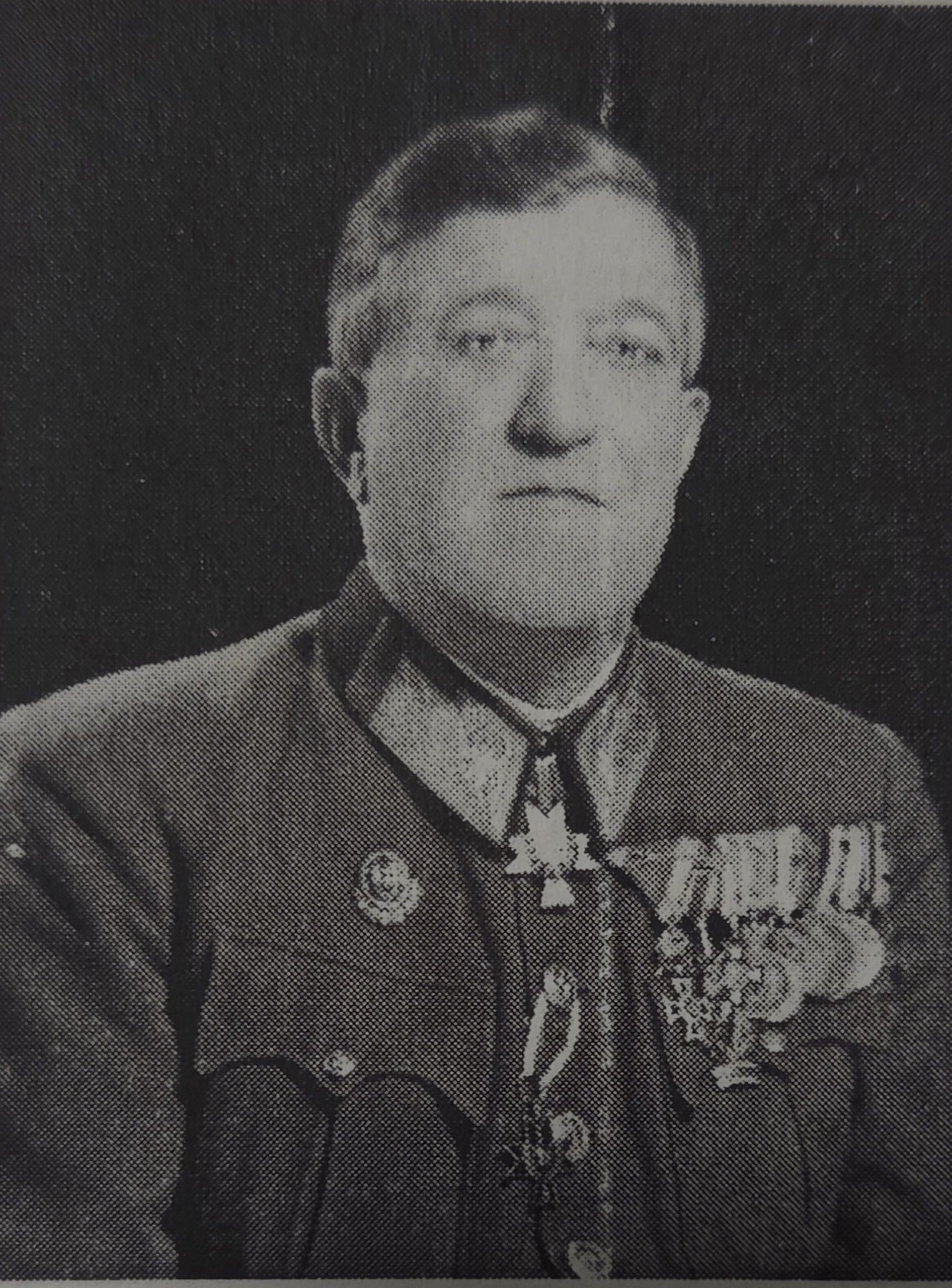
- Born: 17 August 1883; Franzfeld, Kingdom of Hungary, Austria-Hungary
- Died: 21 June 1945 (aged 61); Zagreb, FS Croatia, DF Yugoslavia
- Military career
- Allegiance: Austria-Hungary; Independent State of Croatia
- Branch: Austro-Hungarian Army (until 1918); Domobranstvo (1941–1944); Croatian Armed Forces (1944–1945)
- Rank: Major-General
- Awards: Order of the Crown of King Zvonimir

Josip Metzger (17 August 1883 – 21 June 1945) was a member of the fascist Ustaše movement who rose to the rank of major general in the Independent State of Croatia during World War II. He was tried, sentenced and executed for war crimes after the war.

== Early life ==
A Danube Swabian who was born in Franzfeld in the Austro-Hungarian Empire (now Kačarevo in Serbia), Metzger graduated from the Austro-Hungarian Military Academy in Trieste.

== World War I ==
During World War I, Metzger served as an Officer in the Austro-Hungarian Army, reaching the rank of infantry Captain.

== Interwar separatism ==
After the defeat of the Austro-Hungarian empire, the State of Slovenes, Croats and Serbs declared independence on 1 October 1918, however on 1 December 1918, Regent Alexander announced the union of the Kingdom of Serbia with the State of Slovenes, Croats and Serbs to form the Kingdom of Serbs, Croats and Slovenes.

On 5 December 1918, Metzger led a minor revolt of Croat soldiers in Zagreb, contemporaneously with other regional uprisings, and continued to lead action into 1919 as commander of the Hungarian-based Croatian Legion, the small paramilitary wing of the Croatian Committee.

Metzger was arrested several times, including for his participation in the so-called Diamantstein affair (Croatian: Afera Diamantstein) of 1919. Acquitted on 7 April 1920, he fled to the Hungarian border village of Vízvár, and distributed political leaflets in the neighbouring Yugoslav Medjimurje region.

Metzger worked for the Hungarian Defense Ministry. During 1930, Metzger, then a Hungarian intelligence officer, engaged with other members of the Party of Rights in organisation of proto-Ustaše activity among Croats in towns along the border of the Kingdom of Yugoslavia.

Metzger's German descent was a rarity among the small number of pre-World War II Ustaše members, given the Ustaše's racialist principals. He was allegedly one of the organisers of the 1934 assassination in Marseille of King Alexander I of Yugoslavia.

== World War II ==
On 10 April 1941, after the invasion of Yugoslavia by the Axis powers, the puppet government of Independent State of Croatia was created, headed by Ustaše leader Ante Pavelić.

In response to the June 1941 uprising in eastern Herzegovina by Serb rebels, General Vladimir Laxa intended for Metzger (by-then promoted to Lieutenant-Colonel) to command a newly formed special unit to clear the Montenegrin hinterland of any remaining rebels once its border areas had been cleared.

In the summer of 1944, the People's Uprising Corps (Croatian: Pučko Ustaški Sbor, lit. 'Ustaše Reserve Corps') was formed with four regiments of older reservists under Metzger, by then a Major-General. The Corps, named after the original corps which fought alongside the Royal Croatian Home Guard (Croatian: Hrvatsko Domobranstvo) against Serbia in 1914, was disbanded in March 1945. Metzger then led the 4th Division in the Battle of Lijevče Field between March 30 and April 8, 1945.

For his service to the Independent State of Croatia during World War II, Metzger was awarded the Order of the Crown of King Zvonimir 1st Class Cross with Star, which granted him Knighthood and allowed him the title vitez.

== Death ==
Metzger surrendered on 15 May 1945 to the British and was repatriated to Yugoslavia. Having been convicted as one of the chief organisers of the Janka-Puszta training camp in Hungary, he was executed in Zagreb on 21 June 1945.
