= Matija Čanić =

Croatian military officer

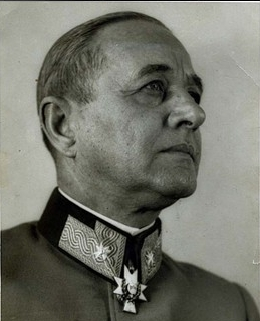
- Born: 1901; Gospić, Austria-Hungary
- Died: 3 May 1964 (aged 62/63); Buenos Aires, Argentina
- Military career
- Allegiance: Austria-Hungary; Kingdom of Yugoslavia; Independent State of Croatia
- Branch: Austro-Hungarian Army (1918); Royal Yugoslav Army (1918–1941); Domobranstvo (1941–1945)
- Service years: 1918–1945
- Rank: General
- Commands: 2nd Infantry Division; Devil Division; 1st Infantry Division; II Military District; Land Forces of the Croatian Armed Forces
- Conflicts: World War I; World War II

Matija Čanić (1901 – 3 May 1964) was a Croatian military officer who became a general during the Independent State of Croatia and was awarded the title of knight (vitez). He was a supporter of Lorković-Vokić coup, but suffered no serious consequences.

== Biography ==
Čanić was born in Gospić in 1901. He served in the Austro-Hungarian Army for a short time, took part in the 1918 occupation of Međimurje, and then joined the Royal Yugoslav Army where he served from December 1918 until April 1941.

After that he joined the Croatian Domobranstvo with the rank of colonel, where he served in the cavalry. At the beginning of his career in the Croatian Army, he was commander of the Military Command in Sarajevo, and after he became commander of 2nd Infantry Division. He was division commander from September 1942 until December 1942. After that, he commanded the Devil Division from December 1942 until January 1943. He became commander of 1st Infantry Division in January 1943 and held that position until the February. After that he took command of the Mountain Corps and served as its commander from February until November 1943.

In August 1943 he was promoted to General. From November 1943 until February 1944 he was commander of II Military District with its HQ in Brod. In February 1944 he was commander of Land Forces of Croatian Armed Forces, and shortly after the arrest of Ante Vokić in August, he was resolved from all duties and he was then in the service of the Ministry of Armed Forces (Croatian: Ministarstvo oružanih snaga, MINORS). In April 1944 he visited the German High Command of Wilhelm Keitel together with Ante Vokić.

After the capitulation of the Independent State of Croatia he retreated to Austria, then to Italy. For a short time he remained in Rome where he ran a public kitchen that fed thousands of Croatian refugees. Afterwards, he was arrested by Allied Forces, but he escaped extradition to Communist Yugoslavia and went to Buenos Aires in Argentina, where he died on 3 May 1964.
