= Tomislav Sertić =

Croatian Ustaše officer

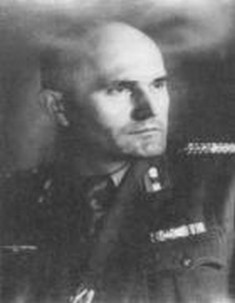
- Born: 21 December 1902; Udbina, Austria-Hungary
- Died: September 1945 (aged 42); Belgrade, Democratic Federal Yugoslavia
- Alma mater: Military Academy in Belgrade
- Military career
- Allegiance: Yugoslavia (1923–1940); Independent State of Croatia (1941–1945)
- Service years: 1923–1940; 1941–1945
- Rank: General
- Conflicts: World War II (executed)
- Awards: Military Order of the Iron Trefoil; Order of the Crown of King Zvonimir; Wound Medal

Tomislav Sertić (21 December 1902 – September 1945) was a Croatian military officer who served as the commander of all Ustaše military units, chief of staff of the Ustaše Militia and the Chief of the General Staff of the Croatian Armed Forces in the Axis puppet state known as the Independent State of Croatia (NDH). He was captured at the end of World War II and executed as a war criminal.

Born in Udbina, Sertić graduated from the Military Academy in Belgrade and later served in the Royal Yugoslav Army, where he reached the rank of major. During this time, he secretly made contact with the Ustaše, and fled to Italy to join them in 1940. Sertić returned to Croatia when the NDH was established in April 1941. He was first appointed as the commander of all Ustaše military units and as the commander of the 1st Ustaše Regiment, better known as the Black Legion, but was dismissed from this position following quarrels with other high-ranking Ustaše officials. He later served as the chief of staff of the Ustaše Militia, and afterwards, as a supervisor of all the NDH's military schools. While in this position, he was seriously wounded during the Partisan siege of Gospić. In 1944, he was promoted to the rank of general in the Croatian Home Guard, and later that year, was appointed as the Chief of the General Staff of the Armed Forces.

As the NDH collapsed in April 1945, Sertić retreated from Zagreb towards Austria, where he was captured by the British. He was subsequently extradited to Yugoslavia and tried for war crimes in Belgrade, where he was found guilty on 22 September 1945 and promptly sentenced to death. The date of his execution is unknown.

== Early life and education ==
Tomislav Sertić was born in Udbina on 21 December 1902. He completed high school in Zagreb and a trade school in Dubrovnik. Sertić then finished military school in Maribor and Military Academy in Belgrade in 1923. After finishing his education, Sertić became a lieutenant in Royal Yugoslav Army, he was promoted to the rank of major on 6 September 1939. While in the Yugoslav Army, Sertić maintained a secret connection with Ustaše (Croatian fascist organization) groups in Italy and Hungary which helped him flee Yugoslavia in 1940. Sertić also delivered Yugoslav military intelligence to Ustaše officer Adolf Sabljak who was tasked with handling Ustaše military espionage.

== Ustaše officer ==
On 27 August 1940, Tomislav Sertić fled to Hungary and later moved to Italy where he met with several Ustaše leaders, including Ante Pavelić, Dido Kvaternik and Mijo Bzik. He entered Ustaše service on 2 September 1940. Sertić was part of Ante Pavelić's escort when Pavelić traveled to Rome to meet with Italian officials, Sertić took part in several of these meetings where military issues were discussed.

Sertić traveled back to Croatia when Independent State of Croatia (NDH) was established during the April war. Sertić was appointed by Ante Pavelić for Commander of all Ustaše Military Units (Note: Croatian: Zapovjednik svih Ustaških Vojnih Jedinica) on 3 May 1941. At the same time, he was appointed as the commander of the 1st Ustaše Regiment. After two weeks he was dismissed from this position following quarrels with Slavko Kvaternik and other high-ranking Ustaše officials. His conflict with so-called Rasovi (Note: Rasovi was the name for high ranking Ustaše officials who had large autonomy in decision-making and a significant influence on Ante Pavelić.) continued through the whole war.

Sertić was appointed as a commander of the newly established Officer School of Ustaše Militia on 26 May 1941. While in this position, Sertić also commanded several Ustaše units which carried out operations against the Partisans and Chetniks in Western Bosnia. Sertić's criminal charge states that he also participated in Ustaše operations in Lika where he equipped and morally prepared 1st Lika Battalion which was responsible for egregious crimes in battles against Partisans. It also states that Sertić formed the infamous Black Legion. He remained commander of the Officer School until 5 November 1941 when he was appointed for Chief of Staff of the Ustaše Militia, (Note: Croatian: Glavar Glavnog stožera Ustaške Vojnice) a position that he remained on until late August 1942.

Between late August 1942 and 1 November 1942, Sertić served as Commander of Ustaše schools of Ustaše Militia. (Note: Croatian: Zapovjednik Ustaskih učilišta Ustaške vojnice) On 15 January 1943, he was appointed for Supervisor of all military schools of the Independent State of Croatia. He kept going to the battlefield and commanding units while in this position. On 1 May 1943, Sertić was heavily injured during the Partisan siege of Gospić by what he claimed to be a bullet fired by Ustaše units. He was immediately flown to Zagreb where he spent a month in a hospital, recovering from this injury. For his actions during siege of Gospić he was awarded with Military Order of the Iron Trefoil of 3rd Class and Wound Medal.

After recovering from the injury, Sertić continued to serve as supervisor of all military schools until September 1943 when he was again appointed for chief of staff of the Ustaše militia. For his accomplishments in this position Sertić was promoted to a rank of general in the Croatian Home Guard on 14 July 1944. Ministry of the Armed Forces of NDH was reorganized on 22 December 1944, it was split into the two departments; the administrative staff and the general staff of the Armed Forces. Sertić was appointed Chief of the General Staff and he remained in that position until the end of the war.

On 7 May 1945, Sertić together with several other Ustaše officers led by Ante Pavelić began retreating towards Austria. Sertić reached Krumpendorf before being captured by the British forces. On 18 May, he was handed over to the Partisans, who transferred him to Zagreb on 28 or 29 May where he was imprisoned and questioned.

== Trial and death ==
Between 7 and 9 June 1945, Sertić was transferred from Zagreb to a prison in Belgrade. He was tried for war crimes alongside 34 other NDH officers. During his trial, Archbishop of Zagreb Aloysius Stepinac spoke in his defense, saying that he "personally knew Sertić as a noble person, full of humanness, who always condemned injustice". On 22 September 1945, Sertić was found guilty and sentenced to death. The date of his execution is unknown. However, his friend and distant relative Zdenka Sertić, who visited him during his imprisonment, remarked in her diary that he was handed over to the OZNA on 27 September. She added that he was said to have been executed the same day, either in Banjica or at Jajinci. The Croatian-language biographical reference publication Tko je tko u NDH ("Who's Who in the NDH") suggests that Sertić was executed at some point in September 1945.
