= Abdulah Čamo =

Abdulah Čamo (1916 – 3 May 1943) was a Bosnian Muslim mufti who served as the Croatian Home Guard mufti during World War II.

Čamo was born in Bileća in Austro-Hungarian Bosnia and Herzegovina. He completed the Sharia gymnasium in Sarajevo in 1937. After completing his education, he returned to Bileća, where he worked on establishing the Ustaše. After the collapse of the Kingdom of Yugoslavia and the establishment of the Independent State of Croatia (NDH), he was appointed the commander of the Ustaše in Bileća. Soon, he went to Zagreb where in December 1941 he was appointed the mufti of the Croatian Home Guard. He died in Sarajevo after a serious illness.
