= Croatian Armed Forces (disambiguation) =

Croatian Armed Forces may refer to:

- Armed Forces of Croatia, the Croatian military
- Croatian Armed Forces (Independent State of Croatia), the military of the World War II Axis puppet state
