= Ivan Tomašević (soldier) =

Croatian military commander (1892–1945)

- Born: 3 September 1892; Zagreb, Croatia-Slavonia, Austria-Hungary
- Died: 13 September 1945 (aged 53); Belgrade, Serbia, SFR Yugoslavia
- Military career
- Allegiance: Austria-Hungary (until 1918); Yugoslavia (1918–1941); Croatia (1941–1945)
- Branch: Austro-Hungarian Army (until 1918); Royal Yugoslav Army (1918–1941); Croatian Home Guard (1941–1945)
- Rank: General
- Unit: (Austria-Hungary) 25th Croatian Regiment
- Commands: (Independent State of Croatia) 2 Infantry Division; (Independent State of Croatia) 10 Infantry Division
- Conflicts: World War I; Eastern Front; Battle of Galicia; Occupation of Međimurje; World War II

Ivan Tomašević (3 September 1892 – 19 September 1945) was a Croatian general who served as a captain in the Austrian-Hungarian Army and as colonel in the Royal Yugoslav Army. After the establishment of the Independent State of Croatia, Tomašević joined the Croatian Home Guard.

== Military career ==
In the Croatian Home Guard, he was at first, from October 1941 until November 1942, a commander of the 2nd Infantry Division. In November 1942 he was named commander of the Lika Littoral Sector. At the end of 1943 he was named ground liaison officer with the German XV Army Corps. At the beginning of 1944 he was promoted to general, and between May and August 1944 he was once again a commander of the Lika Littoral Sector. Tomašević was also a commissionaire of the GRAVSIGUR, the Croatian security police, for districts of Modruš, Vinodol-Podgorje, Lika-Gacka, Krbava-Psat, Bribir and Sana-Luka.

During the Lorković-Vokić plot, Tomašević offered his help to the Allies if they invade the Dalmatian coast in August 1944. The plot failed and its main leaders were arrested.

In December 1944, Tomašević was named commander of the Bihać Division. At the end of the war, in May 1945 he retreated to Austria along with rest of the Croatian Armed Forces. However, in the same month he was extradited to the Yugoslav Partisans back to SFR Yugoslavia. He was tried in front of the Military Council of the Court Martial in Belgrade and sentenced to death on 19 September 1945.

Tomašević is also remembered for his career during World War I, as he was a commander of a company in which Josip Broz Tito, the future authoritarian President of Yugoslavia, served as a sergeant.
