= Vitez (disambiguation) =

Vitez is a town in Bosnia and Herzegovina.

Vitez may also refer to:

== People ==
- Antoine Vitez (1930–1990), French actor, director, and poet
- Dario Vitez (born 1973), Croatian music manager
- Grigor Vitez (1911–1966), Yugoslav writer and translator
- Michael Vitez (born 1957), American journalist
- Silviu Vitez (born 1995), Romanian Muaythai Kickboxer
- Zlatko Vitez (born 1950), Croatian actor

== Other uses ==
- Vitez, title of the recipients of the Knighthood in the Independent State of Croatia
- Vitéz, title of the recipients of the Hungarian Knightly Order of Vitéz
- Vitez (Serbia), mounted medieval warriors
