= 1918 occupation of Međimurje =

Post-World War I conflict in Hungary

- Part of Revolutions and interventions in Hungary
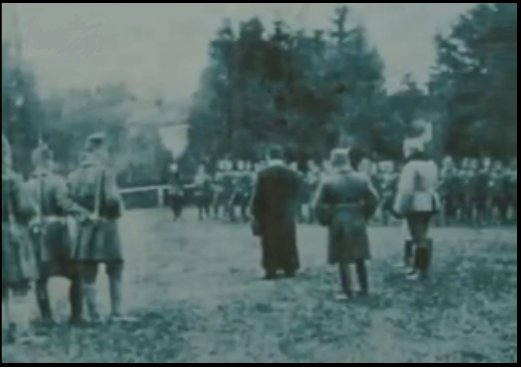
- Surrender of the Hungarian garrison in Čakovec, 24 December 1918
Date	13 November – 24 December 1918
Location	Međimurje 46°23′N 16°26′E
Result	Međimurje seceded from Hungary and joined the Kingdom of Serbs, Croats and Slovenes

Belligerents
State of Slovenes, Croats and Serbs; Kingdom of Serbs, Croats and Slovenes	Kingdom of Hungary; Hungarian Republic

Commanders and leaders
in November: Ivan Tomašević in December: Slavko Kvaternik; Dragutin Perko	György Kühn; Károly Györy

Strength
300 soldiers (November); 3,000 soldiers (December)	Unknown

In the immediate aftermath of World War I, the region of Međimurje was occupied by forces loyal to the National Council of the State of Slovenes, Croats and Serbs, one of the predecessor states to the Kingdom of Yugoslavia, in November and December 1918. Predominantly inhabited by Croats, this territory was a part of the Kingdom of Hungary until it was captured by Yugoslav forces. The Paris Peace Conference (1919–1920) awarded the region to Yugoslavia, which annexed the territory.

The campaign to capture Međimurje began in November 1918, ostensibly in response to Hungarian actions against a revolt by the population of Međimurje. Major Ivan Tomašević led a 300-strong force that was routed by Hungarian forces near Čakovec, the region's largest town. Pleas for military help from the Royal Serbian Army and the French Armée d'Orient were rebuffed due to obligations assumed under the Armistice of Belgrade between the Entente Powers and Hungary that defined the Drava River as the line of Hungarian control in the area. The National Council mounted a new effort on 24 December, sending a 3,000-strong force made up by Slovene volunteers and much of the Royal Croatian Home Guard. Major Dragutin Perko planned the second incursion into Međimurje in greater detail, and he later commanded a large part of the attacking forces.

Međimurje was captured on 24 December without resistance from the Hungarian garrison. Perko was appointed its administrator, and the region was declared a part of the Kingdom of Serbs, Croats and Slovenes with a reference to the principle of self-determination. The Paris Peace Conference later confirmed the region's accession.

== Background ==
On 5–6 October 1918, representatives of political parties representing Slovenes, Croats, and Serbs living in Austria-Hungary organised the National Council of Slovenes, Croats and Serbs as the central organ of the newly proclaimed State of Slovenes, Croats and Serbs encompassing the Slovene Lands, Croatia-Slavonia, Dalmatia, and Bosnia and Herzegovina. The council supplanted the previously established ad hoc group known as the Yugoslav Committee as the body representing the interests of the South Slavs living in Habsburg lands. Its original objective was to campaign for independence of the South Slavs from Austria-Hungary and the unification of those lands with the Serbia, according to Yugoslavism. Serbia had stated its World War I objective of unification of these lands in its 1914 Niš Declaration.

On 29 October, the Sabor of Croatia-Slavonia declared independence from Austria-Hungary. The council met with Serbian representatives in Geneva, Switzerland, in early November and accepted Serbian Prime Minister Nikola Pašić's proposal for achieving union with Serbia. Within days, Serbia repudiated the short-lived Geneva Declaration. Following the Armistice of Villa Giusti between the Entente Powers and Austria-Hungary, the Kingdom of Italy sent its army to secure the part of the territory claimed by the State of Slovenes, Croats and Serbs that had been promised to Italy in the 1915 Treaty of London. Italian forces followed retreating Austro-Hungarian troops returning home from the Italian Front. The Austro-Hungarian troops normally based in Hungary were returning in trains that travelled through Međimurje, a part of the Hungary's Zala County that was located between the Drava and Mura rivers, and was largely inhabited by Croats. According to 1910 census, 82,829 out of 90,387 residents of the region were Croats. During the war, Međimurje-born Croatian lawyer and politician Ivan Novak published a pamphlet advocating self-determination of Međumurje Croats and advocated adding the region to a common South-Slavic state referring to the Fourteen Points of the US President Woodrow Wilson. At the same time, Novak primarily accused Hungary of imposing absolutist legislation with the aim of ruling over non-Hungarians. Although banned by the Hungarian government, Novak's writing shaped the attitudes of Međimurje's Croats to Hungarian rule. In the final phase of the war, food shortages and diseases—especially Spanish flu—contributed to greater social discontent. Furthermore, security throughout Hungary and Croatia-Slavonia was poor because of Green Cadres – deserters who were surviving through banditry.

== First incursion ==
=== Prelude ===
Location of Međimurje on a map of modern Croatia for reference

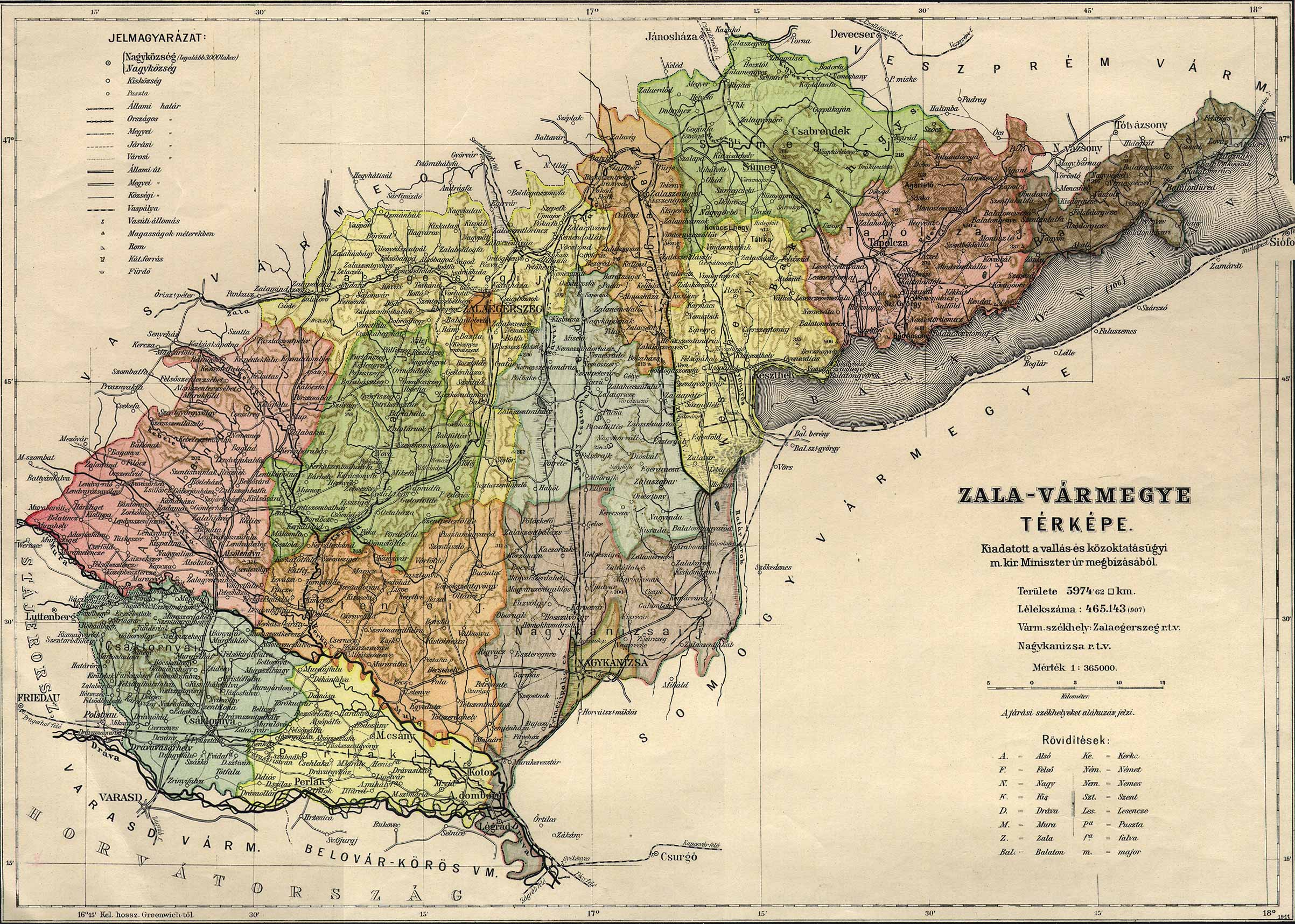
Međimurje as a part of the former Hungarian Zala County in 1910 (at the bottom)

In early November 1918, a revolt began in several villages in eastern Međimurje and quickly spread across the region. The revolt resembled class struggle but the insurrectionists also targeted anyone they perceived as enemies on ethnic grounds. They sought secession and to drive Hungarians out of the region on "Wilsonian grounds", referring to the US president's support for self-determination. The properties of prominent Hungarians were looted, including the Festetics family estate in Gornji Hrašćan and Feštetić Castle in Pribislavec. By 4 November the revolt had largely lost momentum; the next day, the Zala County prefect authorised summary court-martial proceedings in Međimurje. More than 100 people were summarily executed after perfunctory trials. Some civilians fled south across the Drava into Croatia-Slavonia; most went to the city of Varaždin but others fled to Koprivnica. By 10 November, Hungarian regular troops had restored control in a vast majority of the region and two days later they gained control of the village of Nedelišće, the last rebel stronghold.

On 10 November, a popular assembly was held in Varaždin to discuss the civil disturbances in Međimurje. National Council members blamed purported mercenaries and Hungarian Green Cadres for the violence. National Council committees based in Varaždin and Koprivnica dispatched delegations to Zagreb to seek help from the central government and from Colonel Dušan Simović, who had just arrived in Zagreb as a representative of the Royal Serbian Army. In response, National Council defence commissioner Mate Drinković dispatched Major Ivan Tomašević and Lieutenant Viktor Debeljak to Varaždin to devise a plan for the occupation of Međimurje. Tomašević found forces in Varaždin under command of Captain Stjepan Sertić, the commanding officer of the 3rd battalion of the 25th Infantry Regiment of the Royal Croatian Home Guard. A battalion that largely consisted of refugees from Međimurje was raised, as was a National Guards volunteer detachment that included high-school pupils from Varaždin, nominally reporting to the National Council. The entire force consisted of approximately 300 troops. Some of their weapons were taken from Varaždin barracks and others were from disarming soldiers of the 14th Infantry Regiment of the Royal Hungarian Honvéd and the 33rd Infantry Regiment of the Common Army, who were crossing Drava in Varaždin on their way home following the armistice. Tomašević assumed overall command, Oberleutnant Franjo Glogovec led the Međumurje battalion, and Major Marko Georgijević led the volunteer troops.

The same day, the National Council sent Laza Popović, Valerijan Pribićević, and Major Dragutin Perko to Belgrade, where they met with the commander of the Serbian First Army Vojvoda Petar Bojović and Prince Regent Alexander, and sought military intervention by Serbia against Hungary in Međimurje. The Regent directed Perko to meet Vojvoda Petar Mišić the next day to discuss the matter. Mišić told Perko that Serbia could not intervene due to the armistice but promised support if forces of the State of Slovenes, Croats and Serbs captured Međimurje.

=== Repelled advance ===
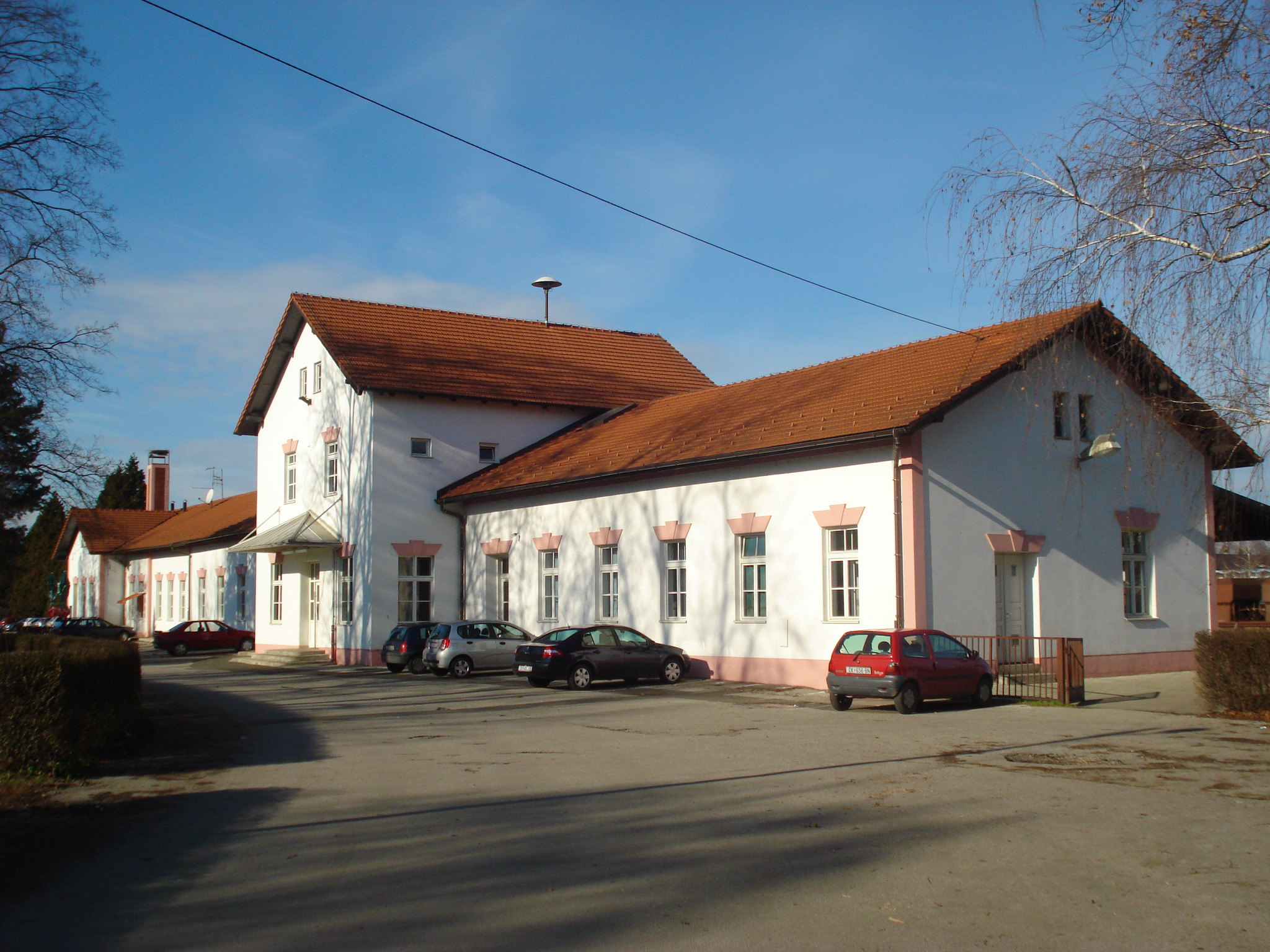
Čakovec railway station was central to Hungarian resistance to November 1918 incursion.

On 13 November, another public assembly was held in Varaždin, at which Tomašević and mayor Pero Magdić announced their plan to launch an attack across the Drava River into Međimurje at 10 p.m. that evening. Magdić pushed for a quick action, hoping to improve his political standing and had a poster calling for volunteers printed. Crowds escorted the available troops to the Drava River bridge. Once across, the attackers positioned several artillery pieces and split into three columns. Sertić led the main advance towards Čakovec, the largest town in Međimurje about 12 kilometres (7.5 miles) to the north. The advance proceeded along the main road through the village of Pušćine. To his right, the volunteer force took the road to Čakovec through the village of Kuršanec. On the left flank, Glogovec led his troops through the village of Gornji Hrašćan before turning east towards Čakovec. According to Tomašević, the aim of the operation's first stage was to capture Čakovec and establish a bridgehead across the Drava before attempting any further advance. The advancing forces reached Čakovec in the morning of 14 November without encountering resistance. This matched the information available to the National Council, which indicated Hungarian troops had withdrawn from Međimurje, except from Čakovec railway station. Forces tasked with security of the railway in Čakovec were under command of Major Károly Györy.

There are conflicting reports on the time and direction of the arrival of additional Hungarian troops at Čakovec; the majority view is that a force several times larger than the opposition arrived in four trains from Nagykanizsa shortly before the troops commanded by Tomašević reached the town. The forces first fought near Čakovec railway station, where Hungarian forces awaited the attackers in prepared positions. The forces commanded by Tomašević fled in disarray to Varaždin across Drava bridges or, after Hungarian cavalry captured both, swam across the river to safety. The fighting concluded the same day in a truce brokered by Varaždin County prefect Franjo Kulmer and Čakovec District chief justice Pál Huszár. Kulmer and Huszár met again on 15 November to arrange the restoration of Varaždin–Čakovec railway traffic and security control of traffic across Drava bridges. Because the city boundary of Varaždin extended slightly north of the Drava River, Huszár agreed no Hungarian forces would be posted at the bridges and that security would be enforced by the State of the Slovenes, Croats and Serbs. According to Simović, Tomašević's defeat was the result of a complete lack of preparation and caused considerable fear of a Hungarian attack against Varaždin. Press reports noted at least four attackers were killed.

== Second incursion ==
=== Preparations for another push ===
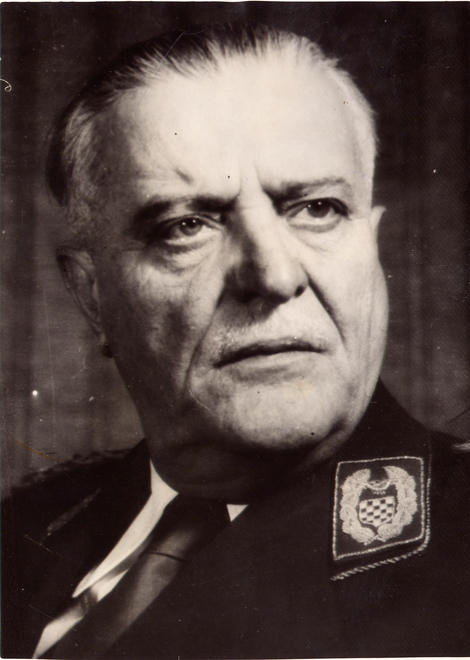
Colonel Slavko Kvaternik was given command of the second attempt to capture Međimurje in 1918.

On 16 November, Simović sent a new request for Serbia's military intervention on behalf of the National Council. The National Council wanted to capture Međimurje and establish a Czech Corridor (an overland link with Czechoslovakia). Three days later, Serbia rejected the request because the Armistice of Belgrade (which had concluded on 13 November) established the Drava River as the boundary of territory under Hungarian control in the area of Međimurje and Varaždin. The Hungarian envoy in Zagreb Gyula Gömbös file a report on 19 November stating that further military action against Hungarian interests in Međimurje was likely and that forces needed for this were assembling near Varaždin. On 23 November, the National Council wrote to General Louis Franchet d'Espèrey asking him to occupy Međimurje. The new attempt at capturing Međimurje was planned for 6 December with the participation of a substantially greater force. Drinković appointed Colonel Slavko Kvaternik to lead the offensive. The attack was postponed following an armed conflict in Zagreb which took place a day before the scheduled operation.

Kvaternik determined the postponed offensive would begin in the early morning of 24 December. Despite the unification of the Kingdom of Serbs, Croats and Slovenes (Kingdom of SHS) at the end of November, the forces deployed in preparation of the attack on Međimurje had not been incorporated into the Serbian army and were still controlled by the National Council. On 11 December, Bojović was ordered not to cross the Drava river, the boundary determined by the Armistice of Belgrade. On 20 December, the supreme command of the Royal Serbian Army notified Colonel Milan Pribićević, who was attached to the liaison office in Zagreb, that neither the Serbian nor the French Armée d'Orient would directly support the offensive.

=== Order of battle ===
Perko prepared the plan for the second incursion into Međimurje and Kvaternik finalised it. Kvaternik had 3,000 troops assigned to seven battalions who were equipped with 24 cannon, 52 machine guns, an armoured car, and eleven lorries. The force also had two cavalry squadrons, a medical detachment, and a signal corps company. The attacking force was arrayed along two major axes; the bulk of the force advanced north from Varaždin to Čakovec under command of Perko and a smaller part of the force was deployed to the west of Međimurje under command of Major Ivo Henneberg, who was tasked with advancing east from Ormož to Čakovec and from the village of Štrigova along the Mura river. A reserve force consisting of one infantry battalion of the Royal Serbian Army was supported by a half of a cavalry squadron and a machine-gun detachment led by Major Aksentije Radojković. The reserve force was assembled near Varaždin and did not take part in the offensive actions. Kvaternik set up his headquarters in Varaždin to direct the operation. Hungarian forces in Međimurje were considerably smaller; most of them were stationed in Čakovec and small contingents were deployed in large villages in the region. The force was commanded by Colonel György Kühn and Györy was the second in command.

Order of battle of the force led by Slavko Kvaternik, 24 December 1918
Group	Unit	Commanders
South (Perko)	Cadets and other students	Captain Šega, Captain Izer, Oberleutnant Krpan
South (Perko)	Međimurje volunteer unit	Oberleutnant Franjo Glogovec
South (Perko)	26th Infantry Regiment of the Royal Croatian Home Guard (1st and 2nd (Karlovac) battalions)	Major Karlo Pogledić
South (Perko)	25th Infantry Regiment of the Royal Croatian Home Guard (3rd (Varaždin) battalion)	Captain Stjepan Sertić
South (Perko)	27th Infantry Regiment of the Royal Croatian Home Guard (3rd (Nova Gradiška) battalion)	Captain Radoslav Rački
South (Perko)	Two cavalry squadrons drawn from the 10th Hussars of the Royal Croatian Home Guard	Major Marko Georgijević, Captain Matija Čanić
West (Henneberg)	27th Infantry Regiment of the Royal Croatian Home Guard (one (Sisak) battalion)	Major Ivo Henneberg
West (Henneberg)	Volunteer legion composed of Sokol members and former Austro-Hungarian Navy marines	Frigate lieutenant Antić, Captain Erminije Jurišić
West (Henneberg)	Two companies of Slovene volunteers (Razkrižje area)	captains Dekleva and Rakuš
Reserve	One infantry battalion of the Royal Serbian Army	Major Aksentije Radojković
Note: The Royal Croatian Home Guard was in the process of disbanding. (Note: The National Council decided to disband the 25th Infantry Regiment on 5 December 1918 prompted by a clash with elements of the regiment in Zagreb that day. On 10 December, the National Council decided to disband all armed units formally under its command including all former Croat units within the Austro-Hungarian Army and Navy – such as the Royal Croatian Home Guard – as potentially unreliable. The process was not completed until 1919.)

=== Renewed offensive ===
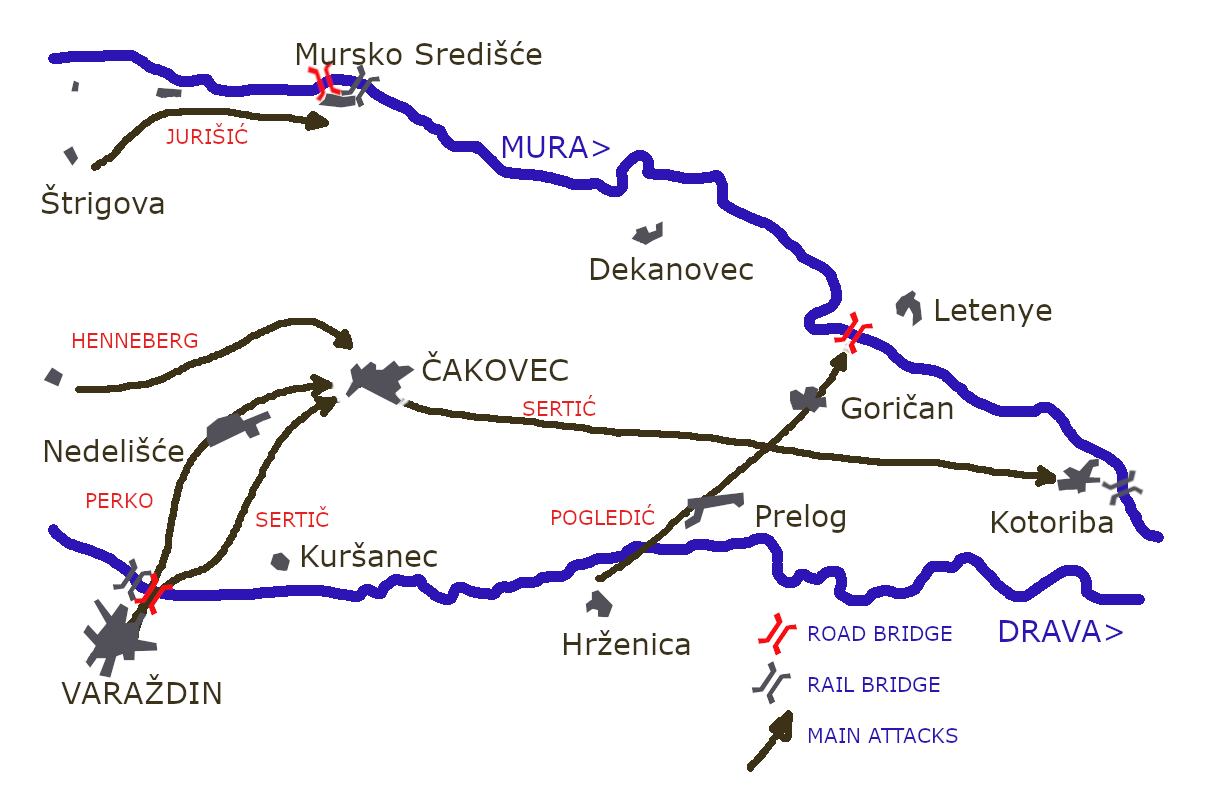
A schematic map of main axes of attack in Međimurje on 24 December 1918

Kvaternik aimed to first capture Čakovec and the rail and road crossings of the Mura river in Mursko Središće and Kotoriba that connected Međimurje to the rest of Zala County. Ultimately, his goal was to secure the entire territory south of the Mura River. The attack commenced at 6 a.m. of 24 December. A part of the group led by Perko advanced along the main road from Varaždin to Čakovec. By 8 a.m., forces led by Major Karlo Pogledić—assisted by Tomašević (26th Infantry Regiment)—crossed the Drava without opposition, in boats and on rafts procured from local population of Hrženica. They captured Prelog, followed Donji Kraljevec and Goričan, before advancing to the Mura bridge south of Letenye to block the main road to Budapest. The forces advancing from the West were split in two. Major Ivo Henneberg advanced from Središče ob Dravi in Styria towards Čakovec to capture the left bank of the Drava and join Perko in Čakovec – securing Perko's left flank. The second part of the force advancing from Styria moved through the villages of Štrigova and Sveti Martin na Muri. Led by Captain Erminije Jurišić, it was tasked with capturing bridges in Mursko Središće and nearby pontoon ferries. Capturing other ferries located further downstream was assigned to a cavalry squadron led by Captain Matija Čanić.

By 10 a.m., the attacking force gained control of the southern bank of the Mura and surrounded Čakovec. Perko sent Georgijević to ride into Čakovec and request surrender of the town after capturing sixteen Hungarian soldiers posted to guard its southern approach. Györy formally surrendered near the town's railway station at 10:30 while Perko's forces took positions in the town. Györy said that he did not recognise any new authority and that the attackers had violated the Armistice of Belgrade. Perko informed Kvaternik of the capture of Čakovec at 11 a.m. by telephone and Kvaternik drove to the town to meet with Györy. A passenger train was seized in Čakovec and emptied of passengers before it was boarded by half a battalion of infantry led by Sertić. They took the train to the village of Kotoriba and disembarked there to capture the last remaining unoccupied part of Međimurje – the area between that village and Legrad, near the confluence of the Mura and Drava. By 1 p.m., Sertić had secured that area, placing the entire Međimurje region under the control of Kvaternik's forces. They had not faced any armed resistance. Contemporary media reported the deaths of three Hungarian soldiers in the offensive. There were no reports of any deaths among the attacking force.

== Aftermath ==
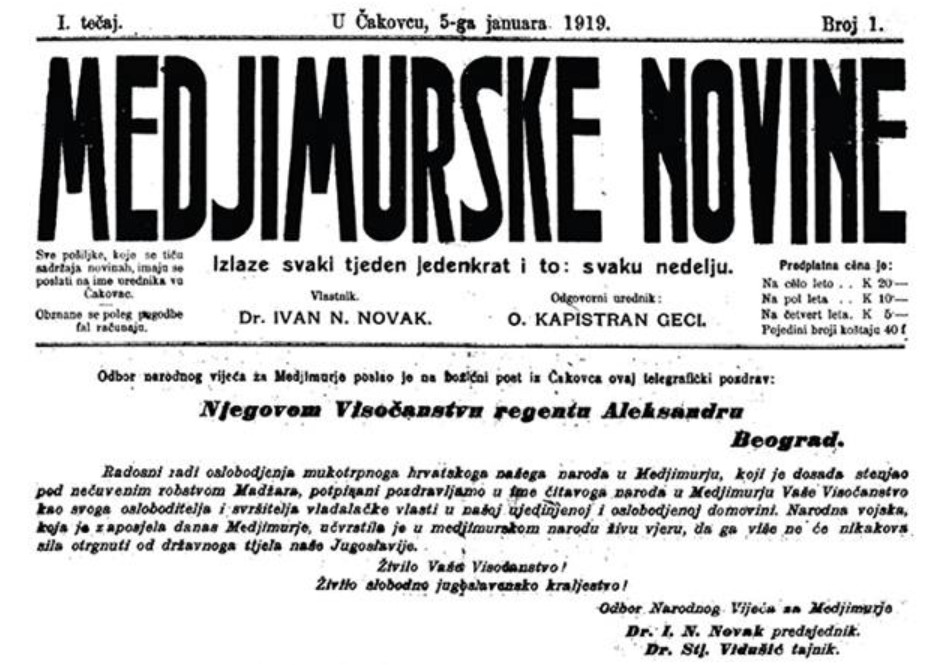
Međimurske novine published the telegram sent to Regent Alexander upon capture of Međimurje.

In the afternoon of 24 December, Kvaternik had a letter distributed to clergy in Međimurje, instructing them to read his proclamation urging the population to recognise the new authorities. The letter said that Međimurje belonged to the Kingdom of SHS from that day; it was read at that day's Midnight Mass, which concluded with a rendition of the anthem Lijepa naša domovino. The regional committee of the National Council scheduled a public assembly in Čakovec for 9 January 1919. On 25 December, a representative of the Hungarian government arrived to request Kvaternik's explanation for the incursion before returning to Budapest the same day. Perko was appointed civilian and military administrator of Međimurje; among his first acts in the role were the establishment of Međimurske novine and the banning of Hungarian-language (Muraköz) newspapers. The regional committee of the National Council sent a telegram to the Regent Alexander informing him of the addition of Međimurje to the country (referred to as "Yugoslavia") on 24 December; the Regent telegraphed them back a congratulatory message on New Year's Eve.

On 9 January, approximately 10,000 people gathered at the public assembly, which adopted a resolution declaring that Međimurje was seceding from Hungary and acceding to the Kingdom of SHS. The declaration, which telegraphed to Regent Alexander, made references to the principle of self-determination and praised President Wilson as a champion of that principle. Provisions of the declaration were upheld by the Paris Peace Conference, which defined Hungarian borders through the Treaty of Trianon and left Međimurje to Yugoslavia.

During World War II, following the 1941 invasion of Yugoslavia, Međimurje was captured and annexed by Hungary. The puppet state the Independent State of Croatia, which was established by the Axis powers in 1941, unsuccessfully disputed the Hungarian possession of Međimurje. In the final weeks of the war, the Yugoslav Partisans liberated the region. Following the breakup of Yugoslavia, Međimurje became part of Croatia. Since 2005, 9 January is celebrated in Međimurje as a memorial day to commemorate the 1919 resolution to secede from Hungary.

== Sources ==
- Banac, Ivo (1984). The National Question in Yugoslavia: Origins, History, Politics. Ithaca: Cornell University Press. ISBN 0-8014-1675-2.
- Beneš, Jakub S. (2017). "The Green Cadres and the Collapse of Austria-Hungary in 1918". Past & Present (236). Oxford: Oxford University Press: 207–241. doi:10.1093/pastj/gtx028. ISSN 0031-2746.
- Beti, Ivica (9 January 2019). ""Domorodci! Međimurci! Suženjstvu je našemu kraj!"" [Natives! People of Međimurje! Our Slavery Ends!]. Večernji list (in Croatian). ISSN 0350-5006. Archived from the original on 16 January 2021.
- Kiš, Patricia (6 July 2020). "Ratna ljubav" [Wartime Love]. Jutarnji list (in Croatian). ISSN 1331-5692. Archived from the original on 28 November 2020.
- Huzjan, Vladimir (2005). "Raspuštanje Hrvatskog domobranstva nakon završetka Prvog svjetskog rata" [The Demobilization of the Croatian Home Guards After the End of the First World War]. Časopis za suvremenu povijest (in Croatian). 37 (2). Zagreb: Croatian Institute of History: 445–465. ISSN 0590-9597.
- Martan, Željko (2016). "Nemiri u Hrvatskoj od proglašenja Države Slovenaca, Hrvata i Srba do Prosinačkih žrtava" [Riots in Croatia from the declaration of the State of Slovens, Croats and Serbs to the December victims]. Povijest U Nastavi (in Croatian). 14 (27). Zagreb: Društvo za hrvatsku povjesnicu: 1–30. ISSN 1334-1375.
- Newman, John Paul (2015). Yugoslavia in the Shadow of War: Veterans and the Limits of State Building, 1903–1945. Cambridge: Cambridge University Press. ISBN 9781107070769.
- Ramet, Sabrina P. (2006). The Three Yugoslavias: State-building and Legitimation, 1918–2005. Bloomington: Indiana University Press. ISBN 9780253346568.
- Štambuk-Škalić, Marina; Matijević, Zlatko, eds. (2008). "Narodno vijeće Slovenaca, Hrvata i Srba u Zagrebu 1918–1919. (izabrani dokumenti)" [National Council of Slovenes, Croats and Serbs in Zagreb 1918–1919 (Selected Documents)]. Fontes: Izvori Za Hrvatsku Povijest (in Croatian). 14 (1). Zagreb: Croatian State Archives: 71–596. ISSN 1330-6804.
- Tomasevich, Jozo (2001). War and Revolution in Yugoslavia, 1941–1945: Occupation and Collaboration. Stanford: Stanford University Press. ISBN 978-0-8047-0857-9.
- Vuk, Ivan (2019). "Pripojenje Međimurja Kraljevstvu Srba, Hrvata i Slovenaca: Od neuspjeloga pokušaja 13. studenog do uspješnoga zaposjedanja Međimurja 24. prosinca 1918. godine" [The Annexation of Međimurje to the Kingdom of Serbs, Croats and Slovenes: From the unsuccessful attempt on 13 November to the successful occupation of Međimurje on 24 December 1918]. Časopis za suvremenu povijest (in Croatian). 51 (2). Zagreb: Croatian Institute of History: 507–532. doi:10.22586/csp.v51i2.8927. ISSN 0590-9597. S2CID 204456373.
