= 1st Infantry Division (Independent State of Croatia) =

- Croatian: 1. pješačka divizija
- Active: 1 August 1941 – 1 August 1943
- Country: Croatia
- Branch: Croatian Home Guard
- Type: Infantry
- Engagements: World War II

The Croatian 1st Infantry Division (Croatian: 1. pješačka divizija) was an infantry unit in the Army of the Independent State of Croatia during World War II.

The 1st Infantry Division was formed on or around August 1, 1941, with Colonel (Pukovnik in the Croatian Army rank) Emanuel Balley in command with its headquarters located at Zagreb. In its order of battle on October 21, 1941, the 1st Infantry Division included the 1st, 2nd, and 11th Infantry Regiments and the I and II Artillery Groups.

The 1st Infantry Division was under the subordination of the I Territorial Corps from November 1941 to July 1943. By April 1942 the divisional headquarters had been moved to Bjelovar, east-northeast of Zagreb, where it was still located by February 1943. Divisional garrison responsibilities and tactical operations were carried out by sector commands at Koprivnica, Ludbreg, Križevci, Lepavina, and Varaždinske Toplice.

The divisional headquarters and staff were disbanded around August 1, 1943.

== Commanders ==
(Dates are uncertain)

- Colonel Emanuel Balley (August 1941 - April 1942)
- Colonel Ivan Pavić (? - August 1942)
- Colonel Matija Murković (? - December 1942)
- Colonel Stjepan Peričić (? - July 1943)
