= Order of the Crown of King Zvonimir =

- Grand Order with Sash and Danica star
- Type: Order
- Awarded for: "Merits done, in peace or in war, for the Croatian people and the Independent State of Croatia"
- Presented by: Independent State of Croatia 1941 - 1945 Croatian Government in exile 1951 - 1962 Croatian Council from 1962
- Eligibility: Civilians and Military Personnel
- Status: National order
- Established: 17 May 1941
- First award: 1941
- Final award: 1963

Highlights
- Total: 6000 (1941 - 1945) 500 (after 1945)
- Ribbon of the Order of the Crown of King Zvonimir

Precedence
- Next (lower): Medal of the Crown of King Zvonimir

The Order of the Crown of King Zvonimir (Croatian: Red krune kralja Zvonimira) is an order awarded by the Independent State of Croatia (NDH) and later the Croatian Council in exile.

== History ==
The sovereignty of the State was passed on the May 15, 1941 by the Law on the sovereignty of the crown of Zvonimir which made the Independent State of Croatia a de jure monarchy with the second official name (lesser in usage) being the Kingdom of Croatia as it was proclaimed by Poglavnik Ante Pavelić. The law made the crown of Zvonimir the fons honorum of the Order.

The Order was established as a "visible sign of decoration for merits done, in peace or in war, for Croatian people and Independent State of Croatia" on May 17, 1941. The bearers of the grand order and bearers of the first class order were given the title of knight (vitez). The Order was awarded to both domestic and foreign individuals, there are 483 recipients of the Order from 1941 until 1945, and around 50 after 1945 with the title of vitez (chevalier).

== Order insignia ==
=== Cross ===
A white Croatian cross (also called Croatian trefoil or Zvonimir's cross). On the front in the center it featured the Zvonimir's crown and interlace on the cracks of the cross. The back of the award contained the years 1076 — King Zvonimir's crowning, and 1941 — the establishment of the NDH. with the inscription Bog i Hrvati (God and Croats). The cross was designed by colonel Jakov Machiedo who was the first ceremonial of the Order. The civilian insignia of the Order consists only of the Zvonimir Cross, while the military version of the insignia consits of two additional swords. The military version could also be awarded with oakleaves for gallentry.

=== Ribbon ===
For awards in peacetime the ribbon of the Order is white with two red stripes, while for awards in war time (military personnel) red with two white stripes. The Order had a Grand sash, neck ribbon and medal ribbons. The ribbons (in both civilian or military forms) are given for large cross variants, miniatures and rosettes.

== Leadership of the Order ==
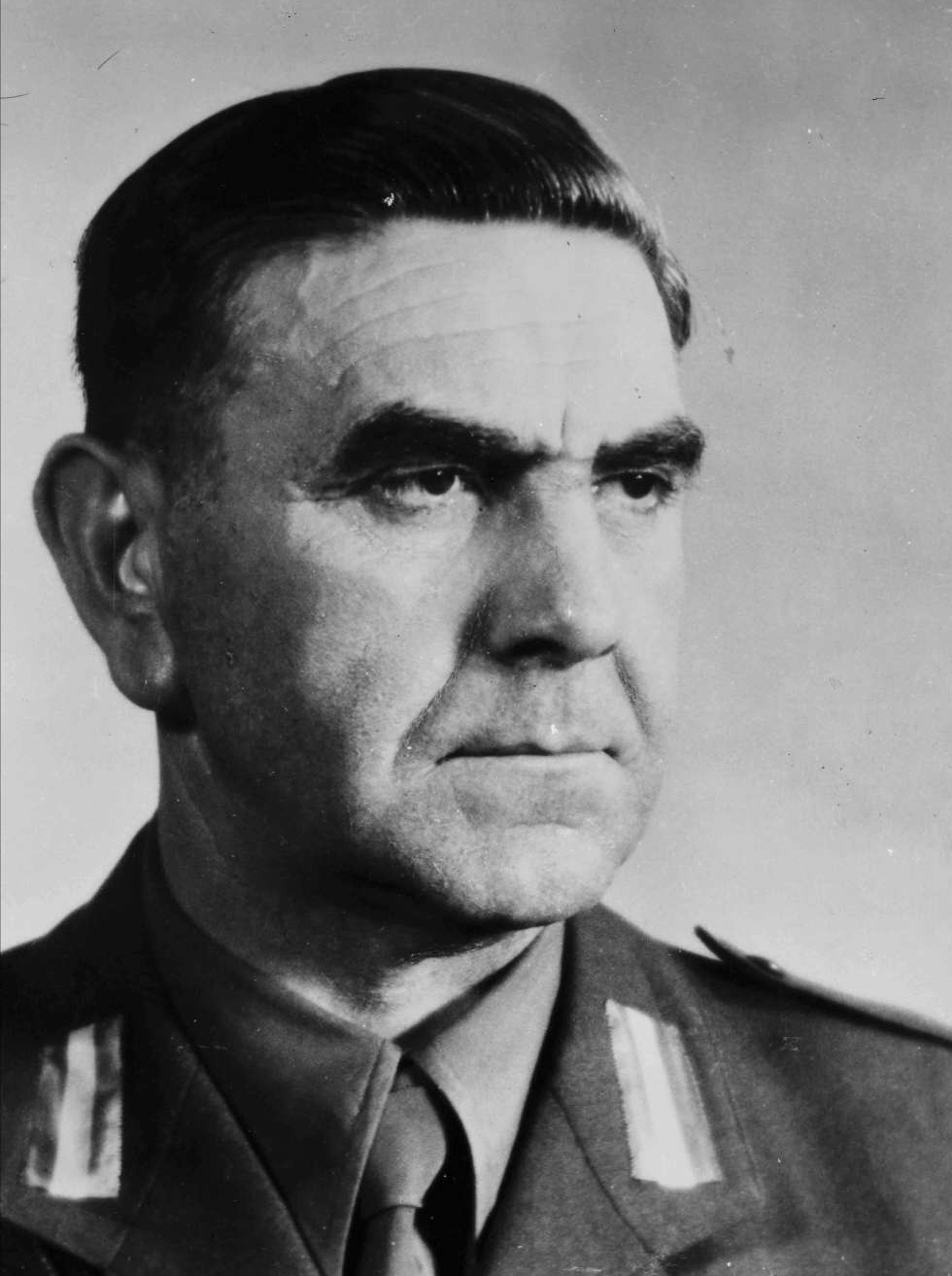
Poglavnik Ante Pavelić, Sovereign of the Order

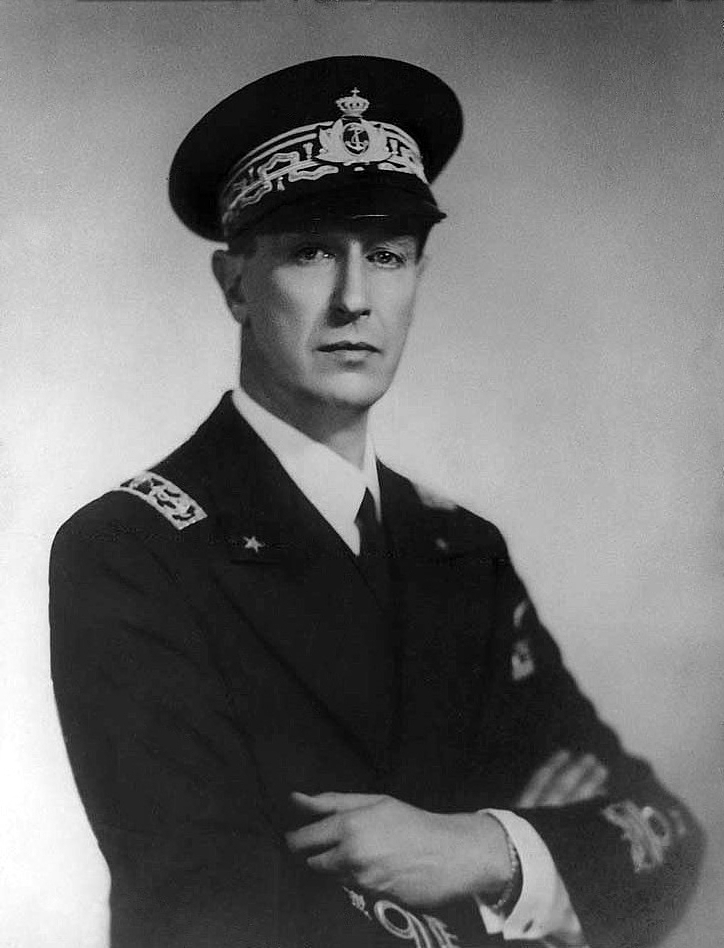
King Aimone Tomislav II, Dynastic Head of the Order

=== Heads of the Order ===
- Ante Pavelić as Poglavnik Head of the Order (1941 - 1959)
- Aimone Tomislav II King and Dynastic Head of the Order (1941 - 1943)
- Stjepan Heffer Appointed successor by Pavelić (1959 - 1973)

=== Officers of the Order ===
- Džafer Kulenović Doglavnik (1941-1945) and President of the Council (1951-1956)
- Ivan Perčević Head of the Order office and notary (1941 - 1946)
- Jakov Machiedo Ceremonial (1941 - 1944)
- Count Petar Pejačević Minister and Ceremonial (1951 - 1987)
- Vjekoslav Vrančić Minister (1951 - 1990)
- Erih Lisak Aide-de-camp (1941 - 1946)
- Viktor Ivan Prebeg Aide-de-camp (1942 - 1943) Count of the Order office (1943-1945)

Grand Order (civilian) of the Order of the Crown of King Zvonimir

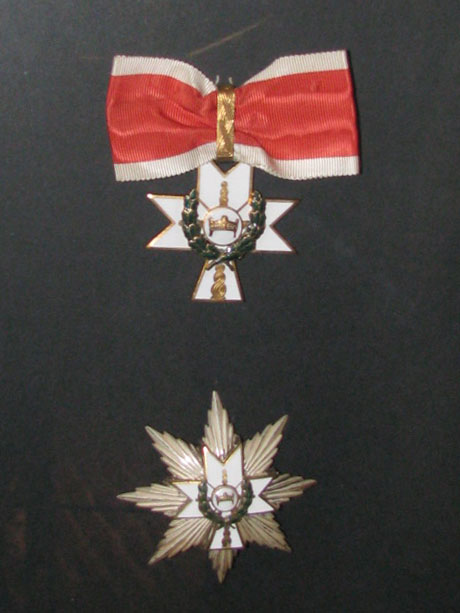
1st Class Cross with Danica star

== Ranks and classes of the Order ==
=== Grand Order with star and sash - special class ===
- Ante Pavelić as Poglavnik and State Head of the Order
- Aimone Tomislav II Special class as King and Dynastic Head of the Order

=== Foreign Royals and Heads of State ===
Grand Order with Danica star and sash

- Italy King Vittorio Emanuele III in 1942.
- Hungary Regent Miklós Horthy in 1942.
- Spain Caudillo Francisco Franco in 1942.
- Bulgaria Tsar Boris III in 1942.
- Romania King Michael I in 1942.
- Finland President Risto Ryti in 1942.
- Jordan King Hussein in 1963.

=== Grand Order with star and sash ===
With the right of the title vitez (knight)

- Džafer Kulenović as Doglavnik
- Ivan Perčević Head of the Order office and notary
- Adolf Sabljak
- Grand Admiral Erich Raeder
- Generaloberst Alexander Löhr (with Swords on 30 August 1942)

=== 1st Class Cross with Swords ===
With the right of the title vitez (knight). The swords indicated military personnel or wartime acknowledgment.

- Johannes-Rudolf Mühlenkamp
- Hans-Erich Voss (26 September 1942)
- Miroslav Navratil
- Odilo Globocnik
- Vilko Begić
- Fedor Dragojlov
- Tomislav Sertić
- Slavko Štancer
- Gjuro Grujić
- Artur Gustović
- Đuro Jakčin
- Vjekoslav Vrančić
- Ibrahim Pirić-Pjanić

=== 1st Class Cross with Star ===
With the right of the title vitez (knight)

- Franjo Lukac
- Josip Metzger
- Hans Oster
- Helmuth von Pannwitz
- Kornél Oszlányi
- Erih Lisak
- Galeazzo Ciano

=== 1st Class Cross ===
With the right of the title vitez (knight)

- Vladimir Laxa
- Hans Baur, 1943
- Hans Henrici
- Ferdinand Jodl
- Otto Kumm
- Helwig Luz
- Antun Bonifačić

=== 2nd Class Cross ===
- Karl-Wolfgang Redlich

=== 3rd Class Cross ===
- Eduard Bunić
- Ernst Hildebrandt

== Sources ==
- Zakonska odredba o osnutku Reda i Kolajne krune kralja Zvonimira (in Croatian)
