= Slavko Štancer =

Croatian commander-in-chief and inspector-general (1872–1945)

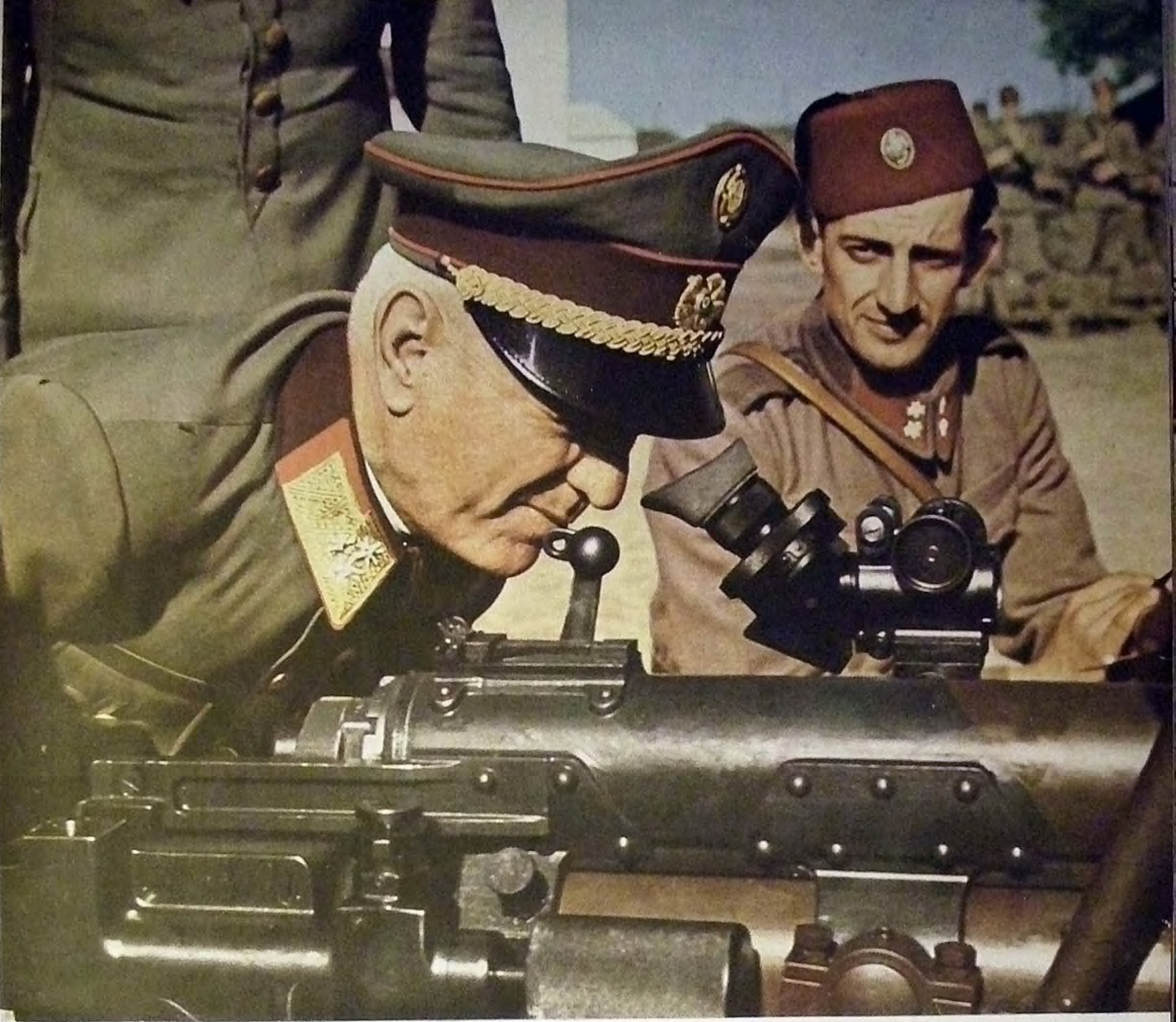
Slavko Štancer

Slavko Štancer (26 July 1872 – 16 June 1945) was a former Austro-Hungarian officer and Croatian army general who served as commander-in-chief and inspector-general of the land component of the Army of the Independent State of Croatia during the Second World War, in 1941. His surname is also sometimes written "Stanzer" or "Stancer".

Štancer served under the Poglavnik Ante Pavelić and was awarded the honorary title Vitez ("knight") when he received the Order of the Crown of King Zvonimir. Štancer was appointed commander-in-chief of the ground forces on 16 April 1941. Later, Štancer headed the Croatian Military court. After the fall of the Independent State of Croatia, Štancer was captured, tried and sentenced to death by the communist Partisans. He was found dead in his cell the night before his scheduled execution.
