= Vilko Begić =

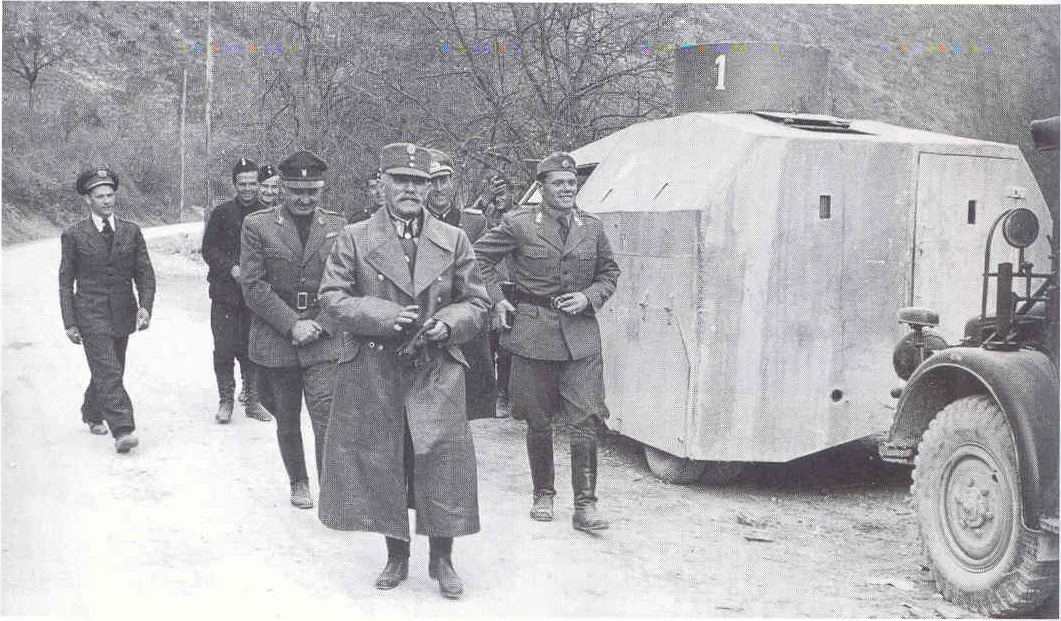
- General Begić (in the center), Minister of Forestry and Mining Ivica Frković (left), and Lieutenant Colonel Rafael Boban (right)
- Born: January 20, 1874
- Died: 1946?
- Military career
- Allegiance: Austria-Hungary; Independent State of Croatia
- Branch: Austro-Hungarian Army (until 1918); Domobranstvo (1941–1945)
- Service years: Before 1914 – 1918; 1941–1945
- Rank: Colonel General
- Unit: Poglavnik’s Bodyguard Division
- Conflicts: World War I World War II

Vilko Begić (20 January 1874 – 1946?) was a Croatian military officer and Nazi collaborator.

== Biography ==
Begić was born in Čazma, Austria-Hungary, that today is in Croatia.

He was quartermaster colonel in the Austro-Hungarian Army. After World War I he was a journalist. He was often attacked by the Yugoslav gendarmerie. In 1924 he was arrested because of an illegal border pass, in 1929 he was accused of terrorism, then he was judged together with Vladko Maček. In 1933 he was arrested because of spreading leaflets. He was a close associate of Vladko Maček After the proclamation of the Independent State of Croatia he joined the Croatian Domobranstvo, a regular army of the Croatia at the time. He was promoted to the rank of General of the infantry and on 14 August 1941 he was named state secretary in the Ministry of Defence. He was advisor to Poglavnik Ante Pavelić. In April 1943 he escorted Pavelić in a visit to Adolf Hitler. At the beginning of September 1943 he was named as Doglavnik (deputy of Poglavnik) and thus became a member of Doglavničko vijeće (in English Doglavnik Council). In May 1944 he became commander of the Coastal Section "Neretva". In August and in September 1944 he was commissioner of RAVSIGUR (Croatian: Ravnateljstvo sigurnosti, 'Directorate of Security') for the protection of the grand counties of Cetina, Usora, Soli, Vrhbosna, Hum and Dubrava. In February 1944 he was promoted to the rank of lieutenant general, and in April 1945 he was promoted to colonel general, the highest rank in the Croatian Armed Forces on the authority of Ante Pavelić. He also had the title of "vitez" (knight). In May 1945, when Croatian forces retreated to Austria to surrender to British, he disappeared The former Minister of the Interior of the First Slovak Republic Alexander Mach who was being held as a prisoner of war in a US camp in Natternberg near Deggendorf in 1945 recounts Vilko Begić’ remarks in his diaries, e. g. in the entry for 31 July 1945, which implies that Vilko Begić was still arrested in the camp in Natternberg at that time. Some say that US military authorities extradited him to the Communist Yugoslav military authorities, after which he was shot, but also, other versions say he was seen at an Allied camp near Salzburg in 1946, after that everything is unknown.
