= Fedor Dragojlov =

Croatian general

Fedor Dragojlov (born in 1881 – died 1961 in Buenos Aires, Argentina) was a colonel-general in the Croatian Home Guard, as well as its chief-of-staff from 1943 to 1944. He was Eastern Orthodox Christian.

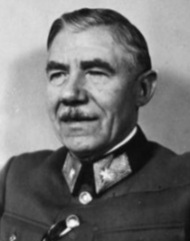
Fedor Dragojlov In Homeguard Uniform

He was one of only seven to receive the Order of the Crown of King Zvonimir with star and oak leaves, which granted him the title of vitez (knight).
