= Vladimir Laxa =

Croatian general

- Vladimir Laxa
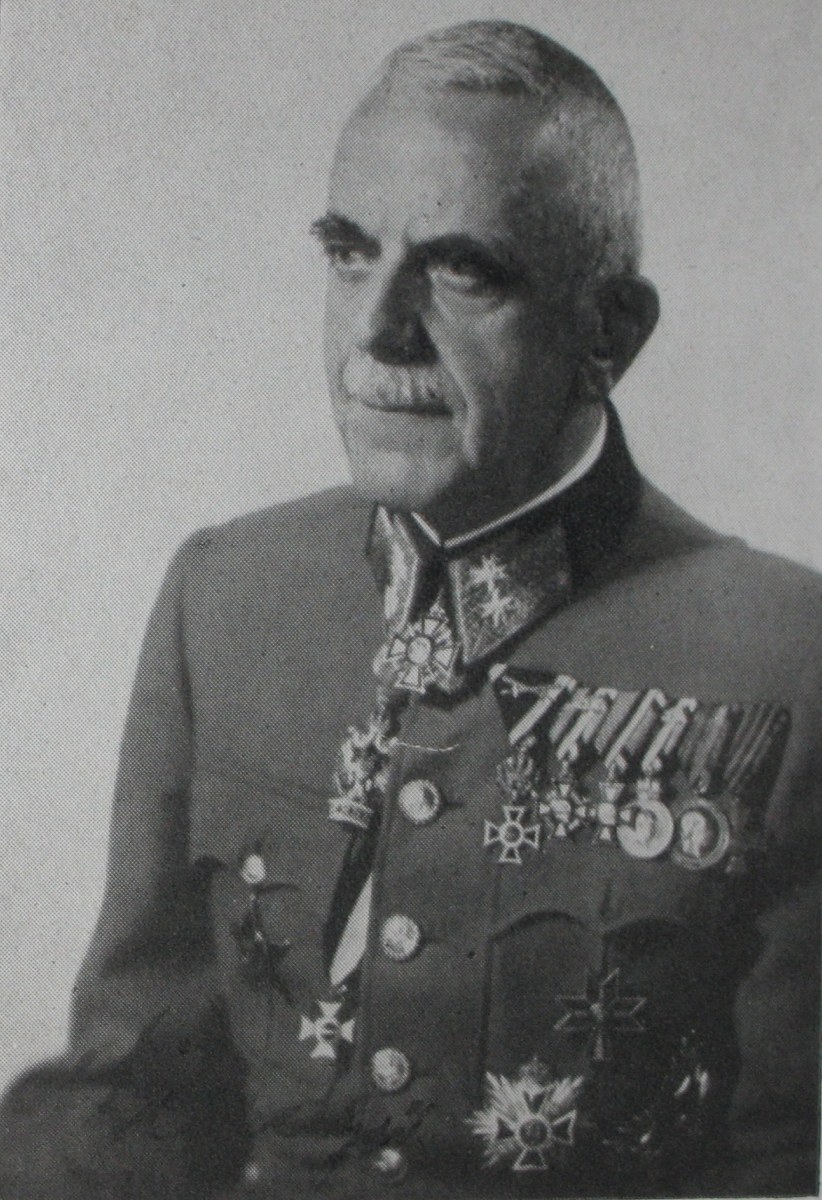
- Born: 21 January 1870; Sisak, Croatia-Slavonia, Austria-Hungary
- Died: 23 June 1945 (aged 75); Zagreb, SR Croatia, Democratic Federal Yugoslavia
- Military career
- Allegiance: Austria-Hungary (1890–1918); Kingdom of Yugoslavia (1918–1941); Independent State of Croatia (1941–1945)
- Branch: Austro-Hungarian Army; Royal Yugoslav Army; Croatian Home Guard
- Rank: General
- Commands: 18th Mountain Brigade

Vladimir Laxa (Croatian pronunciation: [laksa]; 21 January 1870 – 23 June 1945) was a Croatian general who served in the Austro-Hungarian Army during World War I and in the Croatian Home Guard during World War II. During World War II, he was Army Chief of Staff of the Axis puppet state, the Independent State of Croatia (Croatian: Nezavisna Država Hrvatska, NDH), from June 1941 until August 1942, when he resigned his commission purportedly in protest of the atrocities committed by the Ustaše Militia.

Laxa was commissioned into the Austro-Hungarian Army on 18 August 1890. During the First World War he was commander of the 18th Mountain Brigade, and was one of only 131 men who were awarded the Military Order of Maria Theresa, the highest Habsburg decoration; in Laxa's case for the “heroism, enormous bravery, and tenaciously successful defence of positions” by himself and his men on Škabrijel (Italian: Mount Saint Gabriel) during the Eleventh Battle of the Isonzo in 1917. After the war ended, he joined the newly formed army of (what became known later as) the Kingdom of Yugoslavia.

The German-led Axis invasion of Yugoslavia commenced on 6 April 1941, leading to the proclamation of the Independent State of Croatia on 10 April. Laxa was initially the Army second in command (April–June 1941) and then chief-of-staff. During the war he was awarded the state's Order of the Crown of King Zvonimir. In October 1941 he was transferred to the NDH High Command. He took part in a conference in Opatija (2–3 March 1942) that planned the Third anti-partisan offensive, codenamed ‘Trio’. He remained in the NDH high command until August 1942 when he resigned (although there is a source that claims that Laxa was "removed by order of Marshal Slavko Kvaternik and retired") due to his protestations about atrocities committed by Ustaše irregulars. Laxa was among the exodus that were forcibly returned to the Partisans at Bleiburg, in the Bleiburg repatriations. He was executed in 1945, and, after Croatia's independence in the 1990s, subsequently buried in Mirogoj cemetery.

== See also ==
- List of Military Order of Maria Theresa recipients of Croatian descent
- List of Croatian soldiers
