= Croatian Armed Forces (Independent State of Croatia) =

1944–1945 military in the Axis puppet state

- Hrvatske oružane snage (Croatian)
- The war flag of the Independent State of Croatia.
- Founded: 1944
- Disbanded: 1945
- Headquarters: Zagreb

Leadership
- Poglavnik: Ante Pavelić
- Minister of Armed Forces: see list

Personnel
- Military age: 18 years
- Active personnel: 170,000 (1945)

Industry
- Foreign suppliers: Nazi Germany

Related articles
- Ranks: Military ranks of the Independent State of Croatia

The Croatian Armed Forces united the Croatian Home Guard and the Ustaše Militia in the Independent State of Croatia (NDH) for around five months from 1944 to 1945. It was established by the fascist Ustaše regime of Ante Pavelić in the NDH an Axis puppet state in Yugoslavia during World War II.

The Croatian Armed Forces was reorganized in November 1944 to combine the units of the Ustaše and Domobrani into eighteen divisions, comprising 13 infantry, two mountain, two assault and one replacement Croatian divisions, each with its own organic artillery and other support units. There were also several armoured units, equipped in late 1944 with 20 Panzer IIIN and 15 Panzer IVF and H medium tanks. From early 1945, the Croatian divisions were allocated to various German corps and by March 1945 were holding the Southern Front. Securing the rear areas were some 32,000 men of the Croatian Gendarmerie, organised into 5 Police Volunteer Regiments plus 15 independent battalions, equipped with standard light infantry weapons, including mortars.

By the end of March 1945, it was obvious to the Army command that, although the front remained intact, they would eventually be defeated by sheer lack of ammunition. For this reason, the decision was made to retreat across the border into the Austrian part of Nazi Germany, in order to surrender to the British forces advancing north from Italy.

== Croatian Home Guard ==
The Croatian Home Guard was formed in April 1941 a few days after the founding of the NDH itself. The task of the new Croatian armed forces was to defend the new state against both foreign and domestic enemies. By the end of 1941, the home guard forces consisted of 85,000 and the national police force of about 6,000.

During 1943, four Jäger Brigades were set up, each with four 500-man battalions in two regiments and an artillery group equipped for hilly terrain. The home guard reached its maximum size at the end of 1943, when it had 130,000 men. By 1944, the home guard had 90,000 men, though only 20,000 were front-line combat troops, organised in three mountain, four Jager and eight static garrison brigades, and the 1st Recruit Training Division.

== Ustaše Militia ==
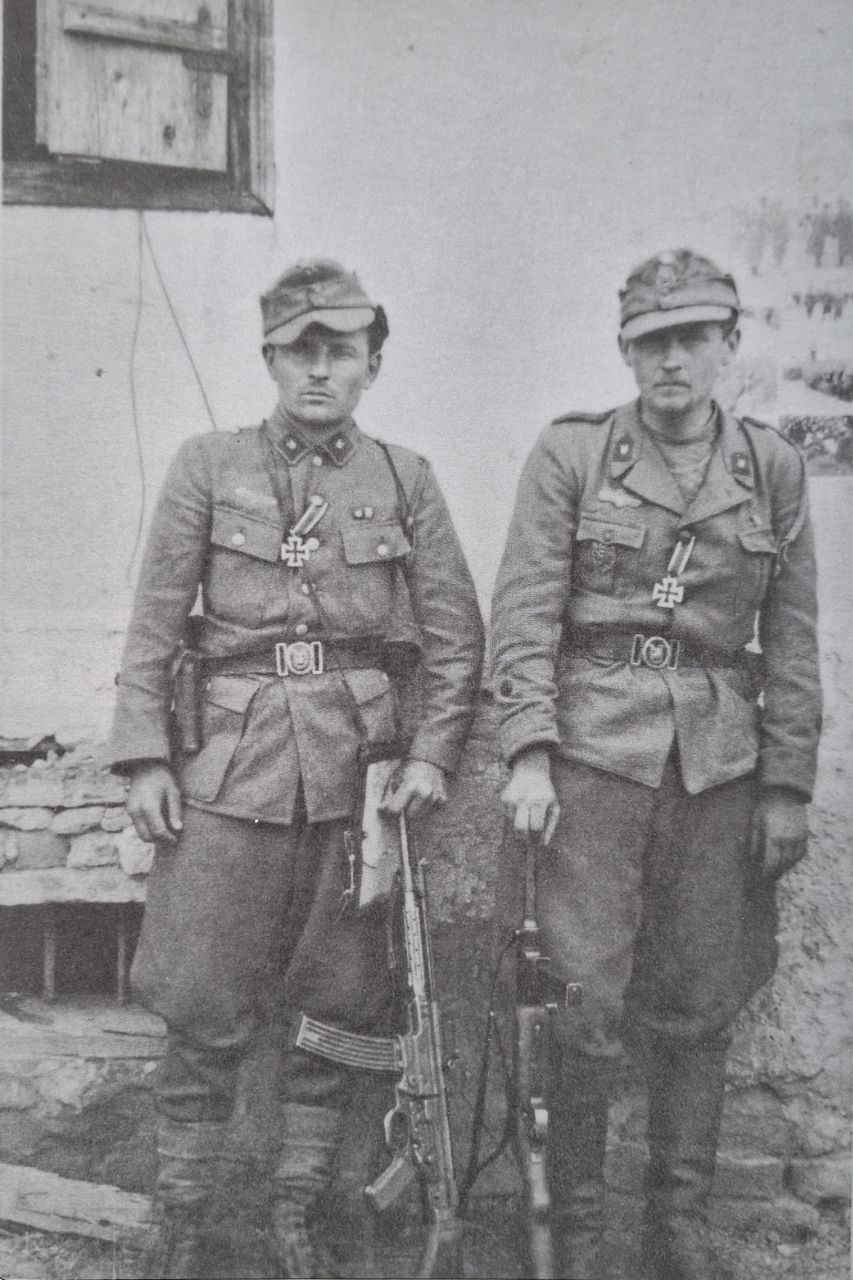
Two Ustasha lieutenants from the 13th Standing Active Brigade

The Ustaše militia was created on 11 April 1941 when Marshal Slavko Kvaternik appointed a separate staff to control the various volunteer groups that had risen throughout the NDH as the Yugoslav Army collapsed in the face of the Axis invasion. On 18 March 1942, a law decree organised the armed forces into the Home Guard, Navy, Air Force, Gendarmerie, and the Ustaše militia. By September 1943, shortly after the Italian surrender, the Ustaše militia included 25 battalions, all of around 22,500 men with Pavelić's personal guard of about 6,000 men. In late 1944, the militia consisted of about 76,000 officers and men. In March 1945, the Ustaša Defence Brigades were incorporated into the Croatian Armed Forces.

== Croatian Gendarmerie ==
The Croatian Gendarmerie was formed on 30 April 1941 as rural police under Major-General Milan Miesler. By September 1943, there were 18,000 men in seven regional regiments. These were divided into 23 companies (one per county plus one for Zagreb). The companies were subdivided into 142 district platoons, each with several posts. In early 1942, a three-battalion Combined Gendarmie Regiment, in July redesignated Petrinja Brigade, was established for anti-Partisan operations in Slavonia. Twelve of the independent Police Volunteer Battalions formed the Croatian Gendarmerie Division in 1945.

== History ==
=== Organization ===
==== Marching order at end of 1944 ====
- 1. Poglavnik Bodyguard Division
- 1. Croatian Assault Division
  - Commander: General Ante Moškov
  - Headquarters: Zagreb
- 2. Croatian Infantry Division
  - Commander: General Mirko Gregurić
  - Headquarters: Zagreb
- 3. Croatian Infantry Division
  - Commander: General Stjepan Mifek
  - Headquarters: Vinkovci
- 4. Croatian Infantry Division
  - Commander: General Antun Nardelli
  - Headquarters: Dvor na Uni
- 5. Croatian Assault Division
  - Commander: General Rafael Boban
  - Headquarters: Bjelovar
- 6. Croatian Infantry Division
  - Commander: General Vladimir Metikoš
  - Headquarters: Banja Luka
- 7. Croatian Mountain Division
  - Commander: General Stjepan Perčić
  - Headquarters: Nova Kapela, Batrina
- 8. Croatian Infantry Division
  - Commander: General Roman Domanik
  - Headquarters: Sarajevo
- 9. Croatian Mountain Division
  - Commander: General Božidar Zorn
  - Headquarters: Mostar
- 10. Croatian Infantry Division
  - Commander: General Ivan Tomašević
  - Headquarters: Bihać
- 11. Croatian Infantry Division
  - Commander: Colonel Juraj Rukavina
  - Headquarters: Gospić
- 12. Croatian Infantry Division
  - Commander: Colonel Slavko Cesarić
  - Headquarters: Brčko
- 13. Croatian Infantry Division
  - Commander: General Tomislav Rolf
  - Headquarters: Karlovac
- 14. Croatian Infantry Division
  - Commander: Colonel Jaroslav Šotola
  - Headquarters: Brod na Savi
- 15. Croatian Infantry Division
  - Commander: General Zorko Čudina
  - Headquarters: Doboj
- 16. Croatian Replacement Division
  - Commander: General Milivoj Durbešić
  - Headquarters: Zagreb
- 18. Croatian Infantry Division

== Fate of Commanders ==
=== Executed ===
- Ante Moškov
- Mirko Gregurić
- Stjepan Mifek
- Antun Nardelli
- Vladimir Metikoš
- Roman Domanik
- Božidar Zorn
- Ivan Tomašević
- Juraj Rukavina
- Zorko Čudina
- Mijo Škoro

=== Unclear ===
- Rafael Boban
- Jaroslav Šotola
- Milivoj Durbešić

=== Emigrated ===
- Stjepan Peričić
- Slavko Cesarić

=== Committed suicide ===
- Tomislav Rolf

== Ranks and insignia ==
=== Commissioned officer ranks ===
The rank insignia of commissioned officers.

Rank group	General / flag officers			Senior officers			Junior officers
Croatian Armed Forces (1944-1945)
Croatian Armed Forces (1944-1945)	General pukovnik	General poručnik	General	Pukovnik	Podpukovnik	Bojnik	Nadsatnik	Satnik	Natporučnik	Poručnik	Zastavnik

=== Other ranks ===
The rank insignia of non-commissioned officers and enlisted personnel.

Rank group	Senior NCOs				Junior NCOs		Enlisted
Croatian Armed Forces (1944-1945)
Croatian Armed Forces (1944-1945)	Časnički namjesnik	Stožerni stražnik	Stražnik	Vodnik	Rojnik	Dorojnik	Strielac	Vojnik

== Bibliography ==
- Dizdar, Zdravko; Grčić, Marko; Ravlić, Slaven; Stuparić, Darko (1997). Tko je tko u NDH: Hrvatska 1941.-1945 (in Croatian). Minerva. ISBN 953-6377-03-9.
- Shaw, Les (1973). Trial by slander; a background to the Independent State of Croatia, and an account of the Anti-Croatian Campaign in Australia. Canberra: Harp Books. ISBN 0-909432-00-7.
- Thomas, Nigel (1983). Partisan warfare 1941-45. Osprey. ISBN 0-85045-513-8.
- Thomas, Nigel (1995). Axis forces in Yugoslavia, 1941-5. London: Osprey. ISBN 1-85532-473-3.
- Tomasevich, Jozo (2001). War and Revolution in Yugoslavia, 1941-1945: Occupation and Collaboration. Vol. 2. San Francisco: Stanford University Press. ISBN 0-8047-3615-4.
- Zaloga, Steve (2013). Tanks of Hitler's eastern allies 1941-45. Oxford. ISBN 978-1-78096-022-7.
