= Croatian Home Guard (World War II) =

- Hrvatsko domobranstvo
- Croatian Trefoil
- Active: 1941–1944
- Country: Croatia
- Allegiance: Independent State of Croatia
- Branch: Army; Air Force; Navy; Gendarmerie
- Size: 143,000 (1943); 70,000 (1944)
- Colors: Red, white and black
- Engagements: World War II in Yugoslavia

Commanders
- Commander-in-chief: Ante Pavelić
- Minister of Armed Forces: Slavko Kvaternik
- Notable commanders: Slavko Kvaternik; Viktor Pavičić; Vladimir Laxa; Fedor Dragojlov; Slavko Štancer; Ante Vokić

The Croatian Home Guard (Croatian: Hrvatsko domobranstvo) was the land army part of the armed forces of the Independent State of Croatia, a puppet entity that occupied the territory of the Kingdom of Yugoslavia which existed during World War II.

== Formation ==
The Croatian Home Guard was founded in April 1941, a few days after the founding of the Independent State of Croatia (NDH) itself, following the collapse of the Kingdom of Yugoslavia. It was done with the authorisation of German occupation authorities. The task of the new Croatian armed forces was to defend the new state against both foreign and domestic enemies.

Its name was taken from the old Royal Croatian Home Guard – the Croatian section of the Royal Hungarian Landwehr component of the Austro-Hungarian Army.

== Organization ==
Domobran recruits taking oath

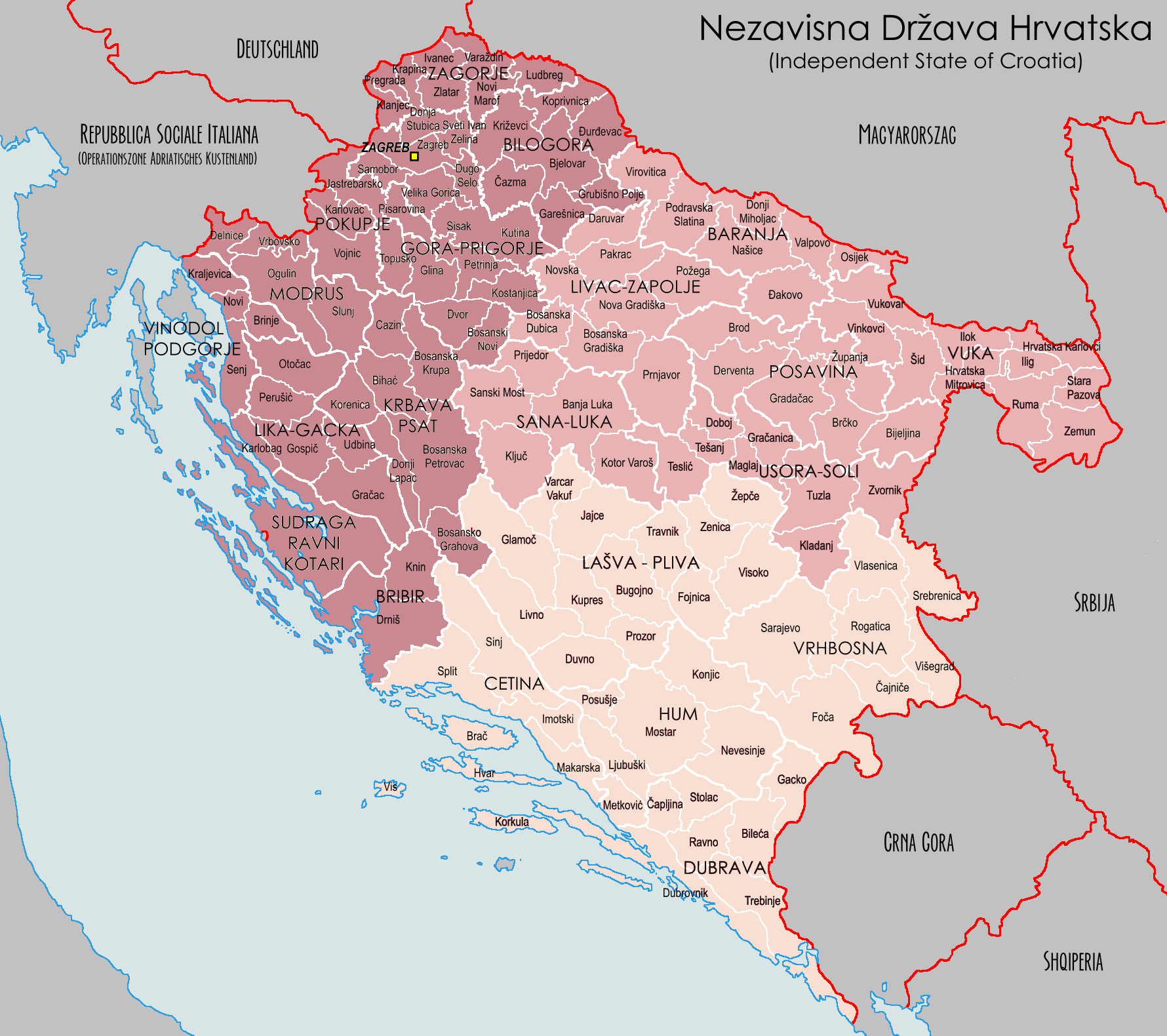
Croatian Home Guard Corps divisions

The Croatian Home Guard was originally limited to 16 infantry battalions and two cavalry squadrons – 16,000 men in total. The original 16 battalions were soon enlarged to 15 infantry regiments of two battalions each between May and June 1941, organised into five divisional commands, some 55,000 men. Support units included 35 former Yugoslav light tanks returned by Italy, four engineer battalions, 10 artillery battalions (equipped with captured Royal Yugoslav Army 105mm weapons of Czech origin), a cavalry regiment in Zagreb and an independent cavalry battalion at Sarajevo. Two independent motorized infantry battalions were based at Zagreb and Sarajevo respectively.

The fledgling Army crushed the revolt by Serbs in eastern Herzegovina in June, and fought in July in eastern and western Bosnia. They fought in eastern Herzegovina again, when Croatian-Dalmatian and Slavonian battalions reinforced local units. By the end of 1941, the NDH military forces consisted of 85,000 home guard and the national police force of about 6,000.

In January 1942, it forced the Partisans in eastern Bosnia back into Montenegro, but could not prevent their subsequent advance into western Bosnia. Clearly conventional infantry divisions were too cumbersome, and so, in September 1942, four specially designed mountain brigades (1st to 4th) were formed; each had two regiments totalling four 1,000-man battalions, mounted and machine gun companies, a two-gun artillery group, 16 light and 16 heavy machine guns, and six mortars. Two volunteer regiments, and a mobile Gendarmerie Brigade were also established; but, by November 1942, the partisans had occupied northern Bosnia, and the Army could only hold main towns and communications routes, abandoning the countryside.

During 1943, four Jäger Brigades (5th to 8th) were set up, each with four 500-man battalions in two regiments and an artillery group, equipped for hilly terrain. The Home Guard reached its maximum size at the end of 1943, when it had 130,000 men.

By 1944, the Croatian Army had 90,000 men, though only 20,000 were front-line combat troops, organised in three mountain, four Jager and eight static garrison brigades, and the 1st Recruit Training Division.

The Croatian Home Guard also included an air force, the Air Force of the Independent State of Croatia (Zrakoplovstvo Nezavisne Države Hrvatske, or ZNDH), the backbone of which was provided by 500 former Royal Yugoslav Air Force officers and 1,600 NCOs with 125 aircraft. By 1943, the ZNDH was 9,775 strong and equipped with 295 aircraft.

The small Navy of the Independent State of Croatia (Ratna Mornarica Nezavisne Države Hrvatske, or RMNDH) was limited by a special treaty with Fascist Italy. The Navy comprised a few riverine craft and, from 1943, coastal patrol boats. After the Armistice of Cassibile, the Croatian Navy was expanded, but the loss of an ally further weakened the Croatian state.

=== Units ===
- 1st Infantry Division

=== Command structure ===
The Home Guard was under the command of the Ministry of the Croatian Home Guard, in 1943 renamed to the Ministry of the Armed Forces (MINORS). The ministers were:

No.	Portrait	Minister of the Croatian Home Guard	Took office	Left office	Time in office
1	Slavko Kvaternik	Slavko Kvaternik (1878–1947)	10 April 1941	4 January 1943	1 year, 269 days
2	Ante Pavelić	Ante Pavelić (1889–1959)	4 January 1943	2 September 1943	241 days
3	Miroslav Navratil	Miroslav Navratil (1893–1947)	2 September 1943	29 January 1944	149 days
4	Ante Vokić	Ante Vokić (1909–1945)	29 January 1944	30 August 1944	214 days
5	Nikola Steinfl	Nikola Steinfl (1889–1945)	30 August 1944	8 May 1945	251 days

The Home Guard also had its General Staff. Chiefs of the General Staff included:

No.	Portrait	Chief of the General Staff	Took office	Left office	Time in office
1	Vladimir Laxa	General; Vladimir Laxa (1870–1945)	June 1941	August 1942	1 year, 2 months
2	Ivan Prpić	General; Ivan Prpić (1887–1967)	1942	1943	0–1 years
3	Fedor Dragojlov	General; Fedor Dragojlov (1881–1961)	1943	1944	0–1 years

== Weaknesses ==
Despite being the best-armed and having the best logistics and infrastructure of all the domestic military formations in the World War II Balkans, the Croatian Home Guard failed to become an efficient fighting force for a variety of reasons.

The most immediate reason was the lack of professional officers. Although initially significant numbers of ethnic Croat officers from the old Yugoslav army joined the Croatian Home Guard, most not entirely voluntarily, they were mistrusted by the new Ustaše puppet regime. Instead, the higher ranks were filled by presumably more reliable former Austro-Hungarian officers. Those men were older, retired and generally had little knowledge of modern warfare. NDH authorities tried to remedy this by forming officer schools and having junior staff trained in Italy and Germany, but effects of this policy came too late to affect the outcome of the war.

The other, more practical, reason was the rivalry between the Croatian Home Guard and the Ustaše Militia (Croatian: Ustaška vojnica), the less numerous but yet more reliable paramilitary formation. Those two formations never properly integrated their activities and the Militia was gradually taking more and more dwindling resources from the Home Guard.

Third and, arguably, most important reason, the gradual decline in support for the Ustaše regime among ethnic Croats, first fuelled by the abandonment of Dalmatia to Italy, then by the prospect of Home Guard troops being used by the Germans as cannon fodder on the Eastern Front – a repeat of the same traumatic experience from the First World War. This process intensified while the prospect of the Axis powers, and NDH with them, losing the war was getting more certain. Domobrani dissention, over the sadistic policies of the Ustaše, led to the outright persecution, deportation, and murder of Home Guard soldiers within the Jasenovac concentration camp system.

== Defections ==
As early as 1941, the Croatian Home Guards was being infiltrated by resistance groups. Yugoslav Partisans, who were based on non-sectarian ideology and had Croatian statehood as part of their pretext, were more successful in making inroads into the Home Guard than Serb-dominated Chetniks. A year later, this manifested in Croatian Partisan commanders referring to the Home Guard as their "supply depot", due to its personnel being a reliable source of arms, ammunition, general supplies, and intelligence.

== The final stages ==
Following the capitulation of Italy in September 1943 and the first aid shipments from the Western Allies, the military situation in Yugoslavia began to even more dramatically shift in favour of the Partisans. By mid-1944, many Home Guard personnel and units began to openly side with Partisans, leading to some instances of mass defections that included battalion-size formations as well as some ZNDH aircraft. By November 1944 the defections and desertions, as well as the creaming off of troops to the Ustashe Brigades or the 369th, 373rd, and 392nd so-called legionnaire divisions (Wehrmacht infantry divisions with Croatian troops under a German officer cadre) reduced the size of the Croatian Home Guard to 70,000 men, down from its peak at 130,000 in 1943.

== Merger into the Croatian Armed Forces ==
The NDH government, under heavy German pressure, reacted by formally integrating Croatian Home Guard and Ustasha Militia. New and more reliable officers were appointed, and draconian measures were introduced to increase discipline and prevent further defections. As a result, by May 1945, the NDH armed forces in total numbered 200,000 men.

The army of the Independent State of Croatia was organized in November 1944 to combine the units of the Ustaše and Croatian Home Guard into 18 divisions, comprising 13 infantry, two mountain, two assault and one replacement Croatian divisions, each with its own organic artillery and other support units. There were also several armoured units, equipped in late 1944 with 20 Pz IIIN and 15 Pz IVF and H medium tanks. From early 1945, the Croatian divisions were allocated to various German corps and by March 1945 were holding the Southern Front. Securing the rear areas were some 32,000 men of the Croatian Gendarmerie (Hrvatsko Oruznistvo), organised into five police volunteer regiments plus 15 independent battalions, equipped with standard light infantry weapons, including mortars.

The Air Force of the Independent State of Croatia and the units of the Croatian Air Force Legion (Hrvatska Zrakoplovna Legija, or HZL), returned from service on the Eastern Front provided some level of air support (attack, fighter and transport) right up until May 1945, encountering and sometimes defeating opposing aircraft from the British Royal Air Force, United States Army Air Force and the Soviet Air Force. Although 1944 had been a catastrophic year for the ZNDH, with aircraft losses amounting to 234, primarily on the ground, it entered 1945 with 196 planes. Further deliveries of new aircraft from Germany continued in the early months of 1945 to replace losses. April 1945 saw the final deliveries of up-to-date German Messerschmitt Bf 109G and K fighter aircraft and the ZNDH still had 176 aircraft on its strength in April 1945.

By the end of March, 1945, it was obvious to the Croatian army command that, although the front remained intact, they would eventually be defeated by sheer lack of ammunition. For this reason, the decision was made to retreat into Austria, in order to surrender to the British forces advancing north from Italy.

In May 1945, following the final Partisan offensive and collapse of the NDH, remaining Home Guard units joined other Axis forces and civilian refugees in the last desperate attempt to seek shelter among Western Allies. This resulted in many Home Guards becoming victims of the Bleiburg repatriations during which the victorious Partisans showed little mercy or even tendency to treat captured Home Guards separately from captured Ustashas. Those Home Guards who survived the ordeal, as well as members of their families, were mostly treated as second-class citizens in Tito's Yugoslavia, although there were some exceptions, most notably with the legendary sportscaster Mladen Delić. In 1945 the Partisans also destroyed the central Home Guard cemetery in Zagreb's Mirogoj Cemetery.

== Uniforms and rank insignia ==
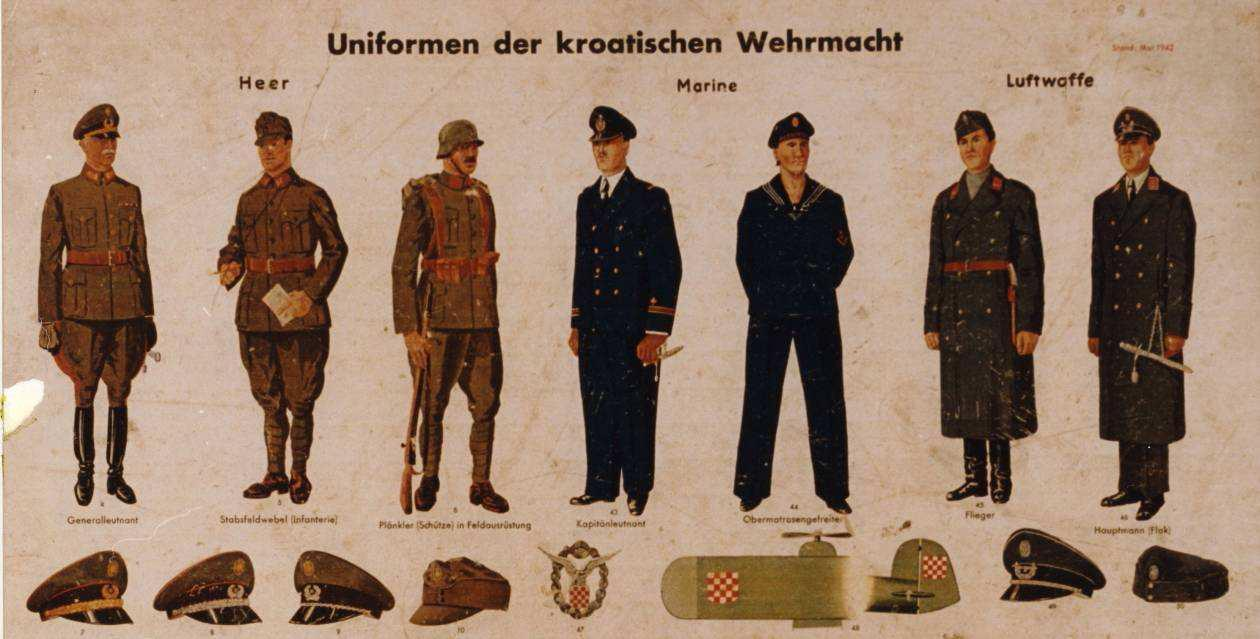
Uniforms of Croatian Home Guard. From left to right: Army proper, Navy, Air Force.

Ranks - Army proper

Collar Insignia	Rank	Translation
	Vojskovođa	Field Marshal
	General Pješaštva; General Topništva; General Konjaništva	Infantry General; Artillery General; Cavalry General
	Podmaršal	Lieutenant General
	General	Major General
	Pukovnik	Colonel
	Podpukovnik	Lieutenant Colonel
	Bojnik	Major
	Nadsatnik	Senior Captain
	Satnik	Captain
	Natporučnik	Lieutenant
	Poručnik	Second Lieutenant
	Zastavnik	Warrant Officer 1
	Časnički namjesnik	Warrant Officer 2
	Stožerni Narednik	Staff Sergeant
	Narednik	Sergeant
	Vodnik	Lance Sergeant
	Razvodnik	Corporal
	Desetnik	Lance Corporal
	Domobran	Home Guardsman (Private)
Source: Uniforminsignia.org

== Personnel ==
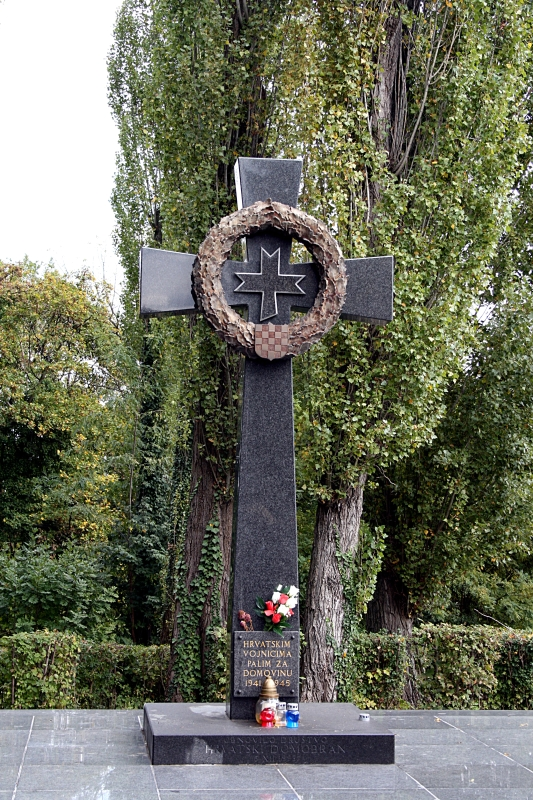
Croatian Home Guard memorial in Mirogoj cemetery

- Fedor Dragojlov – Colonel-General and Chief-of-Staff
- Mihajlo Lukić – General
- Franjo Šimić – Colonel
- Mato Dukovac – Ace pilot

=== List of generals ===
Killed in action

- Salko Alikadić (Kladanj, 18 March 1896 – Doboj, 16 November 1941)
- Eduard Bona Bunić (Ogulin, 14 March 1894 – Travnik, 22 October 1944)

Died of natural causes during World War II

- Kosta Bader (Zemun, 25 July 1874 – Zagreb, 13 March 1944)
- Pero Blašković (Karlovac, 25 June 1883 – Zagreb, 3 April 1945)

Executed in Yugoslavia

- Junuz Ajanović (Žepče, 5 October 1890 – Zagreb, July 1945)
- Vilko Begić (Čazma, January 20, 1874 – 1946)
- Oton Čuš (Garešnica, 11 February 1901 – Zagreb, 31 January 1949)
- Stjepan Doležil (Gospić, 2 August 1888 – Zagreb, 15 July 1945)
- Julije Fritz (Tenja, 4 August 1900 – Belgrade 1945)
- Mirko Gregorić (Glina, 4 May 1897 – Belgrade, 24 September 1945)
- Đuro Gruić (Srijemska Mitrovica, 6 December 1887 – Belgrade, 24 September 1945)
- August Gustović (Celovec, 5 February 1889 – Belgrade, June 1945)
- Vladimir Laxa
- Josip Solc (Zagreb, 30 January 1898 - Belgrade, 24 September 1945)

Died in Yugoslav prisons

- Milan Desović (Pljevlja, 24 April 1895 – 1960)
- Franjo Dolački (Sveti Ivan Žabno, 28 January 1884 – Stara Gradiška, 3 December 1950)
- Slavko Stanzer

Fate unknown

- Ćiril Danda (Sarajevo, 19 April 1893 – ?)
- Roman Domanik (Sarajevo, 17 May 1891 – ?)
- Stjepan Gaščić (Pisarovina, 8 December 1898 – ?)
- Stjepan Grlić (Zagreb, 27 July 1894 – ?)

Lived in emigration

- Rafael Boban (Grude, 22 December 1907 – ?)
- Ivan Brozović (Križevci, 6 February 1891 – Austria, ?)
- Slavko Cesarić (Jastrebarsko, 31 July 1897 – Buenos Aires, ?)
- Matija Čanić (Gospić, 1901 – Buenos Aires, 3 May 1964)
- Đuro Dragičević (Kalesija, 7 November 1890 – Vienna, 28 July 1980)
- Fedor Dragojlov (Pančevo, 21 August 1881 – Buenos Aires, 8 December 1961)

== Home Guard in modern Croatia ==
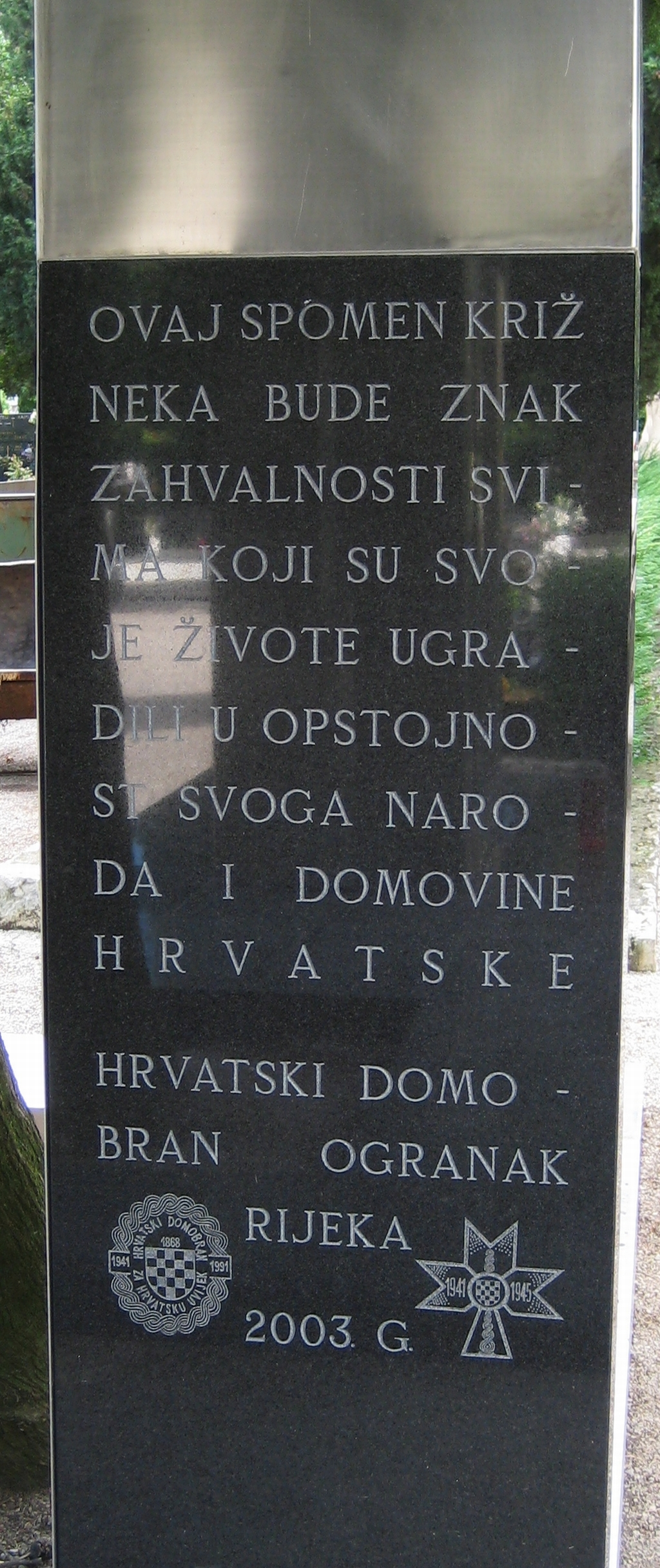
Memorial unveiled in Trsat in 2003

As Croatia gained independence during the Yugoslav wars, the new government under the presidency of Franjo Tuđman began the process of re-building the historical Home Guards.

The rehabilitation of Home Guards is only reflected in surviving Home Guards receiving pensions and other state benefits. Home Guards disabled during the war received state recognition in 1992 equivalent to Partisan veterans. The Home Guard has also received recognition from the government in helping to establish the democratic Republic of Croatia.

The local-based Croatian Army regiments were named the Home Guard Regiments (Domobranska pukovnija). They were first created on 24 December 1991, during the Croatian War of Independence, and ceased to exist in a 2003 reorganization.

== See also ==
- Military history of Croatia
