= 503rd Brigade (ARBiH) =

503rd Glorious Mountain Brigade of ARBIH
- "503. Slavna brdska brigada"
- Active: 19 July 1992-1995
- Country: Bosnia and Herzegovina
- Branch: Army of the Republic of Bosnia and Herzegovina
- Type: Infantry
- Garrison/HQ: Cazin
- Engagements: Bosnian War; Siege of Bihać (1992-95); Operation Grmeč; Intra-Bosnian Muslim War; Operation Sana

Commanders
- Notable commanders: Muhamed Hamdo Delalić Esad Begić Kasim Ljubijankić - Čaruga

The 503rd Glorious Mountain Brigade (Bosnian: 503. slavna brdska brigada) was a military brigade during the Bosnian War which operated in the Bihać pocket and was part of the 5th Corps. It was formed on the August 17, 1992 in Cazin as the First Cazin infantry Brigade. The brigade was the strongest in the whole Cazin municipality.

== History ==
On the Grmusi-Srbljani plateau the brigade often fought fierce battles against the Army of Republika Srpska. This plateau was very important for the Bihać pocket, if it ever feel to Serb hands that would have put Bihać in a dangerous position, because the communication Bihać-Cazin-Bosanska Krupa would have been completely cut off and the only hydroelectric power plant could have not been used. This never happened because of the decisive fighting of the 503rd and 504th brigade on the beginning of the war. After Fikret Abdić proclaimed the Autonomous Province of Western Bosnia a part of the 503rd brigade in Cazin changed sides and sided with the rebel forces. With the command of the General Staff of the Army of Republic Bosnia and Herzegovina the name of the brigade got changed from First Cazin infantry Brigade to 503rd Mountain Brigade. On June 29, 1995, the brigade got awarded with title Famous (Slavna) by the decision of the Republic of Bosnia and Herzegovina presidency.

=== Ključ-Sana Unit ===
The Ključ-Sana unit of the brigade (part of third battalion) led by Amir Avdić had about two 120 men companies of soldiers, from who 4 were women. After the massacres which the Serb forces carried out in Sanski Most and Ključ, with the help of UNPROFOR the base of 146 men of this unit managed to get to the free territory in Bihać thanks to capturing the command of 6. Sana brigade VRS in Galaja resistance. Releasing them was done for exchange to transport the unit safely to free territory of Bihać. It is known as a first major win of 5th Corps. Later other refugees from Ključ, Sanski Most, Bos. Petrovac, Prijedor, Banja Luka, middle Bosnia, who came on foot through occupied territory joined the unit. The unit joined the 503rd Brigade, as part of third battalion together with company of Grmuša-Srbljani platoe settlers. It made a great contribution to the defense of the territory of the Bihać pocket. After the start of first autonomy Ključ-Sana unit on Amir Avdić's request and by recognition of the ARBiH high command and president Alija Izetbegović separated to create, elite light shock brigade named 1st Bosnian Liberation brigade (later 510th Bosnian Liberation Brigade) on 25. 10. 1993. Base of the brigade were the members of Ključ-Sana unit, Grmuša-Srbljani company and volunteers from other brigades of 5th Corps, it was the most mixed unit of the whole 5th Corps since it had members from almost every settlement in Bosanska Krajina region. Brigadier Amir Avdić became the brigade commander (youngest commander of 5th Corps, at only 25 years old), his deputy was major Isak Fazlić (who was also one of the youngest commanders in 5th Corps). Later after the formation process brigade consisted of five 120 men companies, one Reconnaissance-Sabotage Company nicknamed "Noćne Ptice" (Night Birds), logistics company, MP platoon, two Fire support squads and the brigade command.

=== Battle for Grabez Plateau, 31 August - 6 September 1994 ===
The 503rd brigade launched a counterattack on 6 September and erased VRS gains and even seized some previously Serb-held ground.

== Organization ==
On the day of the formation the brigade had: 79 officers, 112 non-commissioned officers, 1118 soldiers or 1309 all together. With the joinment of the Brekovica detachment, it had 1499 all together. The brigade consisted of 3 infantry battalions, 1 support battalion and 1 anti-tank unit, 1 anti-air unit and 1 logistics unit which were:

- Detachment TO Cazin
- Detachment TO Brekovica
- Company TO Donja Koprivna, Pećigrad, Skokovi, Liskovac, Krivaja and Pjanići
- Kljuc-Sana Unit

The primary area of responsibility of the brigade extended from Alibegovića Kosa - Donji Brkići and to the Una river. Since the formation of the Autonomous Province of Western Bosnia the brigade also had an area of responsibility towards that front.

== Command ==
On the day of the formation of the brigade, it was structured like this:

- Commander: Muhamed Hamdo Delalić
- Deputy Commander: Omer Hajrulahović
- Assistant for Morale: Kasim Pandžić
- Assistant for Security: Sead Kazaferovic
- Assistant for Logistics: Enes Beširević
- Assistant for filling and personal affairs: Senad Žunić

The commander Muhamed Hamdo Delalić stayed in that position until the end of the Bosnian war.

== Losses and decorations ==
The 503rd Brigade had 282 dead, 2183 wounded and 181 missing / captured fighters and elders from 1992 to 1995. 28 are "Zlatni Ljiljani" – recipients of the Order of the Golden Lily.
