= Alija Omanović =

Alija "Ale" Omanović was a Bosnian Muslim Ustaše official in the Independent State of Croatia (NDH), an Axis puppet state during World War II, who carried out massacres and forced conversions to Islam of Serbs in Cazin and surrounding villages.

== Before World War II ==
Before the Axis invasion of Yugoslavia in April 1941 and the subsequent creation of the Independent State of Croatia (Croatian: Nezavisna Država Hrvatska), NDH), Omanović belonged to the right-wing faction of the Croatian Peasant Party (Croatian: Hrvatska seljačka stranka, HSS). He headed the local HSS branch and was a commissioner of Hrvatski radiša (Croatian Worker) and Seljačka sloga (Peasants United) in Cazin. Omanović also maintained contact with Slavko Kvaternik and the Ustaše circles in Zagreb, at a time when this was a banned terrorist organisation. Until 1929, Omanović was also a member of the Yugoslav Muslim Organization, a political party gathering Yugoslav Muslims before its abolishment with the introduction of the 6 January Dictatorship of King Alexander I of Yugoslavia.

== Independent State of Croatia ==
From the day the NDH was created on 10 April 1941, and the Ustaše came to power, notable citizens of several towns in Bosanska Krajina: Sanski Most, Bihać and Cazin organised an assembly to greet the advancing German troops. Such an assembly was organised in Cazin on 11 April 1941, where Omanović gave opening words and invited the citizens of Cazin to welcome the Germans with Croatian flags.

In the NDH, Omanović became an logornik (commander) in Cazin as part of the Ustaše. Himzo Hadžić was appointed his deputy. On 6 June 1941, Omanović was appointed a deputy to the commissioner (Croatian: stožernik) of the districts of Sana–Luka and Krbava–Psat Viktor Gutić. Gutić was succeeded as a commissioner by Mirko Beljan in mid-September 1941.

=== Persecution of Serbs ===
During the existence of the NDH, Omanović participated in the genocide of Serbs.

On 28 and 31 July 1941, he deceitfully invited Serb men aged 15–70 from Vrelo, Gradina and Osredak for work in Germany. Around a hundred men responded to his call, only to be imprisoned in Cazin. Omanović visited them together with Branko Vojinović from Osredak, a Serb who had converted to Islam and became an Ustaša. Omanović conditioned their release with conversion to Islam or Catholicism. It was promised that those who converted to Islam would retain their estate and receive back all that was taken from them and more, while those who would choose Catholicism would be moved to Ćorkovača. Men from Gradina and Osredak, advised by Vojinović, decided to convert to Islam, and men from Vrelo converted to Catholicism. A Catholic parish priest arrived in Vrelo a month later and was accompanied by thirty Home Guards. These actually protected the local Serbs from the Muslim Ustaše until 1943, when they all joined the Yugoslav Partisans.

Unsatisfied with the number of the imprisoned Serbs, Grand Prefect Ljubomir Kvaternik ordered the massacre of the Serbs who refused to comply. Omanović and his men had already found adequate locations for the disposal of bodies in Macini Dolovi in Gnjilavac, near a hospital and gymnasium in Cazin, and at Čongur hill. On 2 August, Omanović, with the help of Ustaše from Bihać, Bužim, Krupa and Glina, initiated a campaign against the remaining Serbs in Cazin and its surrounding villages, including: Osredak, Selišta, Krndija, Vrelo, Gradina, Pištaline, Perna, Podgomila, Miostrah, Crnaja, Memić Brdo, Podgredina. The Ustaše received support from Muslim civilians, including women and children, from the nearby villages, armed with axes, hoes, scythes and other blunt instruments. The Serbs were mainly killed on the spot, with some fleeing and resisting. Omanović led the killings, while Hadžić was the main organiser. Kvaternik's confidante Evner Kapetanović personally participated in the massacre. The local imam, Bećir Borić, continued the massacres of the remaining Serbs for several days.

After the massacre, the Ustaše tried to persuade Serbs to return to their villages. To convince them, Omanović visited Serb villages with the Serbs who had recently converted to Islam, and emphasised the necessity of converting to Islam or Catholicism. Forty-six Serbs from Tržačka Raštela, mostly women and children, answered the call to return to their homes and converted to Catholicism, but were massacred by Omanović's men on 22 September 1941.

== Fate ==
On 30 October 1941, a mobile punitive court of the NDH led a proceeding against Omanović, Borić and others for the massacre in Tržačka Raštela and other villages. Borić was sentenced to death, while the proceeding against Omanović was separated, since he couldn't be located. During the proceedings, Borić and other defendants blamed Omanović, claiming that he ordered the cleansing of the area. They also denied that they massacred the Serbs, claiming that they were killed in a fight instead. The court rejected their defence. The court characterised Omanović as an organiser of the massacre, and Borić as an "intellectual initiator".
