= Koprivna =

Koprivna may refer to one of the following villages:

== Bosnia and Herzegovina ==
- Koprivna (Modriča), in Bosnia and Herzegovina
- Koprivna (Sanski Most), in Bosnia and Herzegovina
- Donja Koprivna, in Bosnia and Herzegovina
- Gornja Koprivna, in Bosnia and Herzegovina
- Koprivna (Zenica), in Bosnia and Herzegovina

== Croatia ==
- Koprivna, Osijek-Baranja County, a village near Šodolovci, Croatia
- Koprivna, Požega-Slavonia County, a village near Brestovac, Croatia

== Czech Republic ==
- Kopřivná, a municipality and village in the Czech Republic
- Kopřivná (mountain), a mountain in the Hrubý Jeseník mountain range in the Czech Republic

== Serbia ==
- Koprivna (Prijepolje), in Serbia

== Slovenia ==
- Koprivna, Črna na Koroškem, in Slovenia
