= Cazin rebellion =

1950 uprising in Bosanska Krajina, Yugoslavia

- Part of the Cold War
- Date: 5–6 May 1950
- Location: Cazin, Velika Kladuša and Slunj, FPR Yugoslavia
- Caused by: Drought, forced collectivization
- Result: Uprising suppressed

Parties
| Civilians and rebels | Yugoslavia: Yugoslav People's Army |

Lead figures
| Ale Čović (surrendered) (executed); Milan Božić (POW) (executed) | Unknown |

Casualties
- Deaths: 29–32
- Arrested: 714

The Cazin rebellion (Serbo-Croatian: Cazinska buna, Цазинска буна) was an armed anti-state rebellion of peasants that occurred in May 1950 in the towns of Cazin and Velika Kladuša in the Bosanska Krajina region, as well as Slunj in Croatia, at that time part of Communist Yugoslavia. The peasants revolted against the forced collectivization and collective farms set up by the Yugoslav government following a drought in 1949, after which they had been punished due to their inability to meet the quotas. The ringleaders were persecuted and some killed, including many innocent civilians.

== Etymology ==
The rebellion is variously called Cazin rebellion, Cazin uprising, Cazin revolt, and 1950 peasants' revolt.

== Background ==
Peasants made up three-quarters of Yugoslavia's population until the 1960s. The countryside had contributed the majority of the recruits to Yugoslav Partisans, Ustaše and Chetniks alike during World War II. They suffered much more than their counterparts in the cities. When the war ended and communist Yugoslavia was established, the new communist leadership forced peasants to produce enough food to satisfy the needs of the entire country and exports. This rule applied throughout the communist Balkans, and politicians were quick to curb independent political activity in the countryside.

Yugoslavia began collectivization and forcing the peasants to start collective farms as early as 1947, in an effort to appease its communist ally the Soviet Union, when Joseph Stalin accused Yugoslav leader Josip Broz Tito of deviating from Socialism in the direction of capitalism. Then, in June 1948, Yugoslavia was expelled from the Cominform. To disprove the claim of revisionism, the leadership in Belgrade decided instead to speed up collectivization, demonstrating that it was not Yugoslavia but the Soviet Union and its allies that had strayed from the path of Stalinism.

Agricultural production was down by more than half over pre-war figures. In the Bosnian city of Cazin, for example, there was far less livestock, and herds were exhausted, undernourished, ill. Despite its significant potential, Yugoslavia was unable to feed itself in the immediate postwar period. The state had to intervene to provide the necessary investment and incentives to stimulate production. It forced peasants to hand over their holdings to unwieldy agricultural conglomerates, the collective farms. Those who refused to join were subject to a harsh regime of requisition.

The number of collective farms rose in 1949 from 1,318 to almost 7,000. The Party increased the requisitions to unrealistic levels, often demanding more from peasants than they could produce in a year. Peasants unable to fulfill their quotas risked losing everything (the so-called 'total confiscation' regime). Failure could also result in a spell at a work camp, where they would join political prisoners and students on construction or mining projects. Some hoarded their produce and slaughtered their livestock rather than hand it over to inspectors. In the countryside, some communities began to go hungry. Many small protests occurred, but by 1950, others were considering more radical forms of resistance.

== Revolt ==
To further complicate matters, a drought in 1949 had led to a sharp drop in production and by January 1950, the Cazin district inspectors had collected 800,000 kilos less than their annual quota. The figures were worse for cattle and swine. In response, the communists mounted a renewed confiscation to drive. This was too much for Milan Božić, a Serb from the village Crnaja, and his friend, Mile Devrnja, a Serb who lived over the Korana river in the Slunj district of Croatia. They met secretly at Božić's home in mid-March to lay down groundwork for an armed rebellion against the Yugoslav state. For this to have any prospect of success in Cazin, the Serbs would have to persuade the Bosniak peasantry to join in. Over the next six weeks, the peasant army attracted hundreds of recruits from their friends and extended families in both Cazin and the neighboring Croat districts. Some of the leaders were so-called prvoborci (founding fighters or, more literally, first fighters) of the Partisans who recognized the need to instill discipline and organization.

Božić, a member of the Communist Party of Yugoslavia, set out from his hamlet in northwestern Bosnia to visit his old comrade, Ale Čović, a Bosniak who lived in the Liskovac village 5 kilometers away. The two had met during World War II, fighting in the same Yugoslav Partisan unit around Bihać. Both men were peasant farmers. Six years after Tito had taken power in Yugoslavia, Božić called on his old comrade, Čović, to persuade him to take up arms once more.

Rebel leaders Milan Božić and Mile Devrnja, also promised the citizens that the Kingdom of Yugoslavia would be restored under King Peter II and that compulsory deliveries of grains and produce, collective farms, and taxes would all be abolished.

On Saint George's Day, 6 May 1950, which in Balkan peasant tradition signalled the beginning of the annual hajduk (outlaw) actions against the Ottomans, about 720 Bosnian peasants, predominately of Bosniak ethnicity, staged anti-government riots. The rebels attempted to seize the city of Cazin and also marched to Bihać and Velika Kladuša. They burned the archives of local authorities, pillaged food depots, and cut telephone wires. In another version of the mutiny, Cominformists roused the army units in Cazin with the intention of using the tank units to extend the rebellion in the direction of Banja Luka, the administrative center of this part of Bosnia, and nearby Mount Kozara, a Partisan base area during the war. The rebellion was quickly subdued and eight participants were killed in the mop-up action. The authorities arrested 714 persons; 288 of them were tried by a military tribunal, which meted out stiff punishments, including 17 death sentences. The 426 other participants were given administrative punishments. About 777 members of 115 families were sentenced to a "collective punishment of eviction" and relocated to the town Srbac in northern Bosnia. The eviction was an unheard-of penalty for the entire rule of Communist Yugoslavia. Out of the 720 participants, 15 were ethnic Serbs and the rest were Muslims. The "collective relocation" of nearly 800 Bosniaks from a town where the population consisted of 90% Bosniaks, to a town with a population of over 90% Serbs, was seen as political punishment by many.

During the same period, in coordination with the developments in the Cazin area, a group of Serbs from the neighboring Kordun, in Croatia, attacked and held Lađevac and Rakovica. They were dispersed and pursued for a month over the highlands of the Kapela Range.

Twenty-five of the rebels were killed as a result of the government's violent reaction to the uprising. Twelve rebels were killed during the revolt in a skirmish with the Yugoslav People's Army (JNA) and local police. The Yugoslav government also issued 17 verdicts of death by firing squad which were carried out in November 1950. Prior to their execution, Ale Čović and Milan Božić were asked if they had any final wishes; they both had the same wish: to be buried in the same grave.

== Victims ==
A total of 25 people were killed as a result of the governments violent reaction to the uprising. At least twelve rebels were killed in a skirmish with the JNA and local police. The following eight have been identified as casualties: Agan Beganović, Arif Durmić, Hasan Čavić, Mahmut Beganović, Mehmed Mehuljić, Muso Kovačević, Šahin Seferagić, Selim Šarić.

The Yugoslav government also issued 17 verdicts of death by firing squad which were carried out in November 1950: Agan Ćoralić, Ale Čović, Dedo Čović, Đulaga Šumar, Hasan Kekić, Hasib Beganović, Husein Zekanović, Husein Kapić, Mehmed Tabaković, Milan Božić, Mile Miljković, Muharem Dervišević, Nezir Bajraktarević, Nikola Božić, Ramo Karajić, Smail Ajkić, Stojan Starčević.

== Aftermath ==
Ale Čović's widow, Bejza, later remembered in an interview: "Popular dissatisfaction with the requisitions was rising everywhere and more and more were hungry. My husband couldn't sleep at night for worry and he became ever more withdrawn... There had been a terrible drought that year and the shortages meant the cattle were weak and scrawny."

In 2008, 6 May was declared the Day of Remembrance of the Cazin Uprising Victims and two years later, RTV Cazin of the Una-Sana Canton produced a documentary film called Cazinska buna - neispričana priča (Cazin Revolt - The Untold Story.)

In late April 2009, the Islamic Community in Bosnia and Herzegovina rendered a decision to perform a joint funeral for victims of the uprising, whose remains had never been properly buried. The remains of the murdered civilians were buried on 11 May 2009, 59 years after the uprising.

Today not much is known about the uprising; even close family members of the individuals involved in this historical event do not know clearly what their grandparents and great-grandparents roles were in the revolt, why they were killed, whether they were on the side of good, bad, or just victims of ignorance. This is attributed to the fact that the revolt had been somewhat of a taboo subject for over four decades until the book "Cazinska buna: 1950" (Cazin Revolt: 1950), written by doctor and professor Vera Kržišnik-Bukić, was released in October 1991, as Yugoslavia fell apart. Until then few dared to speak about the event due to fear of prosecution for their involvement. The murders in 1950 were never officially investigated.

== See also ==
- Husino uprising
- 2014 unrest in Bosnia and Herzegovina
- Rebellions in Bosnia and Herzegovina

== Sources ==
- Paul F. Myers; Arthur A. Campbell (1954). The Population of Yugoslavia. U.S. Government Printing Office. p. 85. OCLC 4265204.
