= Muttnik (disambiguation) =

Muttnik may refer to:

- Laika (dog; 1954-1957; Russian: Лайка), the Soviet space dog aboard Sputnik 2, nicknamed by the 1950s American press as "Muttnik"
- Muttnik (mascot), the team mascot for the baseball team Mankato MoonDogs
- "Muttnik", a 1959 song by Count Basie off the album Basie One More Time

== See also ==
- Mutnik (Serbian: Мутник), Cazin, Bosnia and Herzegovina
- "Sputniks and Mutniks" (song), a 1982 song off the soundtrack for the film The Atomic Cafe
- Nagymutnok (Romanian: Mâtnicu Mare; formerly: Nagy-Mutnik, aka "Mutnik"), Constantin Daicoviciu, Caraș-Severin, Romania
