= Čohodari =

- Village
- Location within Bosnia and Herzegovina
- Coordinates: 44°55′53″N 15°59′16″E
- Country: Bosnia and Herzegovina
- Municipality: Cazin
- Entity: Federation of Bosnia and Herzegovina
- Time zone: UTC+1 (CET)
  - Summer (DST): UTC+2 (CEST)

Čohodari (Cyrillic: Чоходари) is a village in the municipality of Cazin, Bosnia and Herzegovina.
