= Bajrići (Cazin) =

- Village
- Location within Bosnia and Herzegovina
- Coordinates: 44.940569°N 16.044937°E
- Country: Bosnia and Herzegovina
- Entity: Federation of Bosnia and Herzegovina
- Canton: Una-Sana
- Municipality: Cazin

Area
  - Total: 0.94 sq mi (2.43 km^{2})

Population (2013)
  - Total: 391
  - Density: 417/sq mi (161/km^{2})
- Time zone: UTC+1 (CET)
  - Summer (DST): UTC+2 (CEST)

Bajrići is a village in the municipality of Cazin, Bosnia and Herzegovina. It is located just east of Bajrići, in Bihać municipality.

== Demographics ==
According to the 2013 census, its population was 391.

Ethnicity in 2013
Ethnicity	Number	Percentage
Bosniaks	387	99.0%
other/undeclared	4	1.0%
Total	391	100%
