= Pivnice =

Pivnice may refer to the following places:

- Pivnice (Bačka Palanka)
- Pivnice (Cazin)
