= Husino rebellion =

1920 strike in the Kingdom of Serbs, Croats and Slovenes

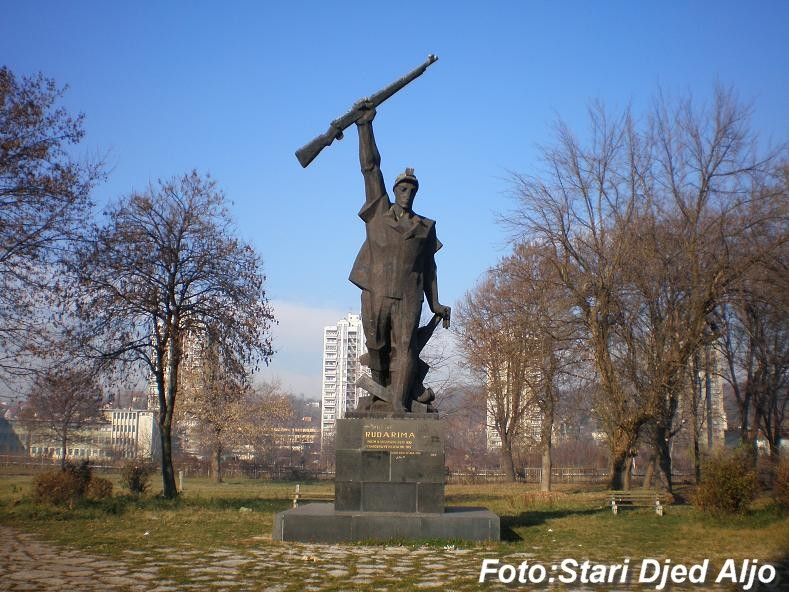
- Monument dedicated to the victims
- Date: 21–28 December 1920
- Location: Husino, Tuzla, Kingdom of Serbs, Croats and Slovenes
- Result: Government victory

Parties
Miners led by Juro Kerošević	Army of the Kingdom of Serbs, Croats and Slovenes

Number
7,000	two battalions, 69 gendarmerie

Casualties
- Deaths: 7
- Arrested: c. 400

The Husino rebellion (Serbo-Croatian: Husinska buna, Хусинска буна) was a short-lived miners strike and armed rebellion in the newly established Kingdom of Serbs, Croats and Slovenes. 7,000 miners from Tuzla, Breza and Zenica mines in central Bosnia, participated in the strike in the village of Husino near Tuzla. When the local government tried to force the miners back to work, they resisted with firearms and the uprising was eventually suppressed with great violence. Seven miners were killed and four hundred were arrested. The uprising was suppressed, but its memory was preserved as part of Tuzla's anti-authoritarian legacy. The rebellion has been called one of the most important historical events in Yugoslavia and has remained an example of class struggle against injustice and oppression.

== Event ==
A miners' strike began on 21 December 1920 in Husino when the miners requested a rise of wages of 30-45% to counter the galloping inflation which had paralyzed the economy of the Kingdom of Serbs, Croats and Slovenes (60% between August and December 1920). Even with threats in the event of refusal of the authorities, the miners began a general strike. This very badly accommodated by the authorities who took radical measures to counter it. On the night of 27–28 December 1920, they sent a troop of 19 gendarmerie and police officers, who were ordered to evacuate the houses of the strikers in order to capture them and to counterbalance them, to Husino, which was then regarded as general headquarter of the strike movement.

The main leaders of the strike were Jure Kerošević Guja, Osman Đulović Topčo, Mujo Đulović Mujko, Karlo Železnik, Ivan Brcun, Franjo Marić, Marko Fidler, Bozo Mrkić, Simo Topalović, Mijo Tomić.

The 7,000 miners, armed with simple stones and pickaxes, quickly decimated the gendarmes and police officers, which caused the anger of the authorities who sent two battalions of the army as well as heavy artillery and 50 gendarmes that same evening. Vis-à-vis the army, the miners had only one choice: to surrender and give up their requirements. The rebellion was choked in blood by the Yugoslav government and the miners and their families' homes were confiscated, women were raped, over 400 people were arrested and some were expatriated.

Thirteen months later, the revolt got an epilogue in a trial conducted in Tuzla in January–February 1922. The indictment charged the c. 350 miners, including the leader of the uprising, Juro Kerošević, who was originally sentenced to death by hanging for allegedly killing gendarmerie officers. However, under pressure from domestic and international publicity the penalty was commuted to 20 years in prison. 32 miners were sentenced to death and 10 other miners were penalized with prison time ranging from 1–15 months.

== Aftermath and legacy ==
The rebellion has been called one of the most important historical events in the former Yugoslavia and has remained an example of class struggle against injustice and oppression.

The steles of the victims installed in the municipal park of Husino testify still today to that dark time in the recent history of the village. A monument to memorialize the Husino miners (created by Ivan Sabolić) was erected in 1956, showing a miner dropping his pick for a rifle. In SFR Yugoslavia, 21 December was celebrated as Miners' Day throughout the country, because of the Husino Uprising.

During the Bosnian War (1992–95), a boot camp in Tuzla was named Husinska buna.

In February 2014, multiple Bosnian newspapers including Oslobođenje called the 2014 unrest in Bosnia and Herzegovina, the "new Husino Uprising".

== In popular culture ==
A folk song called Konjuh planinom (Konjuh Mountain) was inspired by the uprising in the Husino village. It was first sung by Pejo Marković, who was killed in 1944 during World War II. Televizija Sarajevo produced a television film about the Husino Uprising called Husinska buna (Husino Rebellion, 1980).

== See also ==
- Cazin rebellion
- Rebellions in Bosnia and Herzegovina

== Annotations ==
1. Usually called Husinska buna in Serbo-Croatian, the event has been referred to in English as "Husino rebellion", Husino Uprising, "Husino Revolt", Uprising of Husino Village, or the Husino Miner's Revolt.
