= Stijena =

Stijena may refer to:

- Stijena, Bosnia and Herzegovina, a village near Cazin
- Stijena, Montenegro, a village near Podgorica
