= Čizmići =

- Village
- Location within Bosnia and Herzegovina
- Country: Bosnia and Herzegovina
- Entity: Federation of Bosnia and Herzegovina
- Canton: Una-Sana
- Municipality: Cazin

Area
  - Total: 1.1 sq mi (2.9 km^{2})

Population (2013)
  - Total: 851
  - Density: 760/sq mi (290/km^{2})
- Time zone: UTC+1 (CET)
  - Summer (DST): UTC+2 (CEST)

Čizmići is a village in the municipality of Cazin, Bosnia and Herzegovina.

== Demographics ==
According to the 2013 census, its population was 851.

Ethnicity in 2013
Ethnicity	Number	Percentage
Bosniaks	842	98.9%
Croats	1	0.1%
other/undeclared	8	0.9%
Total	851	100%
