= Gornja Lučka =

- Village
- Location within Bosnia and Herzegovina
- Coordinates: 45°04′N 15°55′E
- Country: Bosnia and Herzegovina
- Entity: Federation of Bosnia and Herzegovina
- Canton: Una-Sana
- Municipality: Cazin

Area
  - Total: 2.09 sq mi (5.42 km^{2})

Population (2013)
  - Total: 876
  - Density: 419/sq mi (162/km^{2})
- Time zone: UTC+1 (CET)
  - Summer (DST): UTC+2 (CEST)

Gornja Lučka is a village in the municipality of Cazin, Bosnia and Herzegovina.

== Demographics ==
According to the 2013 census, its population was 876.

Ethnicity in 2013
Ethnicity	Number	Percentage
Bosniaks	744	84.9%
Croats	3	0.3%
other/undeclared	129	14.7%
Total	876	100%
