= Ostrožac na Uni =

Ostrožac na Uni Острожац на Уни
- Village
- Interactive map of Ostrožac na Uni
- Location within Bosnia and Herzegovina
- Coordinates: 44.8997486°N 15.936854°E
- Country: Bosnia and Herzegovina
- Entity: Federation of Bosnia and Herzegovina
- Canton: Una-Sana
- Municipality: Cazin

Area
  - Total: 0.13 sq mi (0.34 km^{2})

Population (2013)
  - Total: 100
  - Density: 760/sq mi (290/km^{2})
- Time zone: UTC+1 (CET)
  - Summer (DST): UTC+2 (CEST)

Ostrožac na Uni (Serbian Cyrillic: Острожац на Уни) is a village in the municipality of Cazin, Bosnia and Herzegovina.

== Demographics ==
According to the 2013 census, its population was 100.

Ethnicity in 2013
Ethnicity	Number	Percentage
Bosniaks	88	88.0%
Croats	6	6.0%
other/undeclared	6	6.0%
Total	100	100%
