= Donja Lučka =

- Village
- Location within Bosnia and Herzegovina
- Coordinates: 45°05′N 15°55′E
- Country: Bosnia and Herzegovina
- Entity: Federation of Bosnia and Herzegovina
- Canton: Una-Sana
- Municipality: Cazin

Area
  - Total: 1.15 sq mi (2.99 km^{2})

Population (2013)
  - Total: 546
  - Density: 473/sq mi (183/km^{2})
- Time zone: UTC+1 (CET)
  - Summer (DST): UTC+2 (CEST)

Donja Lučka is a village in the municipality of Cazin, Bosnia and Herzegovina.

== Demographics ==
According to the 2013 census, its population was 546.

Ethnicity in 2013
Ethnicity	Number	Percentage
Bosniaks	413	75.6%
Croats	6	1.1%
Serbs	1	0.2%
other/undeclared	126	23.1%
Total	546	100%
