= Donja Barska =

- Village
- Location within Bosnia and Herzegovina
- Coordinates: 45°00′00″N 15°51′32″E
- Country: Bosnia and Herzegovina
- Entity: Federation of Bosnia and Herzegovina
- Canton: Una-Sana
- Municipality: Cazin

Area
  - Total: 0.69 sq mi (1.79 km^{2})

Population (2013)
  - Total: 127
  - Density: 184/sq mi (70.9/km^{2})
- Time zone: UTC+1 (CET)
  - Summer (DST): UTC+2 (CEST)

Donja Barska is a village in the municipality of Cazin, Bosnia and Herzegovina.

== Demographics ==
According to the 2013 census, its population was 127.

Ethnicity in 2013
Ethnicity	Number	Percentage
Bosniaks	125	98.4%
other/undeclared	2	1.6%
Total	127	100%
