= Ostrožac Castle =

Castle located in Bosnia and Herzegovina

Coordinates: 44.904°N 15.937°E

- Ostrožac, Bosnia and Herzegovina
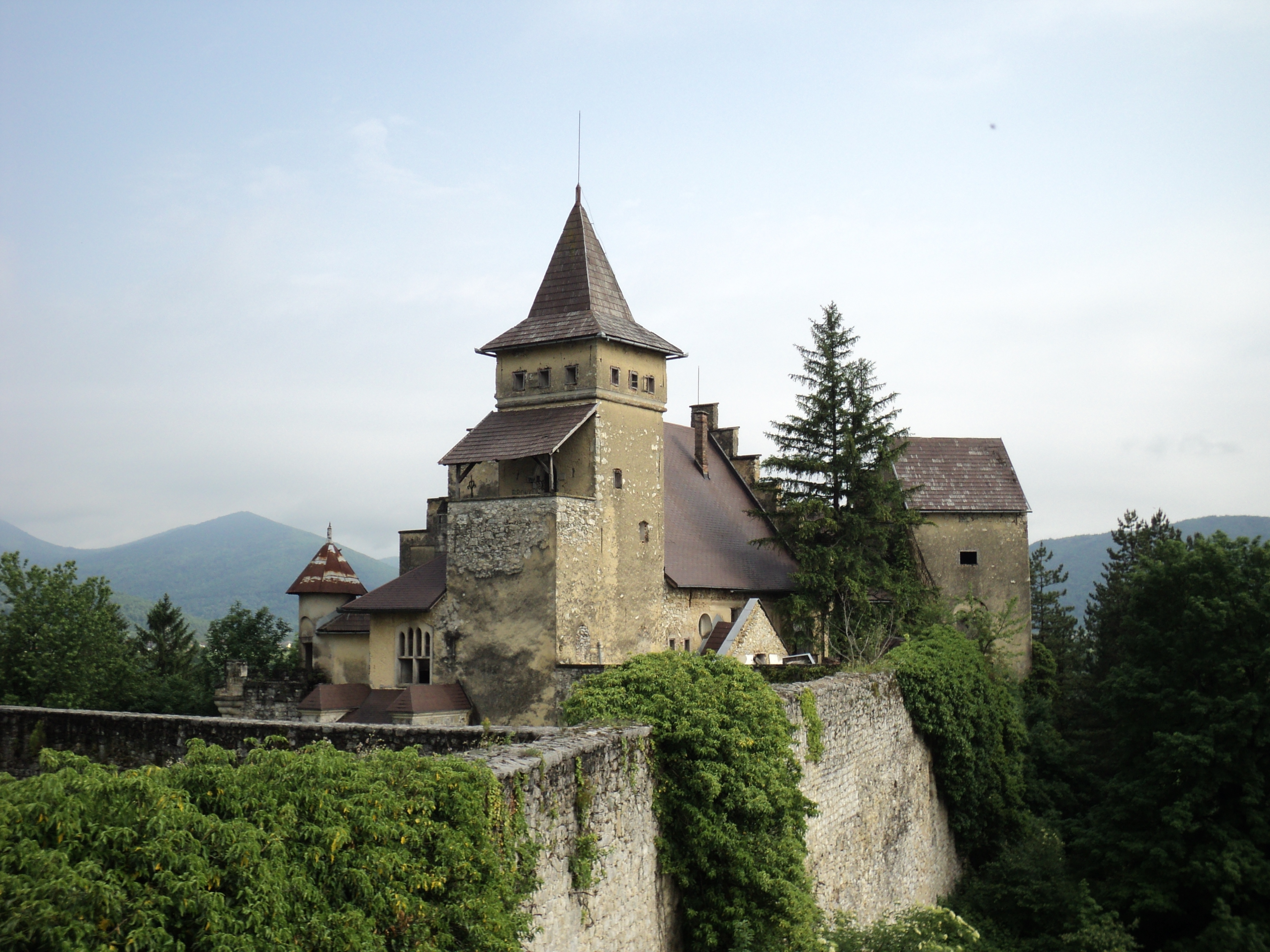
- Ostrožac Castle

Site information
- Type: Castle

Site history
- Built: 13th century

Garrison information
- Designations

KONS of Bosnia and Herzegovina
- Official name: Ostrožac Castle, the architectural ensemble
- Type: Category II cultural and historical property
- Designated: November 7, 2013 (?th session)
- Reference no.: 3799
- Decision no.: 06.2-2.3-53/13-42
- State: National Monuments of Bosnia and Herzegovina

Ostrožac Castle (Bosnian) is a castle located in Bosnia and Herzegovina in the Una-Sana Canton on the outskirts of the town of Cazin, in the village of Ostrožac. The castle dates back to the 13th century when Ostrožac was part of property of the Croatian noble house of Babonić. In 1592 it was captured by the Ottoman Empire and established as an Ottoman province of Bosnia. The castle was rebuilt between 1900 and 1906 by Mayor of Bihać Lothar Von Berks as a birthday present for his wife, member of the Habsburg family.

On a session held on 7 November 2013, the Commission for National Monuments of Bosnia and Herzegovina decided to designate Ostrožac Castle the National Monument of Bosnia and Herzegovina in a category of the architectural ensemble.

The castle hosts a 55-year old event known under the name Colony of sculptors, Ostrožac. This event produced a number of monumental sculptures carved in bihacite stone, of which more than 150 are left in the castle courtyard as a permanent exhibition, forming the open-air Ostrožac Sculpture Park, unique in Southeastern Europe. According to the decision of the Commission for National Monuments, the sculptures are an "integral and inalienable" part of the architectural ensemble as a wider monument. Tourism and civic organizations of Cazin and Ostrožac use the castle grounds for shows, concerts, performances and variety of events. For the time being, the castle complex is being repaired at slow pace and only most urgent repairs have been done, although comprehensive plans for restoration of entire complex exist.

== See also ==
- List of castles in Bosnia and Herzegovina
- Cazin
- Una-Sana Canton
