= Toromani =

- Village
- Location within Bosnia and Herzegovina
- Coordinates: 45°00′N 15°58′E
- Country: Bosnia and Herzegovina
- Entity: Federation of Bosnia and Herzegovina
- Canton: Una-Sana
- Municipality: Cazin

Area
  - Total: 0.88 sq mi (2.29 km^{2})

Population (2013)
  - Total: 576
  - Density: 651/sq mi (252/km^{2})
- Time zone: UTC+1 (CET)
  - Summer (DST): UTC+2 (CEST)

Toromani is a village in the municipality of Cazin, Bosnia and Herzegovina.

== Demographics ==
According to the 2013 census, its population was 576.

Ethnicity in 2013
Ethnicity	Number	Percentage
Bosniaks	568	98.6%
other/undeclared	8	1.4%
Total	576	100%
