= Liđani =

- Village
- Location within Bosnia and Herzegovina
- Coordinates: 45°03′N 15°57′E
- Country: Bosnia and Herzegovina
- Entity: Federation of Bosnia and Herzegovina
- Canton: Una-Sana
- Municipality: Cazin

Area
  - Total: 0.90 sq mi (2.33 km^{2})

Population (2013)
  - Total: 187
  - Density: 208/sq mi (80.3/km^{2})
- Time zone: UTC+1 (CET)
  - Summer (DST): UTC+2 (CEST)

Liđani is a village in the municipality of Cazin, Bosnia and Herzegovina.

== Demographics ==
According to the 2013 census, its population was 187.

Ethnicity in 2013
Ethnicity	Number	Percentage
Bosniaks	186	99.5%
Serbs	1	0.5%
Total	187	100%
