= Glogovac, Cazin =

Glogovac Глоговац
- Village
- Location within Bosnia and Herzegovina
- Coordinates: 44.9419°N 15.9853°E
- Country: Bosnia and Herzegovina
- Entity: Federation of Bosnia and Herzegovina
- Canton: Una-Sana
- Municipality: Cazin

Area
  - Total: 1.61 sq mi (4.17 km^{2})

Population (2013)
  - Total: 1,286
  - Density: 799/sq mi (308/km^{2})
- Time zone: UTC+1 (CET)
  - Summer (DST): UTC+2 (CEST)

Glogovac is a village in the municipality of Cazin, Bosnia and Herzegovina.

== Demographics ==
According to the 2013 census, its population was 1,286.

Ethnicity in 2013
Ethnicity	Number	Percentage
Bosniaks	1,263	98.2%
other/undeclared	23	1.8%
Total	1,286	100%
