= Rujnica (Cazin) =

- Village
- Location within Bosnia and Herzegovina
- Country: Bosnia and Herzegovina
- Entity: Federation of Bosnia and Herzegovina
- Canton: Una-Sana
- Municipality: Cazin

Area
  - Total: 3.95 sq mi (10.24 km^{2})

Population (2013)
  - Total: 841
  - Density: 213/sq mi (82.1/km^{2})
- Time zone: UTC+1 (CET)
  - Summer (DST): UTC+2 (CEST)

Rujnica is a village in the municipality of Cazin, Bosnia and Herzegovina.

== Demographics ==
According to the 2013 census, its population was 841.

Ethnicity in 2013
Ethnicity	Number	Percentage
Bosniaks	836	99.4%
other/undeclared	5	0.6%
Total	841	100%
