= Polje (Cazin) =

- Village
- Location within Bosnia and Herzegovina
- Country: Bosnia and Herzegovina
- Entity: Federation of Bosnia and Herzegovina
- Canton: Una-Sana
- Municipality: Cazin

Area
  - Total: 2.34 sq mi (6.07 km^{2})

Population (2013)
  - Total: 1,648
  - Density: 703/sq mi (271/km^{2})
- Time zone: UTC+1 (CET)
  - Summer (DST): UTC+2 (CEST)

Polje is a village in the municipality of Cazin, Bosnia and Herzegovina.

== Demographics ==
According to the 2013 census, its population was 1,648.

Ethnicity in 2013
Ethnicity	Number	Percentage
Bosniaks	1,598	97.0%
Croats	4	0.2%
other/undeclared	46	2.8%
Total	1,648	100%
