= Brezova Kosa =

- Village
- Location within Bosnia and Herzegovina
- Coordinates: 45.017551°N 15.925295°E
- Country: Bosnia and Herzegovina
- Entity: Federation of Bosnia and Herzegovina
- Canton: Una-Sana
- Municipality: Cazin

Area
  - Total: 2.51 sq mi (6.49 km^{2})

Population (2013)
  - Total: 824
  - Density: 329/sq mi (127/km^{2})
- Time zone: UTC+1 (CET)
  - Summer (DST): UTC+2 (CEST)

Brezova Kosa is a village in the municipality of Cazin, Bosnia and Herzegovina.

== Demographics ==
According to the 2013 census, its population was 824.

Ethnicity in 2013
Ethnicity	Number	Percentage
Bosniaks	792	96.1%
Croats	2	0.2%
other/undeclared	30	3.6%
Total	824	100%
