= Tržačka Platnica =

- Village
- Location within Bosnia and Herzegovina
- Country: Bosnia and Herzegovina
- Entity: Federation of Bosnia and Herzegovina
- Canton: Una-Sana
- Municipality: Cazin

Area
  - Total: 2.05 sq mi (5.30 km^{2})

Population (2013)
  - Total: 696
  - Density: 340/sq mi (131/km^{2})
- Time zone: UTC+1 (CET)
  - Summer (DST): UTC+2 (CEST)

Tržačka Platnica is a village in the municipality of Cazin, Bosnia and Herzegovina.

== Demographics ==
According to the 2013 census, its population was 696.

Ethnicity in 2013
Ethnicity	Number	Percentage
Bosniaks	688	98.9%
other/undeclared	8	1.1%
Total	696	100%
