= Šturlićka Platnica =

- Village
- Location within Bosnia and Herzegovina
- Coordinates: 45°03′N 15°49′E
- Country: Bosnia and Herzegovina
- Entity: Federation of Bosnia and Herzegovina
- Canton: Una-Sana
- Municipality: Cazin

Area
  - Total: 1.93 sq mi (4.99 km^{2})

Population (2013)
  - Total: 757
  - Density: 393/sq mi (152/km^{2})
- Time zone: UTC+1 (CET)
  - Summer (DST): UTC+2 (CEST)

Šturlićka Platnica is a village in the municipality of Cazin, Bosnia and Herzegovina.

== Demographics ==
According to the 2013 census, its population was 757.

Ethnicity in 2013
Ethnicity	Number	Percentage
Bosniaks	715	94.5%
Croats	11	1.5%
other/undeclared	31	4.1%
Total	757	100%
