= Kovačevići (Cazin) =

- Village
- Location within Bosnia and Herzegovina
- Country: Bosnia and Herzegovina
- Entity: Federation of Bosnia and Herzegovina
- Canton: Una-Sana
- Municipality: Cazin

Area
  - Total: 1.66 sq mi (4.29 km^{2})

Population (2013)
  - Total: 886
  - Density: 535/sq mi (207/km^{2})
- Time zone: UTC+1 (CET)
  - Summer (DST): UTC+2 (CEST)

Kovačevići is a village in the municipality of Cazin, Bosnia and Herzegovina.

== Demographics ==
According to the 2013 census, its population was 886.

Ethnicity in 2013
| Ethnicity | Number | Percentage |
|---|---|---|
| Bosniaks | 876 | 98.9% |
| Croats | 1 | 0.1% |
| other/undeclared | 9 | 1.0% |
| Total | 886 | 100% |
