= Gornja Barska =

- Village
- Location within Bosnia and Herzegovina
- Coordinates: 45°02′N 15°54′E
- Country: Bosnia and Herzegovina
- Entity: Federation of Bosnia and Herzegovina
- Canton: Una-Sana
- Municipality: Cazin

Area
  - Total: 3.10 sq mi (8.02 km^{2})

Population (2013)
  - Total: 1,268
  - Density: 409/sq mi (158/km^{2})
- Time zone: UTC+1 (CET)
  - Summer (DST): UTC+2 (CEST)

Gornja Barska is a village in the municipality of Cazin, Bosnia and Herzegovina.

== Demographics ==
According to the 2013 census, its population was 1,268.

Ethnicity in 2013
Ethnicity	Number	Percentage
Bosniaks	1,177	92.8%
Croats	17	1.3%
other/undeclared	74	5.8%
Total	1,268	100%
