= Rošići =

- Village
- Location within Bosnia and Herzegovina
- Country: Bosnia and Herzegovina
- Entity: Federation of Bosnia and Herzegovina
- Canton: Una-Sana
- Municipality: Cazin

Area
  - Total: 1.41 sq mi (3.64 km^{2})

Population (2013)
  - Total: 522
  - Density: 371/sq mi (143/km^{2})
- Time zone: UTC+1 (CET)
  - Summer (DST): UTC+2 (CEST)

Rošići is a village in the municipality of Cazin, Bosnia and Herzegovina.

== Demographics ==
According to the 2013 census, its population was 522.

Ethnicity in 2013
Ethnicity	Number	Percentage
Bosniaks	432	82.8%
Croats	1	0.2%
Serbs	1	0.2%
other/undeclared	88	16.9%
Total	522	100%
