= Ponjevići =

- Village
- Location within Bosnia and Herzegovina
- Country: Bosnia and Herzegovina
- Entity: Federation of Bosnia and Herzegovina
- Canton: Una-Sana
- Municipality: Cazin

Area
  - Total: 1.14 sq mi (2.95 km^{2})

Population (2013)
  - Total: 457
  - Density: 401/sq mi (155/km^{2})
- Time zone: UTC+1 (CET)
  - Summer (DST): UTC+2 (CEST)

Ponjevići is a village in the municipality of the Hercegovine region of Bosnia and Herzegovina.

== Demographics ==
According to the 2013 census, its population was 457.

Ethnicity in 2013
Ethnicity	Number	Percentage
Bosniaks	399	87.3%
Croats	1	0.2%
other/undeclared	57	12.5%
Total	457	100%
