= Galaja resistance (1992) =

Galaja 92' was a Bosnian defense action

Standoff at Galaja forest
- Part of the Bosnian War
Date	14 May – 3 June 1992
Location	Vrhpolje and Galaja Forest (near Sanski Most), Bosnia and Herzegovina
Result	Tactical ARBiH victory and negotiated withdrawal: Encircling Bosniak defenders successfully captured a VRS battalion command element.; Negotiated safe passage allowed 144 fighters of the Ključ-Sana Battalion to retreat to the Bihać pocket.

Belligerents
Republic of Bosnia and Herzegovina	Republika Srpska

Commanders and leaders
Amir Avdić; Arif Hukanović; Ifet Hukanović	Branko Basara; Milan Škondrić; Drago Samardžija

Units involved
TO Vrhpolje; Ključ-Sana Battalion	Army of Republika Srpska; 6th Sana Light Infantry Brigade; 3rd Petrovac Light Infantry Brigade; 17th Ključ Light Infantry Brigade

Strength
~200 fighters	~1,000+ soldiers (6th Sana Brigade units)

Casualties and losses
1 dead, several wounded	~10–12 casualties ~30–45 captured (later exchanged for safe passage)

The Galaja Resistance refers to a series of armed engagements and a tactical forest encirclement standoff between local Bosniak territorial defense units and the Army of Republika Srpska (VRS) in late May and early June 1992. Centered in the Galaja forest, but also in Vrhpolje during the opening months of the Bosnian War, the standoff is documented in International Criminal Tribunal for the former Yugoslavia (ICTY) transcripts and judicial judgments as a instance of early organized armed defense in northwestern Bosnia.

Faced with mandatory disarmament ultimatums issued by Bosnian Serbs, local Bosniak volunteers refused to surrender their weapons. Following skirmishes along the Sanica and Sana river valleys, defensive groups consolidated into the Ključ-Sana Battalion under commander Amir Avdić and retreated into the dense forest terrain of Galaja. After surrounding a VRS forward command element in a counter-ambush, the unit negotiated a safe passage for 144 fighters through Serb-controlled territory into the Bihać pocket.

== Background ==
Following the declaration of independence by Bosnia and Herzegovina in early 1992, political and military tensions escalated rapidly across the Bosanska Krajina region. In April and May 1992, newly formed Bosnian Serb crisis staffs, supported by the Yugoslav People's Army (JNA) and regional paramilitary forces, issued decrees demanding that non-Serb police officers and civilians hand over all firearms and swear loyalty to Republika Srpska. In the municipality of Sanski Most, local Territorial Defense (TO) elements in the Bosniak-majority village of Vrhpolje rejected the disarmament demands. Under local organizers including Arif Hukanović and Ifet Hukanović, armed volunteers mobilized to set up defensive posts and monitor movements along the Sanski Most–Ključ transit corridor.

== Escalation and Clashes ==
By late May 1992, the VRS initiated widespread clearing operations to secure strategic river valleys across Sanski Most and Ključ. On 27 May 1992, armed confrontations broke out near Vrhpolje when local Bosniak defenders engaged advancing infantry and armor units. Under heavy artillery bombardment from surrounding positions held by the VRS 6th Sana Light Infantry Brigade, defenders from Sanski Most, Hrustovo, and Ključ reorganized into the unified Ključ-Sana Battalion. Outnumbered and lacking heavy weaponry, approximately 200 fighters executed a tactical retreat into the dense, high-elevation terrain of the Galaja forest.

=== The Standoff at Galaja Forest ===
On 3 June 1992, elements of the VRS 6th Sana Brigade completely encircled the Galaja forest to neutralize the remaining pocket of resistance. Low on food and ammunition, the trapped defenders monitored enemy unit positions across the perimeter. After scouting parties intercepted VRS communications indicating an immediate sweep of the woods, commander Amir Avdić ordered a rapid counter-strike. Taking advantage of heavy tree coverage, the defenders launched a surprise counter-ambush that surrounded a VRS battalion command post, capturing between 30 and 45 soldiers and officers, including battalion commander Captain Radaković.

=== Negotiations and Breakout ===
Holding military captives inside the forest altered the tactical situation. Using captured radio communications equipment, Bosniak commanders initiated direct negotiations with VRS brigade commander Branko Basara.

Over the course of 24 hours, a truce agreement was established: the captured VRS officers and soldiers were returned unharmed in exchange for transport for the resistance unit. A convoy of buses evacuated 144 fighters of the Ključ-Sana Battalion and POWs of 6th Sana Brigade through Serb-held territory into the free territory of the Bihać pocket, where they integrated into the 5th Corps of the ARBiH. Among those left behind, a smaller group of captured fighters and civilians was transported to the notorious Kamenica Camp near Drvar, where they were executed. And one part of that unit headed by Arif Hukanovic remained fighting as guerrilla fighters.

Testifying as the second Prosecution witness, Ifet Hukanovic stated that his brother and nephew were captured in the Galaja forest near Sanski Most in 1992. He later learned they were tortured and killed in Kamenica.

== Aftermath and Legacy ==
Following the evacuation of the fighters, VRS forces consolidated full military control over Sanski Most and Ključ, which was followed by widespread expulsions and atrocities against the civilian population, including executions at the Vrhpolje bridge. The standoff is commemorated annually in Vrhpolje and Sanski Most as an early sign of organized resistance in western Bosnia.
