= Zmajevac (Cazin) =

- Village
- Location within Bosnia and Herzegovina
- Coordinates: 44°56′15″N 16°03′47″E
- Country: Bosnia and Herzegovina
- Entity: Federation of Bosnia and Herzegovina
- Canton: Una-Sana
- Municipality: Cazin

Area
  - Total: 0.66 sq mi (1.70 km^{2})

Population (2013)
  - Total: 439
  - Density: 669/sq mi (258/km^{2})
- Time zone: UTC+1 (CET)
  - Summer (DST): UTC+2 (CEST)

Zmajevac is a village in the municipality of Cazin, Bosnia and Herzegovina.

== Demographics ==
According to the 2013 census, its population was 439, all Bosniaks.
