= Collectivization in Yugoslavia =

State agricultural policy, 1946–1952

The Federal People's Republic of Yugoslavia enforced the collectivization (Serbo-Croatian: колективизација / kolektivizacija) of its agricultural sector between 1946 and 1952. The policy, as per directions issued in February 1946, aimed to consolidate individual landholdings and labour into collective farms (Peasants' Work Cooperatives). The Yugoslav government followed the pattern of the Soviet Union, with two types of farms, the state farms and collective farms. The peasants' holdings were operated under government supervision, the state farms owned by the governments were operated by hired labour. Of the European communist states, Yugoslavia ranked second, behind Bulgaria, in proportion of peasant households in collectives. In 1950, 21.9% of arable land and 18.1% of households were under collectivization. The Cazin rebellion of May 1950 was a peasant revolt against the state's collectivization efforts and was a factor in the abandonment of collectivization that occurred throughout the 1950s in Yugoslavia.

== See also ==
- Collectivization in the Soviet Union
- Economy of the Socialist Federal Republic of Yugoslavia

== Sources ==
- Myers, Paul F.; Campbell, Arthur A. (1954). The Population of Yugoslavia. U.S. Government Printing Office. OCLC 4265204.
