= Kapići =

- Village
- Location within Bosnia and Herzegovina
- Country: Bosnia and Herzegovina
- Entity: Federation of Bosnia and Herzegovina
- Canton: Una-Sana
- Municipality: Cazin

Area
  - Total: 0.75 sq mi (1.95 km^{2})

Population (2013)
  - Total: 741
  - Density: 984/sq mi (380/km^{2})
- Time zone: UTC+1 (CET)
  - Summer (DST): UTC+2 (CEST)

Kapići is a village in the municipality of Cazin, Bosnia and Herzegovina.

== Demographics ==
According to the 2013 census, its population was 741.

Ethnicity in 2013
Ethnicity	Number	Percentage
Bosniaks	728	98.2%
Croats	6	0.8%
other/undeclared	7	0.9%
Total	741	100%
