= Hadžin Potok =

- Village
- Location within Bosnia and Herzegovina
- Coordinates: 45°04′N 15°45′E
- Country: Bosnia and Herzegovina
- Entity: Federation of Bosnia and Herzegovina
- Canton: Una-Sana
- Municipality: Cazin

Area
  - Total: 0.73 sq mi (1.9 km^{2})

Population (2013)
  - Total: 135
  - Density: 180/sq mi (71/km^{2})
- Time zone: UTC+1 (CET)
  - Summer (DST): UTC+2 (CEST)
- Area code: (+387) 37

Hadžin Potok is a village in the municipality of Cazin, Bosnia and Herzegovina.

== Demographics ==
According to the 2013 census, its population was 135, all Bosniaks.
