= Prošići =

Prošići Прошићи
- Village
- Location within Bosnia and Herzegovina
- Country: Bosnia and Herzegovina
- Entity: Federation of Bosnia and Herzegovina
- Canton: Una-Sana
- Municipality: Cazin

Area
  - Total: 2.09 sq mi (5.42 km^{2})

Population (2013)
  - Total: 918
  - Density: 439/sq mi (169/km^{2})
- Time zone: UTC+1 (CET)
  - Summer (DST): UTC+2 (CEST)

Prošići (Serbian Cyrillic: Прошићи) is a village in the municipality of Cazin, Bosnia and Herzegovina.

== Demographics ==
According to the 2013 census, its population was 918.

Ethnicity in 2013
Ethnicity	Number	Percentage
Bosniaks	909	99.0%
Croats	1	0.1%
other/undeclared	8	0.9%
Total	918	100%
