= Urga (Cazin) =

- Village
- Location within Bosnia and Herzegovina
- Coordinates: 44°59′44″N 15°47′55″E
- Country: Bosnia and Herzegovina
- Entity: Federation of Bosnia and Herzegovina
- Canton: Una-Sana
- Municipality: Cazin

Area
  - Total: 2.86 sq mi (7.42 km^{2})

Population (2013)
  - Total: 1,772
  - Density: 619/sq mi (239/km^{2})
- Time zone: UTC+1 (CET)
  - Summer (DST): UTC+2 (CEST)

Urga (Serbian: Урга) is a village in the municipality of Cazin, Bosnia and Herzegovina.

== Demographics ==
According to the 2013 census, its population was 1,772.

Ethnicity in 2013
Ethnicity	Number	Percentage
Bosniaks	1,725	97.3%
Croats	5	0.3%
Serbs	1	0.1%
other/undeclared	41	2.3%
Total	1,772	100%
