= Rebellions in Bosnia and Herzegovina =

This page lists major rebellions and revolutions that have taken place during Bosnian history.

== Ottoman Empire (1463–1878) ==
- Serb Uprising (1596–1597)
- Jančić's rebellion (1809)
- Bosnian uprising (1831–32)
- Priest Jovica's Rebellion (1834)
- Second Mašići Rebellion (1834)
- Posavina rebellion (1836)
- Herzegovina uprising (1852–1862)
- Montenegrin–Ottoman War (1852–53)
- Pecija's First Revolt (1858)
- Herzegovina uprising (1875–1877)

== Austro-Hungarian Empire (1878–1918) ==
- Bosnian Uprising (1878)
- Herzegovina Uprising (1882)

== Kingdom of Yugoslavia (1918–41) ==
- Husino rebellion (1920)

== World War II (1941–45) ==
- May 1941 Sanski Most revolt (1941)
- June 1941 uprising in eastern Herzegovina (1941)
- Drvar uprising (1941)
- Srb uprising (1941)

== SFR Yugoslavia (1945–92) ==
- Cazin rebellion (1950)
- Unrest in SR Bosnia and Herzegovina (1992)

== Post-independence (1995–present) ==
- JMBG protests (2013)
- Unrest in Bosnia and Herzegovina (2014)

== See also ==
- Bosnian War
