= Bukovica, Cazin =

Bukovica
- Village
- Location within Bosnia and Herzegovina
- Coordinates: 44°56′55″N 15°49′42″E
- Country: Bosnia and Herzegovina
- Entity: Federation of Bosnia and Herzegovina
- Canton: Una-Sana
- Municipality: Cazin

Area
  - Total: 2.15 sq mi (5.56 km^{2})

Population (2013)
  - Total: 425
  - Density: 198/sq mi (76.4/km^{2})
- Time zone: UTC+1 (CET)
  - Summer (DST): UTC+2 (CEST)

Bukovica is a village in the municipality of Cazin, Bosnia and Herzegovina.

== Demographics ==
According to the 2013 census, its population was 425.

Ethnicity in 2013
Ethnicity	Number	Percentage
Bosniaks	423	99.5%
other/undeclared	2	0.5%
Total	425	100%
