= Ljubijankići =

- Village
- Location within Bosnia and Herzegovina
- Coordinates: 45°02′N 15°58′E
- Country: Bosnia and Herzegovina
- Entity: Federation of Bosnia and Herzegovina
- Canton: Una-Sana
- Municipality: Cazin

Area
  - Total: 2.25 sq mi (5.82 km^{2})

Population (2013)
  - Total: 768
  - Density: 342/sq mi (132/km^{2})
- Time zone: UTC+1 (CET)
  - Summer (DST): UTC+2 (CEST)

Ljubijankići is a village in the municipality of Cazin, Bosnia and Herzegovina.

== Demographics ==
According to the 2013 census, its population was 768.

Ethnicity in 2013
Ethnicity	Number	Percentage
Bosniaks	762	99.2%
Croats	1	0.1%
other/undeclared	5	0.7%
Total	768	100%
