= Mujakići =

- Village
- Location within Bosnia and Herzegovina
- Coordinates: 45°04′N 15°52′E
- Country: Bosnia and Herzegovina
- Entity: Federation of Bosnia and Herzegovina
- Canton: Una-Sana
- Municipality: Cazin

Area
  - Total: 1.08 sq mi (2.81 km^{2})

Population (2013)
  - Total: 211
  - Density: 194/sq mi (75.1/km^{2})
- Time zone: UTC+1 (CET)
  - Summer (DST): UTC+2 (CEST)

Mujakići is a village in the municipality of Cazin, Bosnia and Herzegovina.

== Demographics ==
According to the 2013 census, its population was 211.

Ethnicity in 2013
Ethnicity	Number	Percentage
Bosniaks	177	83.9%
other/undeclared	34	16.1%
Total	211	100%
