= Majetići =

- Village
- Location within Bosnia and Herzegovina
- Country: Bosnia and Herzegovina
- Entity: Federation of Bosnia and Herzegovina
- Canton: Una-Sana
- Municipality: Cazin

Area
  - Total: 3.23 sq mi (8.37 km^{2})

Population (2013)
  - Total: 1,547
  - Density: 479/sq mi (185/km^{2})
- Time zone: UTC+1 (CET)
  - Summer (DST): UTC+2 (CEST)

Majetići is a village in the municipality of Cazin, Bosnia and Herzegovina.

== Demographics ==
According to the 2013 census, its population was 1,547.

Ethnicity in 2013
Ethnicity	Number	Percentage
Bosniaks	1,541	99.6%
Croats	2	0.1%
other/undeclared	4	0.3%
Total	1,547	100%
