= Vilenjača =

- Village
- Location within Bosnia and Herzegovina
- Country: Bosnia and Herzegovina
- Entity: Federation of Bosnia and Herzegovina
- Canton: Una-Sana
- Municipality: Cazin

Area
  - Total: 3.94 sq mi (10.20 km^{2})

Population (2013)
  - Total: 911
  - Density: 231/sq mi (89.3/km^{2})
- Time zone: UTC+1 (CET)
  - Summer (DST): UTC+2 (CEST)

Vilenjača is a village in the municipality of Cazin, Bosnia and Herzegovina.

== Demographics ==
According to the 2013 census, its population was 911.

Ethnicity in 2013
Ethnicity	Number	Percentage
Bosniaks	906	99.5%
Croats	1	0.1%
other/undeclared	4	0.4%
Total	911	100%
