= Čajići =

- Village
- Location within Bosnia and Herzegovina
- Country: Bosnia and Herzegovina
- Entity: Federation of Bosnia and Herzegovina
- Canton: Una-Sana
- Municipality: Cazin

Area
  - Total: 3.49 sq mi (9.03 km^{2})

Population (2013)
  - Total: 1,414
  - Density: 406/sq mi (157/km^{2})
- Time zone: UTC+1 (CET)
  - Summer (DST): UTC+2 (CEST)

Čajići is a village in the municipality of Cazin, Bosnia and Herzegovina.

== Demographics ==
According to the 2013 census, its population was 1,414.

Ethnicity in 2013
| Ethnicity | Number | Percentage |
|---|---|---|
| Bosniaks | 1,372 | 97.0% |
| Croats | 4 | 0.3% |
| other/undeclared | 38 | 2.7% |
| Total | 1,414 | 100% |
