= Ostrožac, Cazin =

Ostrožac Острожац
- Village
- Location within Bosnia and Herzegovina
- Coordinates: 44°54′31″N 15°56′25″E
- Country: Bosnia and Herzegovina
- Entity: Federation of Bosnia and Herzegovina
- Canton: Una-Sana
- Municipality: Cazin

Area
  - Total: 3.53 sq mi (9.13 km^{2})

Population (2013)
  - Total: 2,068
  - Density: 587/sq mi (227/km^{2})
- Time zone: UTC+1 (CET)
  - Summer (DST): UTC+2 (CEST)

Ostrožac (Serbian Cyrillic: Острожац) is a village in the municipality of Cazin, Bosnia and Herzegovina.

Ostrožac Castle is located here.

== History ==
It was first mentioned in 1286 as the city of the Dukes of Blagaj. It was occupied by the Ottoman Empire in 1577.

== Demographics ==
According to the 2013 census, its population was 2,068.

Ethnicity in 2013
Ethnicity	Number	Percentage
Bosniaks	2,007	97.1%
Croats	3	0.1%
Serbs	2	0.1%
other/undeclared	56	2.7%
Total	2,068	100%
