= Kličići =

- Village
- Location within Bosnia and Herzegovina
- Coordinates: 45°01′08″N 15°55′07″E
- Country: Bosnia and Herzegovina
- Entity: Federation of Bosnia and Herzegovina
- Canton: Una-Sana
- Municipality: Cazin

Area
  - Total: 1.41 sq mi (3.66 km^{2})

Population (2013)
  - Total: 707
  - Density: 500/sq mi (193/km^{2})
- Time zone: UTC+1 (CET)
  - Summer (DST): UTC+2 (CEST)

Kličići (Serbian: Кличићи) is a village in the municipality of Cazin, Bosnia and Herzegovina.

== Demographics ==
According to the 2013 census, its population was 707.

Ethnicity in 2013
Ethnicity	Number	Percentage
Bosniaks	688	97.3%
other/undeclared	19	2.7%
Total	707	100%
