= Pivnice (Cazin) =

Pivnice Пивнице
- Village
- Location within Bosnia and Herzegovina
- Coordinates: 45°00′44″N 15°59′40″E
- Country: Bosnia and Herzegovina
- Entity: Federation of Bosnia and Herzegovina
- Canton: Una-Sana
- Municipality: Cazin

Area
  - Total: 2.08 sq mi (5.40 km^{2})

Population (2013)
  - Total: 584
  - Density: 280/sq mi (108/km^{2})
- Time zone: UTC+1 (CET)
  - Summer (DST): UTC+2 (CEST)

Pivnice is a village in the municipality of Cazin, Bosnia and Herzegovina.

== Demographics ==
According to the 2013 census, its population was 584.

Ethnicity in 2013
Ethnicity	Number	Percentage
Bosniaks	581	99.5%
other/undeclared	3	0.5%
Total	584	100%
