= Stijena, Bosnia and Herzegovina =

Stijena
- Village
- Location within Bosnia and Herzegovina
- Coordinates: 44°56′24″N 16°01′12″E
- Country: Bosnia and Herzegovina
- Entity: Federation of Bosnia and Herzegovina
- Canton: Una-Sana
- Municipality: Cazin

Area
  - Total: 6.41 sq mi (16.59 km^{2})

Population (2013)
  - Total: 2,696
  - Density: 420.9/sq mi (162.5/km^{2})
- Time zone: UTC+1 (CET)
  - Summer (DST): UTC+2 (CEST)

Stijena is a village in the municipality of Cazin, Bosnia and Herzegovina.

== Demographics ==
According to the 2013 census, its population was 2,696.

Ethnicity in 2013
Ethnicity	Number	Percentage
Bosniaks	2,683	99.5%
Croats	1	0.0%
Serbs	1	0.0%
other/undeclared	11	0.4%
Total	2,696	100%
