= Osredak, Cazin =

Osredak Осредак
- Village
- Location within Bosnia and Herzegovina
- Coordinates: 44°56′15″N 15°54′35″E
- Country: Bosnia and Herzegovina
- Entity: Federation of Bosnia and Herzegovina
- Canton: Una-Sana
- Municipality: Cazin

Area
  - Total: 2.62 sq mi (6.79 km^{2})

Population (2013)
  - Total: 657
  - Density: 251/sq mi (96.8/km^{2})
- Time zone: UTC+1 (CET)
  - Summer (DST): UTC+2 (CEST)

Osredak (Serbian: Осредак) is a village in the municipality of Cazin, Bosnia and Herzegovina.

== Demographics ==
According to the 2013 census, its population was 657.

Demographic history
Ethnic group	1948	1953	1961	1971	1981	1991	2013
Bosniaks (or ethnic Muslims)				80 (17,77%)	329 (51,72%)	338 (53,48%)	637 (97,0%)
Serbs				368 (81,77%)	299 (47,01%)	290 (45,88%)	1 (0,2%)
Yugoslavs				0	7 (1,10%)	0	
Others, Unknown				2 (0,44%)	1 (0,15%)	4 (0,63%)	19 (2,9%)
Total				450	636	632	657
