= Koprivna (Zenica) =

Koprivna Копривна
- Village
- Location within Bosnia and Herzegovina
- Coordinates: 44°17′19″N 17°54′43″E
- Country: Bosnia and Herzegovina
- Entity: Federation of Bosnia and Herzegovina
- Canton: Zenica-Doboj
- Municipality: Zenica

Area
  - Total: 2.28 sq mi (5.91 km^{2})

Population (2013)
  - Total: 309
  - Density: 135/sq mi (52.3/km^{2})
- Time zone: UTC+1 (CET)
  - Summer (DST): UTC+2 (CEST)

Koprivna (Cyrillic: Копривна) is a village in the City of Zenica, Bosnia and Herzegovina.

== Demographics ==
According to the 2013 census, its population was 309.

Ethnicity in 2013
Ethnicity	Number	Percentage
Bosniaks	301	97.4%
Serbs	1	0.3%
other/undeclared	7	2.3%
Total	309	100%
