= Gradina, Cazin =

Gradina
- Village
- Location within Bosnia and Herzegovina
- Coordinates: 44°56′37″N 15°53′29″E
- Country: Bosnia and Herzegovina
- Entity: Federation of Bosnia and Herzegovina
- Canton: Una-Sana
- Municipality: Cazin

Area
  - Total: 1.36 sq mi (3.52 km^{2})

Population (2013)
  - Total: 399
  - Density: 294/sq mi (113/km^{2})
- Time zone: UTC+1 (CET)
  - Summer (DST): UTC+2 (CEST)

Gradina is a village in the municipality of Cazin, Bosnia and Herzegovina.

== Demographics ==
According to the 2013 census, its population was 399, all Bosniaks.
