= Pjanići =

- Village
- Location within Bosnia and Herzegovina
- Coordinates: 44°59′N 15°49′E
- Country: Bosnia and Herzegovina
- Entity: Federation of Bosnia and Herzegovina
- Canton: Una-Sana
- Municipality: Cazin

Area
  - Total: 2.81 sq mi (7.27 km^{2})

Population (2013)
  - Total: 1,648
  - Density: 587/sq mi (227/km^{2})
- Time zone: UTC+1 (CET)
  - Summer (DST): UTC+2 (CEST)

Pjanići is a village in the municipality of Cazin, Bosnia and Herzegovina.

== Demographics ==
According to the 2013 census, its population was 1,648.

Ethnicity in 2013
Ethnicity	Number	Percentage
Bosniaks	1,616	98.1%
Croats	8	0.5%
other/undeclared	24	1.5%
Total	1,648	100%
