= Hrustovo, Sanski Most =

Hrustovo
- Village
- Location within Bosnia and Herzegovina
- Coordinates: 44.665161°N 16.711191°E
- Country: Bosnia and Herzegovina
- Entity: Federation of Bosnia and Herzegovina
- Canton: Una-Sana
- Municipality: Sanski Most

Area
  - Total: 7.59 sq mi (19.65 km^{2})

Population (2013)
  - Total: 1,697
  - Density: 223.7/sq mi (86.36/km^{2})
- Time zone: UTC+1 (CET)
  - Summer (DST): UTC+2 (CEST)

Hrustovo is a village in the municipality of Sanski Most, Federation of Bosnia and Herzegovina, Bosnia and Herzegovina.

== Demographics ==
According to the 2013 census, its population was 1,697.

Ethnicity in 2013
Ethnicity	Number	Percentage
Bosniaks	1,694	99.8%
other/undeclared	3	0.2%
Total	1,697	100%
