= Krivaja (Cazin) =

Krivaja Криваја
- Village
- Location within Bosnia and Herzegovina
- Coordinates: 45°00′45″N 15°49′25″E
- Country: Bosnia and Herzegovina
- Entity: Federation of Bosnia and Herzegovina
- Canton: Una-Sana
- Municipality: Cazin

Area
  - Total: 3.46 sq mi (8.97 km^{2})

Population (2013)
  - Total: 1,237
  - Density: 357/sq mi (138/km^{2})
- Time zone: UTC+1 (CET)
  - Summer (DST): UTC+2 (CEST)

Krivaja is a village in the municipality of Cazin, Bosnia and Herzegovina.

== Demographics ==
According to the 2013 census, its population was 1,237.

Ethnicity in 2013
Ethnicity	Number	Percentage
Bosniaks	1,219	98.5%
Croats	4	0.3%
other/undeclared	14	1.1%
Total	1,237	100%
