= Skokovi =

- Village
- Location within Bosnia and Herzegovina
- Coordinates: 45°02′N 15°55′E
- Country: Bosnia and Herzegovina
- Entity: Federation of Bosnia and Herzegovina
- Canton: Una-Sana
- Municipality: Cazin

Area
  - Total: 1.02 sq mi (2.65 km^{2})

Population (2013)
  - Total: 703
  - Density: 687/sq mi (265/km^{2})
- Time zone: UTC+1 (CET)
  - Summer (DST): UTC+2 (CEST)

Skokovi is a village in the municipality of Cazin, Bosnia and Herzegovina.

The village was home to Fikret Abdić's political outfit, the Muslim Democratic Party.

== Demographics ==
According to the 2013 census, its population was 703.

Ethnicity in 2013
Ethnicity	Number	Percentage
Bosniaks	670	95.3%
other/undeclared	33	4.7%
Total	703	100%
