= Tržačka Raštela =

- Village
- Location within Bosnia and Herzegovina
- Coordinates: 44°58′N 15°47′E
- Country: Bosnia and Herzegovina
- Entity: Federation of Bosnia and Herzegovina
- Canton: Una-Sana
- Municipality: Cazin

Area
  - Total: 0.54 sq mi (1.39 km^{2})

Population (2013)
  - Total: 273
  - Density: 509/sq mi (196/km^{2})
- Time zone: UTC+1 (CET)
  - Summer (DST): UTC+2 (CEST)

Tržačka Raštela is a village in the municipality of Cazin, Bosnia and Herzegovina.

== Demographics ==
According to the 2013 census, its population was 273.

Ethnicity in 2013
Ethnicity	Number	Percentage
Bosniaks	265	97.1%
Croats	1	0.4%
Serbs	1	0.4%
other/undeclared	6	2.2%
Total	273	100%
