= Husino =

- Village
- Location within Bosnia and Herzegovina
- Coordinates: 44.5132235°N 18.6013341°E
- Country: Bosnia and Herzegovina
- Entity: Federation of Bosnia and Herzegovina
- Canton: Tuzla
- Municipality: Tuzla

Area
  - Total: 1.72 sq mi (4.46 km^{2})

Population (2013)
  - Total: 951
  - Density: 552/sq mi (213/km^{2})
- Time zone: UTC+1 (CET)
  - Summer (DST): UTC+2 (CEST)

Husino is a village in the municipality of Tuzla, Tuzla Canton, Bosnia and Herzegovina.

== Demographics ==
According to the 2013 census, its population was 951.

Ethnicity in 2013
Ethnicity	Number	Percentage
Croats	804	84.5%
Bosniaks	81	8.5%
Serbs	20	2.1%
other/undeclared	46	4.8%
Total	951	100%
