= Vrelo, Cazin =

Vrelo
- Village
- Location within Bosnia and Herzegovina
- Coordinates: 44°55′28″N 15°52′21″E
- Country: Bosnia and Herzegovina
- Entity: Federation of Bosnia and Herzegovina
- Canton: Una-Sana
- Municipality: Cazin

Area
  - Total: 5.27 sq mi (13.65 km^{2})

Population (2013)
  - Total: 220
  - Density: 42/sq mi (16/km^{2})
- Time zone: UTC+1 (CET)
  - Summer (DST): UTC+2 (CEST)

Vrelo is a village in the municipality of Cazin, Bosnia and Herzegovina.

== Demographics ==
According to the 2013 census, its population was 220.

Ethnicity in 2013
Ethnicity	Number	Percentage
Bosniaks	215	97.7%
Croats	1	0.5%
other/undeclared	4	1.8%
Total	220	100%
