= Mutnik =

- Village
- Location within Bosnia and Herzegovina
- Coordinates: 44°57′46″N 15°51′28″E
- Country: Bosnia and Herzegovina
- Entity: Federation of Bosnia and Herzegovina
- Canton: Una-Sana
- Municipality: Cazin

Area
  - Total: 5.46 sq mi (14.15 km^{2})

Population (2013)
  - Total: 2,662
  - Density: 487.2/sq mi (188.1/km^{2})
- Time zone: UTC+1 (CET)
  - Summer (DST): UTC+2 (CEST)

Mutnik (Serbian: Мутник) is a village in the municipality of Cazin, Bosnia and Herzegovina.

== Demographics ==
According to the 2013 census, its population was 2,662.

Ethnicity in 2013
Ethnicity	Number	Percentage
Bosniaks	2,615	98.2%
Croats	11	0.4%
Serbs	3	0.1%
other/undeclared	33	1.2%
Total	2,662	100%
