= Pećigrad =

- Village
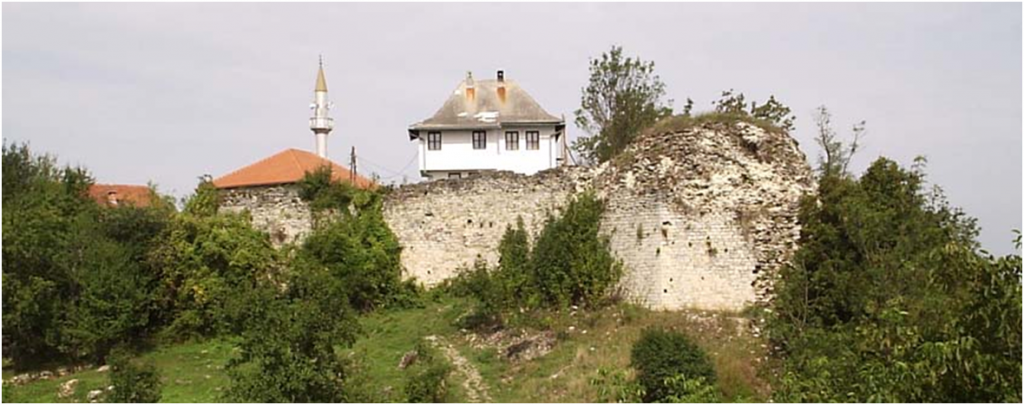
- Old town in Pećigrad

- Location within Bosnia and Herzegovina
- Coordinates: 45°03′N 15°54′E
- Country: Bosnia and Herzegovina
- Entity: Federation of Bosnia and Herzegovina
- Canton: Una-Sana Canton
- Municipality: Cazin

Area
  - Total: 1.50 sq mi (3.89 km^{2})

Population (2013)
  - Total: 960
  - Density: 640/sq mi (250/km^{2})
- Time zone: UTC+1 (CET)
  - Summer (DST): UTC+2 (CEST)

Pećigrad is a village in the municipality of Cazin, Bosnia and Herzegovina.

== Demographics ==
According to the 2013 census, its population was 960.

Ethnicity in 2013
Ethnicity	Number	Percentage
Bosniaks	857	89.3%
Croats	11	1.1%
other/undeclared	92	9.6%
Total	960	100%
