= Miostrah =

Miostrah Миострах
- Village
- Location within Bosnia and Herzegovina
- Country: Bosnia and Herzegovina
- Entity: Federation of Bosnia and Herzegovina
- Canton: Una-Sana
- Municipality: Cazin

Area
  - Total: 5.18 sq mi (13.41 km^{2})

Population (2013)
  - Total: 1,419
  - Density: 274.1/sq mi (105.8/km^{2})
- Time zone: UTC+1 (CET)
  - Summer (DST): UTC+2 (CEST)
- Postal code: 77224

Miostrah (Serbian Cyrillic: Миострах) is a village in the municipality of Cazin, Bosnia and Herzegovina.

== Demographics ==
According to the 2013 census, its population was 1,419.

Ethnicity in 2013
Ethnicity	Number	Percentage
Bosniaks	1,416	99.8%
Serbs	1	0.1%
other/undeclared	2	0.1%
Total	1,419	100%
