= Koprivna (Modriča) =

Koprivna Копривна (Serbian)
- Village (Selo)
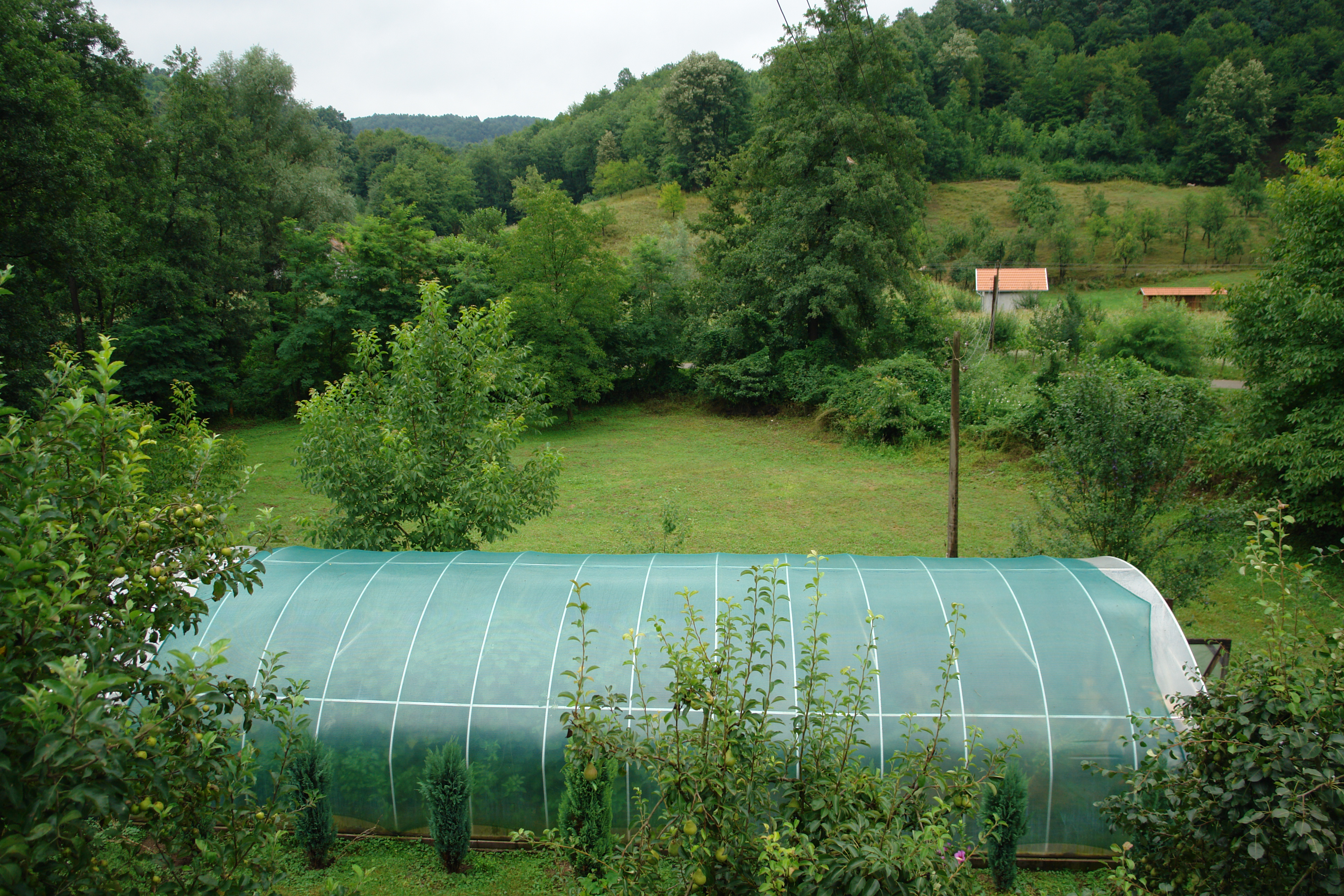

- Location within Bosnia and Herzegovina
- Coordinates: 44°53′28″N 18°09′24″E
- Country: Bosnia and Herzegovina
- Republic: Republika Srpska
- Municipality: Modriča

Population (1991)
  - Total: 2,218
- Time zone: UTC+1 (CET)
  - Summer (DST): UTC+2 (CEST)

Koprivna is a village in the municipality of Modriča, Republika Srpska, Bosnia and Herzegovina. The village has two parts: Upper village (Koprivna Gornja) in a way to Doboj and Lower village (Koprivna Donja) with several helmets within as is Velika rijeka, Mala rijeka, Jezerine, Brgula, Koprivnska Trebava, Seliština and Kremenik.

== Education ==
In the village there is an elementary School "Sveti Sava", 5th grade school. The first school in Koprivna, in Velika Rijeka, was built in 1850, and the second school building in Mala Rijeka in 1927. The third school building in Velika Rijeka and the fourth in Koprivska Trebava were built in 1958, and the current (fifth in a row) building in Selistina was built in 1982. The school has been functioning as an eight-grade school since 1958, and as an independent elementary school "Vuk Karadžić" from 1965 to 1993, when it was merged with the Elementary School "Sveti Sava" Modriča.
