= Gornja Koprivna =

- Village
- Location within Bosnia and Herzegovina
- Country: Bosnia and Herzegovina
- Entity: Federation of Bosnia and Herzegovina
- Canton: Una-Sana
- Municipality: Cazin

Area
  - Total: 4.58 sq mi (11.85 km^{2})

Population (2013)
  - Total: 1,737
  - Density: 379.6/sq mi (146.6/km^{2})
- Time zone: UTC+1 (CET)
  - Summer (DST): UTC+2 (CEST)

Gornja Koprivna is a village in the municipality of Cazin, Bosnia and Herzegovina.

== Demographics ==
According to the 2013 census, its population was 1,737.

Ethnicity in 2013
Ethnicity	Number	Percentage
Bosniaks	1,712	98.6%
Croats	1	0.1%
other/undeclared	24	1.4%
Total	1,737	100%
