= Podgredina =

- Village
- Location within Bosnia and Herzegovina
- Country: Bosnia and Herzegovina
- Entity: Federation of Bosnia and Herzegovina
- Canton: Una-Sana
- Municipality: Cazin

Area
  - Total: 3.89 sq mi (10.08 km^{2})

Population (2013)
  - Total: 2,073
  - Density: 532.6/sq mi (205.7/km^{2})
- Time zone: UTC+1 (CET)
  - Summer (DST): UTC+2 (CEST)

Podgredina is a village in the municipality of Cazin, Bosnia and Herzegovina. It is located 921 metres above sea level.

== Demographics ==
According to the 2013 census, its population was 2,073.

Ethnicity in 2013
Ethnicity	Number	Percentage
Bosniaks	2,066	99.7%
Croats	1	0.0%
Serbs	1	0.0%
other/undeclared	5	0.2%
Total	2,073	100%
