= Bajrići =

Bajrići Бајрићи
- Village
- Location within Bosnia and Herzegovina
- Coordinates: 44°56′24″N 16°03′00″E
- Country: Bosnia and Herzegovina
- Entity: Federation of Bosnia and Herzegovina
- Canton: Una-Sana
- Municipality: Bihać

Area
  - Total: 2.00 sq mi (5.18 km^{2})

Population (2013)
  - Total: 506
  - Density: 253/sq mi (97.7/km^{2})
- Time zone: UTC+1 (CET)
  - Summer (DST): UTC+2 (CEST)

Bajrići (Serbian Cyrillic: Бајрићи) is a village in the municipality of Bihać, Bosnia and Herzegovina.

== Demographics ==
According to the 2013 census, its population was 506.

Ethnicity in 2013
Ethnicity	Number	Percentage
Bosniaks	498	98.4%
other/undeclared	8	1.6%
Total	506	100%
