= Crnaja (Cazin) =

- Village
- Location within Bosnia and Herzegovina
- Coordinates: 45°02′02″N 15°47′18″E
- Country: Bosnia and Herzegovina
- Entity: Federation of Bosnia and Herzegovina
- Canton: Una-Sana
- Municipality: Cazin

Area
  - Total: 2.98 sq mi (7.72 km^{2})

Population (2013)
  - Total: 361
  - Density: 121/sq mi (46.8/km^{2})
- Time zone: UTC+1 (CET)
  - Summer (DST): UTC+2 (CEST)

Crnaja is a village in the municipality of Cazin, Bosnia and Herzegovina.

== Demographics ==
According to the 2013 census, its population was 361.

Ethnicity in 2013
Ethnicity	Number	Percentage
Bosniaks	355	98.3%
Croats	1	0.3%
other/undeclared	5	1.4%
Total	361	100%
