= Donja Koprivna =

- Village
- Location within Bosnia and Herzegovina
- Country: Bosnia and Herzegovina
- Entity: Federation of Bosnia and Herzegovina
- Canton: Una-Sana
- Municipality: Cazin

Area
  - Total: 4.49 sq mi (11.64 km^{2})

Population (2013)
  - Total: 1,249
  - Density: 277.9/sq mi (107.3/km^{2})
- Time zone: UTC+1 (CET)
  - Summer (DST): UTC+2 (CEST)

Donja Koprivna is a village in the municipality of Cazin, Bosnia and Herzegovina.

== Demographics ==
According to the 2013 census, its population was 1,249.

Ethnicity in 2013
Ethnicity	Number	Percentage
Bosniaks	1,238	99.1%
Croats	3	0.2%
other/undeclared	8	0.6%
Total	1,249	100%
