= Liskovac (Cazin) =

- Village
- Location within Bosnia and Herzegovina
- Coordinates: 45°02′36″N 15°50′52″E
- Country: Bosnia and Herzegovina
- Entity: Federation of Bosnia and Herzegovina
- Canton: Una-Sana
- Municipality: Cazin

Area
  - Total: 4.39 sq mi (11.36 km^{2})

Population (2013)
  - Total: 1,493
  - Density: 340.4/sq mi (131.4/km^{2})
- Time zone: UTC+1 (CET)
  - Summer (DST): UTC+2 (CEST)

Liskovac (Serbian: Лисковац) is a village in the municipality of Cazin, Bosnia and Herzegovina.

== Demographics ==
According to the 2013 census, its population was 1,493.

Ethnicity in 2013
Ethnicity	Number	Percentage
Bosniaks	1,333	89.3%
Croats	7	0.5%
other/undeclared	153	10.2%
Total	1,493	100%
