= Cazin =

- City
- Grad Cazin; City of Cazin
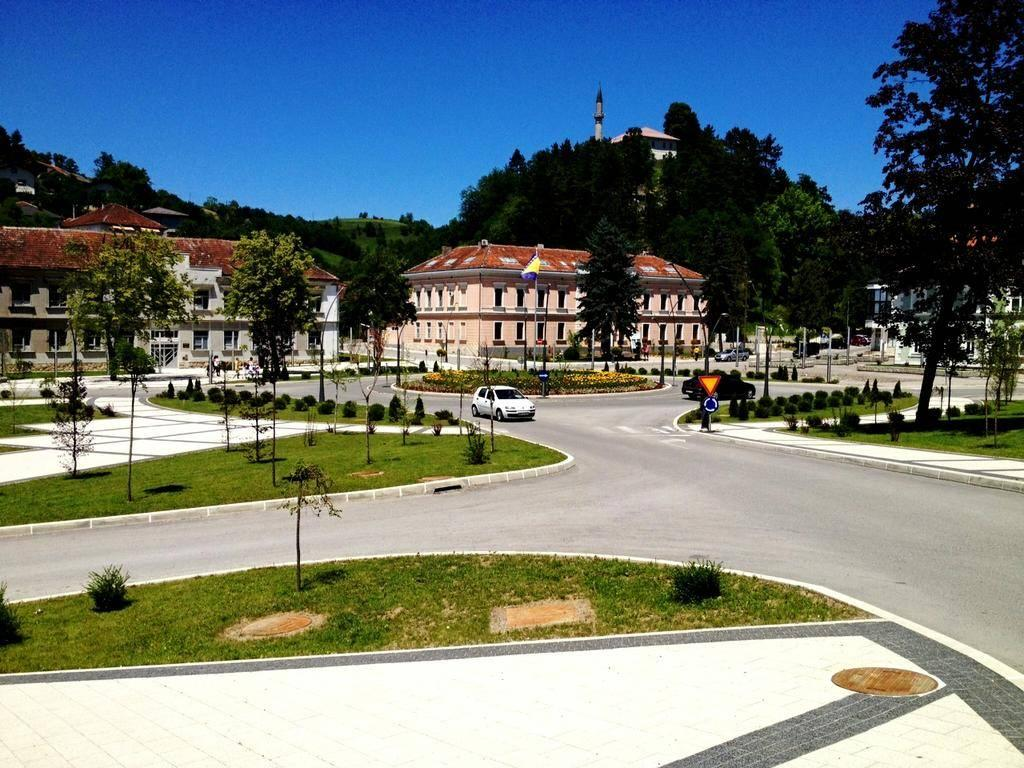
- City center square

- Flag Coat of arms

- Location of Cazin within Bosnia and Herzegovina

- Location within Bosnia and Herzegovina Location within Balkans
- Coordinates: 44°58′N 15°56′E
- Country: Bosnia and Herzegovina
- Entity: Federation of Bosnia and Herzegovina
- Canton: Una-Sana
- Geographical region: Bosanska Krajina

Government
  - Mayor: Nermin Ogrešević (NES)

Area
  - City: 356 km^{2} (137 sq mi)

Population (Census 2013)
  - City: 66,149
  - Density: 186/km^{2} (481/sq mi)
  - Urban: 13,863
  - Rural: 52,286
- Time zone: UTC+1 (CET)
  - Summer (DST): UTC+2 (CEST)
- Area code: +387 37
- Website: gradcazin.gov.ba

Cazin is the largest city in the Una-Sana Canton of the Federation of Bosnia and Herzegovina, an entity of Bosnia and Herzegovina. It is situated in northwest Bosnia and Herzegovina in the Bosanska Krajina region, near the border with Croatia. As of 2013, it has a population of 66,149 inhabitants. The municipality is often also called Cazinska Krajina. The town of Cazin is located on the main road which connects Bihać and Velika Kladuša.

== History ==
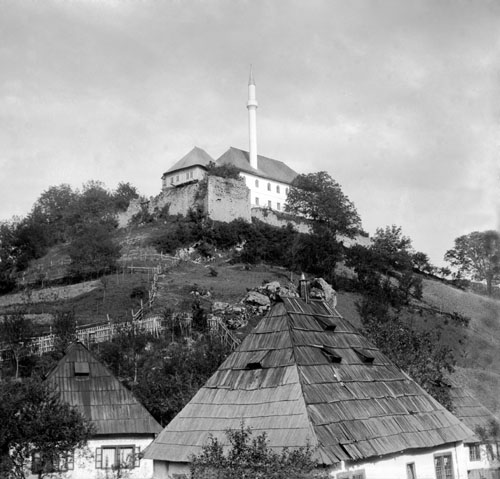
Cazin in 1906

Cazin has several historic places, some dating back to the 14th century. The Ostrožac Castle and Radetina Tower are located in Cazin. During the Middle Ages, the city served as the seat of the Roman Catholic bishop of Knin.

The Cazin uprising of 1950, an armed anti-communist rebellion of peasants, occurred in Cazin and neighboring Velika Kladuša and Slunj, which were all part of the Socialist Federal Republic of Yugoslavia at the time. The peasants revolted against the forced collectivization and collective farms by the Yugoslav government on the farmers of its country.

Following a drought in 1949, the peasants of Yugoslavia were unable to meet unrealistic quotas set by their government and were punished. The revolt that followed the drought resulted in the killings and persecution of those who organized the uprising, but also many innocent civilians. It was the only peasant rebellion in the history of Europe that occurred during the Cold War.

== Settlements ==
Aside from the urban area of Cazin, the city administrative area comprises the following settlements:

- Bajrići
- Brezova Kosa
- Bukovica
- Crnaja
- Čajići
- Čizmići
- Ćehići
- Ćoralići
- Donja Barska
- Donja Koprivna
- Donja Lučka
- Glogovac
- Gornja Barska
- Gornja Koprivna
- Gornja Lučka
- Gradina
- Hadžin Potok
- Kapići
- Kličići
- Kovačevići
- Krakača
- Krivaja
- Liđani
- Liskovac
- Ljubijankići
- Majetići
- Miostrah
- Mujakići
- Mutnik
- Osredak
- Ostrožac
- Ostrožac na Uni
- Pećigrad
- Pivnice
- Pjanići
- Podgredina
- Polje
- Ponjevići
- Prošići
- Rošići
- Rujnica
- Skokovi
- Stijena
- Šturlić
- Šturlićka Platnica
- Toromani
- Tržac
- Tržačka Platnica
- Tržačka Raštela
- Urga
- Vilenjača
- Vrelo
- Zmajevac

== Demographics ==
According to the 2013 census, the municipality of Cazin has a population of 66,149 inhabitants. The town of Cazin has a population of 13,863.

=== Ethnic groups ===
The ethnic composition of the municipality: Here is the table with the columns ordered by year, starting with 2013 on the left:

Ethnic group	Population 2013	Population 1991	Population 1981	Population 1971
Bosniaks/Muslims	63,463	61,693	55,401	43,880
Croats	320	139	122	175
Serbs	29	778	826	1,196
Yugoslavs	-	430	529	51
Others/Unspecified	2,337	369	232	166
Total	66,149	63,409	57,110	45,468

== Twin towns – sister cities ==
Cazin is twinned with:

- Develi, Turkey
- Kahramanmaraş, Turkey

== Gallery ==
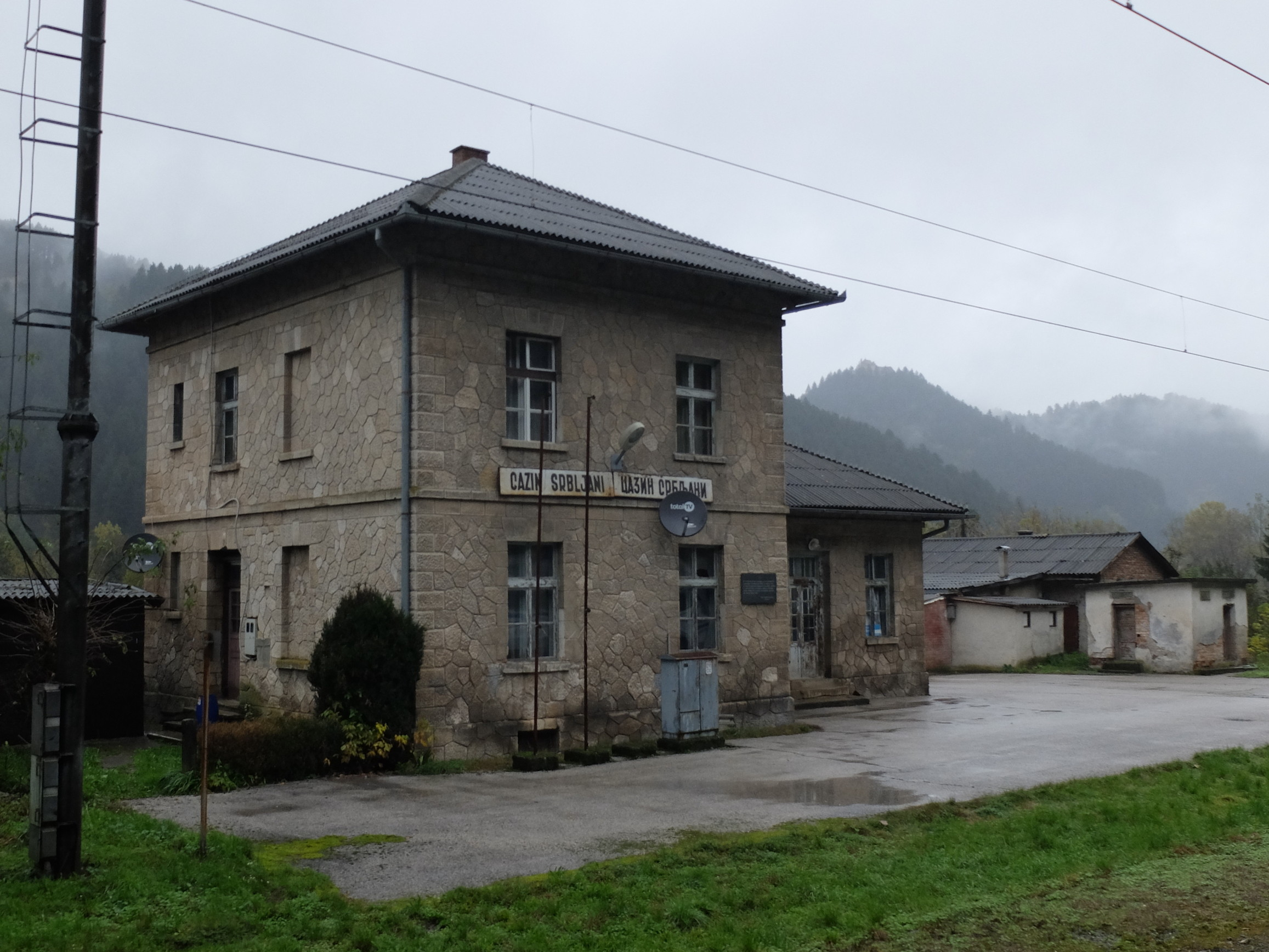
Cazin Srbljani (railway station)

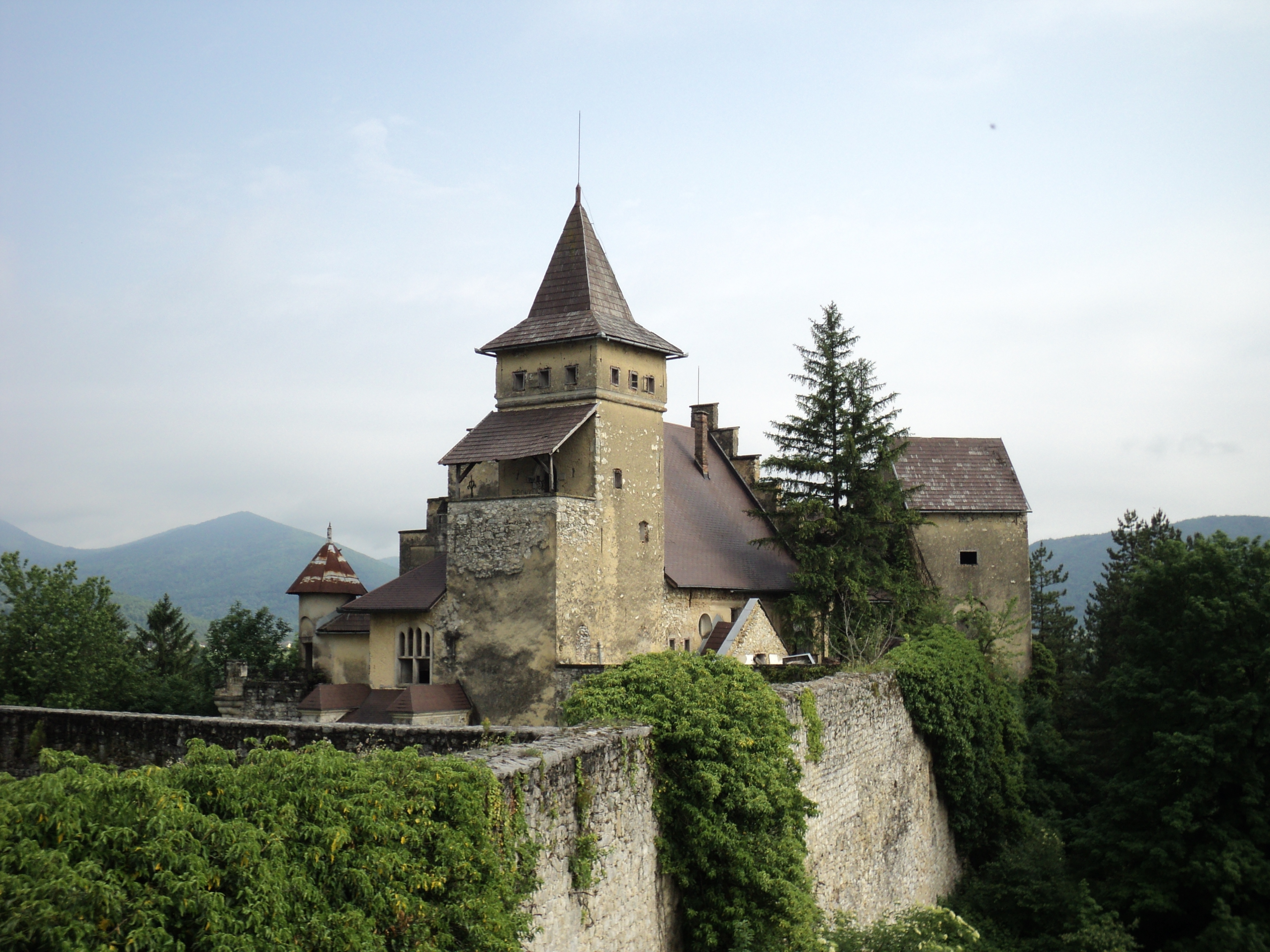
Cazin fortress

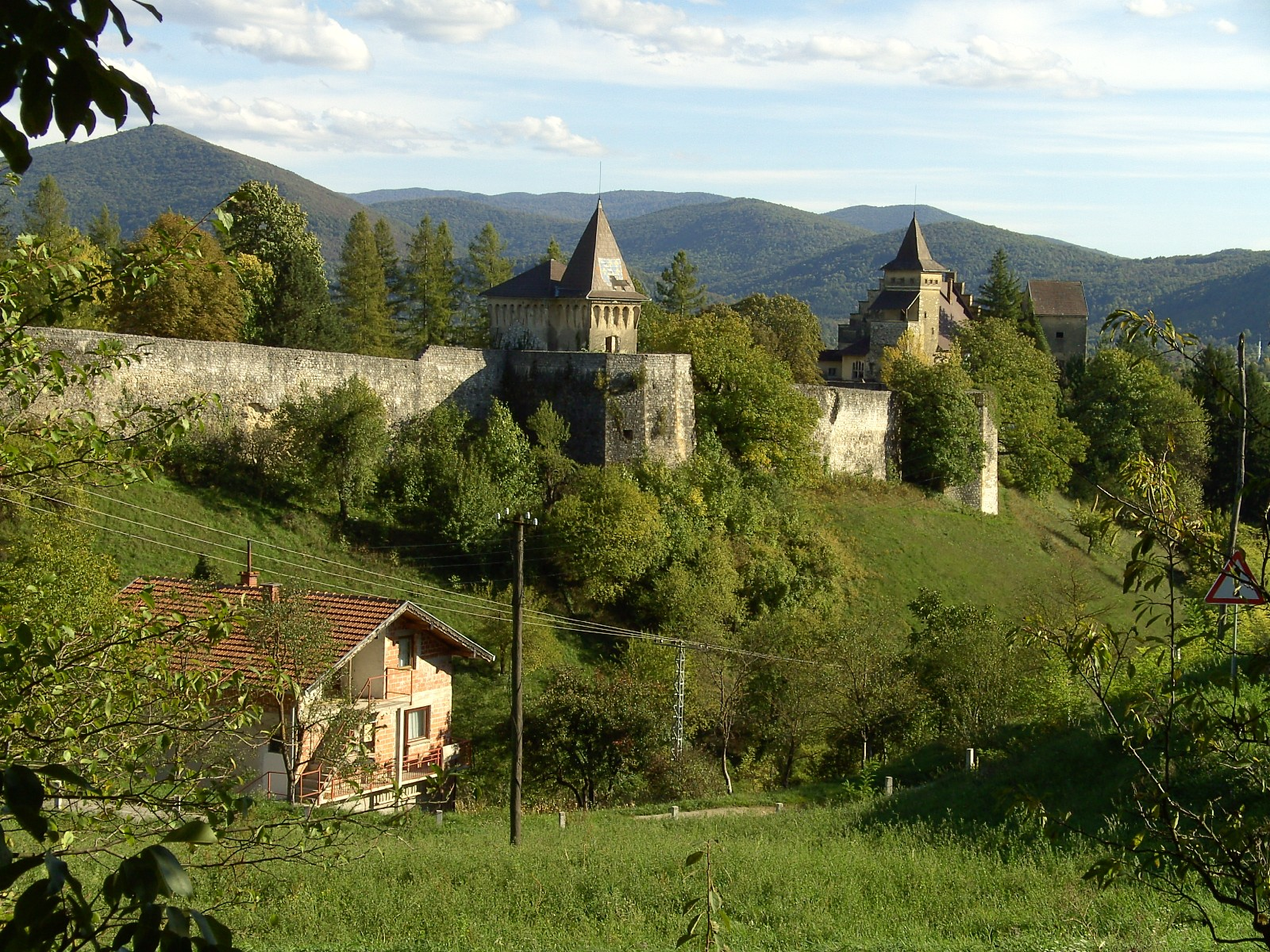
Cazin fortress

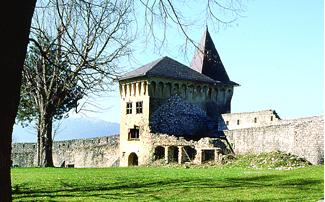
Cazin fortress

== See also ==
- Bosanska Krajina
- Una-Sana Canton
