= Edgar Angeli =

Croatian rear admiral

- Born: 11 May 1892; Karlovac, Croatia-Slavonia, Austria-Hungary
- Died: 17 June 1945 (aged 53); Zagreb, Croatia, Yugoslavia
- Military career
- Allegiance: Austria-Hungary; Kingdom of Yugoslavia; Independent State of Croatia
- Branch: Navy of the Independent State of Croatia
- Service years: 1911–1945
- Rank: Rear Admiral
- Commands: Navy of the Independent State of Croatia
- Conflicts: World War I World War II
- Awards: Order of the Crown of King Zvonimir 3rd Class

Edgar Angeli (11 May 1892 – 17 June 1945) was a Croatian rear admiral who served as the commander of the Navy of the Independent State of Croatia between 1943 and 1944.

== Biography ==
Angeli was born in 1892 in Karlovac, Austria-Hungary. Angeli attended the Imperial and Royal Naval Academy of the Austrian-Hungarian Empire. As a naval officer, he participated in World War I serving in the fleet based in Rijeka.

In 1919, he was assigned to the War Navy of Kingdom of Serbs, Croats and Slovenes, holding the rank of lieutenant commander. He later rose to the rank of Captain while commanding a river fleet, and witnessed the capitulation of Kingdom of Yugoslavia. Because of his connections with Croatian officers who supported the Ustaše and Slavko Kvaternik, he became an officer of the newly formed Navy of the Independent State of Croatia, becoming its deputy commander from 10 April 1941 – 14 April 1943. For these actions, the Yugoslav Government in exile declared him a traitor and deprived him of his former Naval rank.

In the Croatian Navy, he continued to command a river fleet and also commanded a coastal port gendarmerie. He participated in the creation of the Croatian Naval Legion, which served with the Kriegsmarine on the Black Sea and Azov Sea. He also broke the Treaty of Rome, signed by Ante Pavelić and Benito Mussolini, forbidding Croatia from building any sort of naval fleet. For his merits and war records, he was decorated with the Order of the Crown of King Zvonimir 3rd Class, on 13 June 1942 from Poglavnik Ante Pavelić.

On 17 September 1943, he was promoted to the rank of Rear Admiral, becoming a commander of the Croatian Navy.

By 21 April 1944, he requested that he be allowed to retire his commission due to a prolonged illness. In May 1945, he was taken by the British Army to Bleiburg, the town where most of the early Yugoslavian War Crimes trials were held, mainly against Yugoslav Partisans. He was subsequently imprisoned by the Partisans and put on trial. He died at some point in 1945.

== Sources ==
- Bulajić, Milan (1994). The Role of the Vatican in the break-up of the Yugoslav State: The Mission of the Vatican in the Independent State of Croatia. Ustashi Crimes of Genocide. Belgrade: Stručna knjiga.
- Bulajić, Milan (2002). Jasenovac: The Jewish-Serbian Holocaust (the role of the Vatican) in Nazi-Ustasha Croatia (1941–1945). Belgrade: Fund for Genocide Research, Stručna knjiga. ISBN 9788641902211.
