= Croatian Anti-Aircraft Legion =

Croatian Anti-Aircraft unit

- Kroatische FLAK Legion; Hrvatska PZ Legija
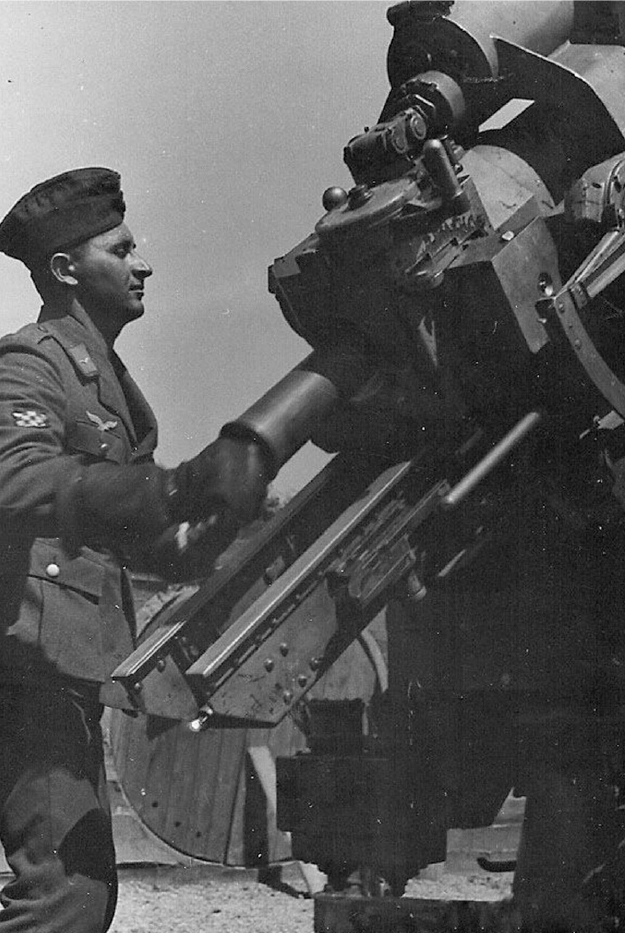
- Croatian legionnaire manning an anti-aircraft (AA) gun
- Active: 1943—1945
- Country: Independent State of Croatia
- Allegiance: Germany
- Branch: Luftwaffe
- Type: Air Defense
- Role: Anti-Aircraft Artillery Heimatflak
- Size: 350 gunners 3,000 support troops
- Part of: Wehrmacht
- Garrison/HQ: Zagreb
- Engagements: World War II

Commanders
- Notable commanders: Bojnik Srnec

Insignia
- Shoulder Sleeve Insignia

The Croatian Anti-Aircraft Legion (Croatian: Hrvatska PZ Legija; German: Kroatische FLAK Legion) was an anti-aircraft (Flak) unit in the service of the German Air Force (Luftwaffe) during World War II. It was composed of Croat volunteers from the Independent State of Croatia (NDH).

== Background ==
Within days of Hitler's invasion of Russia, Croatian fascist Ante Pavelić, leader of the Independent State of Croatia (NDH) issued an appeal for Croats to fight on the side of Nazi Germany and join the volunteer Croatian Legion and its "crusade against Bolshevism", a regiment of infantry, two air units and one naval unit were sent to the Eastern Front. In early 1943 an anti-aircraft (FLAK) unit of the Luftwaffe was formed on the model of the Croatian Air Force Legion. The unit was named Hrvatska PZ Legija and Kroatische FLAK Legion (Croatian Anti-Aircraft Legion). It numbered 350 gunners and about 3,000 support troops, the unit was commanded by Major Bojnik Srnec.

== Operational history ==
After training took place in Germany, the unit was immediately sent to the Eastern Front, in total 350 men. The 350-strong unit led by Major Srnec did not serve long on the Eastern Front. In May 1944, after the fall of Crimea to the Soviet troops, and the destruction of the first Croatian Legion, the 369th (Croatian) Infantry Division, they were then returned to Croatia with the remnants of the Croatian Air Force Legion to defend their homeland that was threatened by Allied air attacks and guerrilla war.

After withdrawing from Crimea and then from Ukraine, personnel were reassigned to various Flak divisions and battalions throughout Western Europe, most of the legion followed 15./JG 52, one of two Croatian air squadrons raised for the Luftwaffe, back to Zagreb where it remained until the end of the war. Another group was assigned to Gem.Flak-Abt. 175 stationed in Mont de Marsan in France, an entirely Croatian unit. Another group was stationed near Münster and Munich. In the territory of NDH Croatia, only one Anti-aircraft unit of the Croatian Flak Legion served: Gem.Flak-Abt. 172 which was stationed near Zemun before being sent to East Prussia. In late 1943 a second group was formed, trained in Germany and France in the vicinity of Auxerre and Bordeaux.

== See also ==
- World War II in Yugoslavia
- Independent State of Croatia
- Croatian Air Force Legion
- Croatian Naval Legion
