= Đuro Jakčin =

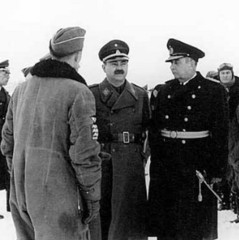
- Mile Budak (center) and Đuro Jakčin (right)
- Born: February 22, 1889; Vienna, Austria-Hungary
- Died: February 16, 1944 (aged 54); Sofia, Kingdom of Bulgaria
- Military career
- Allegiance: Austria-Hungary; Kingdom of Yugoslavia; Independent State of Croatia
- Branch: Austro-Hungarian Navy; Royal Yugoslav Navy; Navy of the Independent State of Croatia
- Service years: 1909–1918; 1918–1921; 1941–1944
- Conflicts: World War I World War II

Đuro Jakčin (22 February 1889 – 16 February 1944) was a Croatian naval officer and first commander of Navy of the Independent State of Croatia.

== Career ==
Jakčin was born in Vienna in 1889. Having graduated from naval academy in 1909, he joined Austro-Hungarian Navy and in November 1914 rose to the rank of ship-of-the-line lieutenant. In 1917 he was given the command of torpedo boat 9. He was retired in February 1919.

Jakčin joined fledgling Royal Yugoslav Navy, but was retired in December 1921 in his old rank.

After the invasion and breakup of Yugoslavia, on 10 April 1941 authorities of Independent State of Croatia gave him the rank of a rear admiral and appointed him commander of naval forces. He remained in that capacity until 17 September 1943. However, during that time he mainly served as military attaché in Berlin because the Rome Treaty of 1941 forbade the Independent State of Croatia to form a navy. As attaché he served until November 1942 when he became a liaison officer with 7th SS Volunteer Mountain Division Prinz Eugen. Jakčin had that duty until September 1943. In September 1943 he was appointed Croatian Ambassador to Bulgaria in Sofia, where he suddenly died in March 1944 of natural causes.

Jakčin is buried in Mirogoj cemetery.
