= Navy of the Independent State of Croatia =

- Ratna Mornarica Nezavisne Države Hrvatske
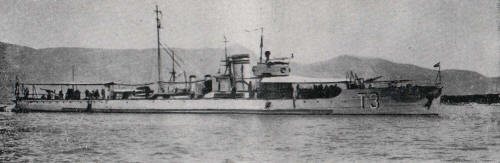
- A 250t-class torpedo boat similar to T7, which was operated by the RMNDH in the Adriatic Sea between September 1943 and June 1944 when she was sunk
- Active: 1941–1944
- Disbanded: May 1945
- Country: Independent State of Croatia
- Type: Navy
- Size: 1,262 personnel (1943)
- Part of: Croatian Armed Forces
- Headquarters: Zagreb, Independent State of Croatia
- Engagements: World War II

Commanders
- Notable commanders: Đuro Jakčin; Edgar Angeli; Nikola Steinfl

Insignia
- Naval Ensign (1941–1944)

- Naval Ensign (1944–1945)

The Navy of the Independent State of Croatia (Croatian: Ratna Mornarica Nezavisne Države Hrvatske, RMNDH) was the navy of the Independent State of Croatia (Croatian: Nezavisna Država Hrvatska, NDH), an Axis puppet state controlled by the fascist Ustaše party. The NDH was created from parts of the Kingdom of Yugoslavia on 10 April 1941, four days after the World War II invasion of Yugoslavia by the Axis powers commenced. The RMNDH consisted of two commands, the Coast and Maritime Traffic Command, and the River and River Traffic Command, and had its headquarters in the NDH capital, Zagreb. The Coast and Maritime Traffic Command consisted of three naval commands along the Adriatic coast, which were each divided into a number of naval districts. The naval districts consisted mainly of naval and weather stations, and were only responsible for coast guard and customs duties. The River and River Traffic Command consisted of seven river stations, a naval infantry battalion, and a River Command Flotilla built around two former Yugoslav river monitors, which had been scuttled during the invasion but subsequently refloated.

The RMNDH was only a small part of the armed forces of the NDH, largely due to restrictions imposed by Italy under the Treaties of Rome. To avoid these limitations, the Germans raised the Croatian Naval Legion which fought as part of the German Navy in the Black Sea campaign between 1941 and 1944. After the Italian capitulation in September 1943, the Germans transferred several captured Italian vessels to the RMNDH, including the light cruiser Dalmacija (renamed Zniam), the former Yugoslav torpedo boat T7, and the Malinska-class mining tender Mosor. All of the significant assets had been lost by December 1944 when the remaining personnel were assigned to duties ashore to circumvent their defection to the Yugoslav Partisans. The RMNDH was disbanded in May 1945 with the collapse and defeat of the NDH.

== Background ==
On 10 April 1941, four days after the invasion of the Kingdom of Yugoslavia by the Axis powers commenced, an extreme Croat nationalist and fascist Ustaše-led puppet state was created. Known as the Independent State of Croatia (often called the NDH, from the Croatian: Nezavisna Država Hrvatska), it combined almost all of modern-day Croatia, all of modern-day Bosnia and Herzegovina and parts of modern-day Serbia into an "Italian-German quasi-protectorate". Germany and Italy quickly agreed on their division of responsibility within the NDH, and effectively occupied the entirety of the country, but the Germans retained the upper hand and control over the most industrially and agriculturally productive parts of the puppet state, despite assuring the Italians that the NDH was in their sphere of influence. The Germans gradually increased their domination over the NDH as time passed, while the Italians were unpopular among the Croat population because they annexed large parts of Croatian territory, including much of the Adriatic coastline. As the weaker Axis partner, Italy was unable to challenge Germany's grip on the NDH, and the Ustaše-led Croats had to accept whatever conditions were imposed on them. By long-standing agreement between the Ustaše leadership and Italy that preceded the outbreak of World War II, if the Croats ceded the Croatian coast to them, the Italians would provide for its protection.

The Royal Yugoslav Navy, targeted heavily by air attacks, conducted few combat operations during the invasion, and the Italians captured most of its ships in port, losing one destroyer scuttled by its crew. One submarine and two motor torpedo boats also escaped to join the Allied cause. The Italians took over the bulk of the remaining seagoing ships and employed them in various roles. One exception was the Yugoslav minelayer Zmaj which sailed to Split in an attempt to join the nascent NDH navy, but was captured at Split by the Italians on 17 April and handed over to the Germans soon after.

== Formation ==
The Navy of the Independent State of Croatia (Croatian: Ratna Mornarica Nezavisne Države Hrvatske, RMNDH) was established by the Law on the Establishment of the Army and Navy issued on the same day as the NDH was established by the Ustaše deputy leader and retired Austro-Hungarian Lieutenant Colonel (later Marshal and Commander-in-chief of the armed forces of the NDH) Slavko Kvaternik, with the approval of the German authorities. The task of the navy, along with the army, was to defend the new state against both foreign and domestic enemies. The Italians opposed the formation of a navy by the NDH, as they considered the Adriatic to be Mare Nostrum (Our Sea). The Germans supported the Italians in this, so the development of the RMNDH along the Adriatic coast was initially very restricted. On 18 May 1941, the Agreement on Military Matters Pertaining to Coastal Areas was signed in Rome – the second of three Treaties of Rome signed that day. In this bilateral treaty with Italy, the NDH agreed to demilitarize the coastal area entirely, restricting itself to civil administration there. It also agreed not to create any naval units in the Adriatic except for policing and customs purposes. By July 1941, the RMNDH consisted of two commands, the Coast and Maritime Traffic Command, and the River and River Traffic Command, and had its headquarters in the NDH capital, Zagreb.

The Coast and Maritime Traffic Command comprised three naval commands for the northern, central and southern sections of the Adriatic coast, headquartered at Crikvenica (later Sušak), Makarska (later Split) and Dubrovnik respectively. These commands were further divided into naval districts; North Adriatic Naval Command was divided into the Kraljevica and Senj Naval Districts, Central Adriatic Naval Command comprised the Omiš, Supertar, Makarska, Metković and Hvar Naval Districts, and South Adriatic Naval Command consisted of the Trpanj, Orebić and Dubrovnik Naval Districts. The naval districts consisted mainly of naval and weather stations, and were only responsible for coast guard and customs duties.

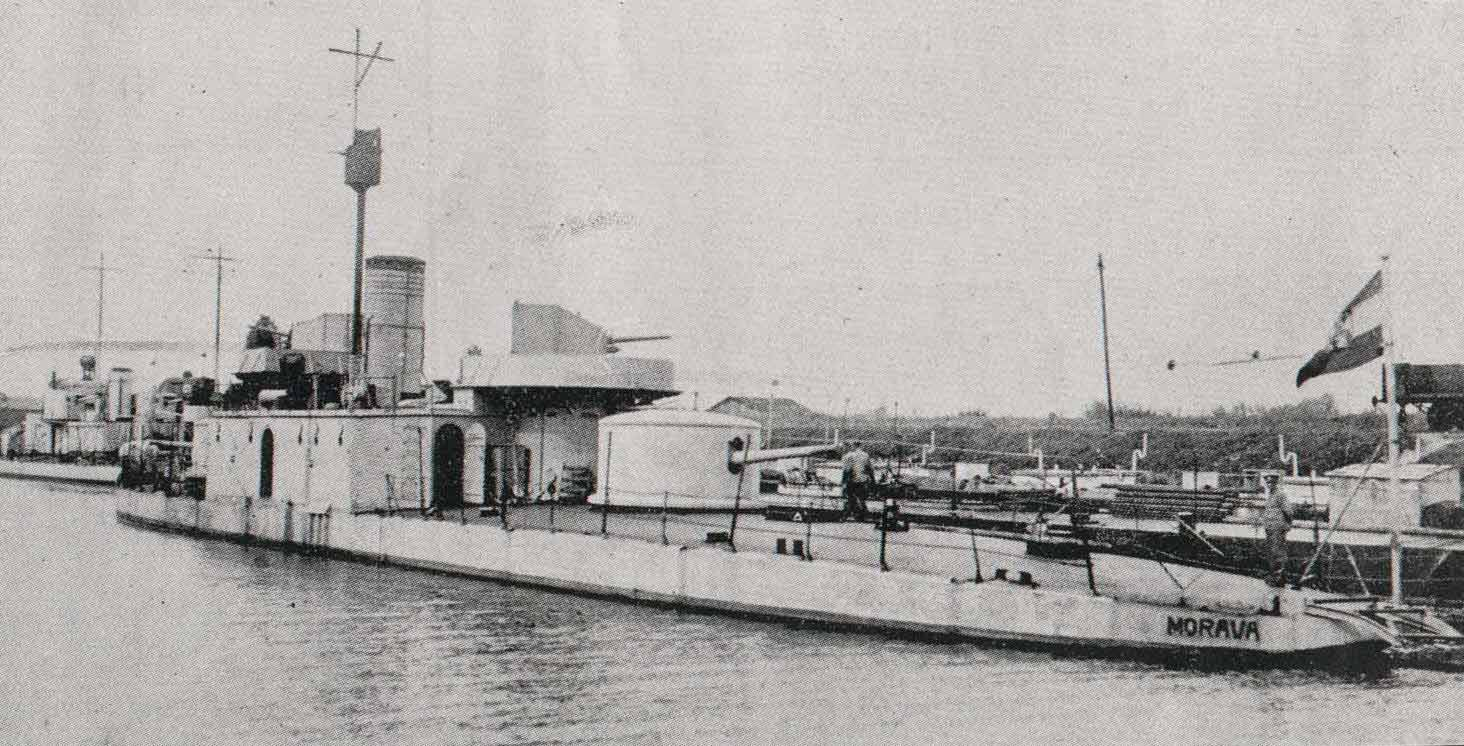
The former Yugoslav monitor Morava was renamed Bosna and was part of the River Command Flotilla

The River and River Traffic Command was headquartered in Sisak, at the confluence of the Kupa, Sava, and Odra rivers about 57 kilometres (35 mi) southeast of Zagreb. It consisted of seven river stations – at Sisak, Brod na Savi, Hrvatska Mitrovica, Zemun, Petrovaradin, Vukovar and Osijek, and a naval infantry battalion based at Zemun (later Zagreb). The River Command Flotilla, headquartered in Zemun, was also part of River and River Traffic Command. It comprised: two former Royal Yugoslav Navy river monitors, Sava and Bosna, which had been scuttled during the invasion and later recovered; two river gunboats, Ustaša and Bosut; two river minelayers, Zagreb and Zrinski; and six motor boats. The flotilla had a flagship, the river tugboat Vrbas, and two patrol groups, each consisting of one monitor, one gunboat, one minelayer and three motor boats.

== Re-organisation ==
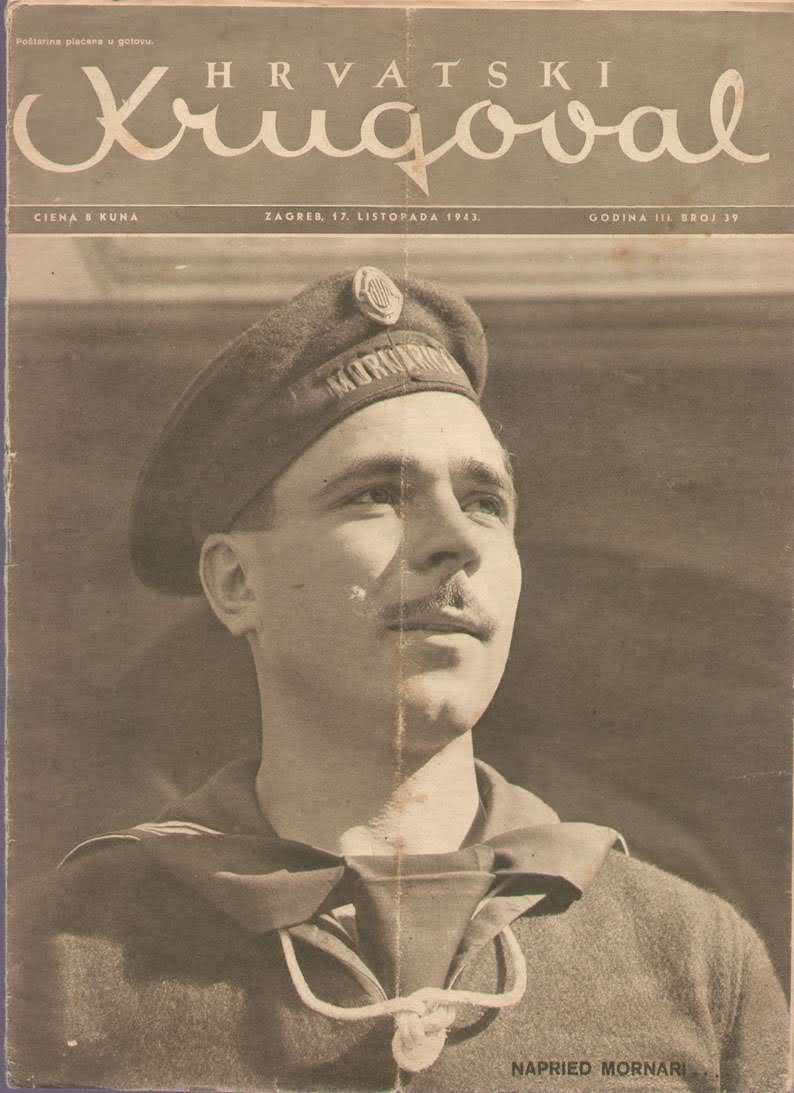
Cover of Hrvatski krugoval magazine from 17 October 1943 featuring a member of the RMNDH.

The Law Decree on the Armed Forces of 18 March 1942 re-organised the RMNDH as a branch of the Croatian Home Guard (Croatian: Domobrani). The RMNDH was always a small part of the armed forces, numbering only 1,262 men in September 1943. After the Italian capitulation in 1943, the Germans recovered the former Yugoslav torpedo boat T7 from the Italians and handed it over to the RMNDH under her Yugoslav designation. Her crew came under the influence of the Yugoslav Partisans, and were preparing to mutiny when the Germans intervened. Two more former Yugoslav vessels were captured from the Italians and handed over to the RMNDH by the Germans; the light cruiser Dalmacija (renamed Zniam), and the Malinska-class mining tender Mosor. Croatian crews also served on German-operated vessels, for example twenty Croats served aboard the minelayer Kiebitz, ex-Italian auxiliary cruiser Ramb III.

Zniam was stranded on 19 December 1943 and was torpedoed by Royal Navy Motor Torpedo Boats (MTBs) two days later. On 24 June 1944, T7 and two German S-boats were sailing between Šibenik and Rijeka, protecting German sea supply routes along the Adriatic, when they were attacked by three Royal Navy MTBs near the island of Kukuljari, south of Murter Island. The MTBs fired two torpedoes at T7, but missed, so they closed and engaged her with their guns, setting her ablaze. She was beached, and 21 crew were rescued by the MTBs. The British crews later examined the wreck, capturing five more crew, then destroyed her with demolition charges. The river monitor Bosna struck a mine and sank in the same month, and Sava was scuttled on 8 September 1944 when her crew deserted to the Partisans. Mosor was stranded on Ist Island near Zadar on 31 December 1944, and remained there until after the end of the war. By this stage, the RMNDH consisted of a flotilla of small coastal craft stationed at Rijeka. The entire flotilla tried to desert to the Partisans in December 1944, but all but one craft (carrying the commander of the flotilla) was prevented from doing so by the Germans. The Germans brought the naval personnel to Zagreb and used them to form a unit for ground combat, and disarmed the remaining vessels. Nevertheless, the RMNDH continued to exist on paper and had a designated commander until it was disbanded at the end of the war.

== Croatian Naval Legion ==
During the war, a unit known as the Croatian Naval Legion (Croatian: Hrvatska pomorska legija) fought as part of the German Navy in the Black Sea campaign under the command of Kapetan korvete (Commander) Andro Vrkljan and later Kapetan fregate (Captain) Stjepan Rumenović. The purpose of posting a naval contingent on the Black Sea was to evade the prohibitions imposed on the RMNDH by the second Treaty of Rome. The Croatian Government hoped that its personnel could gain experience there and later serve as the core of a naval force in the Adriatic. The unit did not have any ships upon its arrival in the Sea of Azov. It managed to scrounge up 47 damaged or abandoned fishing vessels, mostly sailing ships, and hired local Russian and Ukrainian sailors to help man them. They patrolled a coastal sector of the Sea of Azov, and the Legion eventually reached a strength of 1,000 officers and men as the 23rd Minesweeping Flotilla. On 24 September 1942, the Poglavnik (leader) of the NDH, Ante Pavelić, visited Legion headquarters, where he reached an agreement with the Germans to train and equip a flotilla that would undertake anti-submarine patrols. In 1943, a coastal artillery battery was added to the Legion. Following the capitulation of Italy in September 1943, and Axis reverses on the Eastern Front, the Croatian Naval Legion returned to the NDH in May 1944 as a Trieste-based torpedo boat flotilla, part of the German 11th Escort Flotilla. The Germans disbanded the Legion at the same time as the crew of the RMNDH were brought ashore to prevent them from defecting with their vessels to the Partisans.

== Naval commanders ==
Three officers commanded the RMNDH:

- Kontraadmiral (Rear admiral) Đuro Jakčin (1941 – late 1943)
- Kapetan bojnog broda (Commodore) Edgar Angeli (late 1943 – 1944)
- Kontraadmiral Nikola Steinfel (1944 – May 1945)

== See also ==
- Military ranks of the Independent State of Croatia
- Croatian Armed Forces (Independent State of Croatia)
- Croatian Air Force (Independent State of Croatia)
- Croatian Air Force Legion
- Croatian Navy
