= Franjo Džal =

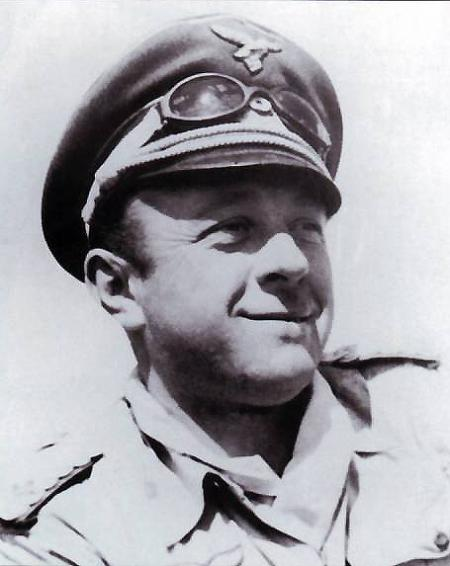
Franjo Džal

Franjo Džal (9 April 1906, in Bihać – September 1945, in Belgrade) was a colonel in the Independent State of Croatia's air force.

He finished elementary school and gymnasium in Bihać and graduated from the Military Academy of Serbia in 1924. Džal initially attended observer school at Petrovaradin in 1927, and then was accepted for pilot training at 1. VP in Novi Sad the following year. He became a fighter pilot, serving with 6. LP in Zemun, (now part of Belgrade) in 1931. He completed his training as a fighter pilot in the Yugoslav Royal Army. He served as a Major in Niš during the April War. He subsequently joined the Air Force of the Independent State of Croatia and was assigned to the Croatian Air Force Legion.

Džal was a member of the 4th Legionnaire Fighter Wing of the Legion and was sent to the Eastern Front in September 1941. Promoted to the rank of Lieutenant-Colonel, he became the first commanding officer of 15(Kroat)/JG 52. From October 1941 to November 1942 he claimed 16 confirmed victories (and 3-5 unconfirmed) over the course of 157 missions. On 28 July he was shot down by Alexander Pokryshkin but bailed out and survived. The wing returned to the Independent State of Croatia on leave in December 1942 and returned to the Eastern Front in February 1943. In November 1943, Džal was made commanding officer of the Croatian Air Force Legion.

He relocated to Croatia for the remainder of the war and held various posts in the country's Air Force command. With the defeat of the state in 1945 he took part in the Independent State of Croatia evacuation to Austria, but was repatriated to Yugoslavia by the Allies. Shortly thereafter, he was arrested by the Communist Yugoslavian government, sentenced to death, and executed in September 1945.
