= Treaty of Rome (disambiguation) =

Treaty of Rome most commonly refers to the 1957 international agreement that led to the founding of the European Economic Community.

Treaty of Rome may also refer to:

- Treaty of Rome (1924), between the Kingdom of Italy and the Kingdom of Yugoslavia, created the Free State of Fiume
- Treaties of Rome (1941), established the borders between the Kingdom of Italy, the Independent State of Croatia, and the Governorate of Dalmatia
- Euratom Treaty (1957), established the European Atomic Energy Community
- Rome Statute of the International Criminal Court (2002), established the ICC
- The Second Treaty of Rome (2004), also known as the Treaty establishing a Constitution for Europe

== See also ==
- Rome Convention (disambiguation)
