= Rome Convention =

The Rome Convention may refer to one of the following conventions:

- Rome Act (1928), a revision of the Berne Convention for the Protection of Literary and Artistic Works
- Rome Convention of 1952 on Damage Caused by Foreign Aircraft to Third Parties on the Surface
- Rome Convention for the Protection of Performers, Producers of Phonograms and Broadcasting Organisations (1961)
- Rome Convention of 1980 on contractual obligations

== See also ==
- Treaty of Rome (disambiguation)
