= Croatian Naval Legion =

Croatian Naval Legion under German command

- Hrvatska Pomorska Legija
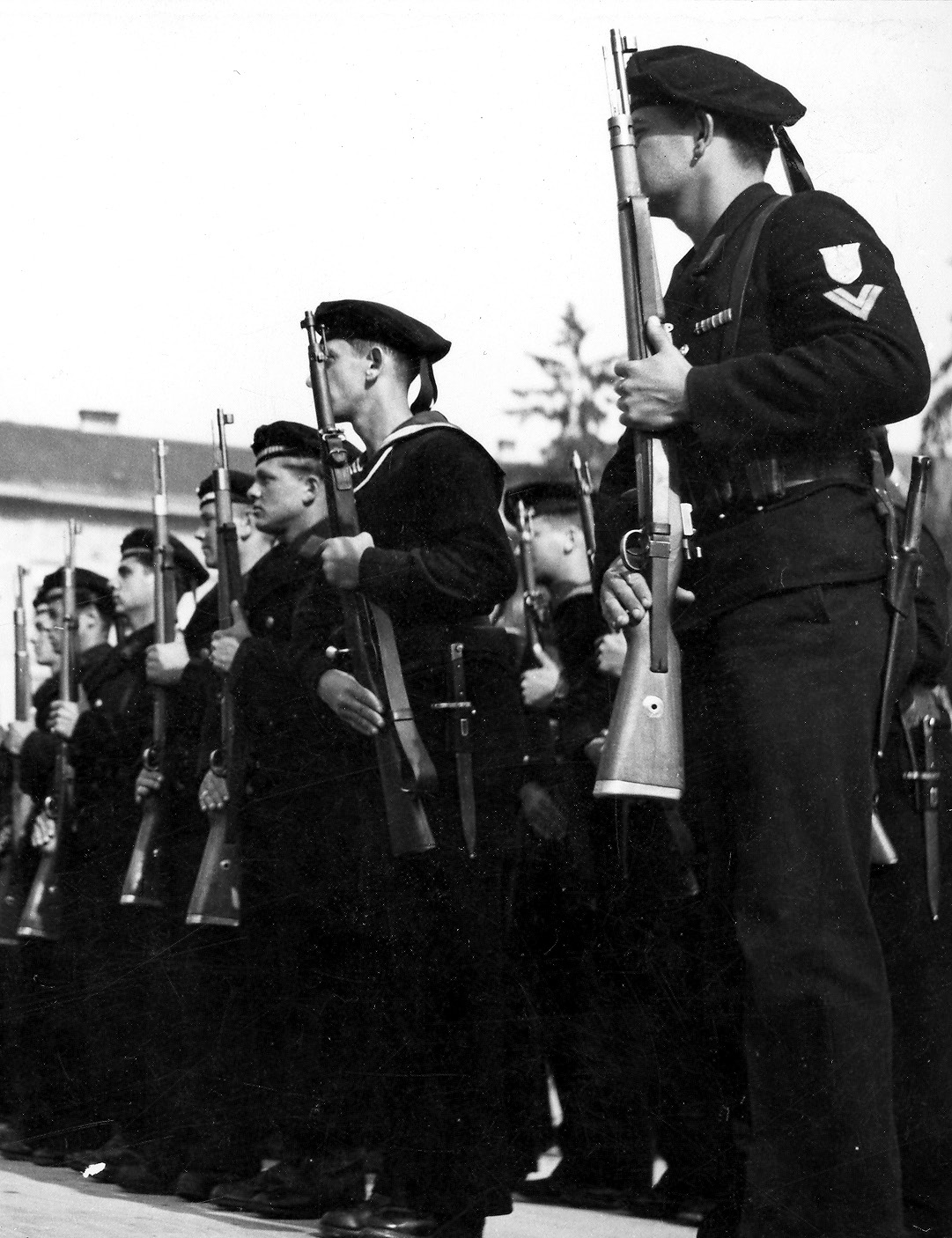
- Croatian Naval Legion on 5 May 1944
- Active: 3 July 1941—21 May 1944
- Country: Independent State of Croatia
- Allegiance: Germany
- Branch: Kriegsmarine
- Type: Navy
- Size: 343 (09/1941); 1,000 men peak in 1943
- Part of: Wehrmacht
- Garrison/HQ: Geniscek, Ukraine (09/1941); Mariupol, Ukraine (05/1942); Trieste, OZAK (1944)
- Engagements: World War II

Commanders
- Notable commanders: Andro Vrkljan

The Croatian Naval Legion (Croatian: Hrvatska pomorska legija) was a contingent of volunteers from the Independent State of Croatia that served with Nazi Germany's navy Kriegsmarine, on the Black Sea and Adriatic Sea during World War II.

== Formation ==
The legion was formed in July 1941, following the German invasion of the Soviet Union on 22 June. It was initially comprised some 350 officers and ratings in German uniform, but this eventually swelled to 900–1,000. Their first commander was Commander Andro Vrkljan, who was commissioned as a Fregattenkapitän (frigate captain) in the German navy. Vrkljan was later replaced by Captain Stjepan Rumenović. The Croats purpose in posting a naval contingent to the Black Sea was to evade the prohibition on an Adriatic navy imposed by the Treaty of Rome (18 May 1941) with Italy. This prohibition effectively limited the Croatian Navy (RMNDH) to a riverine flotilla.

== Operational history ==
The Croatian Naval Legion arrived at Varna in Bulgaria on 17 July 1941. It trained on minesweepers and submarines. On 30 September it was moved to Henichesk in Ukraine, where it was activated as the 23rd Minesweeper Flotilla (23. Minensuchflottille). The unit did not have any ships upon its arrival in the Sea of Azov. It managed to scrounge up 47 damaged or abandoned fishing vessels, mostly sailing ships, and to man them with hired local Russian and Ukrainian sailors, many of them deserters from the Soviet Red Navy. Over the winter of 1941–42, the legionnaires dug trenches and fought as infantry in defence of the town. They only put to sea in April 1942. In May 1942 while placing mines around the harbour entrance 25 Croatians were killed and 2 boats destroyed.

The legion patrolled a coastal sector of the Sea of Azov. On 24 September 1942, the Poglavnik Ante Pavelić visited the naval headquarters, where he reached an agreement with German authorities to train and equip a submarine chaser flotilla the Legion became Unterseebootsjäger-Flotille 23.

At the end of 1942, the legion returned to Croatia to recuperate, and in the new year returned to Varna. In 1943, the legion was expanded with a Croatian volunteer coastal artillery unit, bringing the total manpower to more than 1,000 men. With the capitulation of Italy in September 1943, there was no impediment to a Croatian navy on the Adriatic Sea anymore. The Croatian Naval Legion returned to Zagreb on 21 May 1944. It was then posted to Trieste, where it operated as a torpedo-boat flotilla Schnellboot under the German 11th Escort Flotilla (11. Sicherungsdivision), it was disbanded in December 1944.

== Aftermath ==
Its crews were incorporated into the Navy of the Independent State of Croatia. The coastal artillery batteries remained stationed in Split as part of the Kriegsmarine, from February 1944.

== See also ==
- World War II in Yugoslavia
- Navy of the Independent State of Croatia
- Croatian Legion
- Croatian Air Force Legion
