= Croatian Air Force Legion =

- Hrvatska Zrakoplovna Legija
- Badge of Croatian Air Force Legion
- Active: 12 July 1941 – 21 July 1944
- Country: Independent State of Croatia
- Allegiance: Germany
- Type: Air force
- Role: Aerial warfare
- Part of: Jagdgeschwader 52; Kampfgeschwader 3 Kampfgeschwader 53
- Engagements: World War II: Eastern Front

Commanders
- Notable commanders: Col Ivan Mrak

Insignia
- Fuselage

- Roundel

- Fin flash

Aircraft flown
- Bomber: Dornier Do 17; CANT Z.1007; Fiat BR.20
- Fighter: Bf 109E (until 1942); Bf 109G-2; Bf 109G-4; Bf 109G-6; Macchi C.200; Macchi C.202; Macchi C.205; Fiat CR.42 Falco

The Croatian Air Force Legion (Croatian: Hrvatska Zrakoplovna Legija), or HZL, was a unit of the Luftwaffe, composed entirely of volunteers drawn from the Nazi puppet-state, the Independent State of Croatia. Many of them had previously served in the Royal Yugoslav Air Force in April 1941 during the Nazi Invasion of Yugoslavia.

The legion fought on the Eastern Front between 1941–1943 during the Second World War. The unit was sent to Germany for training on 15 July 1941, the fighter group to Fürth near Nuremberg and the bomber group to Greifswald, before heading to the Eastern Front. Some of them also had experience in the two main types that they would operate, the Messerschmitt Bf 109 and Dornier Do 17, with two fighter pilots having actually shot down Luftwaffe aircraft.

The Legion's first commander was Obertsleutnant Ivan Mrak. During operations over the Eastern Front, the unit's fighters scored a total of 283 kills while its bombers participated in 1,332 combat missions. It was disbanded on 21 July 1944 and transformed into the Croatian Air Force Training Group. It was then absorbed by the Air Force of the Independent State of Croatia and its surviving members fought back on Croatian soil. The legion had approximately 360 officers, NCOs and men.

== Organization ==
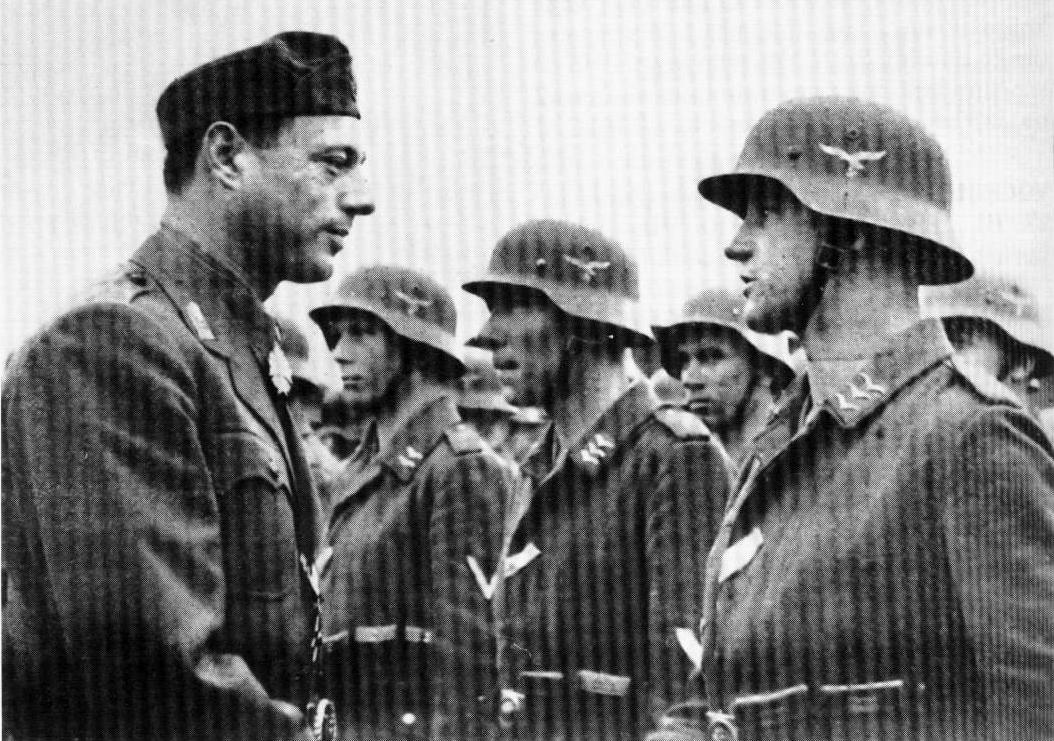
Croatian Minister of Armed Forces Ante Vokić visits the volunteers in Stockerau in 1944

The Legion was organized into a fighter wing and a bomber wing:

- 4. Fighter Wing – ZLS (Zrakoplovna Lovacka Skupina) Major Franjo Dzal
  - 10. Fighter Squadron
  - 11. Fighter Squadron

The 4. Fighter Wing was attached to the Jagdgeschwader 52. It originally served as part of the III./JG 52, while later it became known as the 15(Kroat.)/JG52. It was led by Franjo Džal.

- 5. Bomber Wing – (Bombaska Skupina) Major Vladimir Graovac
  - 12. Bomber Squadron
  - 13. Bomber Squadron

The 5. Bomber Wing was originally attached to Kampfgeschwader 3 as part of the 10/KG3 and later as the 15.(Kroat.)/KG 3.

== Eastern Front ==
=== Fighter operations ===
One squadron of the Fighter Wing was sent to the area of Furth, Germany, for training, the other to Herzogenaurach Airfield, nearby. Training commenced on July 19, 1941, on Arado Ar 96 and Messerschmitt Bf 109D aircraft, and lasted to the end of September 1941 at which time the Legionnaires were deemed ready for the Eastern Front and were equipped with various models of the Messerschmitt Bf 109 fighter. During the course of their training, the men had been issued Luftwaffe uniforms adorned with the Croatian armshield and the Croatian Airforce Legion badge on the right breast pocket.

The Squadron received the official designation 15.(Kroatische)/JG 52, and arrived at its first Eastern Front airfield on October 6, 1941, near Poltava. On 9 October 1941, the Squadron had its Soviet R10 shot down in the Ahtijevka-Krasnograd area. The kill was given to the German liaison pilot to the Squadron, Lt. Baumgarten. The Squadron was transferred at the end of October 1941 to Taganrog, and stayed in this area till 1 December 1941. The first kill by a Croatian pilot occurred in this time period by Captain Ferencina, and the second by Lt. Colonel Dzal.

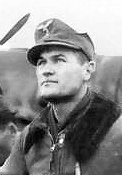
Croatian Pilot Capt. Mato Dukovac (Staffelkapitän of 15/JG52 from October 1943) is the top-scoring Ace with 44 confirmed and 1 probable.

On 1 December 1941, the Squadron transferred to Marinpol. Attacks were made on Soviet armoured columns around Pokorovskoje, Matvejeva, Kurgan, Jeiska and Uspenskoje, and on the railway line Marinpol-Stalino. As well, the Squadron escorted German bombers on their missions. By the end of January 1942, the Squadron had shot down 23 Soviet airplanes (of this, four were MIG-3 fighters). At the end of March 1942, the Squadron received a telegrams from the Commander of 4.Fliegerkorp, General Flugbeil, and the Commander of 4.Luftflotte, Colonel-General Lohr, congratulating them on their successes. In April 1942, the Squadron flew escort missions for Stuka bombers, guarded the Marinpol airfield, and strafed Soviet troops in the Azov Sea area. Nine more Soviet airplanes were shot down in this period.

In May, the Squadron was transferred first to the Crimea, and shortly thereafter, to the Artemovka-Konstantinovka region. From this base of operation, the Squadron flew escort missions for bombers attacking Sevastopol and patrolled the Azov Sea area. Four more Soviet planes were downed, and a Soviet patrol boat was also sunk. From the end of May, till 21 June 1942 (the date of the Squadron's 1,000 flight), 21 more Soviet planes were shot down. From this date till the end of July 1942, 69 more aircraft are shot down.

At the end of 1942 the unit was given a three-month rest, returning to Nikolayev on 21 February 1943. Although the unit continued to score kills, there was a spate of defections from 15./JG 52, with pilots flying to Soviet airfields. The remaining pilots were questioned by the Luftwaffe, the Staffel was withdrawn from the front, and the commander of the HZL was replaced. This was the end of the second tour of 15./JG 52 on the Eastern Front. The Luftwaffe decided to replace most of the remaining pilots of 15./JG 52 with newly trained men, and several veterans of the Staffel joined them during their fighter training at Fürth. Twelve graduated on 1 October 1943 and they arrived with two other pilots at Nikolayev on 21 October 1943, where they were equipped with eight Bf 109G-4s and G-6s. They deployed to their airfield at Bagerovo and commenced combat missions on 26 October. By late 1943, the Squadron had tallied 283 kills, and had 14 pilots who had gained flying ace status.

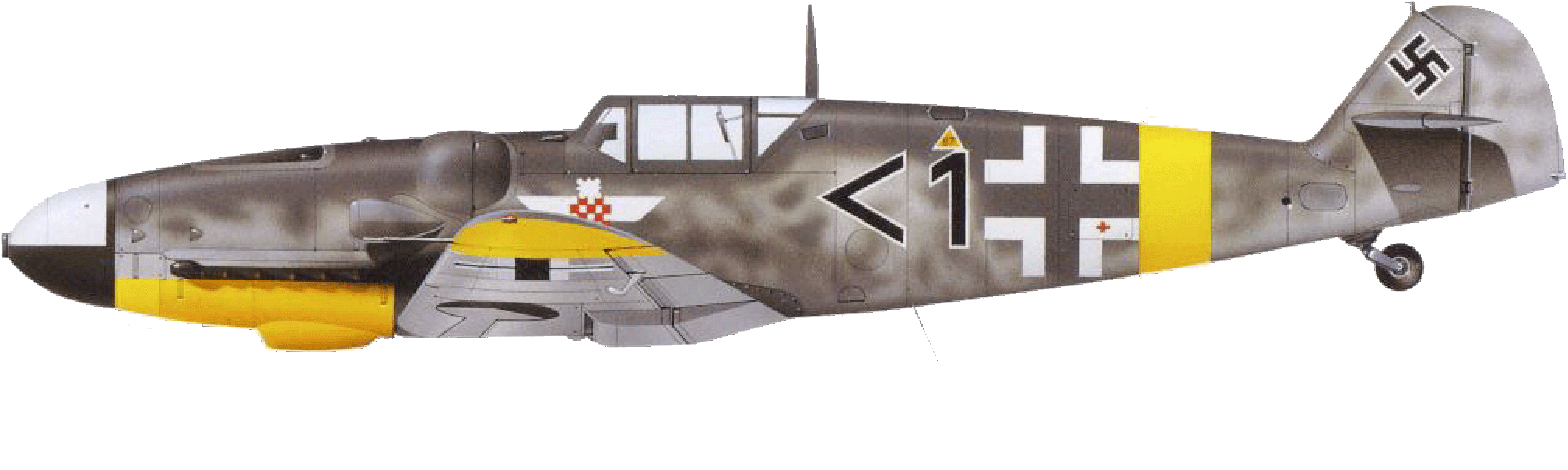
The Messerschmitt Bf 109 of Croatian pilot Mato Dukovac.

The Squadron continued with its fine performances until March 1944 when the Luftwaffe decided that attempting to maintain 15./JG 52 was futile, and the men were sent home to the NDH to help to combat the increasing air activity over the Balkans by the Allies. During its three tours, the Staffel had accounted for a total of 297 Soviet aircraft when it was re-deployed to Croatia.

At least part of the unit returned to the Eastern Front when, at the beginning of July, the Luftwaffe reconsidered its decision. They were transported to Romania and then the Slovak Republic, but no aircraft were provided, and on 21 July the pilots were advised that the HZL was to be disbanded. Despite this, in August they were moved to an airfield in East Prussia, where they took delivery of ten Bf 109G-14s. At the beginning of September they flew to Lithuania in preparation to rejoin the fray, but the defection of squadron leader Mato Dukovac led to the cessation of Croat aerial operations on the Eastern Front.

=== Bomber operations ===
Officially designated 15.(Kroatische)/KG 53, the bomber squadron was equipped with Dornier Do 17Z aircraft. It arrived on the Eastern Front on 25 October 1941, after training at the Grosse Kampfflieger Schule 3, in Greifswald, Germany. Their first area of operations was near Vitebsk. The rest of the Bomber Squadron's assignments were in the Northern Sector of the Eastern Front, including the bombing of Leningrad and Moscow. On 9 November 1941, the Squadron was congratulated by Fieldmarshall Kesselring for its actions thus far. After flying some 1,500 sorties on the Eastern Front, the Squadron and its aircraft were re-deployed to Croatia in December 1942, to help combat the growing Partisan threat to the Axis forces in occupied Yugoslavia.

== Croatia ==
=== Fighter operations ===
In early 1944, the squadron was redesignated 1./(Kroat.)JG, but remained in the Crimea on the Eastern Front. Around the same time two new units were formed to defend the airspace over Croatia. The crews for 2. u. 3. Staffel were drawn from Croatian pilots who had recently completed an A/B course at a German flight school in Bohemia followed by a Bf 109 fighter school in France. They returned to Croatia in early January 1944 and were assigned to Velika Gorica where the two Staffeln were to be formed. Plans to outfit the Staffeln with Bf 109s were canceled, and at the end of January the pilots of the 2. Staffel (2./(Kroat.)JG) went to Italy to collect around a dozen Macchi C.202s and Fiat G.50s. The 3. Staffel was an operational training squadron, also known as 3./(Kroat.)JG and equipped with Macchi C.200 and Fiat CR.42 Falco fighters. All these aircraft retained their Luftwaffe markings whilst in service with the unit.

After a period of operational conversion, the squadrons commenced operations against the frequent incursions over Croatia by USAAF and RAF aircraft. By April 1944, 1./(Kroat.)JG had been withdrawn from the Eastern Front and its crew returned to NDH. During a period of intensive activity over the summer of 1944, the squadrons claimed some 20 Allied aircraft shot down, while at the same time receiving further Macchi C.202s, as well as several brand new Macchi C.205s.

By the end of 1944 the squadrons had handed in their remaining worn-out Macchis for brand new German Messerschmitt Bf 109G & K fighters. Over 50 Messerschmitts were delivered to the squadrons and the Air Force of the Independent State of Croatia, with the final delivery taking place on 23 April 1945.

=== Bomber operations ===
Upon its return, the Legion's bomber squadron was redesignated 1./(Kroat.)KG after having flown its nine Dornier Do 17Z bombers from Russia back to Croatia. The Dorniers proved a welcome addition to the strike power of the Axis forces fighting the Partisans in occupied Yugoslavia right up to the end of July 1944, when it was incorporated into the ZNDH. In late 1943, a second squadron, 2./(Kroat.)KG was formed to provide operational training. It was equipped with Italian designed and built CANT Z.1007 and Fiat BR.20 bombers.

== See also ==
- Air Force of the Independent State of Croatia
- Croatian Legion
- Croatian Naval Legion
- Independent State of Croatia during World War II
- World War II in Yugoslavia
- Royal Yugoslav Air Force
