= Treaties of Rome (1941) =

1941 treaty between Italy and Croatia

- Type: Treaties on borders, military, foreign policy and economic cooperation
- Context: Partition of territory following Axis Invasion of Yugoslavia and establishment of the Independent State of Croatia
- Signed: 18 May 1941
- Location: Rome, Italy
- Expiry: 10 September 1943
- Negotiators: (Kingdom of Italy) Benito Mussolini; (Kingdom of Italy) Galeazzo Ciano; (Kingdom of Italy) Raffaele Casertano; (Independent State of Croatia) Ante Pavelić
- Signatories: (Kingdom of Italy) Benito Mussolini; (Independent State of Croatia) Ante Pavelić
- Parties: Kingdom of Italy; Independent State of Croatia

The 1941 Treaties of Rome were a series of treaties concluded by the Kingdom of Italy and the collaborationist Independent State of Croatia (Nezavisna Država Hrvatska, NDH) on 18 May 1941, following the Axis Invasion of Yugoslavia during World War II. The treaties determined the borders between the NDH and Italy, effectively ceding territory largely organised as the Governorate of Dalmatia to the latter. They also prohibited the NDH from deploying naval forces to the Adriatic Sea, and restricted movement of its troops in the Italian-controlled part of the NDH.

Other provisions of the treaties largely subordinated the NDH to Italian interests in matters of defence, foreign policy and economy, and effectively placed the NDH in the position of a quasi-protectorate, obliging the NDH to conclude further treaties required by Italy. Finally, the treaties established that the NDH's Ustaše regime, led by Ante Pavelić, would offer the position of the King of Croatia to a member of the House of Savoy, as appointed by Victor Emmanuel III. The treaties were repealed by Pavelić in 1943, following the surrender of Italy.

The treaties, and further agreements based upon them, created resentment by the Croats, regardless of their position towards the regime, and contributed to an increasingly successful uprising against Axis occupation led by the Yugoslav Partisans. The security arrangements in the Italian zones of occupation within the NDH required the Italians to use the Chetniks as auxiliaries in the anti-guerrilla warfare, as they left large areas of land without permanent garrisons. This policy facilitated the Partisans' withdrawal after defeats in Montenegro and eastern Bosnia and Herzegovina, and establishment of the Bihać Republic in November 1942.

== Background ==
=== Plans to break up Yugoslavia ===
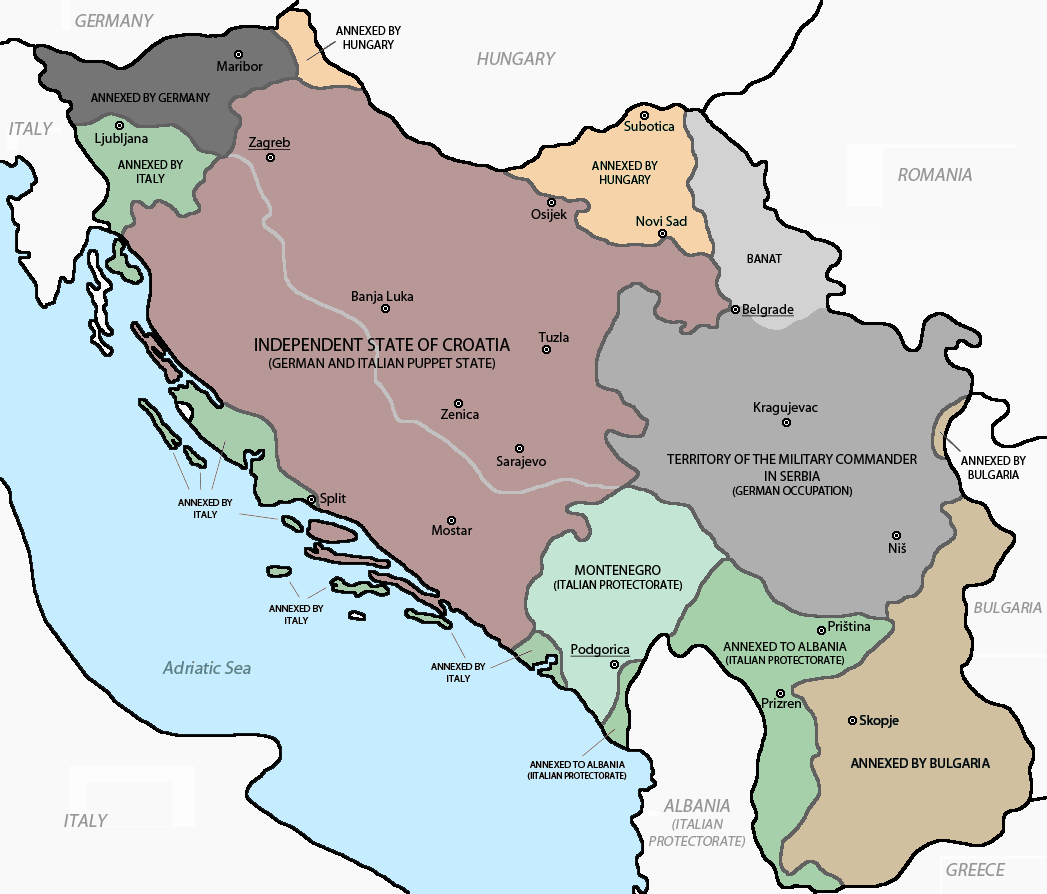
Partition of Yugoslavia following Axis Invasion in April 1941.

Seeking retribution for their withdrawal from the Tripartite Pact following the Yugoslav coup d'état of March 1941, Adolf Hitler sought to politically destroy the Kingdom of Yugoslavia through dismemberment. The move was supported by Italian leader Benito Mussolini, who believed that such fragmentation would make it easier for Fascist Italy to expand their territory by absorbing former Yugoslav territories. In particular, Mussolini desired the southwest parts of the Slovene Lands, as well as unspecified regions of Dalmatia and elsewhere along the eastern Adriatic coast.

Within the Operation 25, German plans for the breakup of Yugoslavia involved the territorial expansion of Nazi Germany; rewards for the German allies of Italy, Hungary, and Bulgaria; and political promises to the Croats, designed to exploit Croatian dissatisfaction with the Yugoslav regime. Initially, the plans called for special political treatment and subsequent autonomy for Croatia. Hitler offered Hungary the opportunity to absorb Croatia on 27 March 1941, apparently referring to the territories largely corresponding with the former Kingdom of Croatia-Slavonia. Bosnia and Herzegovina, on the other hand, as well as Dalmatia and Montenegro, were to be left to Italian control. On 29 March, however, Regent Miklós Horthy declined the offer, and Germany turned to the idea of establishing a Croatian state two days later.

=== Setting up a Croatian state ===
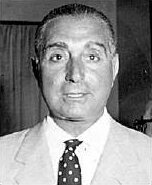
Filippo Anfuso intercepted Ante Pavelić in Karlovac to extract written support for Italian claims.

Germany turned to the Croatian Peasant Party, the most popular Croatian political party at the time, to set up an independent state. They offered the party's leader, Vladko Maček, the opportunity to govern such a state, but Maček declined. In response, the position was reluctantly offered to the Italian-based Ustaše and their leader Ante Pavelić, who Germany feared was an Italian agent. Mussolini, meanwhile, sought to capitalise on the promises made in a 1927 memorandum submitted by Pavelić and Ivo Frank, which not only promised Italian political, economic, and military dominance in the Adriatic region, but also promised to cede to Italy the Bay of Kotor and parts of Dalmatia that were of strategic importance to Italy. All that was asked in return was Italian support to the Croatian struggle against Yugoslavia. Mussolini feared, however, that these Italian interests were in jeopardy, as Pavelić had only privately told Mussolini that Italian claims against the eastern Adriatic coast would be supported by an Ustaše-led regime. At the time, Pavelić had been avoiding making any written comments that he feared would make him appear traitorous, and the Italians deemed the 1927 memorandum insufficiently formal.

Axis forces invaded Yugoslavia on 6 April 1941 and, as Maček rebuffed a renewed push by Germans to rule a Croatian satellite state, the Independent State of Croatia (Nezavisna Država Hrvatska, NDH) was declared on 10 April, as the Wehrmacht was approaching the capital of Zagreb. The declaration was made by Slavko Kvaternik on the urging of, and with support from, SS Colonel Edmund Veesenmayer, attached to the Dienststelle Ribbentrop.

The following day, Pavelić and the Italian-based Ustaše were gathered in Pistoia. Before departing by train to Trieste and then by road towards Zagreb, they were issued Italian uniforms, buses, cars, and light arms. When they reached Karlovac on 14 April, however, Mussolini dispatched Filippo Anfuso by plane to intercept Pavelić and obtain a written, public confirmation that he would recognise Italian claims in Dalmatia. Pavelić complied, and Anfuso left him to proceed, reaching Zagreb in the early morning of 15 April with 195 Ustašas in tow. Yugoslavia surrendered shortly thereafter, on 17 April 1941.

=== Italian and German control ===
At the outset, Pavelić assumed that the NDH would be within the Italian sphere of influence, and Italy saw the NDH as dependent on them. By 22 April, Germany posted Edmund Glaise-Horstenau as plenipotentiary general of the NDH, and Siegfried Kasche as its envoy, while Italy dispatched Raffaele Casertano as its special representative to Zagreb. The German Foreign Ministry told Kasche to expect Italians and NDH authorities to clash over a variety of issues, and instructed him to take a hands-off approach when possible, while supporting Italians at all times.

Meanwhile, Hitler reversed his initial decision to leave Bosnia and Herzegovina to Italy, and foreign ministers Joachim von Ribbentrop and Galeazzo Ciano met in Vienna on 21–22 April to establish a demarcation line, splitting the NDH approximately down the middle from northwest to southeast. This Vienna Line separated the German occupation zone of the north from the Italian to the south, and was effectively set to secure German control over sources of raw materials and lines of communication between Austria and Greece. This decision was also a reversal of the promise to have German troops leave the NDH as soon as possible.

== Provisions ==
=== Negotiations ===
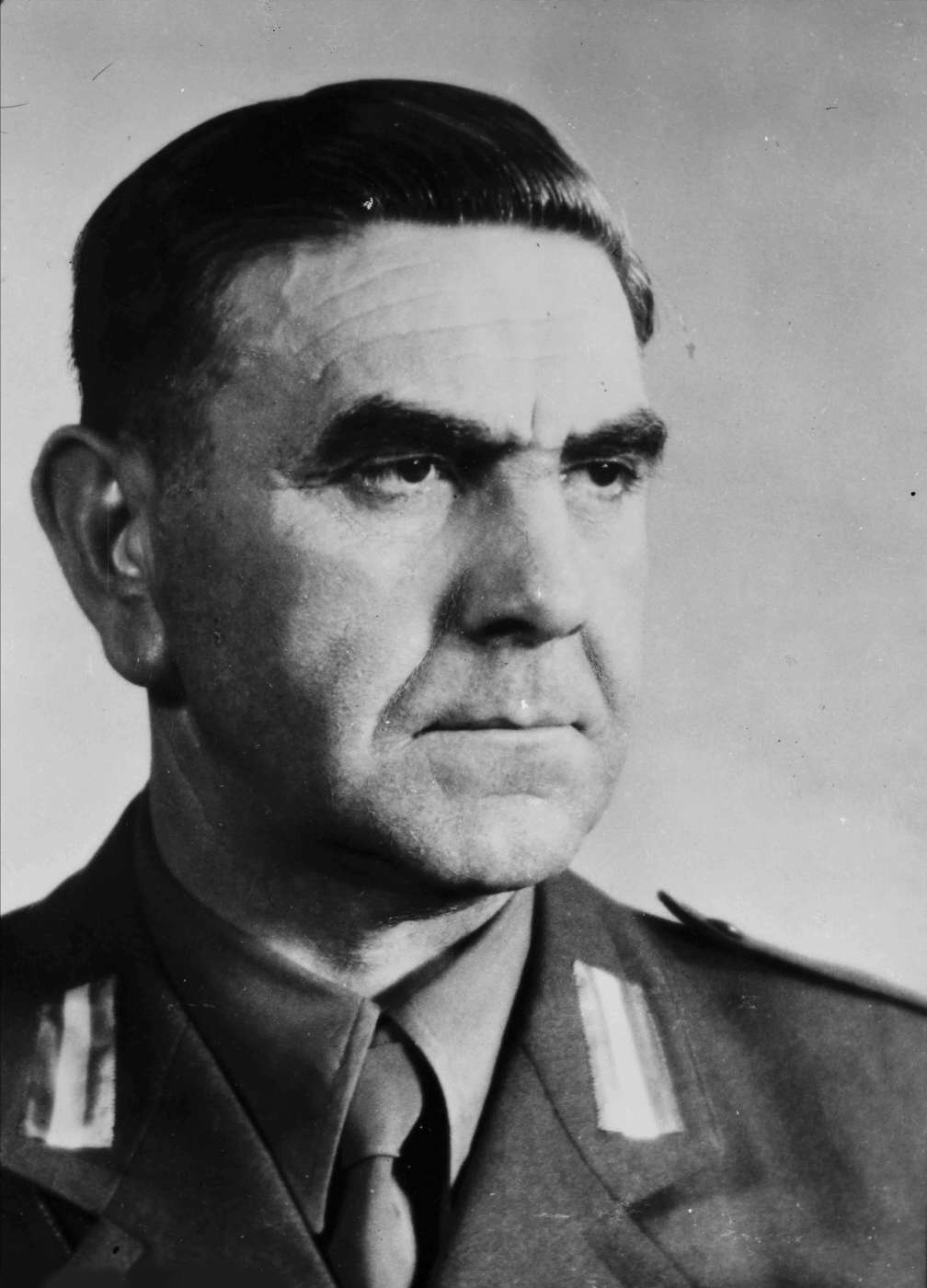
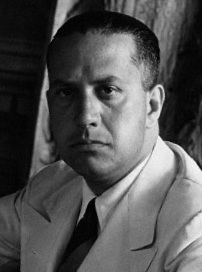
Ante Pavelić and Galeazzo Ciano led the first round of negotiations on the 1941 treaties concluded by the NDH and Italy.

Pavelić and Ciano held the first round of negotiations to determine borders between the NDH and Italy in Ljubljana on 25 April. Ciano initially claimed a strip of land along the entire Adriatic coast, linking the Slovene Lands and Montenegro. When Pavelić complained that this would cost him his position, Ciano put forward another proposal, this time largely constrained to the former Kingdom of Dalmatia, accompanied by a treaty legally attaching the NDH to Italy on a military, political and economic basis. Pavelić asked Ciano to leave Split, Dubrovnik and several Adriatic islands to the NDH, and to avoid establishment of a customs union. The following day, Mussolini agreed with Pavelić’s request, except in relation to Split. Ciano concurred, considering it more useful to closely tie the NDH to Italy than to outright annex a large territory containing a hostile population.

The second round of negotiations took place in Zagreb between Pavelić and Casertano, and produced an agreement on 29 April to appoint a prince of the House of Savoy as the king of Croatia. Casertano was instructed to insist on Italian possession of Split, but only if it did not endanger the successful conclusion of the treaties. Pavelić, however, only requested certain guarantees regarding city administration, and did not insist on keeping the city within the NDH. Pavelić met Mussolini and Ciano on 7 May in Monfalcone, where Ciano insisted on adding his father's birthplace of Bakar to Italy, and on acquisition of the island of Korčula. It was specifically provided that the NDH authorities would facilitate the opening of schools and the use of the Italian language in coastal areas under NDH control, while Italy promised to enter into further agreements with the NDH on administration of the city of Split and the island of Korčula. The latter stipulation was never pursued further. Otherwise, earlier agreements were confirmed, and it was determined that the signing of the treaties would take place in Rome on 18 May. No ratification process was foreseen.

=== Italian–Croatian Treaty on Frontiers ===
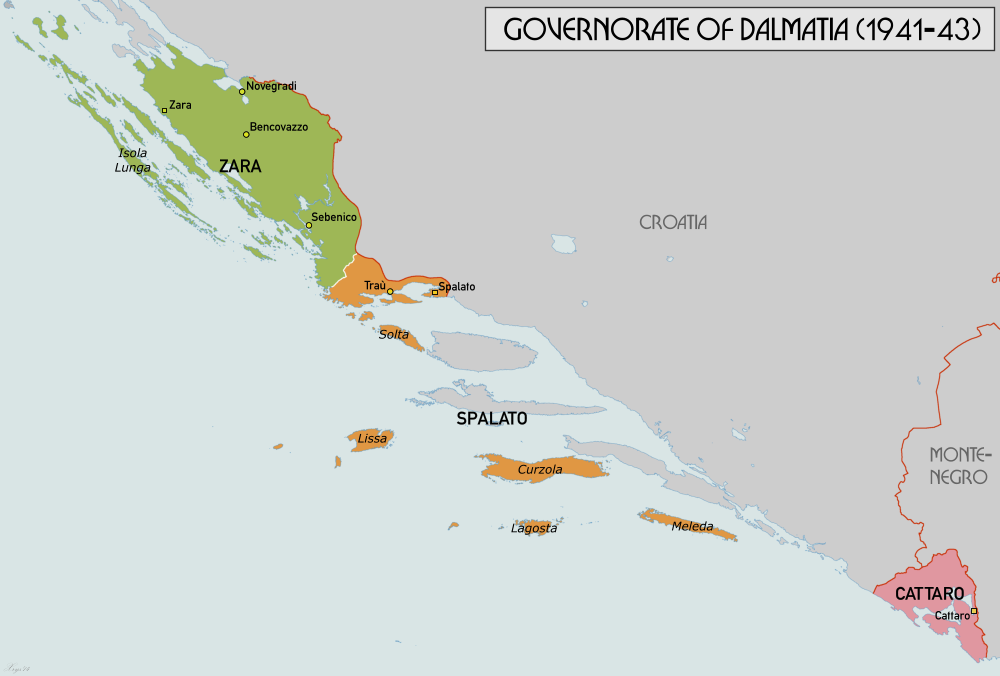
Bulk of the land ceded to Italy became the Governorate of Dalmatia.

The Italian–Croatian Treaty on Frontiers defined the bulk of the border between the NDH and Italy. It provided for Italian annexation of 5,380 square kilometres (2,080 sq mi) of territory, which was home to 380,000 people. It included Dalmatian hinterland of the city of Zadar, as well as the cities of Split and Šibenik, most Adriatic islands and a strip of land in northwest Croatia. These lands were referred to as the "Zone I," and were largely organised as the Governorate of Dalmatia.

In the north, the border was drawn to give Italy the cities of Kastav, Sušak, Fužine, Čabar, Bakar and a part of the Delnice district. In the central part of the eastern Adriatic coast, Italy received the land between the Zrmanja River and a point south of Split, as well as the Bay of Kotor in the South. Italy also gained all Adriatic islands except Pag, Brač and Hvar. Mussolini and Pavelić signed the treaty on 18 May in Rome, and the territories annexed under the treaty were incorporated into the Italian legal system by the Royal Decree Law 452, issued the same day.

The main treaty was accompanied by two additional border treaties. On 15 July, the border was adjusted between the NDH and the Italian-annexed Slovene Lands, while the NDH–Italian-occupied Montenegro border was determined in a treaty concluded on 27 October.

=== Agreement on Military Matters ===
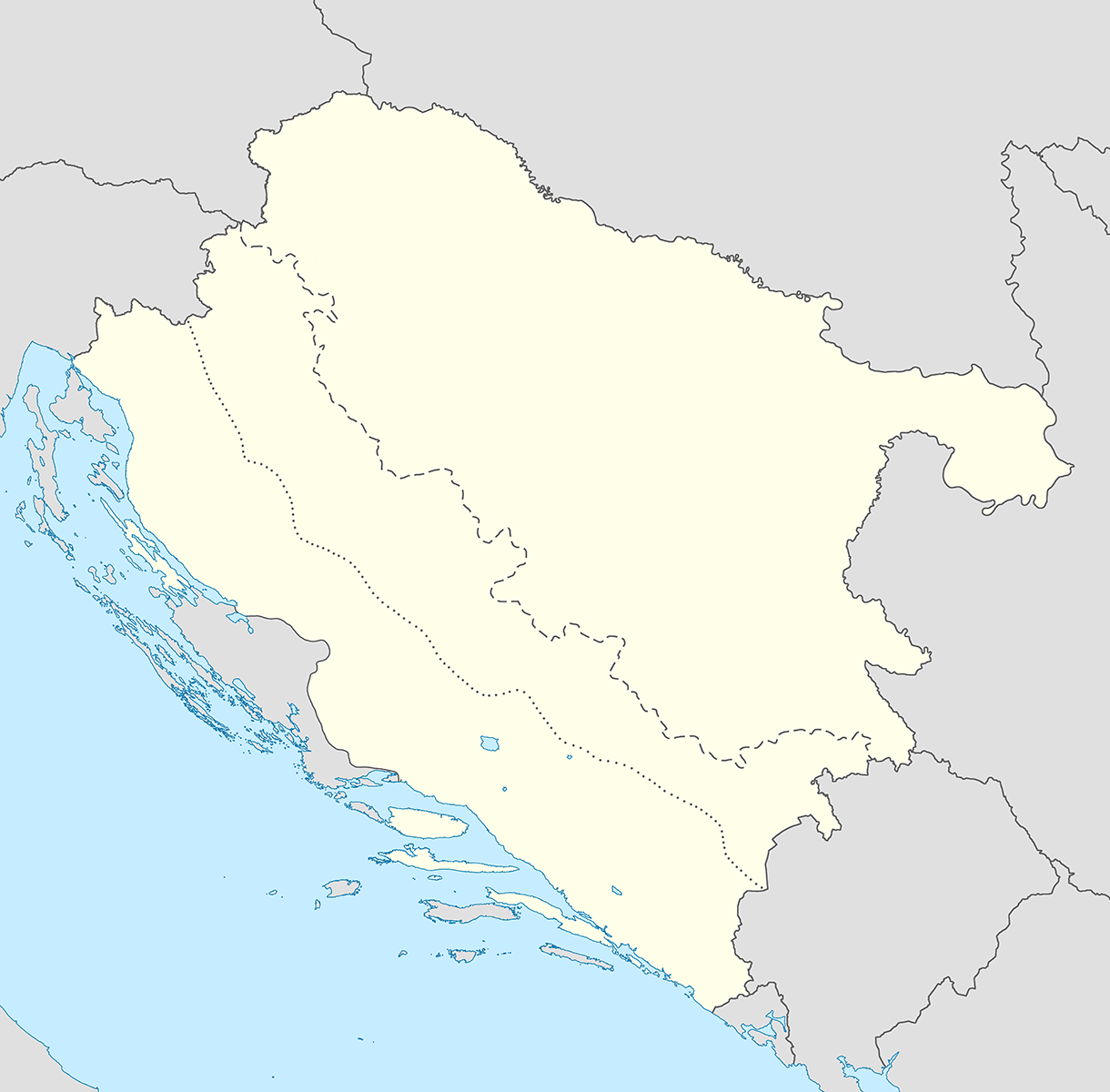
Italian zones of occupation in the Independent State of Croatia in 1941–1943

On 18 May the NDH and Italy also concluded the Agreement on Military Matters Pertaining to the Coastal Area. The agreement established further two areas within the Italian zone of occupation in the NDH. The Zone II was a strip of land running along the entire length of the Adriatic coast (or Zone I where present) between Slovenia and Montenegro, and the Zone III extended between the Zone II and the Vienna Line. The Agreement prohibited NDH to deploy troops in the Zone II, allowing it only to establish a civilian administration there. The Agreement also prohibited the Navy of the Independent State of Croatia from deploying to the Adriatic except for policing and customs control, and determined that Italian troops would be allowed to use roads and railroads to transit through the NDH pursuant to future agreements on the topic.

=== Treaty of Guarantee and Collaboration ===
Further matters were regulated by the 25-year Treaty of Guarantee and Collaboration, which stated that Italy guaranteed the political independence and inviolability of borders of the NDH, as determined by mutual agreement. It also prohibited the NDH from concluding international agreements contrary to the spirit of this treaty, and required the NDH to rely on Italy for development of its military. Finally, the treaty established a commission to study economic development opportunities to be exploited as circumstances improve. In a separate protocol, the signatories affirmed all treaties concluded between Yugoslavia and Italy.

=== Appointment of a king ===
Only hours before signing of the treaties, Pavelić formally requested Victor Emmanuel III to appoint a member of the House of Savoy to become the king of Croatia as previously agreed. Victor Emmanuel III responded by appointing the Prince Aimone, Duke of Spoleto to fill the position. As a result, the Treaties of Rome were signed on behalf of the "Kingdom of Croatia".

== Response ==
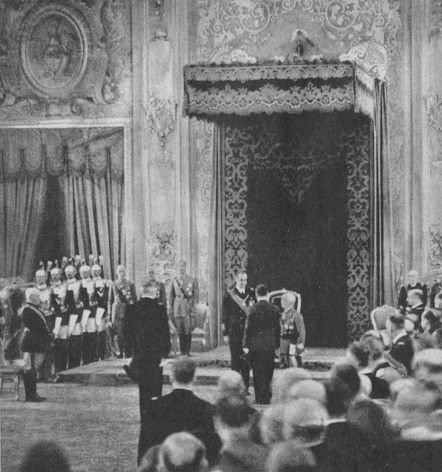
Designation of Prince Aimone as the King of Croatia on 18 May 1941.

The Roman treaties represented the materialisation of Mussolini's ambition to expand across the Adriatic. They made the NDH an Italian quasi-protectorate and confirmed that its independence was in name only. The treaties meant a loss of sovereign rights and a large swath of national territory, while inviting a foreign prince to become a Croatian sovereign. This in turn ensured that the Ustaše regime would not win universal acceptance even among Croats, or consolidate its rule across the NDH.

Although the German representatives in the NDH initially left the internal affairs to Italians to settle, they wondered about the justification of Italian territorial claims which had no apparent ethnic background. Ciano explained that the claims were also based on historical and cultural issues, as well as Italian need to improve borders and expand living space. Victor Emmanuel III predicted that the size of Italian problems would match the size of annexed territory, but was powerless to intervene.

The treaties were received extremely unfavourably by the Croat population, particularly among the people living along the Adriatic coast. In February 1942, Glaise-Horstenau remarked that the popular sentiment there was such that the population was eagerly awaiting the British Army to invade and liberate it, and that the local population would rise against the Axis powers. Even some Ustaše were shocked to learn of the terms of the treaty, and believed it would only serve Communist and Yugoslav Partisan propaganda. The treaties created a natural base for Partisan recruitment among the Croats, particularly in Dalmatia.

=== Reoccupation of Zones II and III ===
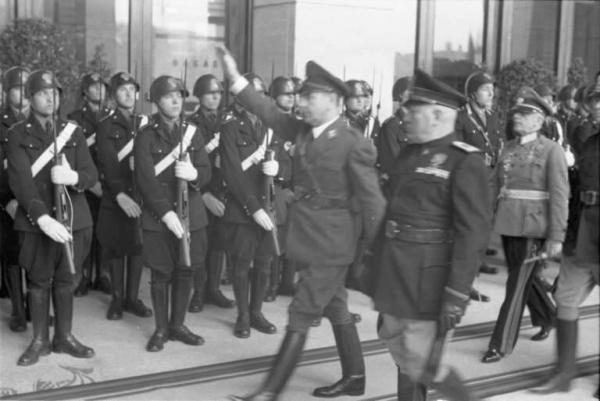
Ante Pavelić and Benito Mussolini in Rome on 18 May 1941

Even though the Italian forces withdrew from Zones II and III after the signing of the Treaties of Rome in May, this decision was reversed unilaterally on 22 August. The decision to reoccupy the NDH was purportedly motivated by the intention to counter Yugoslav Partisan guerillas, but it also served to deter German access to the Adriatic.

The reoccupation was formalised on 7 September, when Italy took over military and civilian administration of the Zone II, as well as military authority in the Zone III, thus reducing the NDH authority in the Zone III to civilian administration under Italian supervision. The full takeover of the Zone II gave Italy control over the territory requested by Ciano during the negotiations in Ljubljana in April 1941. Furthermore, on 27 October 1941, the NDH was pressured into supplying food to Italian troops in Zones II and III and to the civilian population in the Zone I. NDH troops largely moved out of the Italian-occupied zones, and the few that remained or returned after an agreement of 19 June 1942 were placed under Italian command.

In June 1942, Italian forces withdrew 70–80 battalions of 200 stationed in the Zones II and III, choosing to garrison large population centres and major routes of transport only. This was motivated by the events of the previous winter, when the Yugoslav Partisans managed to cut off isolated Italian garrisons. The withdrawal led the Italians to rely on the Anti-Communist Volunteer Militia, largely composed of Chetniks, as auxiliary units for anti-guerrilla warfare. When Italian troops retreated after defeats in the 1942 Montenegro offensive and in the Operation Alfa, Partisans exploited the pullout, retaking the town of Bihać and surrounding parts of Zones II and III in November 1942. This reclaimed territory became known as the Bihać Republic. Later that month, the Anti-Fascist Council for the National Liberation of Yugoslavia was established there as a Partisan-controlled pan-Yugoslav assembly.

== Repeal ==
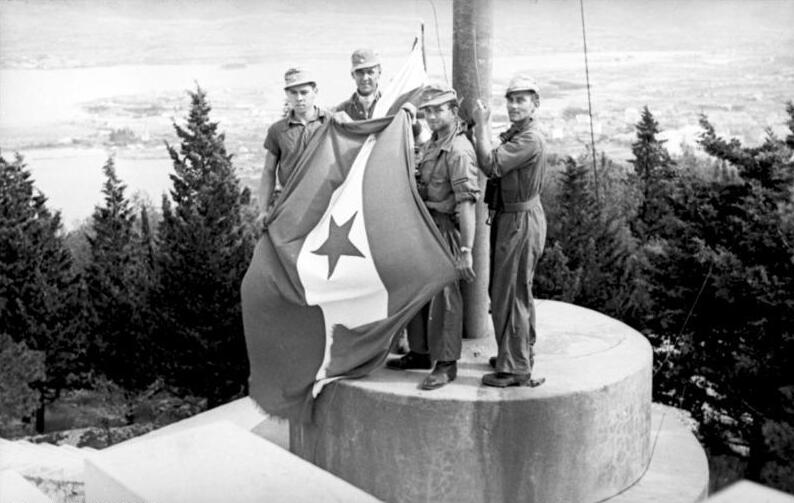
German troops removing the Partisan flag in Split after taking the town from the Yugoslav Partisans who briefly captured it after Italy surrendered.

Following the 3 September 1943 Armistice of Cassibile ahead of an Italian surrender, Italian troops in Yugoslavia were variously instructed to return to Italy, to provide weapons and supplies to the Partisans or to fight Germany together with the Partisans. Some Italian units were persuaded by Germans to switch allegiance to the Italian Social Republic.

The imminent Italian surrender was universally welcomed among the Croatian population. Those supporting the Partisan struggle viewed it as the collapse of an enemy power, while the Ustaše felt relieved by the end of Italian domination. On 10 September, Pavelić declared the Treaties of Rome void and proclaimed the addition of the Zone I to the NDH. In his declaration, Pavelić also announced annexation of areas previously outside of Yugoslavia; specifically, Zadar, Rijeka and the Croatian part of Istria. This move was blocked by Hitler, who established the Operational Zone of the Adriatic Littoral, which included the northernmost part of the former Zone I, as well as Rijeka and Istria. The NDH was also prohibited from annexing Zadar and the island of Lastovo.

As the Italian forces in the occupation zones disintegrated, Partisans moved to capture as much military equipment as possible. The NDH had virtually no troops in the area, and Germans restricted them to capturing Italian garrisons in Zagreb and Karlovac, while enlisting Chetniks in the push to secure control over the former Italian zones of occupation. Since the armistice of 1943, Italy has considered the treaties null and void, and the 1947 peace treaty between Italy and the Allied powers makes no reference to the 1941 Treaties of Rome at all.
