= G30 Lianyungang–Khorgas Expressway =

Expressway in China

Lianyungang–Khorgas Expressway
- 连云港－霍尔果斯高速公路
- Lianhuo Expressway 连霍高速公路

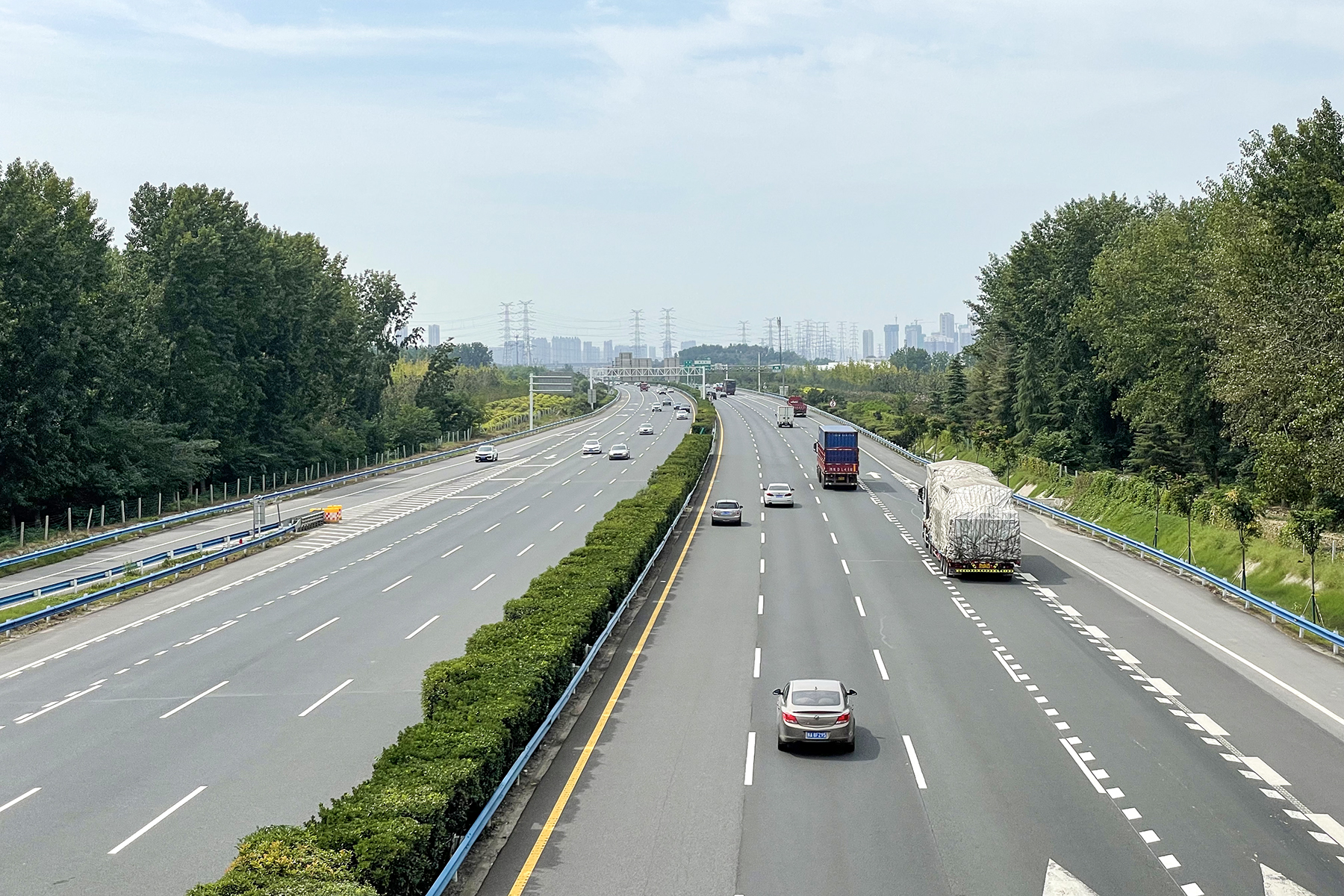
- G30 Zhengzhou section

Route information
- Part of AH4 AH5 AH9 AH34
- Length: 4,395 km (2,731 mi)

Major junctions
- East end: Dagang Road, Lianyun District, Lianyungang, Jiangsu
- G25 in Lianyungang, Jiangsu; G15 in Lianyungang, Jiangsu; G2 in Xinyi, Xuzhou, Jiangsu; G2513 in Xuzhou, Jiangsu; G3 in Xuzhou, Jiangsu; G3 in Suzhou, Anhui; G35 in Shangqiu, Henan; G1511 in Kaifeng, Henan; G45 in Kaifeng, Henan; G4 in Zhengzhou, Henan; G55 in Luoyang, Henan; G36 in Luoyang, Henan; G5 in Xi'an, Shaanxi; G65 in Xi'an, Shaanxi; G70 in Xi'an, Shaanxi; G22 in Dingxi, Gansu; G6 in Lanzhou, Gansu; G3011 in Jiuquan, Gansu (unopened); G3012 in Turpan, Xinjiang; G3014 / G3015 in Kuytun, Ili Kazakh, Xinjiang; G3016 in Ili Kazakh, Xinjiang
- West end: G312 in Khorgas, Huocheng County, Ili Kazakh, Xinjiang

Location
- Country: China
- Major cities: Lianyungang, Xuzhou, Shangqiu, Kaifeng, Zhengzhou, Luoyang, Sanmenxia, Weinan, Xi'an, Baoji, Tianshui, Lanzhou, Wuwei, Zhangye, Jiuquan, Hami, Turpan, Ürümqi

Highway system
- National Trunk Highway System; Primary; Auxiliary; National Highways; Transport in China
← G2531	→ G3001

The Lianyungang–Khorgas Expressway (Chinese: 连云港－霍尔果斯高速公路), designated as G30 and commonly referred to as the Lianhuo Expressway (Chinese: 连霍高速公路), is 4,243-kilometre-long expressway (2,636 mi) in China that connects the cities of Lianyungang, in the province of Jiangsu, and Khorgas, in the autonomous region of Xinjiang, on the border with Kazakhstan. At Khorgas, there is a border crossing into Kazakhstan. The expressway is the longest contiguous expressway in China with a single numeric designation, stretching across the country from the Yellow Sea on the east coast to the Kazakhstan border in the west. It passes through the provinces of Jiangsu, Anhui, Henan, Shaanxi, Gansu, and Xinjiang.

The entire G30 route is part of AH9, beside this one, the east route from Lianyungang to Xi'an is named AH34 in Asian Highway Network, as well as the west route from Xi'an to Khorgas is a part of AH5, and from Urumqi to Toksun is part of AH4.

Part of the Expressway passes through the historically significant Hexi Corridor in Gansu and Xinjiang.

China Expwy G30 sign with no name

China Expwy G30 sign with name

China Expwy G30 sign with name in Uyghur language

== Route ==
The expressway passes through the following cities:

- Lianyungang, Jiangsu
- Xuzhou, Jiangsu
- Shangqiu, Henan
- Kaifeng, Henan
- Zhengzhou, Henan
- Luoyang, Henan
- Sanmenxia, Henan
- Weinan, Shaanxi
- Xi'an, Shaanxi
- Baoji, Shaanxi
- Tianshui, Gansu
- Lanzhou, Gansu
- Wuwei, Gansu
- Zhangye, Gansu
- Jiuquan, Gansu
- Hami, Xinjiang
- Turpan, Xinjiang
- Ürümqi, Xinjiang
- Changji, Xinjiang
- Shihezi, Xinjiang
- Khorgas, Xinjiang

== Accidents ==
On February 1, 2013, a truck carrying fireworks exploded on the Yichang Bridge, which carries the Lianyungang–Khorgas Expressway, in Mianchi County, Sanmenxia, Henan, causing an 80 m section of bridge to collapse. 13 people died in the accident and 9 were injured.

== Exit list ==
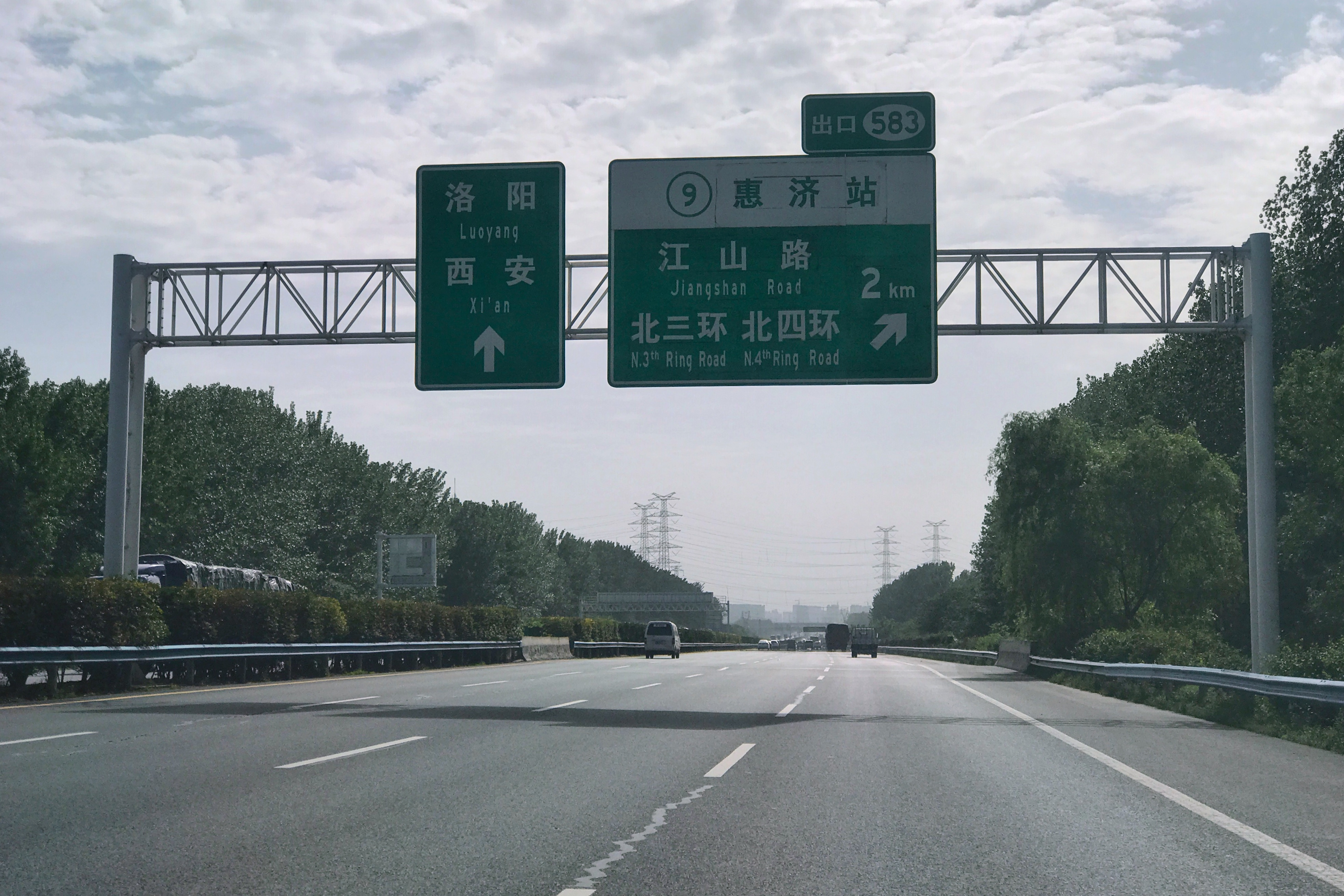
G30 near Huiji exit in Zhengzhou, Henan

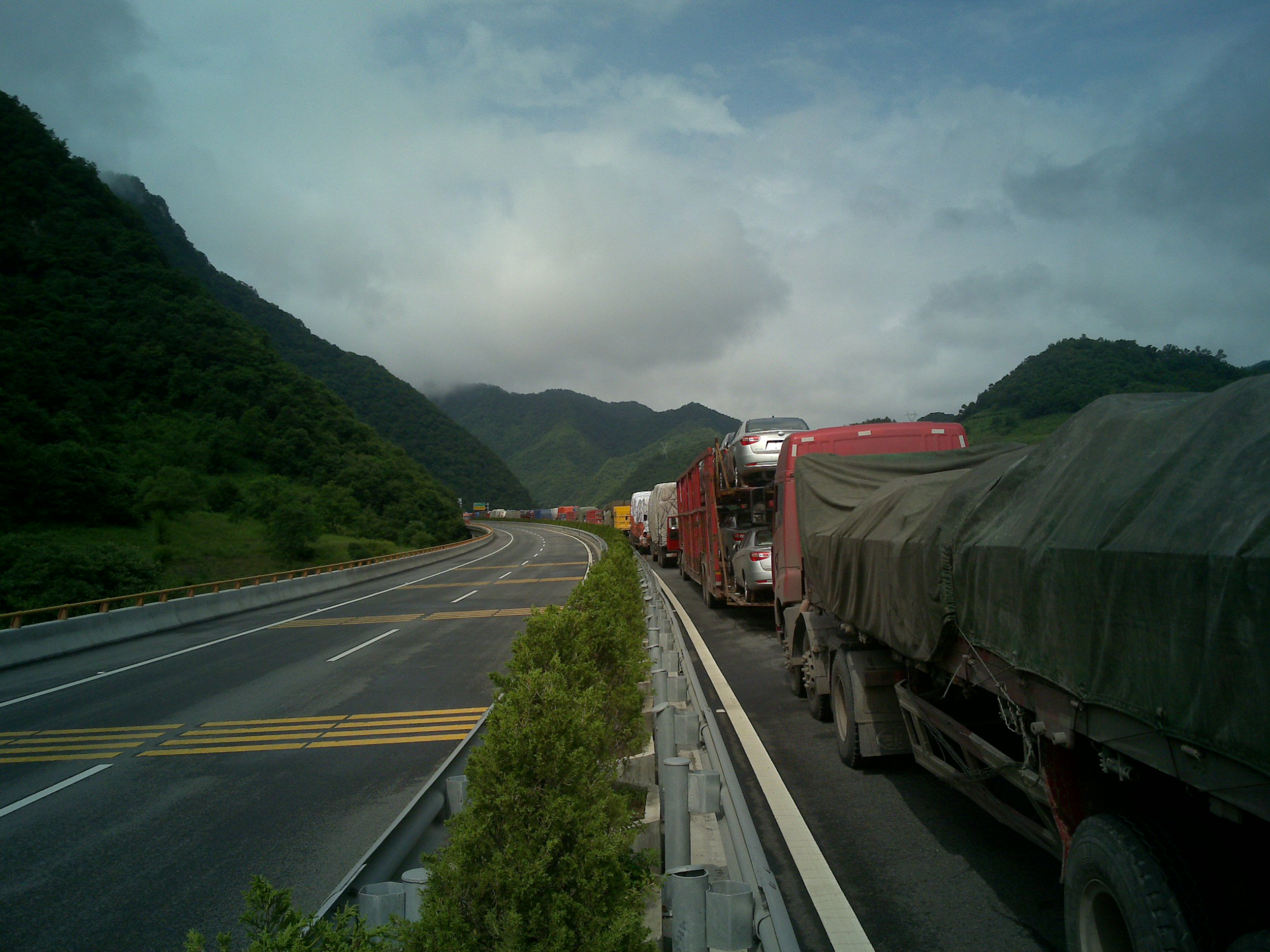
Jammed G30 in Gansu

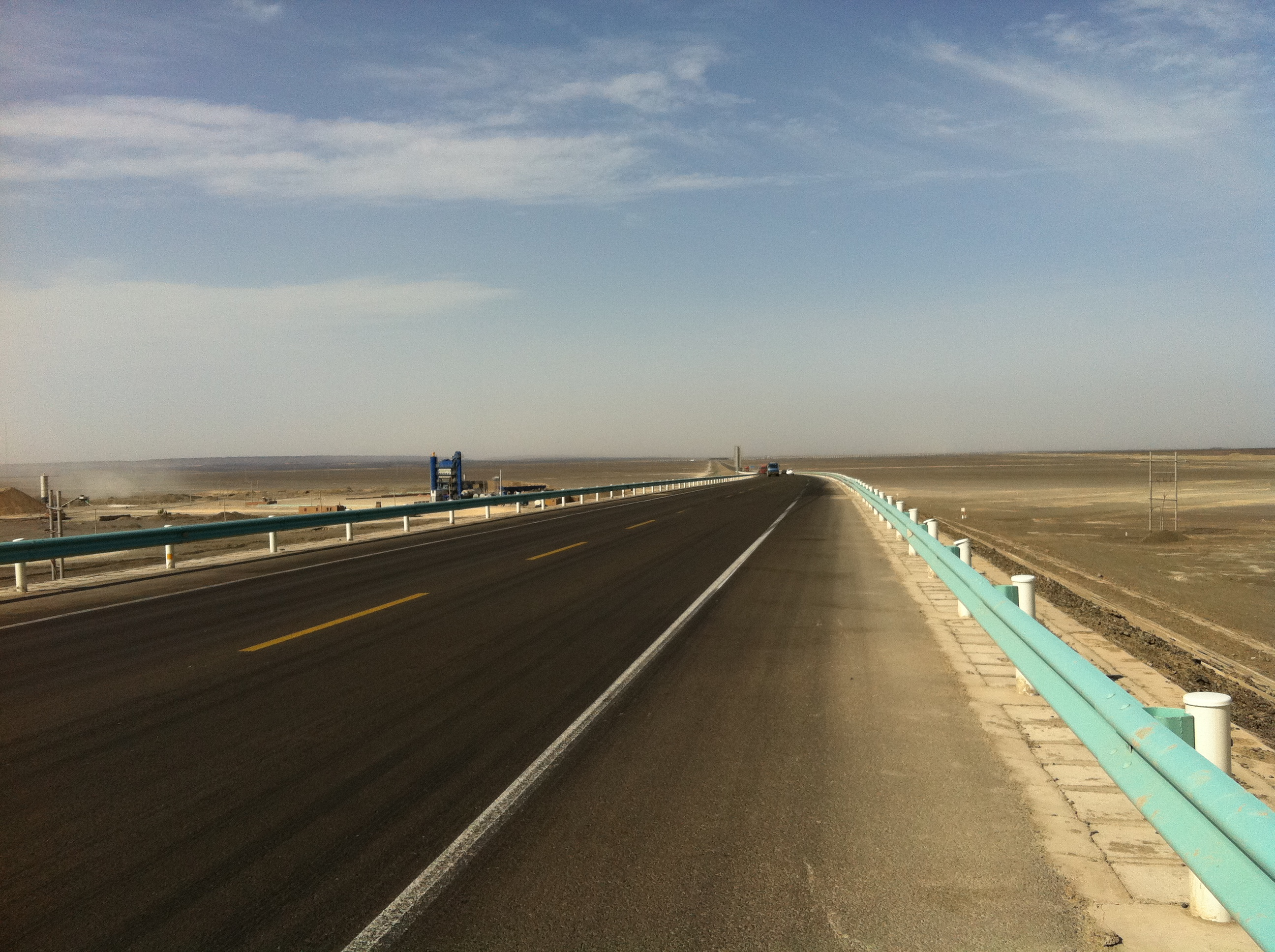
G30 in Xinjiang

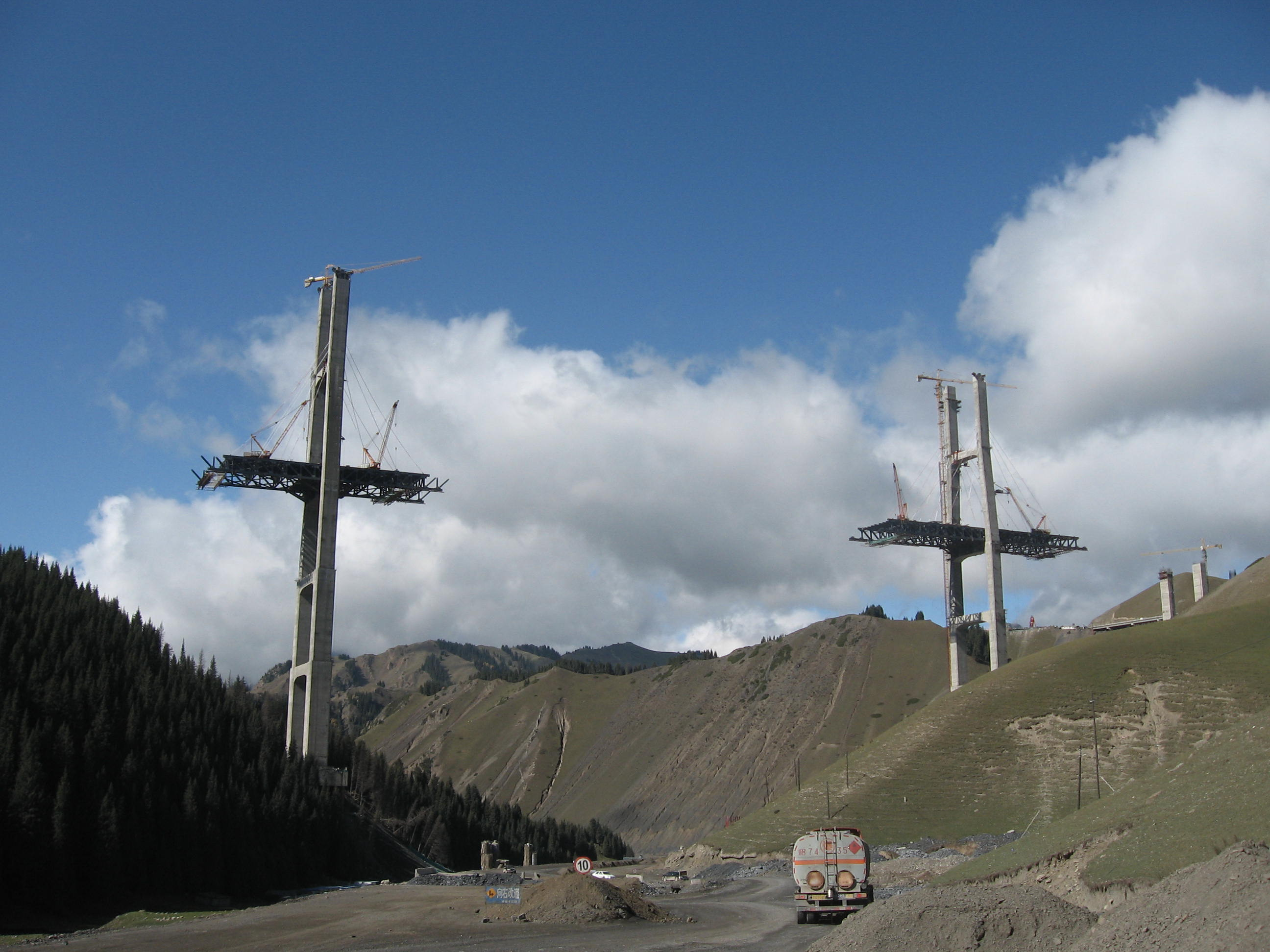
The Guozigou Bridge, pictured here under construction, forms part of the expressway in Xinjiang

Location	km	mi	Exit	Name	Destinations	Notes
G30 (Lianyungang–Khorgas Expressway)
Continues east as West Dike Rd. in Lian Island
Lianyun District, Lianyungang, Jiangsu	0	0		West Dike Road		
Lianyun District, Lianyungang, Jiangsu				Dagang Road – G228, Lianyungang Port		
Lianyun District, Lianyungang, Jiangsu			5	G310 – Lianyungang Development Area		Northbound exit and southbound entrance
Haizhou District, Lianyungang, Jiangsu			14	Dadaoshan Interchange	Jiangsu S73, Lianyungang Port	
Haizhou District, Lianyungang, Jiangsu	Yuwan Toll Station					
Haizhou District, Lianyungang, Jiangsu				Xuxin Road		Under construction
Haizhou District, Lianyungang, Jiangsu			29	Ninghai Interchange	G25 – Lianyungang urban area, Linyi, Huai'an, Nanjing	
Haizhou District, Lianyungang, Jiangsu	Jinpingshan Service Area					
Donghai County, Lianyungang, Jiangsu			56	Pingming	Jiangsu S267 – Lianyungang Baitabu Airport, Pingming	
Donghai County, Lianyungang, Jiangsu			71	Donghai	Jiangsu S245 – Donghai, Fangshan	
Donghai County, Lianyungang, Jiangsu	Donghai Service Area					
Donghai County, Lianyungang, Jiangsu				West Donghai	Jiangsu S464 – Donghai, Shihu	
Xinyi, Xuzhou, Jiangsu			104	Xinyi Interchange	G2 – Linyi, Huai'an	
Xinyi, Xuzhou, Jiangsu			110	Beigou Interchange	Jiangsu S49 – Suqian	
Xinyi, Xuzhou, Jiangsu			118	Xinyi	Jiangsu S249 / G311 – Xinyi, Tangdian	
Xinyi, Xuzhou, Jiangsu			126	West Xinyi	Jiangsu S505 (Guzhen Avenue) – Xinyi, Yaowan	
Xinyi, Xuzhou, Jiangsu	Gangtou Service Area					
Pizhou, Xuzhou, Jiangsu			148	East Pizhou	Longhai Avenue – Pizhou	
Pizhou, Xuzhou, Jiangsu	Yitang Service Area					
Pizhou, Xuzhou, Jiangsu			161	West Pizhou	Jiangsu S250 – Pizhou, Yitang	
Pizhou, Xuzhou, Jiangsu				Bayiji	Jiangsu S271 – Bayiji	
Tongshan District, Xuzhou, Jiangsu			191	Dongtan	Jiangsu S252 – Shanji	
Tongshan District, Xuzhou, Jiangsu	Shaolou Service Area					
Tongshan District, Xuzhou, Jiangsu			213	Lindong Interchange	G2513 – East Xuzhou, Jinan, Suqian, Huai'an, Guanyin Airport	
Yunlong District, Xuzhou, Jiangsu			218	Xuzhou	G104 – Xuzhou	
Tongshan District, Xuzhou, Jiangsu	Bizhuang Service Area					
Tongshan District, Xuzhou, Jiangsu			230	South Xuzhou	G206 – Tongshan	
Tongshan District, Xuzhou, Jiangsu			235	Luogang Interchange	G3 – West Xuzhou, Jining, Fengxian, Peixian	East end of G3 concurrency
Tongshan District, Xuzhou, Jiangsu	Suwan Border Toll Station					
Xiaoxian, Suzhou, Anhui			242	Zhuxuzi Interchange	G3 / Anhui S301 – Huaibei, Suzhou, East Xiaoxian	West end of G3 concurrency
Xiaoxian, Suzhou, Anhui				South Xiaoxian	Anhui S202 – Xiaoxian, Huaibei	
Xiaoxian, Suzhou, Anhui	Wangzhai Service Area					
Xiaoxian, Suzhou, Anhui				Zhangzhuangzhai	Anhui S101 – Zhangzhuangzhai	
Xiaoxian, Suzhou, Anhui	Yuwan Border Toll Station					
Yongcheng, Shangqiu, Henan	Yuwan Border Service Area					
Yongcheng, Shangqiu, Henan	296.6	184.3	296	Mangdangshan	Henan S201 – Mangdang Mountain, Mangshan	
Yongcheng, Shangqiu, Henan			297	G0321 – Dangshan, Yongcheng		
Xiayi County, Shangqiu, Henan	Xiayi Service Area					
Xiayi County, Shangqiu, Henan	328	204	328	Xiayi	X060 – Xiayi	
Yucheng County, Shangqiu, Henan	357	222	357	Yucheng	Henan S203 – Yucheng	
Yucheng County, Shangqiu, Henan			363	G35 – East Shangqiu, Bozhou		
Suiyang District, Shangqiu, Henan	375.6	233.4	375	South Shangqiu	G105 (Guide Road) – Shangqiu	
Suiyang District, Shangqiu, Henan	Shangqiu Service Area					
Suiyang District, Shangqiu, Henan	384.5	238.9	384	Shangqiu	Henan S206 (Pingyuan Road) – Shangqiu	
Liangyuan District, Shangqiu, Henan			388	Henan S81 – West Shangqiu, Zhoukou		
Liangyuan District, Shangqiu, Henan			396	Shangqiu Airport	Henan S60 / Henan S325 – Dengfeng, Guantang	
Ningling County, Shangqiu, Henan	411.9	255.9	412	Ningling	Henan S210 – Ningling	
Ningling County, Shangqiu, Henan	Ningling Service Area					
Minquan County, Shangqiu, Henan	435	270	435	Minquan	Henan S211 – Minquan	
Minquan County, Shangqiu, Henan			440	Henan S82 – Qixian, Zhengzhou		
Minquan County, Shangqiu, Henan	Minquan Service Area					
Lankao County, Kaifeng, Henan	470	290	470	Lankao	G106 / G310 – Lankao	
Lankao County, Kaifeng, Henan			481	G1511 / Henan S83 – Heze, Jinan, Xuchang, Nanyang, Henan		
Xiangfu District, Kaifeng, Henan	493.2	306.5	493	East Kaifeng	Henan S213 – Duliang	
Xiangfu District, Kaifeng, Henan			500 A-B	G45 – Fengqiu, Puyang, Zhoukou		
Longting District, Kaifeng, Henan	Kaifeng Service Area					
Longting District, Kaifeng, Henan	519.5	322.8	519	Kaifeng	Henan S219 (Jinming Avenue) – Kaifeng	
Zhongmu County, Zhengzhou, Henan				Henan S89 – Weishi, Xihua		Under construction
Zhongmu County, Zhengzhou, Henan	543.1	337.5	543	Zhongmu	Henan S223 – Zhongmu	
Zhongmu County, Zhengzhou, Henan	Zhongmu Service Area					
Zhongmu County, Zhengzhou, Henan				G107 (Wansan Road)		Under construction
Jinshui District, Zhengzhou, Henan			562	Liujiang Interchange	G4 / G3001 – Xinxiang, Beijing, Xuchang, Wuhan, Zhengzhou Xinzheng International Airport	East end of G3001 concurrency
Jinshui District, Zhengzhou, Henan			567	East 3rd Ring Rd. (N)	East 3rd Ring Road (northern extension) – Xinxiang, Pingyuan New Area	
Jinshui District, Zhengzhou, Henan	575.4	357.5	575	Liulin	Zhongzhou Avenue – Downtown Zhengzhou, Zhengdong New Area CBD	
Jinshui District, Zhengzhou, Henan	577	359	577	Huayuan Rd.	Huayuan N. Road – Downtown Zhengzhou	
Jinshui District, Zhengzhou, Henan			581	Wenhua Rd.	Wenhua N. Road – Downtown Zhengzhou	
Huiji District, Zhengzhou, Henan	583	362	583	Huiji	Jiangshan Road – Zhengzhou Yellow River Scenic Area; Jingguang Expressway – Downtown Zhengzhou; Tianhe Road – Huiji	
Zhongyuan District, Zhengzhou, Henan				West 3rd Ring Rd. (N)	West 3rd Ring Road (northern extension)	
Zhongyuan District, Zhengzhou, Henan	Zhengzhou North Service Area					
Zhongyuan District, Zhengzhou, Henan	590.7	367.0	591	Gouzhao	West 4th Ring Road – Hi-tech Development Zone	
Xingyang, Zhengzhou, Henan	596	370	596	Guangwu Interchange	G3001 / Henan S87 – Other destinations in west Zhengzhou, Shaolin Temple, Yaoshan, Yuntai Mountain	West end of G3001 concurrency
Xingyang, Zhengzhou, Henan	605.6	376.3	605	Xingyang	Henan S232 – Xingyang, Gaocun	
Xingyang, Zhengzhou, Henan	616.8	383.3	616	Shangjie	Yinghua Avenue – Hulaoguan; Gongye Road – Shangjie	
Gongyi, Zhengzhou, Henan	636.4	395.4	636	East Gongyi	Henan S237 – Gongyi, Wenxian	
Gongyi, Zhengzhou, Henan			637	Henan S49 – Dengfeng, Ruzhou		
Gongyi, Zhengzhou, Henan	Gongyi Service Area					
Gongyi, Zhengzhou, Henan	642.8	399.4	642	Gongyi	Shihe Road – Gongyi, Henan S314 – Kangbaiwan's Mansion	
Yanshi, Luoyang, Henan	663.9	412.5	663	Yanshi	X006 – Yanshi	
Mengjin County, Luoyang, Henan	676.5	420.4	676	Mengjin	G207 – Mengjin, Huimeng	
Mengjin County, Luoyang, Henan			678	G55 – Jiyuan, Nanyang, Pingdingshan		
Mengjin County, Luoyang, Henan	Luoyang Service Area					
Mengjin County, Luoyang, Henan	681.5	423.5	681	East Luoyang	Henan S238 – Luoyang, Jili	
Mengjin County, Luoyang, Henan			691	Mengjin Urban Area	Henan S243 – Mengjin	
Mengjin County, Luoyang, Henan	694.9	431.8	695	Luoyang	Wangcheng Avenue – Downtown Luoyang; G310 – Xiaolangdi	
Mengjin County, Luoyang, Henan			704	G36 – Yichuan, Pingdingshan, Luohe		
Xin'an County, Luoyang, Henan	723.5	449.6	723	Xin'an	G246 (Beijing Road) – Xin'an	
Xin'an County, Luoyang, Henan	728	452	728	West Xin'an	G310 – Tiemen	
Mianchi County, Sanmenxia, Henan	Mianchi Service Area					
Yima, Sanmenxia, Henan	748.5	465.1	748	Yima	Yimian Road – Yima	
Mianchi County, Sanmenxia, Henan	758	471	758	Mianchi	Xinhua N. Road – Mianchi, G310 (Huimeng Road)	
Mianchi County, Sanmenxia, Henan	West Mianchi Parking Area					
Shanzhou District, Sanmenxia, Henan	777	483	777	Guanyintang	X012 – G310 – Guanyintang	
Hubin District, Sanmenxia, Henan	810	500	810	East Sanmenxia	G310 (Shanzhou Avenue) – Sanmenxia	
Hubin District, Sanmenxia, Henan	Sanmenxia Service Area					
Shanzhou District, Sanmenxia, Henan	830.8	516.2	831	West Sanmenxia	G310 – Shanzhou	
Lingbao, Sanmenxia, Henan			842	G59 – Lushi		
Lingbao, Sanmenxia, Henan	845	525	845	Lingbao	Kaiyuan Avenue – Lingbao	
Lingbao, Sanmenxia, Henan	Lingbao Service Area					
Lingbao, Sanmenxia, Henan	869.4	540.2	869	West Lingbao	G310 – West Lingbao	
Lingbao, Sanmenxia, Henan	Yushan Border Service Area					
Lingbao, Sanmenxia, Henan	893	555	893	Yuling	G310 – Yuling	
Lingbao, Sanmenxia, Henan	Yushan Border Toll Station					
Tongguan County, Weinan, Shaanxi	Tongguan Toll Station					
Tongguan County, Weinan, Shaanxi	Tongguan Parking Area					
Tongguan County, Weinan, Shaanxi				Qindong	X319 – Qindong; Fenglingdu Yellow River Bridge – Fenglingdu	
Tongguan County, Weinan, Shaanxi				Gangkou	X204 – Gangkou, Tongguan, Tongguan Ancient Town	
Huayin, Weinan, Shaanxi			932	Huayin	X209 (Huayue Avenue) / X319 / G310 – Huayin, Huashan (Mount Hua)	
Huayin, Weinan, Shaanxi	Huashan Service Area					
Huayin, Weinan, Shaanxi				Luofu	G310 / Shaanxi S202 – Luofu	
Huazhou District, Weinan, Shaanxi			963	Huazhou	Xinqin Road – G310 – Huazhou, Shaohuashan	
Huazhou District, Weinan, Shaanxi	Nansha Parking Area					
Huazhou District, Weinan, Shaanxi				West Huazhou	G310 – Guapo	
Huazhou District, Weinan, Shaanxi			973	Chishui Interchange	G6521 – Pucheng, Lantian	
Linwei District, Weinan, Shaanxi			984	East Weinan	G310 (Huashan Street) – Weinan	
Linwei District, Weinan, Shaanxi			992	West Weinan	G108 (Weiqing Road) / G310 (Huashan Street) – Weinan	
Linwei District, Weinan, Shaanxi	West Weinan Service Area					
Lintong District, Xi'an, Shaanxi			1000	Lingkou Interchange	G3021 – Gaoling, Jingyang, Xingping	
Lintong District, Xi'an, Shaanxi			1012	Xinfeng	X207 – Xinfeng, Yanliang	
Lintong District, Xi'an, Shaanxi			1017	Bingmayong	Qin Shi Huang's Mausoleum, Terracotta Army	
Lintong District, Xi'an, Shaanxi				Lintong	G108 – Lintong	
Lintong District, Xi'an, Shaanxi	Lintong Service Area					
Baqiao District, Xi'an, Shaanxi				Huokou	Shaanxi S101 / G210 – Tianwang, Gengzhen	
Baqiao District, Xi'an, Shaanxi				Fangjiacun Interchange	G3002 / G65 / G70 – East Xi'an, Lantian, Ankang, Hanzhong	East end of G3002, G65 and G70 concurrency
Baqiao District, Xi'an, Shaanxi				Xiewang Interchange	G5 – Hancheng, Taiyuan; E. 3rd Ring Road	East end of G5 concurrency
Baqiao District, Xi'an, Shaanxi				Xingyuan	Yingbin Avenue; Shibo Avenue – Xi'an World-Expo Park	
Weiyang District, Xi'an, Shaanxi				Weiyang	G65 – Sanyuan, Tongchuan, Yan'an; Weiyang Road – Downtown Xi'an	West end of G65 concurrency
Weiyang District, Xi'an, Shaanxi				Zhuhong Road Interchange	Airport Expressway – Xi'an Xianyang International Airport; Zhuhong Road – Downtown Xi'an	
Weiyang District, Xi'an, Shaanxi	Hancheng Service Area					
Weiyang District, Xi'an, Shaanxi				Liucunbu	G70 – Xi'an Xianyang International Airport, Pingliang, Yinchuan; W. 3rd Ring Road	West end of G70 concurrency
Qindu District, Xianyang, Shaanxi				Mao'erliu Interchange	G5 / G3002 – Sanqiao, Huyi, Hanzhong, Ankang, Lantian	West end of G5 and G3002 concurrency
Qindu District, Xianyang, Shaanxi			1080	Xianyang	G312 – Xianyang; Chenliang Road – Fengxi New Town	
Qindu District, Xianyang, Shaanxi			1086	West Xianyang	Xianping Road – West Xianyang, Xianyang Hi-tech Zone	
Xingping, Xianyang, Shaanxi			1097	Xiwu Interchange	G3021 – South Xianyang, Epang Palace, Jingyang, Gaoling, Lintong	
Xingping, Xianyang, Shaanxi			1100	Xingping	Yingbin Avenue, Shaanxi S104 – Xingping	
Wugong County, Xianyang, Shaanxi	Wugong Service Area					
Wugong County, Xianyang, Shaanxi			1127	Wugong	Shaanxi S107 – Wugong, Zhouzhi	
Yangling District, Xianyang, Shaanxi			1138	Yangling	Yangling	
Yangling District, Xianyang, Shaanxi				West Yangling	West Yangling	
Fufeng County, Baoji, Shaanxi				Jiangzhang	Shaanxi S209 – Jiangzhang, Hengqu	
Fufeng County, Baoji, Shaanxi				Lanjiacun Interchange	Shaanxi S107 – Taibaishan, Fufeng	
Mei County, Baoji, Shaanxi				Changxing	Changxing Avenue – Changxing	
Mei County, Baoji, Shaanxi	Meixian Service Area					
Mei County, Baoji, Shaanxi				Meixian	Linmei Road, G310 – Meixian	
Qishan County, Baoji, Shaanxi				Caijiapo	Qishan Avenue – Qishan	
Chencang District, Baoji, Shaanxi	Yangping Parking Area					
Chencang District, Baoji, Shaanxi			1206	Guozhen	G244 – Guozhen, Fengxiang	
Chencang District, Baoji, Shaanxi				G85 – Fengxiang, Pingliang		
Jintai District, Baoji, Shaanxi			1223	Baoji	Jintai Avenue – Baoji	
Weibin District, Baoji, Shaanxi			1227	Jiangcheng	G310 / Shaanxi S212 – Jiangcheng, Fengxian	
Weibin District, Baoji, Shaanxi	West Baoji Service Area					
Weibin District, Baoji, Shaanxi			1233	West Baoji	G310 – West Baoji, Fulinbao	
Chencang District, Baoji, Shaanxi				Pingtou	G310 – Pingtou	
Chencang District, Baoji, Shaanxi	Chencang Toll Station					
Maiji District, Tianshui, Gansu	Dongcha Toll Station					
Maiji District, Tianshui, Gansu				Dongcha	G310 – Dongcha	
Maiji District, Tianshui, Gansu	Taohuaping Parking Area					
Maiji District, Tianshui, Gansu				Taohuaping	Taohuaping	
Maiji District, Tianshui, Gansu				Liqiao	X444 – Liqiao	
Maiji District, Tianshui, Gansu	Baihua Service Area					
Maiji District, Tianshui, Gansu				Shimen	X444 – Dangchuan, Shimen	
Maiji District, Tianshui, Gansu				Jieting	Y629 – Jieting	
Maiji District, Tianshui, Gansu			1358	East Tianshui	X444 – Maijishan Grottoes, G310	
Maiji District, Tianshui, Gansu	Ganquan Service Area					
Qinzhou District, Tianshui, Gansu				G7011 – Longnan, Hanzhong		
Qinzhou District, Tianshui, Gansu				South Tianshui	G316 – Zaojiao	
Qinzhou District, Tianshui, Gansu			1394	West Tianshui	G316 – Tianshui	
Qinzhou District, Tianshui, Gansu				Guanzi	G316 – Guanzi	
Qinzhou District, Tianshui, Gansu	Guanzi Parking Area					
Gangu County, Tianshui, Gansu				Gangu	G316 – Gangu	
Gangu County, Tianshui, Gansu	Gangu Service Area					
Gangu County, Tianshui, Gansu				Pan'an	G316 – Pan'an	
Wushan County, Tianshui, Gansu				Luomen	G316 – Luomen	
Wushan County, Tianshui, Gansu				Wushan	G316 – Wushan	
Wushan County, Tianshui, Gansu				Yuanyang	G316 – Yuanyang	
Wushan County, Tianshui, Gansu	Yuanyang Service Area					
Longxi County, Dingxi, Gansu				Wenfeng	G316 – Longxi	
Longxi County, Dingxi, Gansu				Gansu S14 – Weiyuan		
Longxi County, Dingxi, Gansu	Tong'anyi Service Area					
Longxi County, Dingxi, Gansu				Tong'anyi	Gansu S209 – Tong'anyi	
Anding District, Dingxi, Gansu				Tongwei	G310 – Tongwei	
Anding District, Dingxi, Gansu				Dingxi	Jiefang Road, Jiaotong Road – Dingxi urban area	
Anding District, Dingxi, Gansu				North Dingxi	Jiaotong Road – Dingxi urban area	
Anding District, Dingxi, Gansu				G22 – Huining, Pingliang		East end of G22 concurrency
Anding District, Dingxi, Gansu	Dingxi Service Area					
Anding District, Dingxi, Gansu				Chankou	G312 – Chankou	
Yuzhong County, Lanzhou, Gansu				Gancaodian	G312 – Gancaodian	
Yuzhong County, Lanzhou, Gansu	Jiejiazui Service Area					
Yuzhong County, Lanzhou, Gansu				Sanjiaocheng	Gansu S101 – Yuzhong	
Yuzhong County, Lanzhou, Gansu				Dingyuan	G312 – Dingyuan	
Yuzhong County, Lanzhou, Gansu				G2201		G2201 under construction
Yuzhong County, Lanzhou, Gansu				Liugouhe	G312 – Heping	
Chengguan District, Lanzhou, Gansu				East Lanzhou	G312 – East Lanzhou	
Chengguan District, Lanzhou, Gansu				Lanzhou	Yellow River Bridge – Lanzhou urban area	West terminus of G22; West end of G22 concurrency
Chengguan District, Lanzhou, Gansu				North Lanzhou	G109 – North Lanzhou	
Chengguan District, Lanzhou, Gansu	North Lanzhou Service Area					
Gaolan County, Lanzhou, Gansu				Fujiayao	G109; Lanqin Expressway – Shuifu, Lanzhou New Area	
Gaolan County, Lanzhou, Gansu				Zhonghe Interchange	G6 – Baiyin, Yinchuan	East end of G6 concurrency
Yongdeng County, Lanzhou, Gansu				Shuping Interchange	G6 – Xining	West end of G6 concurrency
Yongdeng County, Lanzhou, Gansu				Maocixian Interchange	Gansu S1 – Lanzhou Zhongchuan International Airport	
Yongdeng County, Lanzhou, Gansu	Longquansi Parking Area					
Yongdeng County, Lanzhou, Gansu	1764.4	1,096.3	1764	Longquansi	Gansu S102 – Longquansi	
Yongdeng County, Lanzhou, Gansu				Yongdeng	G312 – Yongdeng	
Yongdeng County, Lanzhou, Gansu	Yongdeng Service Area					
Yongdeng County, Lanzhou, Gansu				Zhongbao	G312 – Zhongbao	
Yongdeng County, Lanzhou, Gansu	1812.9	1,126.5	1813	Wushengyi	G312 – Wushengyi	
Tianzhu County, Wuwei, Gansu				Tianzhu	G312 – Tianzhu	
Tianzhu County, Wuwei, Gansu	Huacangsi Parking Area					
Tianzhu County, Wuwei, Gansu	Anmen Service Area					
Tianzhu County, Wuwei, Gansu				Anmen	G312 – Anmen	
Gulang County, Wuwei, Gansu				Gufeng	X145 – Gufeng	
Gulang County, Wuwei, Gansu				Gulang	G312 – Gulang	
Gulang County, Wuwei, Gansu				Shuangta	G312 / Gansu S308 – Shuangta, Jingtai	
Gulang County, Wuwei, Gansu				G2012 – Jingtai, Zhongwei		
Liangzhou District, Wuwei, Gansu				Huangyang	G312 – Huangyang	
Liangzhou District, Wuwei, Gansu	South Wuwei Service Area					
Liangzhou District, Wuwei, Gansu				Wunan	Tianma Avenue, G312 – Wunan	
Liangzhou District, Wuwei, Gansu				Wuwei	G312 – Wuwei urban area	
Liangzhou District, Wuwei, Gansu				G3017 – Jinchang		
Liangzhou District, Wuwei, Gansu	1984.3	1,233.0	1984	Fengle	G312 – Fengle	
Yongchang County, Jinchang, Gansu				Yongchang Interchange	Gansu S17 – Jinchang	
Yongchang County, Jinchang, Gansu				South Yongchang	G312 / Gansu S212 – Yongchang	
Yongchang County, Jinchang, Gansu	2025.4	1,258.5	2025	Yongchang	G312 – Yongchang	
Yongchang County, Jinchang, Gansu	2043.7	1,269.9	2044	Mayingkou	G312	
Shandan County, Zhangye, Gansu	2089.3	1,298.2	2089	Fengchengbao	G312	
Shandan County, Zhangye, Gansu	Service Area					
Shandan County, Zhangye, Gansu	2120.7	1,317.7	2121	East Shandan	Shandan	
Shandan County, Zhangye, Gansu	Shandan Service Area					
Shandan County, Zhangye, Gansu	2133.3	1,325.6	2133	West Shandan	G312 – Shandan	
Ganzhou District, Zhangye, Gansu				Laosimiao	G312	
Ganzhou District, Zhangye, Gansu	Zhangye Service Area					
Ganzhou District, Zhangye, Gansu			2186	Zhangye	G227 – Zhangye, Minle	
Ganzhou District, Zhangye, Gansu			2195	West Zhangye	Gansu S213 – Zhangye, Sunan	
Linze County, Zhangye, Gansu				Linze	Xiaokang Road – Linze	
Gaotai County, Zhangye, Gansu	Gaotai Service Area					
Gaotai County, Zhangye, Gansu				Gaotai	Gaohuo Highway – Gaotai	
Gaotai County, Zhangye, Gansu				Wutongquan	G312	
Suzhou District, Jiuquan, Gansu				Qingshui	Qingyuan Road – G312 – Qingshui	
Suzhou District, Jiuquan, Gansu				Xiaheqing	Xiaheqing	
Suzhou District, Jiuquan, Gansu				Zongzhai	G312 – Shangba, Zongzhai	
Suzhou District, Jiuquan, Gansu			2392	Jiuquan	Suzhou Road – Jiuquan urban area	
Suzhou District, Jiuquan, Gansu	Jiuquan Service Area					
Jiayuguan, Gansu			2411	Jiayuguan	Jiayuguan urban area, Jiayu Pass	
Jiayuguan, Gansu			2427	Heishanhu	Gansu S215 / G312 – West Jiayuguan, Yumen East Railway Station	
Yumen, Jiuquan, Gansu	Qingquan Parking Area					
Yumen, Jiuquan, Gansu				Qingquan	G312 – Qingquan	
Yumen, Jiuquan, Gansu	Chijin Parking Area					
Yumen, Jiuquan, Gansu				Chijin	G312 / X267 – Chijin	
Yumen, Jiuquan, Gansu			2513	Diwopu	G312 – Diwopu Diggings	
Yumen, Jiuquan, Gansu	2531.8	1,573.2	2532	East Yumen		Closed
Yumen, Jiuquan, Gansu	2534.4	1,574.8	2534	Yumen	Tieren Avenue – Yumen	
Yumen, Jiuquan, Gansu	Yumen City Service Area					
Yumen, Jiuquan, Gansu	2541.8	1,579.4	2541	West Yumen		Closed
Guazhou County, Jiuquan, Gansu			2583	Qiaowan	Gansu S216 – Qiaowan	
Guazhou County, Jiuquan, Gansu	Bulongji Service Area					
Guazhou County, Jiuquan, Gansu			2621	West Shuangta	G312 – Shuangta	
Guazhou County, Jiuquan, Gansu				G3011 – Dunhuang		
Guazhou County, Jiuquan, Gansu			2668	Guazhou	Gansu S314 – Guazhou, Dunhuang	
Guazhou County, Jiuquan, Gansu	Guazhou Parking Area					
Guazhou County, Jiuquan, Gansu	Liuyuan Service Area					
Guazhou County, Jiuquan, Gansu			2737	Liuyuan	G215 – Liuyuan, Dunhuang	
Guazhou County, Jiuquan, Gansu	Malianjing Service Area					
Yizhou District, Hami, Xinjiang	Xingxingxia Service Area					
Yizhou District, Hami, Xinjiang	Xingxingxia Toll Station					
Yizhou District, Hami, Xinjiang	Shaquanzi Parking Area					
Yizhou District, Hami, Xinjiang	Mutoujing Parking Area					
Yizhou District, Hami, Xinjiang	Weiya Railway Station Parking Area					
Yizhou District, Hami, Xinjiang	Kushui Parking Area					
Yizhou District, Hami, Xinjiang	Tongniekuang Parking Area					
Yizhou District, Hami, Xinjiang	Service Area					
Yizhou District, Hami, Xinjiang	Yandun Toll Station					
Yizhou District, Hami, Xinjiang				Yandun	X091	
Yizhou District, Hami, Xinjiang	Guanglanzhan Parking Area					
Yizhou District, Hami, Xinjiang	Industrial Park Parking Area					
Yizhou District, Hami, Xinjiang			2963	Luotuoquanzi	G7 / Xinjiang S328	East end of G7 concurrency
Yizhou District, Hami, Xinjiang	Luotuoquanzi Service Area					
Yizhou District, Hami, Xinjiang	Service Area					
Yizhou District, Hami, Xinjiang				Qincheng	Qincheng, Olatay (Wulatai)	
Yizhou District, Hami, Xinjiang			2975	Hongxing 4th Farm	Hongxing 4th Farm	
Yizhou District, Hami, Xinjiang	Daquanwan Parking Area					
Yizhou District, Hami, Xinjiang			2999	Hami Airport	G312 – Hami Airport, Hami	Westbound exit and eastbound entrance
Yizhou District, Hami, Xinjiang	Hami Service Area					
Yizhou District, Hami, Xinjiang				Hami	Xinjiang S303 – Hami	
Yizhou District, Hami, Xinjiang			3021	Hami Beijiao Rd.	Xinjiang S249 – Hami	
Yizhou District, Hami, Xinjiang			3044	Huoshiquan	G312 – Hami, Huoshiquan	Eastbound exit and westbound entrance
Yizhou District, Hami, Xinjiang			3053	Erpu	Erpu	
Yizhou District, Hami, Xinjiang	Erpu Toll Station					
Yizhou District, Hami, Xinjiang	Erpu Service Area					
Yizhou District, Hami, Xinjiang			3062	Dewaili	X094 – Dawalduruk	
Yizhou District, Hami, Xinjiang			3080	Liushuquan	X518 – Liushuquan	
Yizhou District, Hami, Xinjiang			3087	Shazaoquan	Shazaoquan	
Yizhou District, Hami, Xinjiang				East Sandaoling	Sandaoling	Westbound exit and eastbound entrance
Yizhou District, Hami, Xinjiang				West Sandaoling	Sandaoling	Eastbound exit and westbound entrance
Yizhou District, Hami, Xinjiang	Tiziquan Parking Area					
Yizhou District, Hami, Xinjiang			3117	Shadunzi	Shadunzi	
Yizhou District, Hami, Xinjiang	Liaodun Parking Area					
Yizhou District, Hami, Xinjiang	Yiwanquan Service Area					
Yizhou District, Hami, Xinjiang	Cheguluquan Parking Area					
Yizhou District, Hami, Xinjiang	Yakou Parking Area					
Yizhou District, Hami, Xinjiang			3198	Hongshankou	Xinjiang S238 – Hongshankou, Qijiaojing	
Yizhou District, Hami, Xinjiang	Yantian Parking Area					
Yizhou District, Hami, Xinjiang				Hongtai Gas-gathering Station	Hongtai Gas-gathering Station	
Shanshan County, Turpan, Xinjiang	Hongtai Paring Area					
Shanshan County, Turpan, Xinjiang	Sha'erhu Service Area					
Shanshan County, Turpan, Xinjiang	East Shanshan Toll Station					
Shanshan County, Turpan, Xinjiang	Service Area					
Shanshan County, Turpan, Xinjiang			3279	Nanhu	G312 / Xinjiang S241	
Shanshan County, Turpan, Xinjiang	Nanhu Service Area					
Shanshan County, Turpan, Xinjiang				Qiketai	X069 – Qiketai (Chiqtim)	
Shanshan County, Turpan, Xinjiang			3310	East Shanshan	X064 / G312 – East Shanshan	
Shanshan County, Turpan, Xinjiang			3327	Shanshan	Shanshan	
Shanshan County, Turpan, Xinjiang				Lianmuqin	G312 – Lianmuqin	
Shanshan County, Turpan, Xinjiang	Tuyugou Service Area					
Shanshan County, Turpan, Xinjiang				G312 – Turpan, Gaochang, Flaming Mountains		G7 and G30 Turpan section is under construction
Gaochang District, Turpan, Xinjiang	Service Area (U/C)					
Gaochang District, Turpan, Xinjiang	Service Area (U/C)					
Gaochang District, Turpan, Xinjiang						Under construction
Gaochang District, Turpan, Xinjiang	Service Area (U/C)					
Gaochang District, Turpan, Xinjiang				Xinjiang S242 – Turpan Jiaohe Airport		Under construction
Gaochang District, Turpan, Xinjiang	Service Area (U/C)					
Gaochang District, Turpan, Xinjiang	Service Area (U/C)					
Gaochang District, Turpan, Xinjiang				G312 / Xinjiang S301		Under construction
Gaochang District, Turpan, Xinjiang				G312 – Turpan, Gaochang, Flaming Mountains		G7 and G30 Turpan section is under construction
Toksun County, Turpan, Xinjiang				Xiaocaohu Interchange	G3012 – Toksun, Korla, Hotan	
Toksun County, Turpan, Xinjiang				Xiaocaohu	G312	
Toksun County, Turpan, Xinjiang	Xiaocaohu Service Area					
Toksun County, Turpan, Xinjiang	Xiaocaohu Toll Station					
Dabancheng District, Ürümqi, Xinjiang				G312 – Dabancheng		Westbound exit and eastbound entrance
Dabancheng District, Ürümqi, Xinjiang			3517	Dabancheng	G312 – Dabancheng	
Dabancheng District, Ürümqi, Xinjiang	Yanhu Service Area					
Dabancheng District, Ürümqi, Xinjiang			3526	Yanhu	G312 / G314 – Yanhu	
Dabancheng District, Ürümqi, Xinjiang	Yanhu Toll Station					
Dabancheng District, Ürümqi, Xinjiang			3552	Chaiwopu	G312 – Chaiwopu	
Dabancheng District, Ürümqi, Xinjiang			3569	Xinjiang Fertilizer Plant	G312 / G314	
Ürümqi County, Ürümqi, Xinjiang				Xinjiang S103		Eastbound exit and westbound entrance
Tianshan District, Ürümqi, Xinjiang	Wulabo Toll Station					
Tianshan District, Ürümqi, Xinjiang	Service Area					
Tianshan District, Ürümqi, Xinjiang				Ürümqi County	Xinjiang S116 – Ürümqi County	
Tianshan District, Ürümqi, Xinjiang				Wulabo Interchange	G7 / G3003 – Downtown Ürümqi, Fukang	West end of G7 concurrency
Saybagh District, Ürümqi, Xinjiang	West Wulabo (Main-line) Toll Station					
Saybagh District, Ürümqi, Xinjiang				Cangfanggou	G216 – Saybagh, Ürümqi	
Saybagh District, Ürümqi, Xinjiang				Bingtuan Jiaotong	Dong'an Road	
Saybagh District, Ürümqi, Xinjiang			3603	Xishan Interchange	Xishan Elevated Road – Downtown Ürümqi; Xinjiang S105 – Xishan, Jiuding	
Xinshi District, Ürümqi, Xinjiang			3608	Xinyi Road	Wansheng Street – Bainiaohu New Area	
Toutunhe District, Ürümqi, Xinjiang				Beijing Road, Bagang	Lushan Street – Downtown Ürümqi; Xiangyun E. Street – Toutunhe (Tudunghaba)	
Toutunhe District, Ürümqi, Xinjiang			3616	Xizhan Interchange	Xinjiang S114 (Wukui Expressway) – Ürümqi Diwopu International Airport, Midong (Miqüen)	
Toutunhe District, Ürümqi, Xinjiang			3620	Sanping	Xinjiang S104 – Ba Yi Steel (Bagang)	
Toutunhe District, Ürümqi, Xinjiang	Sanping Service Area					
Toutunhe District, Ürümqi, Xinjiang	Toutunhe Toll Station					
Changji, Changji Prefecture, Xinjiang			3632	Changji	Beijing S. Road – Changji	
Changji, Changji Prefecture, Xinjiang				X120		Under construction
Changji, Changji Prefecture, Xinjiang						Under construction
Changji, Changji Prefecture, Xinjiang	Service Area					
Changji, Changji Prefecture, Xinjiang						Under construction
Hutubi County, Changji Prefecture, Xinjiang				Hutubi	Tianshanxue Avenue – Hutubi (Kutubi); G312	
Hutubi County, Changji Prefecture, Xinjiang	Wugongtai Service Area					
Hutubi County, Changji Prefecture, Xinjiang				Wugongtai	G312 / Xinjiang S201 – Wugongtai, Dafeng	
Manas County, Changji Prefecture, Xinjiang	Service Area					
Manas County, Changji Prefecture, Xinjiang						Under construction
Manas County, Changji Prefecture, Xinjiang	Manas Toll Station					
Manas County, Changji Prefecture, Xinjiang				Manas	Biyu Avenue – Manas	
Shihezi, Xinjiang				Shihezi	Shuangyong Road – Shihezi	
Shihezi, Xinjiang	Shihezi Service Area					
Shihezi, Xinjiang						Under construction
Shawan County, Tacheng Prefecture, Xinjiang				Wulanwusu	Xinjiang S223 – Wulanwusu (Ulan'us)	
Shawan County, Tacheng Prefecture, Xinjiang	Service Area					
Shawan County, Tacheng Prefecture, Xinjiang				Shawan	X814 (Yingbin Road) – Shawan	
Shawan County, Tacheng Prefecture, Xinjiang				Shawan (W)	Ürümqi W. Road – Shawan	Eastbound exit and westbound entrance
Shawan County, Tacheng Prefecture, Xinjiang	Service Area					
Shawan County, Tacheng Prefecture, Xinjiang				Anjihai	Xinjiang S224 – Anjihai	
Kuytun, Ili Prefecture, Xinjiang						Under construction
Kuytun, Ili Prefecture, Xinjiang	Kuytun Service Area					
Kuytun, Ili Prefecture, Xinjiang						Under construction
Kuytun, Ili Prefecture, Xinjiang	Kuytun Toll Station					
Kuytun, Ili Prefecture, Xinjiang				Kuytun	Xinjiang S218 (Yingbin Avenue) – Kuytun, Dushanzi (Maytag)	
Kuytun, Ili Prefecture, Xinjiang				Dushanzi	G3014 / G217 (Youcheng Road) – Karamay, Altay City, Tacheng, Dushanzi (Maytag)	
Wusu, Tacheng Prefecture, Xinjiang	Wusu Toll Station					
Wusu, Tacheng Prefecture, Xinjiang				East Wusu	Xinjiang S115 – Wusu	
Wusu, Tacheng Prefecture, Xinjiang				Xidagou	X795 – Wusu, Xidagou	
Wusu, Tacheng Prefecture, Xinjiang	Hongxing Service Area					
Wusu, Tacheng Prefecture, Xinjiang				Hongxing Farm	G312 / X796	
Wusu, Tacheng Prefecture, Xinjiang				Gaoquan	G312 – Gaoquan	
Wusu, Tacheng Prefecture, Xinjiang	Service Area					
Wusu, Tacheng Prefecture, Xinjiang				Guertu	Guertu	
Jinghe County, Bortala Prefecture, Xinjiang				Tuotuo	Tuotuo	
Jinghe County, Bortala Prefecture, Xinjiang	Tuotuo Service Area					
Jinghe County, Bortala Prefecture, Xinjiang				Shaquanzi		
Jinghe County, Bortala Prefecture, Xinjiang	Shaquanzi Parking Area					
Jinghe County, Bortala Prefecture, Xinjiang				Jinghe Aobao	Jinghe Railway Station	
Jinghe County, Bortala Prefecture, Xinjiang				G3018 – Alashankou		G3018 under construction
Jinghe County, Bortala Prefecture, Xinjiang				Jinghe	Tuanjie S. Road – Jinghe (Jing)	
Jinghe County, Bortala Prefecture, Xinjiang	Bajiahu Service Area					
Jinghe County, Bortala Prefecture, Xinjiang				Regiment 83	Tuoli	
Jinghe County, Bortala Prefecture, Xinjiang				Daheyanzi	X200 – Daheyanzi	
Jinghe County, Bortala Prefecture, Xinjiang	Wutai Parking Area					
Jinghe County, Bortala Prefecture, Xinjiang				Wutai	Wutai	
Jinghe County, Bortala Prefecture, Xinjiang				Bole Fork	Xinjiang S205 – Bole	
Jinghe County, Bortala Prefecture, Xinjiang	Wutai Service Area					
Jinghe County, Bortala Prefecture, Xinjiang	Sitai Parking Area					
Jinghe County, Bortala Prefecture, Xinjiang	Sayram Lake Service Area					
Jinghe County, Bortala Prefecture, Xinjiang				Sayram Lake	Sayram Lake Scenic Area	
Huocheng County, Ili Prefecture, Xinjiang	Guozigou Toll Station					
Huocheng County, Ili Prefecture, Xinjiang	Guozigou Service Area					
Huocheng County, Ili Prefecture, Xinjiang				Guozigou	Guozigou	Westbound exit only
Huocheng County, Ili Prefecture, Xinjiang				Lucaogou	G312 – Lucaogou	
Huocheng County, Ili Prefecture, Xinjiang				G3016 – Huocheng (Korgas), Yining		
Huocheng County, Ili Prefecture, Xinjiang				Qingshuihe	G218 / X729 – Qingshuihe, Daxigou	
Huocheng County, Ili Prefecture, Xinjiang				Qingshuihe (W)	G312 – Qingshuihe	Eastbound exit and westbound entrance
Khorgas, Ili Prefecture, Xinjiang				Mohu'er	X120 – Mohu'er Pasture	
Khorgas, Ili Prefecture, Xinjiang	Service Area					
Khorgas, Ili Prefecture, Xinjiang				Xinjiang S213 – Regiment 62		Crossing
Khorgas, Ili Prefecture, Xinjiang						Under construction
Continues as G312 towards Khorgas Port (Kazakhstan border)
Closed/former; Concurrency terminus; HOV only; Incomplete access; Tolled; Route transition; Unopened
