= China National Highway 310 =

Road in China

National Highway 310
- 310国道

Route information
- Length: 1,613 km (1,002 mi)

Major junctions
- From: Lianyungang, Jiangsu
- To: Tianshui, Gansu

Location
- Country: China

Highway system
- National Trunk Highway System; Primary; Auxiliary
| ← G309 | → G311 |

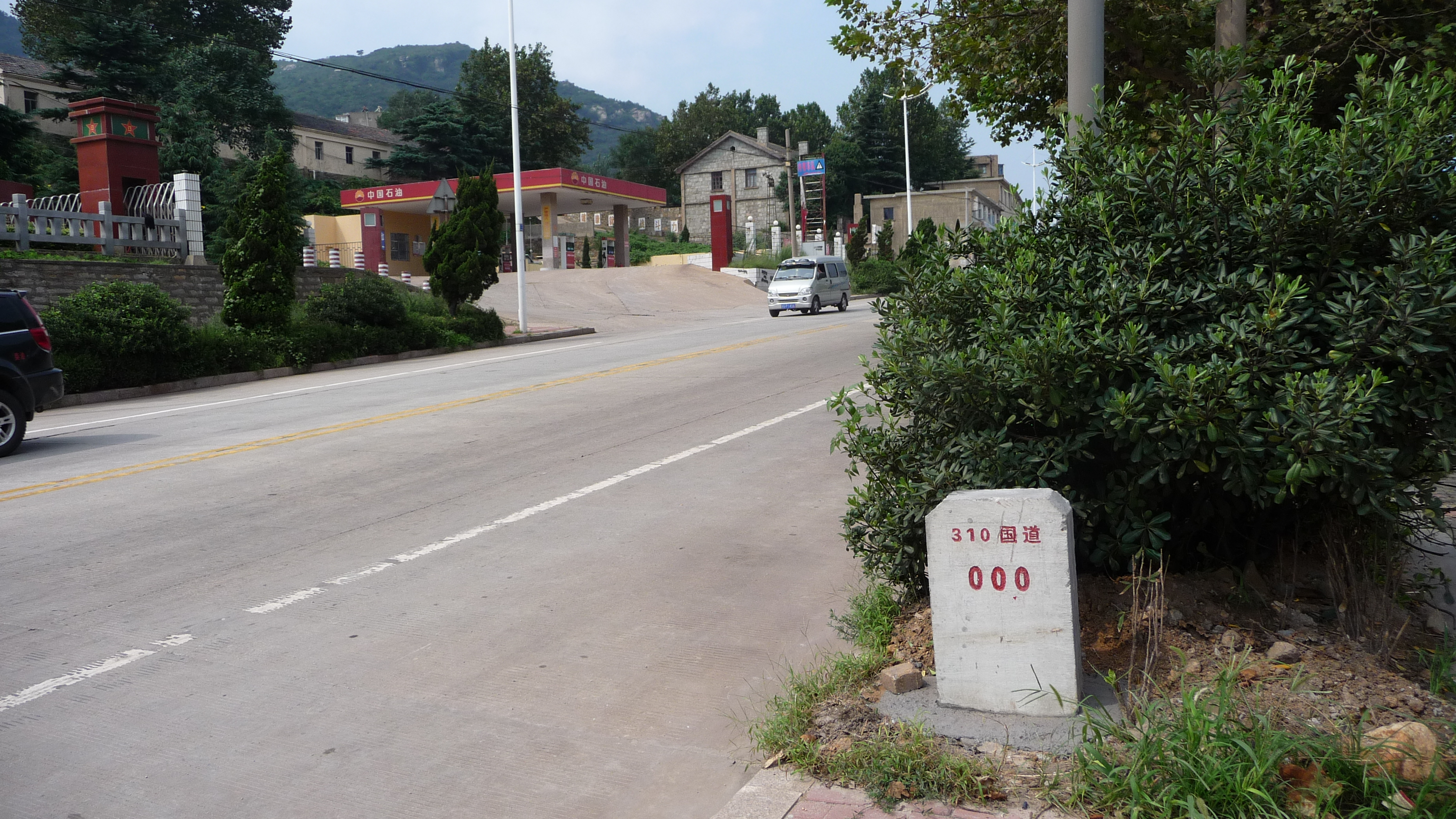
The starting of G310

China National Highway 310 (G310) runs northwest from Lianyungang, Jiangsu towards Anhui, Henan, Shaanxi provinces, and ends in Tianshui, Gansu. It was originally 1613 kilometres in length, but was later extended westward to Gonghe County in Qinghai.

It runs parallel to the important G30 Lianyungang–Khorgas Expressway and Longhai railway east-west transport corridors.

== Route and distance ==
Route and distance

| City | Distance (km) |
|---|---|
| Lianyun District, Lianyungang, Jiangsu | 0 |
| Lianyungang, Jiangsu | 37 |
| Xuzhou, Jiangsu | 262 |
| Dangshan, Anhui | 346 |
| Shangqiu, Henan | 411 |
| Minquan, Henan | 465 |
| Lankao, Henan | 504 |
| Kaifeng, Henan | 552 |
| Zhongmu, Henan | 584 |
| Zhengzhou, Henan | 622 |
| Xingyang, Henan | 649 |
| Gongyi, Henan | 701 |
| Yanshi, Henan | 741 |
| Luoyang, Henan | 777 |
| Xin'an, Henan | 824 |
| Yima, Henan | 855 |
| Mianchi, Henan | 866 |
| Sanmenxia, Henan | 929 |
| Shanzhou District, Sanmenxia, Henan | 953 |
| Lingbao, Henan | 989 |
| Tongguan, Shaanxi | 1063 |
| Huayin, Shaanxi | 1092 |
| Huazhou District, Weinan, Shaanxi | 1131 |
| Weinan, Shaanxi | 1161 |
| Lintong District, Xi'an, Shaanxi | 1193 |
| Xi'an, Shaanxi | 1216 |
| Zhouzhi, Shaanxi | 1284 |
| Mei County, Shaanxi | 1332 |
| Baoji, Shaanxi | 1399 |
| Tianshui, Gansu | 1613 |
| Qin'an, Gansu | |
| Tongwei, Gansu | |
| Gonghe, Gansu | |

== See also ==
- China National Highways
