= G3003 Ürümqi Ring Expressway =

Orbital road in Anhui, China

Ürümqi Ring Expressway
- 乌鲁木齐绕城高速公路

Route information
- Auxiliary route of G30
- Length: 174.39 km (108.36 mi)

Location
- Country: China

Highway system
- National Trunk Highway System; Primary; Auxiliary; National Highways; Transport in China
← G3002	→ G3011

The G3003 Ürümqi Ring Expressway (Chinese: 乌鲁木齐绕城高速公路) is a ring expressway around the main urban area of Ürümqi, Xinjiang, China.

On 3 June 2010, the Ministry of Transport had agreed to the construction of the highway project and would include it in the 12th Five-Year Plan. Before construction began, it was reported that the estimated cost of the project was nearly 50 billion yuan.

== Route ==
The expressway is formed by an east and west section, and it connects to the G7 Jingxin Expressway and the G30 Lianhuo Expressway. The route passes through the districts of Midong, Shuimogou, Dabancheng, Tianshan and Saybag.
