= Hsin-an =

Hsin-an may refer to:

- Xin'an County
- Bao'an County, Guangdong
