= AH67 =

Road in Asia

Asian Highway 67 (AH67) is a road in the Asian Highway Network running 2,288 kilometres (1,422 mi) from Kuytun, Xinjiang, China to Jezkazgan, Kazakhstan connecting AH5 to AH62. The route is as follows:

== China ==
- G3014: Kuytun - Karamay - Sanping
- G3015: Sanping - Tacheng
- S211: Tacheng - Baketu

== Kazakhstan ==
- A 8 A8 Highway: Bakhty - Taskesken
- A 3 A3 Highway: Taskesken - Kalbatay
- M 38 M38 Highway: Kalbatay - Semey - Pavlodar
- A 17 A17 Highway: Pavlodar - Karaganda - Jezkazgan
