= Mochuan River =

River

Coordinates: 25°40′50″N 110°43′21″E

The Mochuan River (Chinese: 漠川河) is a right-bank tributary of the upper Xiang River in Xin'an County, Guangxi, China. The river rises in the west of Panhuang Temple (Chinese: 盘皇殿) in Mochuan Township (Chinese: 漠川乡) and flows south to north, joining the Xiang at Qukou (Chinese: 渠口) of Yujiang Village (Chinese: 渔江村), Xiangli Town (Chinese: 湘漓镇). The Mochuan River has a length of 60 kilometres (37 mi); its drainage basin covers an area of 416 square kilometres (161 sq mi).
