= Guozigou Bridge =

Guozigou Bridge Talki Bridge 果子沟大桥 تەلكى كۆۋرۈكى
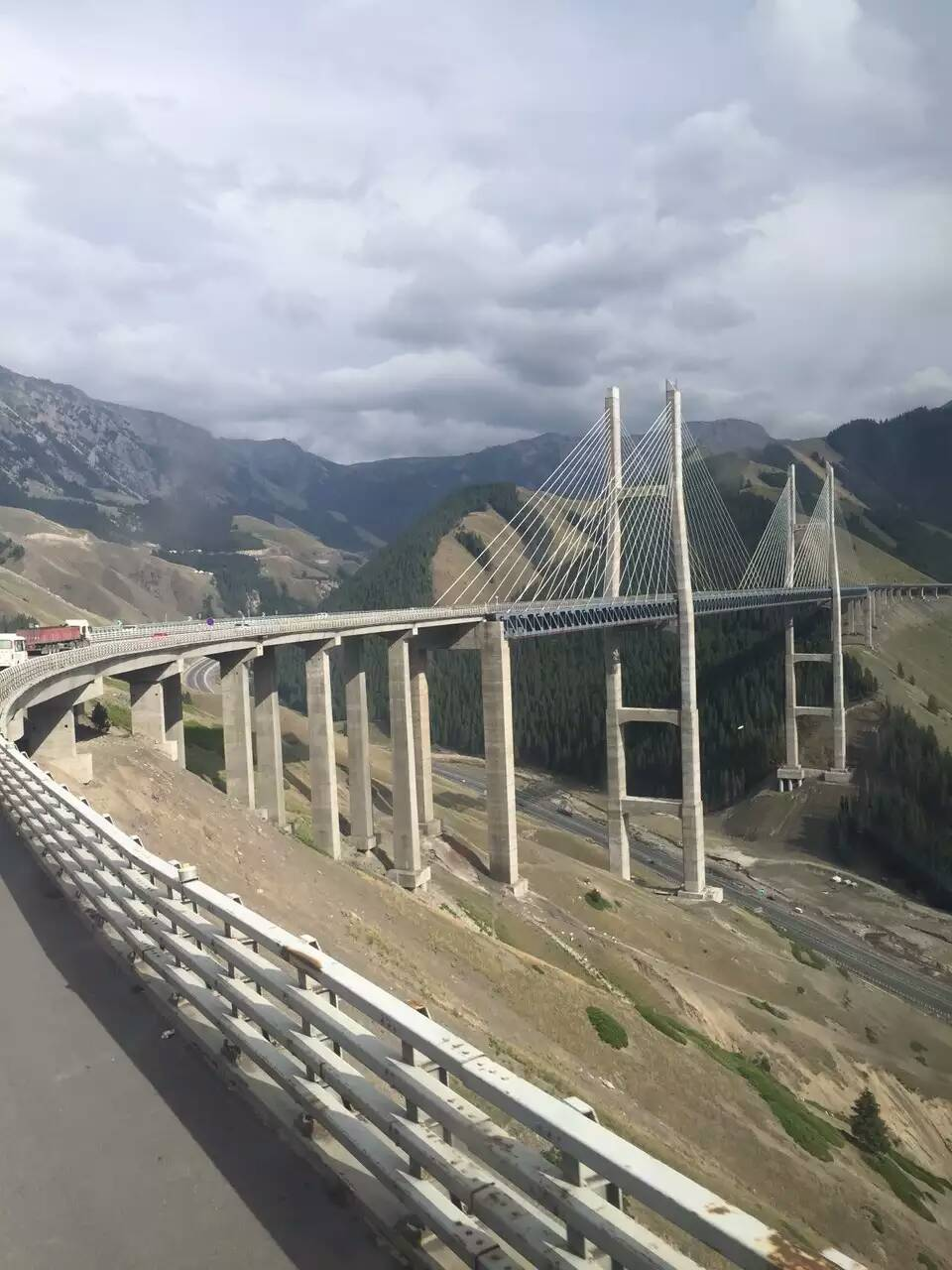
- The Guozigou Bridge
- Coordinates: 44°28′15″N 81°08′25″E
- Carries: G30 Lianhuo Expressway
- Locale: Huocheng County, Xinjiang

Characteristics
- Design: Cable stayed bridge
- Height: 209.5 m (687 ft)
- Longest span: 360 m (1,181 ft)
- Clearance below: 180 m (591 ft)

History
- Opened: 2011

Location
- Interactive map of Guozigou Bridge; Talki Bridge

The Guozigou Bridge or Talki Bridge (تەلكى كۆۋرۈكى, Талки Коврук) is a cable stayed bridge with a main span of 360 metres (1,180 ft). The bridge was opened in 2011 and forms part of G30 Lianyungang–Khorgas Expressway in Huocheng County, Xinjiang. The bridge forms part of a spiral crossing over the expressway 180 metres (590 ft) below. The bridge and associated spiral allow for navigatable gradients.

== Gallery ==
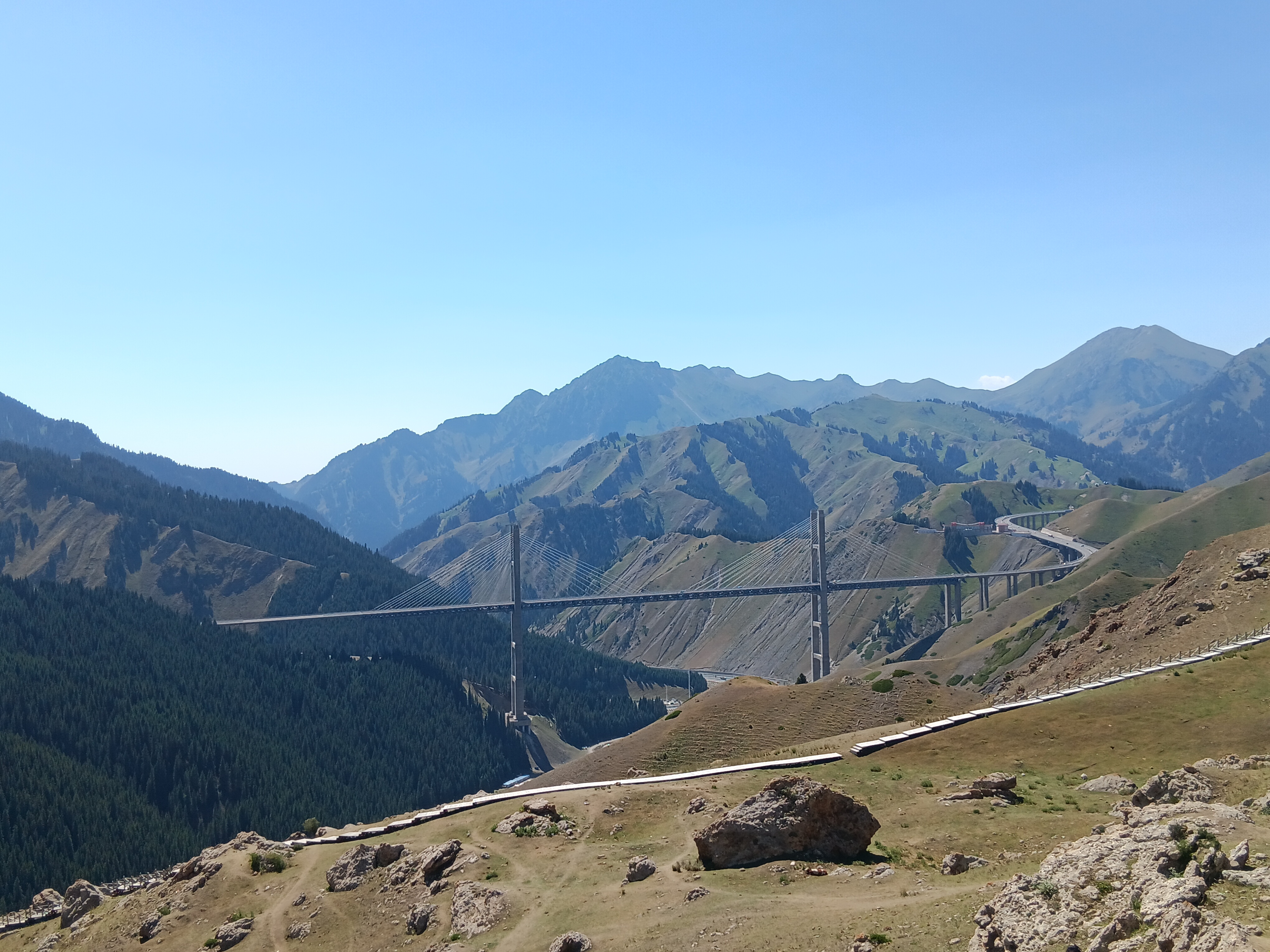
Far view of Guozigou Bridge

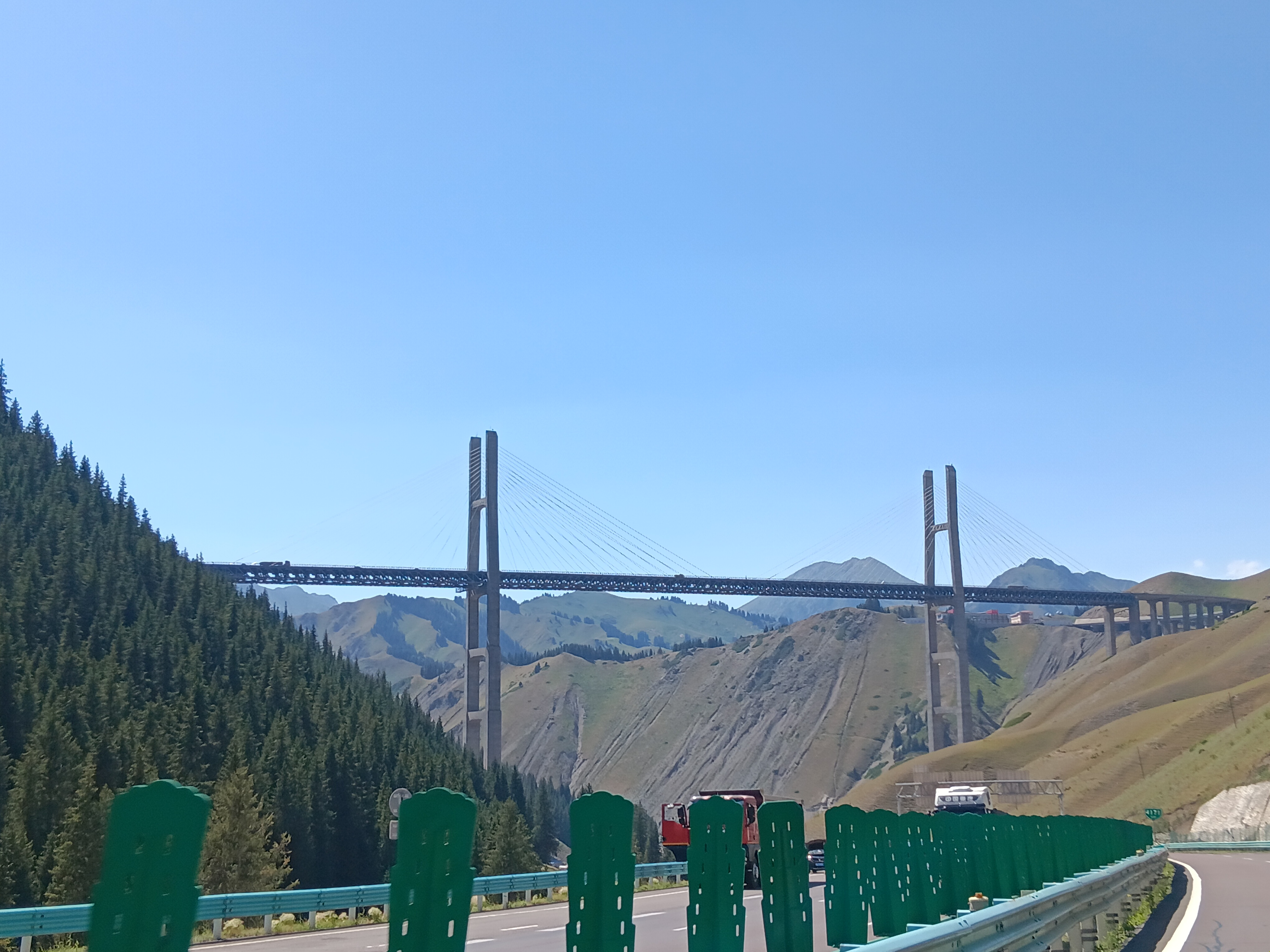
Bridge seen from the G30 expressway below

== See also ==
- List of bridges in China
- List of longest cable-stayed bridge spans
- List of highest bridges
- List of tallest bridges
