= G3014 Kuytun–Altay Expressway =

Road in China

Kuytun–Altay Expressway
- كۇيتۇن-ئالتاي چىڭسىخوزا-غۇلجا
- Kui'a Expressway 奎阿高速公路

Route information
- Auxiliary route of G30
- Part of AH67
- Length: 527 km (327 mi)
- Existed: July 1, 2014–present

Major junctions
- South end: G30 / G217 / G312 in Kuytun, Ili Kazakh Autonomous Prefecture, Xinjiang
- G3015 in Karamay; G216 in Beitun
- North end: Xinjiang S230 in Altay, Altay Prefecture, Xinjiang

Location
- Country: China

Highway system
- National Trunk Highway System; Primary; Auxiliary; National Highways; Transport in China
← G3013	→ G3015

The G3014 Kuytun–Altay Expressway (Chinese: 奎屯—阿勒泰高速公路, Uyghur: كۇيتۇن-ئالتاي يۇقىرى سۈرئەتلىك تاشيولى), commonly referred to as the Kui'a Expressway (Chinese: 奎阿高速公路), is an expressway that connects the cities of Kuytun and Altay in Xinjiang, China. The expressway is 527 kilometres (327 mi) in length, with a 135-kilometre-long (84 mi) section between Kuytun and Karamay that is concurrent with the G3015 Kuytun–Tacheng Expressway. The entire expressway is part of Asian Highway 67.

The expressway is a spur or auxiliary line of the G30 Lianyungang–Khorgas Expressway. It connects to the G30 Lianyungang–Khorgas Expressway at Kuytun.

== History ==
The first section of the expressway, from Kuytun to Karamay, which is concurrent with G3015 Kuytun–Tacheng Expressway, opened on October 13, 2012. The section from Karamay to Altay opened on July 1, 2014, fully completing the expressway.
