= AH34 =

Road in China

Asian Highway 34
- Map of AH34 in red
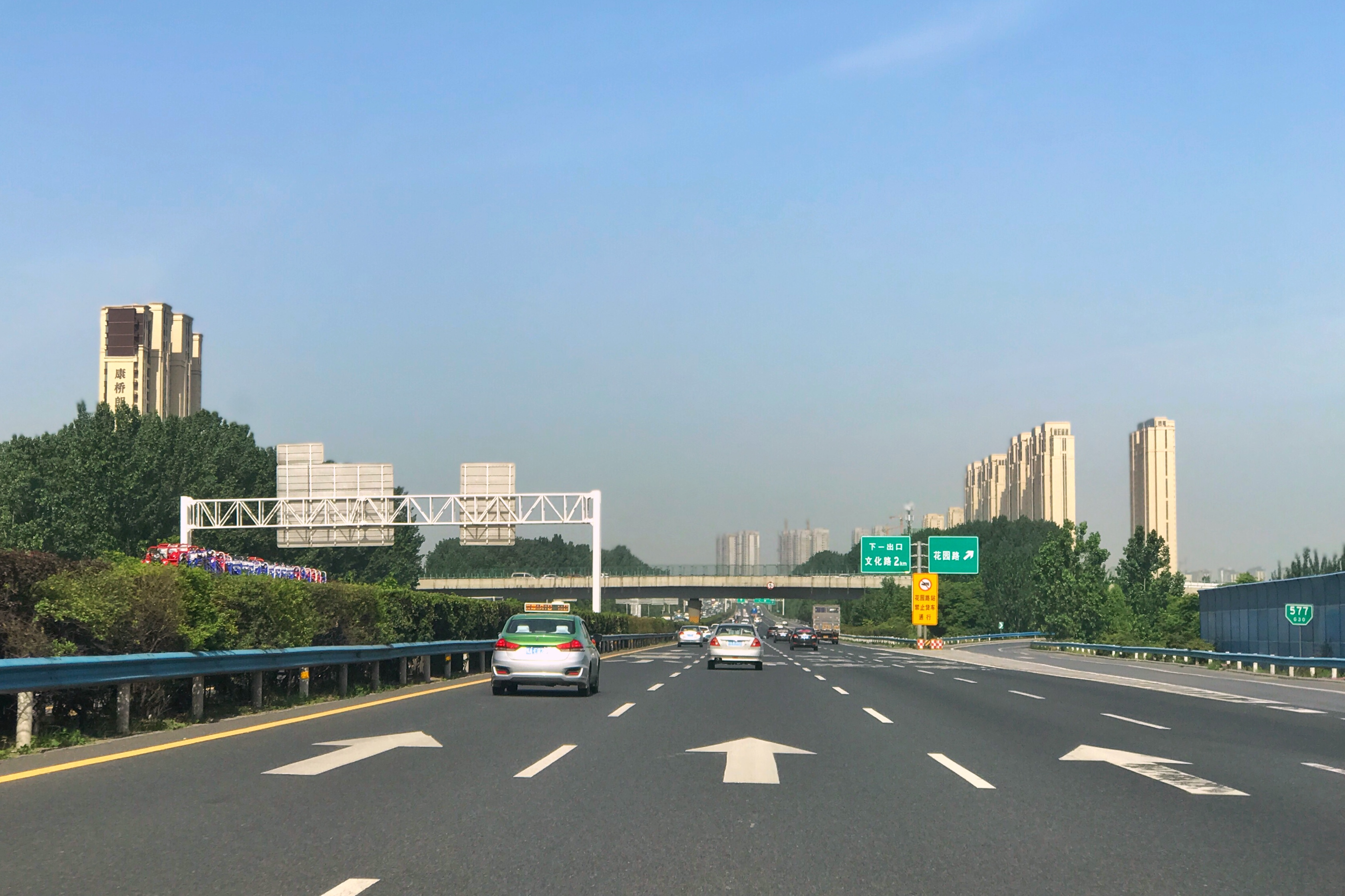
- AH34 near Zhengzhou

Major junctions
- East end: Lianyungang, China
- West end: Xi'an, China

Location
- Countries: China

Highway system
- Asian Highway Network
← AH33	→ AH35

Asian Highway 34 (AH34) is an east–west route of the Asian Highway Network, running 1,033 km (642 miles) from Lianyungang, China, through four provinces: Jiangsu, Anhui, Henan, Shaanxi, ending at AH5 in Xi'an, Shaanxi.

== China ==
- G30: Lianyungang - Zhengzhou - Xi'an.

== Junctions ==
AH1 Zhengzhou
AH5 Xi'an
