= A3 highway (Kazakhstan) =

Highway in Kazakhstan

H3 highway

Route information
- Part of E40

- Part of AH67
- Length: 1,212 km (753 mi)

Major junctions
- From: Almaty
- To: Oskemen

Location
- Country: Kazakhstan

Highway system
- Transport in Kazakhstan
← A 2	→ A 4

A3 is a national highway in Kazakhstan that runs from Almaty to Oskemen with a total length of 1,212 kilometres (753 mi).

The route starts in Almaty, where it goes north and passes cities of Kapchagay, Taldyqorgan and settlements of Sarqan, Ayagoz and Qalbatau until it reaches its destination in Oskemen.

== History ==
In years 2013 to 2016 the Almaty - Kapchagay section was reconstructed.

In 2017 the reconstruction of the Taldyqorgan - Oskemen section had started and the next year the Almaty - Kapchagay section became a toll road.
