= G3011 Liuyuan–Golmud Expressway =

Road in China

Liuyuan–Golmud Expressway
- 柳园－格尔木高速公路
- Liuge Expressway 柳格高速公路

Route information
- Auxiliary route of G30

Major junctions
- North end: Liuyuan, Guazhou County, Jiuquan, Gansu
- South end: G109 in Golmud, Haixi, Qinghai

Location
- Country: China

Highway system
- National Trunk Highway System; Primary; Auxiliary; National Highways; Transport in China
| ← G3003 | → G3012 |

The G3011 Liuyuan–Golmud Expressway (Chinese: 柳园—格尔木高速公路), commonly referred to as the Liuge Expressway (Chinese: 柳格高速公路), is a expressway in China that connects Liuyuan, a town in Guazhou County, Jiuquan, Gansu, and Golmud, Haixi Mongol and Tibetan Autonomous Prefecture, Qinghai.

The expressway is a spur or auxiliary line of the G30 Lianyungang–Khorgas Expressway, and connects to the main line at Liuyuan. It parallels the route of China National Highway 215.

The expressway connects the following cities:

- Liuyuan, Guazhou County, Jiuquan, Gansu
- Dunhuang, Jiuquan, Gansu
- Golmud, Haixi Mongol and Tibetan Autonomous Prefecture, Qinghai
