= G3002 Xi'an Ring Expressway =

Road in China

Xi'an Ring Expressway
- 西安绕城高速公路

Route information
- Length: 88 km (55 mi)
- Existed: October 2000–present

Major junctions
- Orbital around Xi'an
- G65 G5; G30; G40; G70; G65 G22

Location
- Country: China

Highway system
- National Trunk Highway System; Primary; Auxiliary; National Highways; Transport in China
← G3001	→ G3003

The G3002 Xi'an Ring Expressway is an 88 km (55 mi) long expressway ring road encircling Xi'an, the capital of Shaanxi, China. It is also known as the third ring road of Xi'an, the first two being formed by the road around the city walls, and the second being a grade separated trunk road not built to expressway standards. Every section of the road is also part of a through route of the National Trunk Highway System.

The entire ring is tolled, with toll planned to be abolished in September 2023.

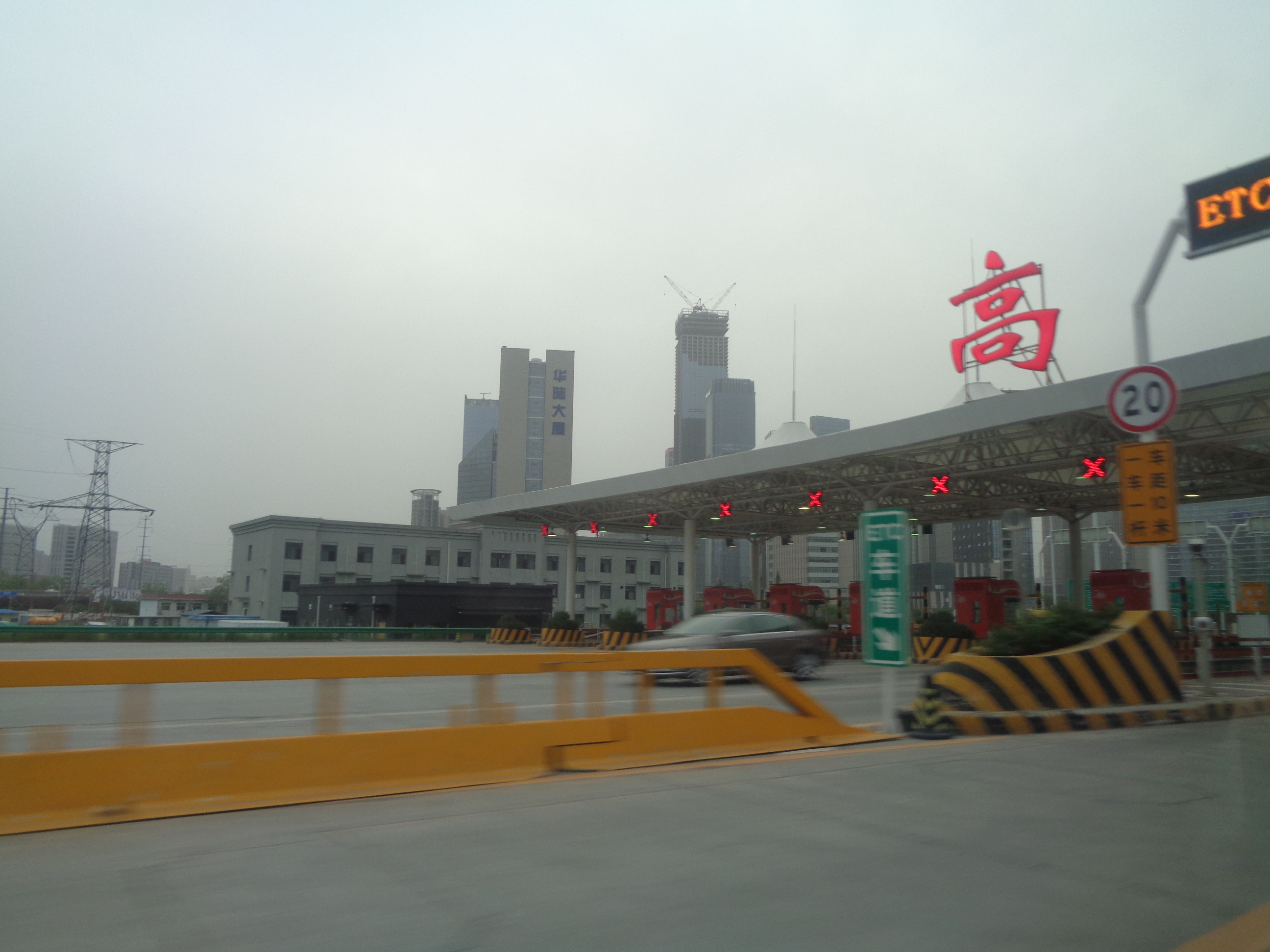
Toll station

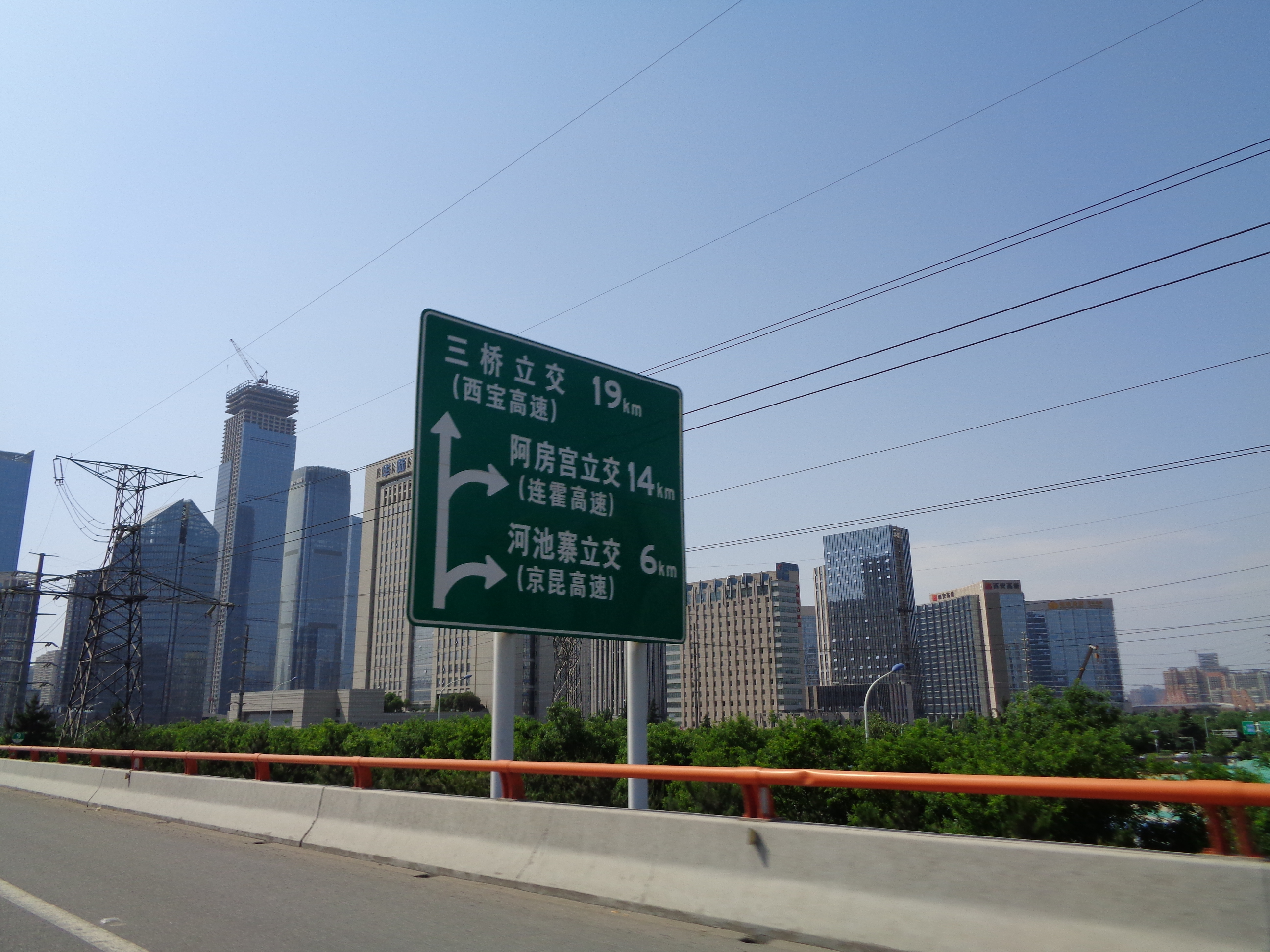
Exit sign showing several connecting expressway junctions ahead
