= Yanshi =

Yanshi may refer to:

- Cao Mao (241–260), courtesy name Yanshi (Chinese: 彥士), fourth emperor of Cao Wei
- Yanshi, Luoyang (Chinese: 偃师区), district of Luoyang city, Anhui province, China

- Battle of Yanshi, 518 AD battle in the modern-day district
- Yanshi railway station, railway station in the district

- Yanzhou–Shijiusuo railway (also known as "Yanshi"), a railroad line in Shandong province, China
