= G3015 Kuytun–Tacheng Expressway =

Road in China

Kuytun–Tacheng Expressway
- كۇيتۇن-چۆچەك چىڭسىخوزا-غۇلجا
- Kuita Expressway 奎塔高速公路

Route information
- Auxiliary route of G30
- Length: 368 km (229 mi)

Major junctions
- Southeast end: G30 / G217 / G312 in Kuytun, Ili Kazakh Autonomous Prefecture, Xinjiang
- G3014 in Karamay
- Northwest end: G335 in Tacheng, Tacheng Prefecture, Xinjiang

Location
- Country: China

Highway system
- National Trunk Highway System; Primary; Auxiliary; National Highways; Transport in China
← G3014	→ G3016

The G3015 Kuytun–Tacheng Expressway (Chinese: 奎屯—塔城高速公路, Uyghur: كۇيتۇن-چۆچەك يۇقىرى سۈرئەتلىك تاشيولى), commonly referred to as the Kuita Expressway (Chinese: 奎塔高速公路), is an expressway that connects the cities of Kuytun and Tacheng in the Chinese autonomous region of Xinjiang. It is 368 kilometres (229 mi) in length. The expressway is a spur or auxiliary line of the G30 Lianyungang–Khorgas Expressway. In the southeastern end, it connects to the G30 Lianyungang–Khorgas Expressway at Kuytun. In the northwestern end, it terminates at Xinjiang Provincial Highway 221 in Tacheng, close to the Bakhtu border crossing (Chinese: 巴克图口岸) on the China–Kazakhstan border.

== Description ==
The expressway comprises two sections. The first section between Kuytun and Karamay is known as the Kuytun–Karamay Expressway (Chinese: 奎屯–克拉玛依高速公路), or Kuike Expressway (Chinese: 奎克高速公路) for short. It opened on October 13, 2012, and is also designated as part of the G3014 Kuytun–Altay Expressway.

The second section from Karamay to Tacheng is known as the Karamay–Tacheng Expressway (Chinese: 克拉玛依–塔城高速公路), or Keta Expressway (Chinese: 克塔高速公路) for short. It opened on November 30, 2014.
