= Mianchi County =

Mianchi County 渑池县 Mienchih
- County
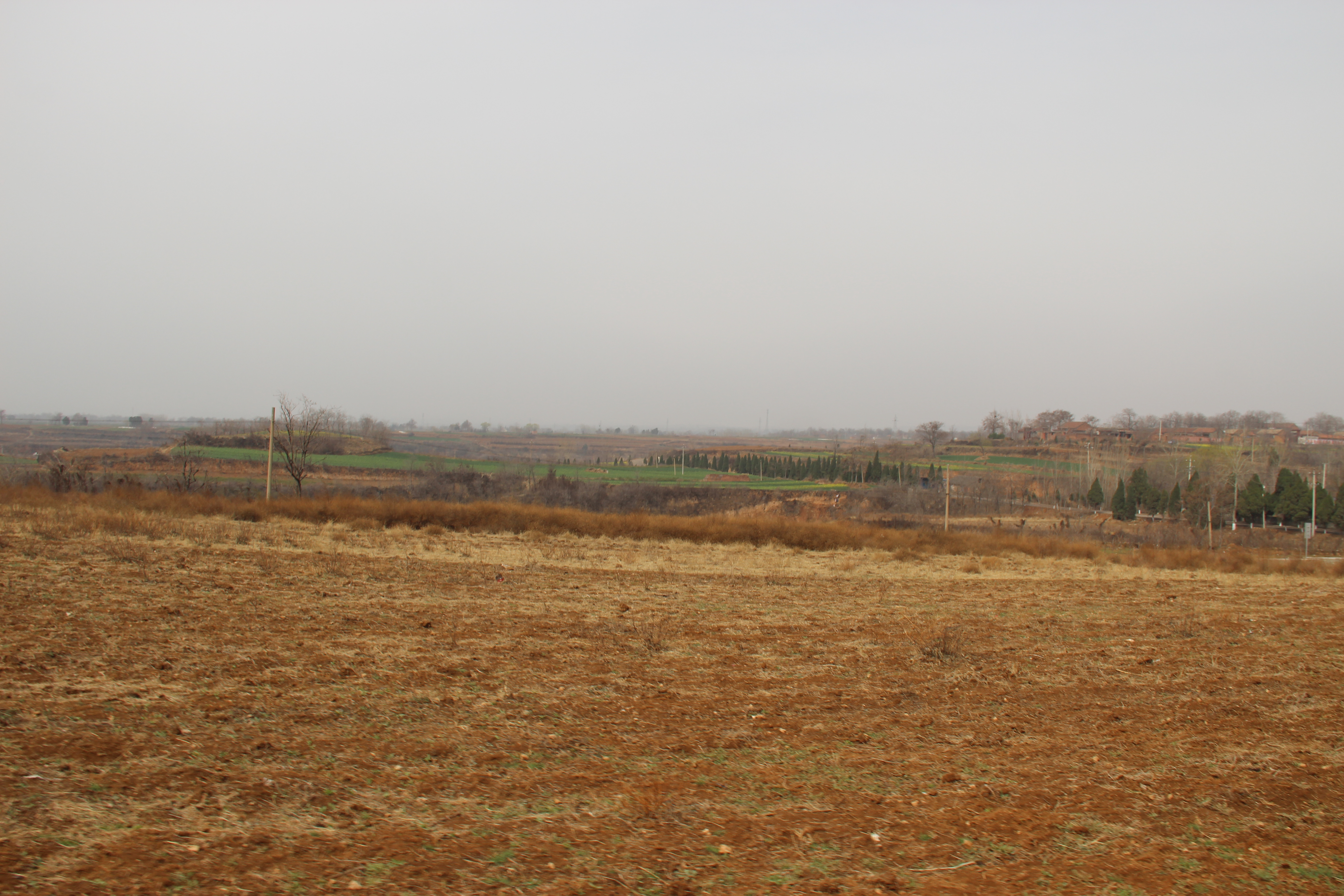
- Near Yangshao town

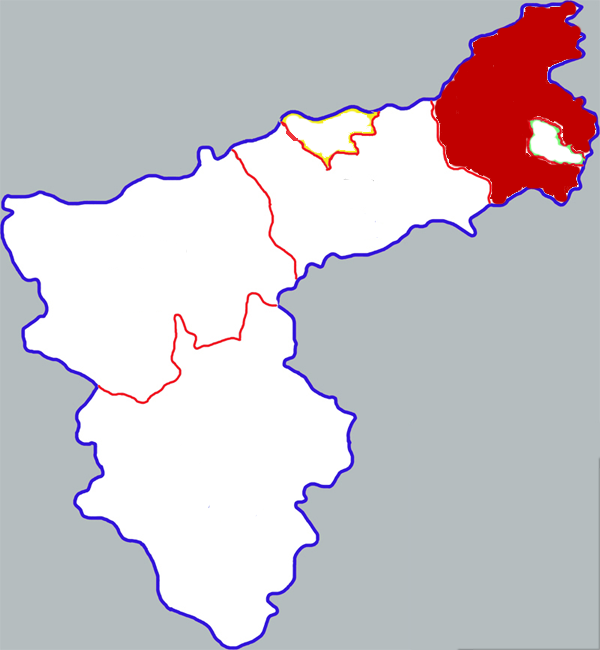
- Mianchi in Sanmenxia

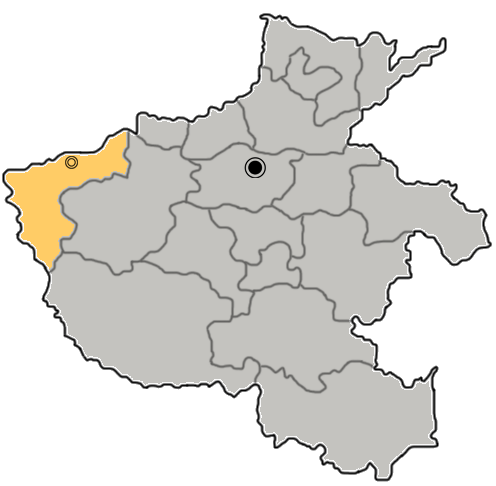
- Sanmenxia in Henan
- Coordinates: 34°46′01″N 111°45′43″E
- Country: People's Republic of China
- Province: Henan
- Prefecture-level city: Sanmenxia

Area
  - Total: 1,421 km^{2} (549 sq mi)

Population (2019)
  - Total: 353,200
  - Density: 248.6/km^{2} (643.8/sq mi)
- Time zone: UTC+8 (China Standard)
- Postal code: 472400

Mianchi County
- Traditional Chinese: 澠池縣
- Simplified Chinese: 渑池县
Transcriptions
Standard Mandarin
- Hanyu Pinyin: Miǎnchí Xiàn
Yue: Cantonese
- Jyutping: man^{5}ci^{4} jyun^{2}

Mianchi County is a county under the jurisdiction of the prefecture-level city of Sanmenxia, in the northwest of Henan province, bordering Shanxi province to the north and northwest. Its population in 2019 was 353,200.

== History ==
Mianchi is known for the ancient Yangshao Culture, the remains of which were first found by Swedish geologist Johan Gunnar Andersson. In 1921, he discovered some pieces of pottery in the north of Mianchi County, near the town of Yangshao.

In 2006, the government of Mianchi County experimented with direct democracy, allowing citizens to voice their thoughts about proposed projects through petitions.

== Administrative divisions ==
As of 2020, Mianchi is divided in 6 towns and 6 townships.

Towns

- Chengguan (城关镇)
- Yinghao (英豪镇)
- Zhangcun (张村镇)
- Hongyang (洪阳镇)
- Tianchi (天池镇)
- Yangshao (仰韶镇)

Townships

- Rencun Township (仁村乡)
- Guoyuan Township (果园乡)
- Chencun Township (陈村乡)
- Potou Township (坡头乡)
- Duancun Township (段村乡)
- Nancun Township (南村乡)

== Climate ==
Climate data for Mianchi, elevation 542 m (1,778 ft), (1991–2020 normals, extremes 1981–2010)
Month	Jan	Feb	Mar	Apr	May	Jun	Jul	Aug	Sep	Oct	Nov	Dec	Year
Record high °C (°F)	16.9 (62.4)	23.9 (75.0)	30.0 (86.0)	37.3 (99.1)	39.4 (102.9)	40.4 (104.7)	39.6 (103.3)	37.8 (100.0)	38.7 (101.7)	31.7 (89.1)	27.5 (81.5)	19.7 (67.5)	40.4 (104.7)
Mean daily maximum °C (°F)	4.6 (40.3)	7.8 (46.0)	15.3 (59.5)	21.3 (70.3)	26.3 (79.3)	30.3 (86.5)	30.6 (87.1)	29.2 (84.6)	24.3 (75.7)	19.4 (66.9)	12.2 (54.0)	6.7 (44.1)	19.0 (66.2)
Daily mean °C (°F)	−1.1 (30.0)	1.9 (35.4)	8.4 (47.1)	14.4 (57.9)	19.7 (67.5)	24.2 (75.6)	25.6 (78.1)	24.3 (75.7)	19.3 (66.7)	13.6 (56.5)	6.8 (44.2)	0.9 (33.6)	13.2 (55.7)
Mean daily minimum °C (°F)	−5.4 (22.3)	−2.5 (27.5)	2.8 (37.0)	8.1 (46.6)	13.4 (56.1)	18.2 (64.8)	21.4 (70.5)	20.4 (68.7)	15.4 (59.7)	9.1 (48.4)	2.6 (36.7)	−3.4 (25.9)	8.3 (47.0)
Record low °C (°F)	−16.9 (1.6)	−18.5 (−1.3)	−9.6 (14.7)	−3.2 (26.2)	2.5 (36.5)	8.7 (47.7)	13.1 (55.6)	11.9 (53.4)	4.8 (40.6)	−2.8 (27.0)	−12.1 (10.2)	−14.3 (6.3)	−18.5 (−1.3)
Average precipitation mm (inches)	9.6 (0.38)	13.5 (0.53)	22.4 (0.88)	36.5 (1.44)	58.4 (2.30)	71.8 (2.83)	112.7 (4.44)	91.4 (3.60)	87.8 (3.46)	49.4 (1.94)	26.4 (1.04)	6.5 (0.26)	586.4 (23.1)
Average precipitation days (≥ 0.1 mm)	4.2	4.7	5.8	6.7	7.6	8.5	11.3	10.7	10.1	7.6	5.7	3.2	86.1
Average snowy days	5.3	4.8	2.3	0.4	0	0	0	0	0	0	1.8	3.6	18.2
Average relative humidity (%)	53	55	55	57	59	61	75	78	75	69	63	53	63
Mean monthly sunshine hours	159.1	154.8	187.2	213.1	229.2	211.2	184.4	180.8	157.8	164.9	163.7	165.7	2,171.9
Percentage possible sunshine	51	50	50	54	53	49	42	44	43	48	53	55	49
Source: China Meteorological Administration

== Economy ==
Mianchi is wealthy in resources, having coal resources are up to 1.19 billion tons. It has 11.5 million tons of Bauxite resources, with the highest aluminium content in Asia. The reserves of quartz sand are 77.8 million tons.

=== Industry ===
Mianchi has aluminium and coal industries, as well as float glass factories and silicon refineries. Other industries are breweries, electronics, building materials, smelting, chemicals, medicine and food. The industry is turning from resources-oriented to processing, manufacturing and high-tech. Mianchi has become an important base of energy, metallurgy, building materials and sustainable materials. It is one of the most industrially developed counties in Henan province.

The industrial district of Mianchi county is an important industry area of Henan. Located on the west of Zhengzhou-Luoyang industry corridor, Mianchi has a favourable location.

== Tourism and culture ==
Mianchi has colorful and diverse scenery, such as the Yangshao Grand Canyon. Other tourist sights are the Danxia Scenic Area and Shifenggu Scenic Area. It is a popular regional holiday destination. In addition, Mianchi is home to many kinds of local products. The mild weather makes it feasible for many kinds of crops to grow well here. The total farmland area is 645 square kilometers. The main crops include wheat, corn, chilies, tobacco and peanuts, of which chili is about 23 square kilometers, tobacco production 40 square kilometers, and traditional Chinese medicine production 36 square kilometers. Mianchi is known in China for its three Yangshao treasures: Yangshao apricots, Yangshao dried persimmons, and Yangshao millet.

== Transportation ==
- G30 Lianyungang–Khorgas Expressway
- Mianchi South Railway Station
