= Chaiwopu Lake =

Lake in Xinjiang, China

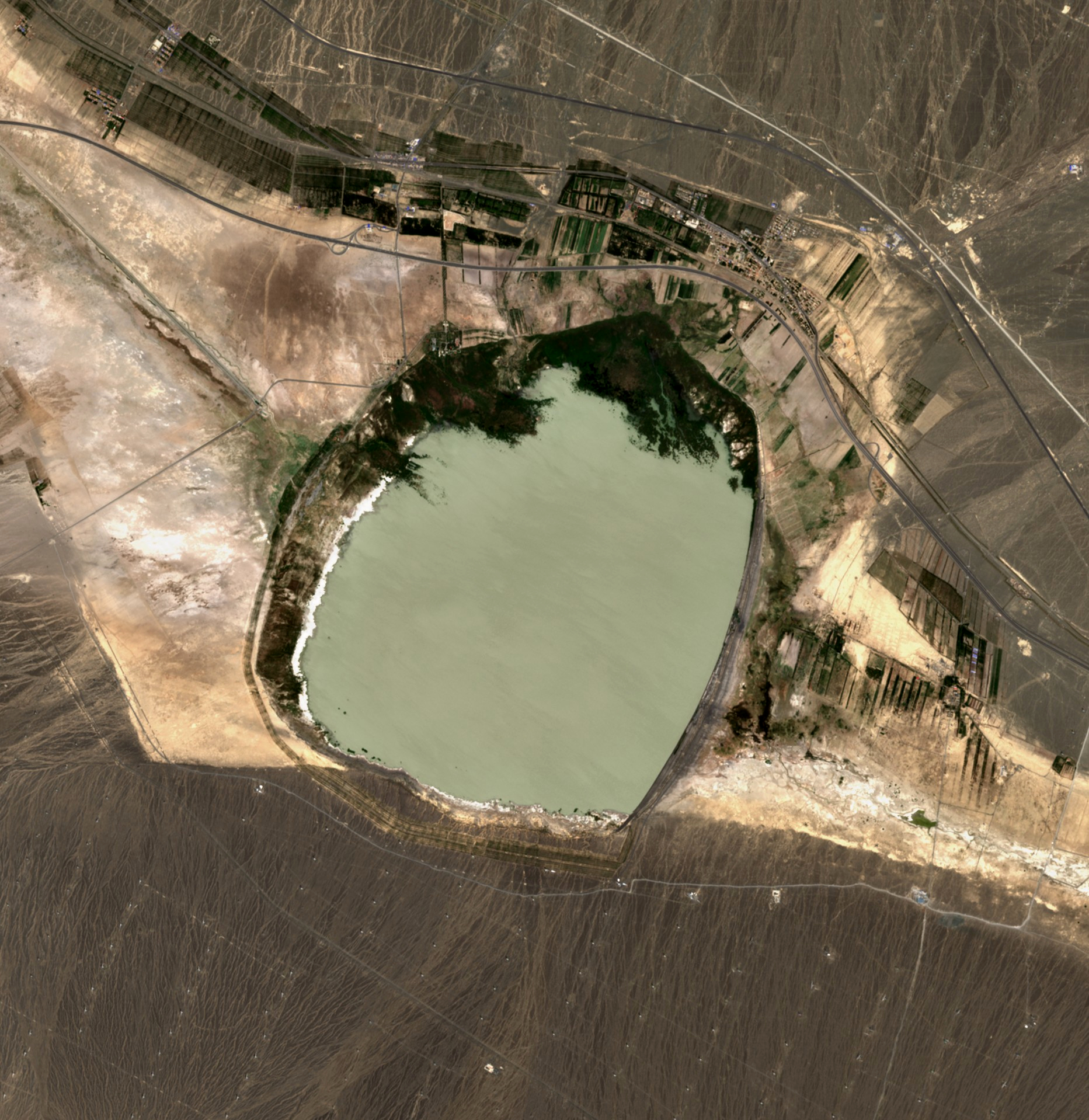
- Sentinel-2 image (2022)

- Location within Dzungaria
- Location: Chaiwopu Township, Dabancheng District, Ürümqi City, Xinjiang
- Coordinates: 43°30′N 87°55′E
- Basin countries: China
- Max. length: ca. 6 km (3.7 mi)
- Max. width: ca. 5 km (3.1 mi)
- Surface area: 28 km^{2} (11 sq mi)

Chaiwopu Lake (Chinese: 柴窝堡湖; pinyin: Chaiwopu Hu) is a freshwater lake located in Dabancheng District, some 45 km southeast of Ürümqi, in Xinjiang, China. The lake receives water from several streams from the Bogda Shan range.

The lake is almost round, some 5–6 km in diameter, which makes it the largest freshwater lake in the Ürümqi region. Chaiwopu Township, Chaiwopu Railway Station on the Lanxin Railway, and China National Highway 312 are located near the northern and northeastern shore of the lake.

Local media has referred to Chaiwopu Lake as "charming and beautiful". The lake and its surroundings are officially protected as Ürümqi Chaiwopuhu National Wetland Park (乌鲁木齐柴窝堡湖国家湿地公园).

The name of the lake (and of the eponymous township) is occasionally written as Chaiwobao. This is probably a misspelling: although the Chinese character 堡 has two readings, "bao" and "pu", it is the latter reading that, according to dictionaries, is normally used in place names.
