= Dabancheng, Ürümqi =

Dabancheng: 达坂城区 (Chinese); داۋانچىڭ رايونى (Uyghur); Dawanching
- District
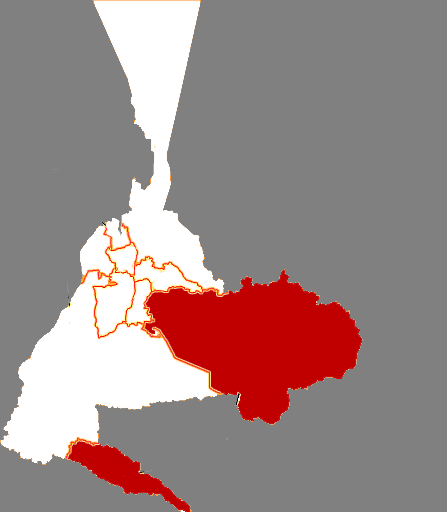
- Dabancheng in Ürümqi

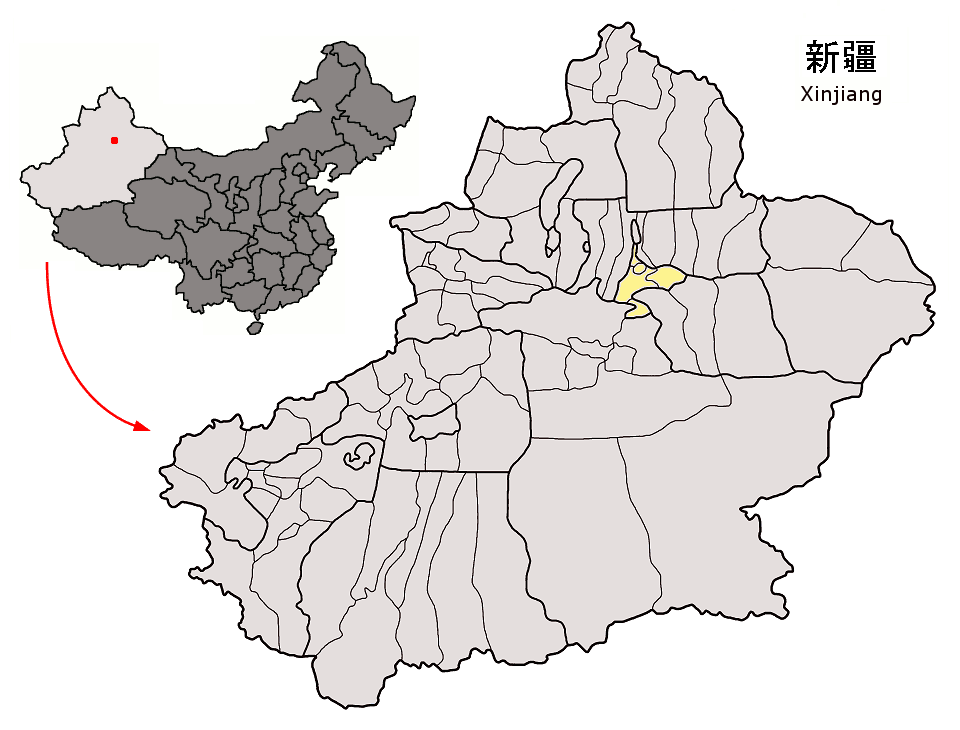
- Ürümqi in Xinjiang

- Location of the seat in Xinjiang Dabancheng (Xinjiang) Dabancheng (China)
- Coordinates: 43°48′N 87°35′E
- Country: China
- Province: Xinjiang
- Prefecture-level city: Ürümqi
- District seat: Dabancheng Town

Area
  - Total: 4,764 km^{2} (1,839 sq mi)

Population (2020)
  - Total: 35,540
  - Density: 7.460/km^{2} (19.32/sq mi)
- Time zone: UTC+8 (China Standard (Note: Locals in Xinjiang frequently observe UTC+6 (Xinjiang Time), 2 hours behind Beijing.))
- Website: www.dabancheng.gov.cn

Dabancheng, Ürümqi

Chinese name
- Simplified Chinese: 达坂城区
- Traditional Chinese: 達坂城區
Transcriptions
Standard Mandarin
- Hanyu Pinyin: Dábǎnchéng Qū

Uyghur name
- Uyghur: داۋانچىڭ رايونى
Transcriptions
- Latin Yëziqi: Dawanching Rayoni
- Siril Yëziqi: Даванчиң Райони

Dabancheng District (Chinese: 达坂城区; pinyin: Dábǎnchéng Qū) or Dawan Cheng (Uyghur: داۋانچىڭ رايونى, romanized: Dawanching Rayoni, Даванчиң Райони), is one of 7 urban districts of the prefecture-level city of Ürümqi, the capital of Xinjiang Uygur Autonomous Region, Northwest China. Located southeast of the Ürümqi urban area, it contains an area of 5,042 km^{2} (1,947 sq mi). According to the 2002 census, it has a population of 40,000.

The district seat of government is the town of the same name (Dabancheng Town). The name means 'Pass City'. Just south of the town is a low pass on the road from Ürümqi southeast to Turfan. It crosses a mountain spur that connects the main Tien Shan with the Bogda Shan to the northeast. As of July 2015 GoogleEarth appears to show road and rail tunnels and viaducts being built to avoid the pass.

Human habitation and irrigated agriculture in this arid area are made possible primarily by streams flowing south from the Bogda Shan range, which is located on the northern border of the district. The water that is not used up for irrigation locally flows into the district's several small lakes (Yanhu, Xiao Yanhu and Chaiwopu Lake) or down the Baichang River into the Toksun County.

“It showed me the utter barrenness of the slopes of gravel and decayed rock over which the ascent is made from the Turfān depression to the watershed; the remarkably low elevation of the latter, which on the plateau of Ta-fan-ch’êng [= Dawan Cheng] scarcely rises above 3,000 feet; and the ease of communication secured by this route between the Turfān basin and Dzungaria. At the Chinese village of Ta-fan-ch’êng close to the watershed irrigation is still required for the fields, and a lively stream coming from the high Bogdo-ula mountains to the north-east serves this purpose. But on the low hills over which Urumchi is approached cultivation depends on rain and snowfall only. This marked change in climatic conditions made its effects strikingly felt when we reached Ta-fan-ch’êng from the south-east; for there can be no doubt that the violent gales from the north-east for which the plateau is notorious, and one of which obliged us to make a day's halt there under rather trying conditions, are directly due to the ‘ aspiration ’ which draws the cold air of Dzungaria through this great gap of the T’ien-shan down into the deep depression of Turfān, where the atmosphere is warmed, even during the short winter, by far more abundant sunshine.”

Mountain ranges between Dabancheng and Ürümqi create a natural wind tunnel, increasing windspeed in the valley. Four of the five wind farms erected in Xinjiang in 2010 are in the area between National Highway 312 and the G30 Lianhuo Expressway, totaling more than 300 turbines.

== Administrative divisions ==
Dabancheng District contains 3 subdistricts, 1 town, and 3 townships:

Name	Simplified Chinese	Hanyu Pinyin	Uyghur (UEY)	Uyghur Latin (ULY)	Administrative division code
Subdistricts
Ewirghol Subdistrict	艾维尔沟街道	Àiwéi'ěr Jiēdào	ئېۋىرغول كوچا باشقارمىسى	Ëwirghol kocha bashqarmisi	650107001
Ulanbay Subdistrict	乌拉泊街道	Wūlāpō Jiēdào	ئۇلانباي كوچا باشقارمىسى	Ulanbay kocha bashqarmisi	650107004
Tuzköl Subdistrict (Yanhu Subdistrict)	盐湖街道	Yánhú Jiēdào	تۇزكۆل كوچا باشقارمىسى	Tuzköl kocha bashqarmisi	650107006
Town
Dabancheng Town	达坂城镇	Dábǎnchéng Zhèn	داۋانچىڭ بازىرى	Dawanching baziri	650107100
Townships
Donggou Township	东沟乡	Dōnggōu Xiāng	دوڭگۇ يېزىسى	Donggu yëzisi	650107200
Xigou Township	西沟乡	Xīgōu Xiāng	شىگۇ يېزىسى	Shigu yëzisi	650107201
Aksu Township	阿克苏乡	Ākèsū Xiāng	ئاقسۇ يېزىسى	Aqsu yëzisi	650107202

== Climate ==
Climate data for Dabancheng District, elevation 1,104 m (3,622 ft), (1991–2020 normals, extremes 1981–2010)
Month	Jan	Feb	Mar	Apr	May	Jun	Jul	Aug	Sep	Oct	Nov	Dec	Year
Record high °C (°F)	7.1 (44.8)	10.3 (50.5)	23.0 (73.4)	32.3 (90.1)	34.2 (93.6)	36.9 (98.4)	36.8 (98.2)	37.1 (98.8)	35.1 (95.2)	28.9 (84.0)	17.5 (63.5)	9.3 (48.7)	37.1 (98.8)
Mean daily maximum °C (°F)	−4.9 (23.2)	0.7 (33.3)	8.8 (47.8)	17.7 (63.9)	23.1 (73.6)	27.0 (80.6)	28.7 (83.7)	28.1 (82.6)	22.9 (73.2)	14.8 (58.6)	4.8 (40.6)	−3.2 (26.2)	14.0 (57.3)
Daily mean °C (°F)	−10.1 (13.8)	−6.2 (20.8)	0.9 (33.6)	9.8 (49.6)	15.5 (59.9)	20.1 (68.2)	21.6 (70.9)	20.2 (68.4)	14.6 (58.3)	7.0 (44.6)	−0.9 (30.4)	−7.8 (18.0)	7.1 (44.7)
Mean daily minimum °C (°F)	−14.5 (5.9)	−11.7 (10.9)	−5.3 (22.5)	2.8 (37.0)	8.2 (46.8)	13.0 (55.4)	14.8 (58.6)	13.1 (55.6)	7.4 (45.3)	0.6 (33.1)	−5.6 (21.9)	−11.8 (10.8)	0.9 (33.7)
Record low °C (°F)	−28.4 (−19.1)	−25.6 (−14.1)	−22.8 (−9.0)	−11.4 (11.5)	−7.8 (18.0)	2.7 (36.9)	5.4 (41.7)	3.9 (39.0)	−4.7 (23.5)	−13.5 (7.7)	−26.5 (−15.7)	−30.9 (−23.6)	−30.9 (−23.6)
Average precipitation mm (inches)	1.5 (0.06)	1.0 (0.04)	1.7 (0.07)	1.6 (0.06)	3.5 (0.14)	17.2 (0.68)	26.5 (1.04)	18.0 (0.71)	6.4 (0.25)	1.5 (0.06)	1.2 (0.05)	2.0 (0.08)	82.1 (3.24)
Average precipitation days (≥ 0.1 mm)	2.7	1.8	0.6	1.0	1.9	4.8	6.8	4.7	2.2	0.6	1.2	3.0	31.3
Average snowy days	7.9	4.8	2.4	0.8	0.2	0	0	0	0	0.6	3.3	8.0	28
Average relative humidity (%)	64	58	51	42	41	46	50	49	49	52	59	63	52
Mean monthly sunshine hours	191.5	205.0	255.8	286.6	325.7	313.3	304.9	298.7	278.5	253.0	193.6	168.0	3,074.6
Percentage possible sunshine	65	68	68	70	71	68	66	71	76	76	68	61	69
Source: China Meteorological Administration
