= Xin'an County =

Xin'an County 新安县 Sinan
- County
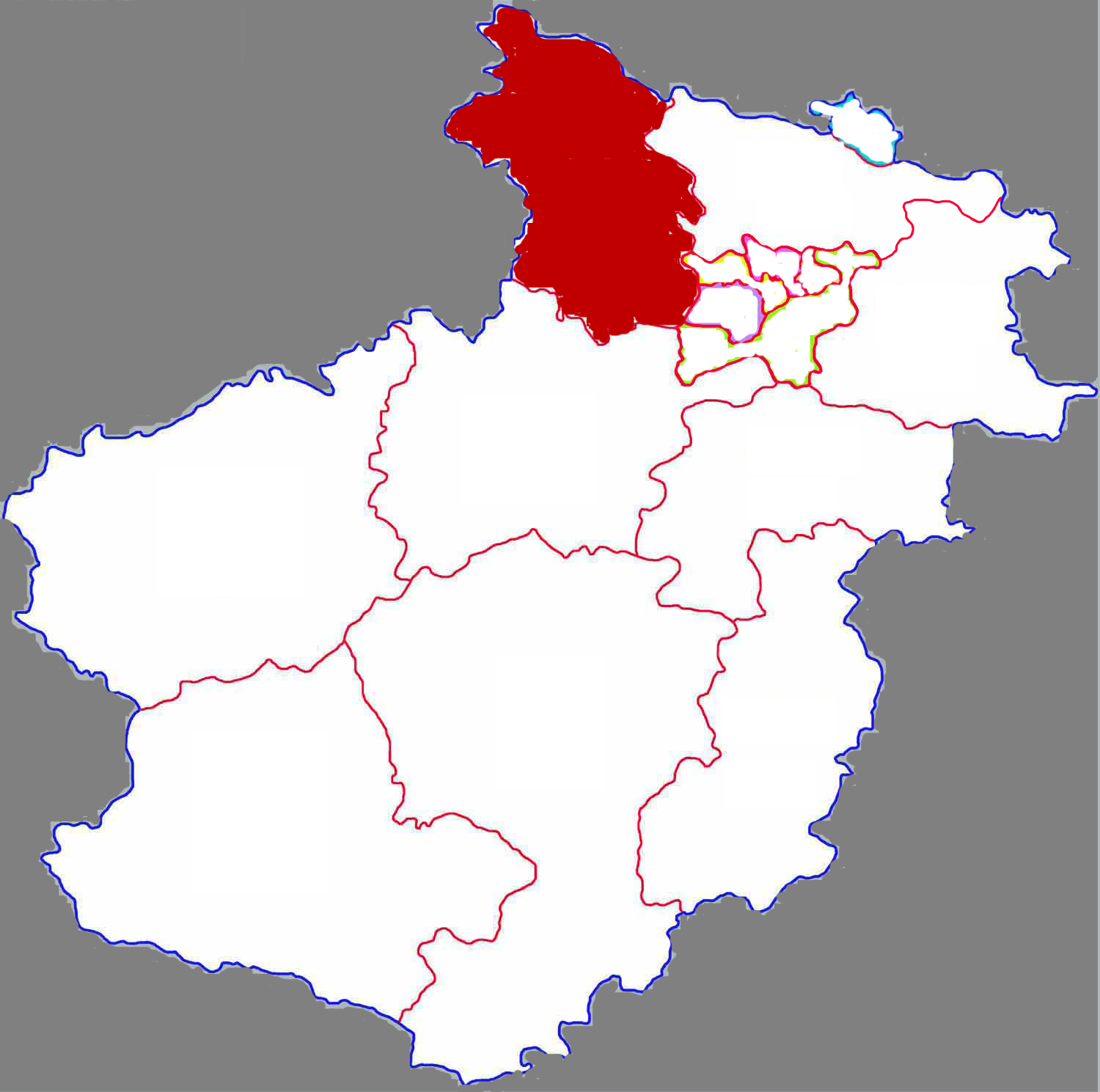
- Xin'an in Luoyang

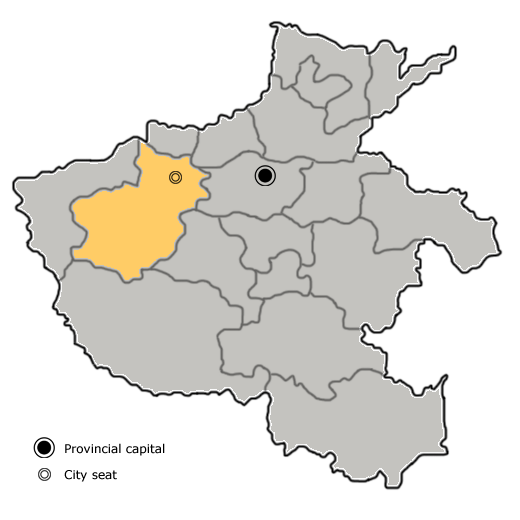
- Luoyang in Henan
- Coordinates: 34°43′41″N 112°07′55″E
- Country: People's Republic of China
- Province: Henan
- Prefecture-level city: Luoyang

Area
  - Total: 1,160 km^{2} (450 sq mi)

Population (2019)
  - Total: 490,200
  - Density: 423/km^{2} (1,090/sq mi)
- Time zone: UTC+8 (China Standard)
- Postal code: 471800

Xin'an County (Chinese: 新安县; pinyin: Xīn'ān Xiàn) is a county in the west of Henan Province, bordering Shanxi Province to the north across the Yellow River. It is under the administration of the prefecture-level city of Luoyang, and contains its northernmost point.

== History ==
In ancient China, Xin'an was a county located to the west of Luoyang, former capital of the Zhou dynasty (1049–256 BCE). The archaeological site of the Hanguguan gate dates back to this time and is thus enlisted by UNESCO as part of the world heritage site "Silk Roads".

For several centuries, Xinan fell into decline, despite its strategic importance for the northwestern non-Chinese principalities. For a short time (311-316 AD), the city became the capital of the Xi Jin dynasty, but after the conquest of the Huns, organized Chinese control over the region ceased. During the Sixteen Kingdoms period (303–439), several small states chose Xinan as their capital, and in the 6th century it became the capital of Xi Wei and Bei Zhou. The city was restored by the Sui Dynasty emperors (581–618), who made it their capital.

During the Tang Dynasty (618–907), Xinan was expanded and divided into three parts: The Palace City, the Imperial City for officials, and the Outer City for artisans and traders. The city quickly became one of the most luxurious in the world. After the fall of the Tang Dynasty, Xinan lost its importance, although it remained an important trade center. In the 13th century, Marco Polo described it as a thriving market. The name Xi'an (“Western World”), adopted in 1369 during the Ming Dynasty (1368–1644), was changed to Xijing in 1930 but returned in 1943.

Since the 1920s, Xinan has been an important point for the infiltration of communist ideology from the Soviet Union. In December 1936, the city became the site of the Xi'an Incident, which led to the united resistance of Chinese nationalists and communists against the Japanese.

== Administrative divisions ==
As of 2012, this county is divided to 10 towns and 1 township.

Towns

- Chengguan (城关镇)
- Shisi (石寺镇)
- Wutou (五头镇)
- Cijian (磁涧镇)
- Tiemen (铁门镇)
- Shijing (石井镇)
- Cangtou (仓头镇)
- Beiye (北冶镇)
- Zhengcun (正村镇)
- Nanlicun (南李村镇)

Townships

- Caocun Township (曹村乡)

== Climate ==
Climate data for Xin'an, elevation 364 m (1,194 ft), (1991–2020 normals, extremes 1981–2010)
Month	Jan	Feb	Mar	Apr	May	Jun	Jul	Aug	Sep	Oct	Nov	Dec	Year
Record high °C (°F)	19.7 (67.5)	27.2 (81.0)	29.0 (84.2)	37.2 (99.0)	40.6 (105.1)	41.7 (107.1)	40.8 (105.4)	38.4 (101.1)	40.4 (104.7)	33.5 (92.3)	28.2 (82.8)	21.9 (71.4)	41.7 (107.1)
Mean daily maximum °C (°F)	5.5 (41.9)	9.0 (48.2)	16.2 (61.2)	22.4 (72.3)	27.6 (81.7)	31.3 (88.3)	31.4 (88.5)	30.1 (86.2)	25.4 (77.7)	20.6 (69.1)	13.5 (56.3)	7.8 (46.0)	20.1 (68.1)
Daily mean °C (°F)	0.8 (33.4)	3.8 (38.8)	10.2 (50.4)	16.0 (60.8)	21.5 (70.7)	25.6 (78.1)	26.5 (79.7)	25.3 (77.5)	20.6 (69.1)	15.5 (59.9)	8.7 (47.7)	2.9 (37.2)	14.8 (58.6)
Mean daily minimum °C (°F)	−2.7 (27.1)	0.0 (32.0)	5.5 (41.9)	10.7 (51.3)	16.1 (61.0)	20.6 (69.1)	22.8 (73.0)	21.8 (71.2)	16.9 (62.4)	11.7 (53.1)	5.2 (41.4)	−0.6 (30.9)	10.7 (51.2)
Record low °C (°F)	−14.7 (5.5)	−13.4 (7.9)	−6.4 (20.5)	0.0 (32.0)	5.7 (42.3)	12.2 (54.0)	16.1 (61.0)	13.1 (55.6)	6.8 (44.2)	−1.4 (29.5)	−7.7 (18.1)	−9.6 (14.7)	−14.7 (5.5)
Average precipitation mm (inches)	14.1 (0.56)	16.3 (0.64)	18.1 (0.71)	38.3 (1.51)	61.3 (2.41)	76.6 (3.02)	122.8 (4.83)	103.1 (4.06)	102.4 (4.03)	47.1 (1.85)	34.2 (1.35)	5.5 (0.22)	639.8 (25.19)
Average precipitation days (≥ 0.1 mm)	4.8	5.2	5.8	6.7	7.8	7.5	10.0	10.4	10.4	7.8	6.3	2.7	85.4
Average snowy days	4.3	4.5	1.1	0.3	0	0	0	0	0	0	1.2	2.3	13.7
Average relative humidity (%)	52	56	50	55	55	59	75	77	74	67	61	50	61
Mean monthly sunshine hours	130.0	132.3	176.8	200.5	212.9	193.7	159.6	159.5	134.9	145.8	144.8	156.6	1,947.4
Percentage possible sunshine	41	42	47	51	49	45	37	39	37	42	47	52	44
Source: China Meteorological Administration

== Ethnicity and culture ==
Xinan is home to many ethnic groups, including Han Chinese, Tibetan, Yao, Zhuang and others. Each of these groups has its own unique customs, language and religion, which is reflected in the local culture, folk music, dance and architecture. Many ethnic minorities use tea in their religious and cultural rituals, considering it a symbol of purity and tranquility.

== Economy ==
Since the mid-1950s, Xinan has been one of the central government's main investment targets and has gradually become one of China's largest industrial cities. Initially, the main industries were the production of metallurgical products, chemicals, precision instruments, construction equipment, and food products. Further development has led to the creation of specialized industrial districts: the textile sector is located in the eastern suburbs, the production of electrical machinery in the western suburbs, the research and production base of the aerospace industry in the northeastern suburbs, and the electronics sector in the southwestern part. In addition, Xinan, as the center of an agricultural region, is actively engaged in the processing of agricultural products, including cotton, wheat, and tea.

== Tea industry ==
The provinces of the Xinan region grow a variety of tea varieties, including green, black, dark, red, yellow, jasmine (especially popular in Sichuan) and the famous Yunnan pu-erh. This region is an important center of China's tea industry, in particular due to its favorable climatic conditions and rich cultural heritage of tea cultivation.

Yunnan, in particular, is known as the birthplace of pu-erh, a fermented, aged and compressed tea that is considered the “king of teas”. Pu-erh has a complex, multi-layered flavor that develops over time through the fermentation process. This type of tea is valued for its unique properties, including not only its flavor but also its potential health benefits. Pu-erh is divided into two main categories: raw (shen) and aged (shu), each of which has its own specific characteristics and flavor notes.

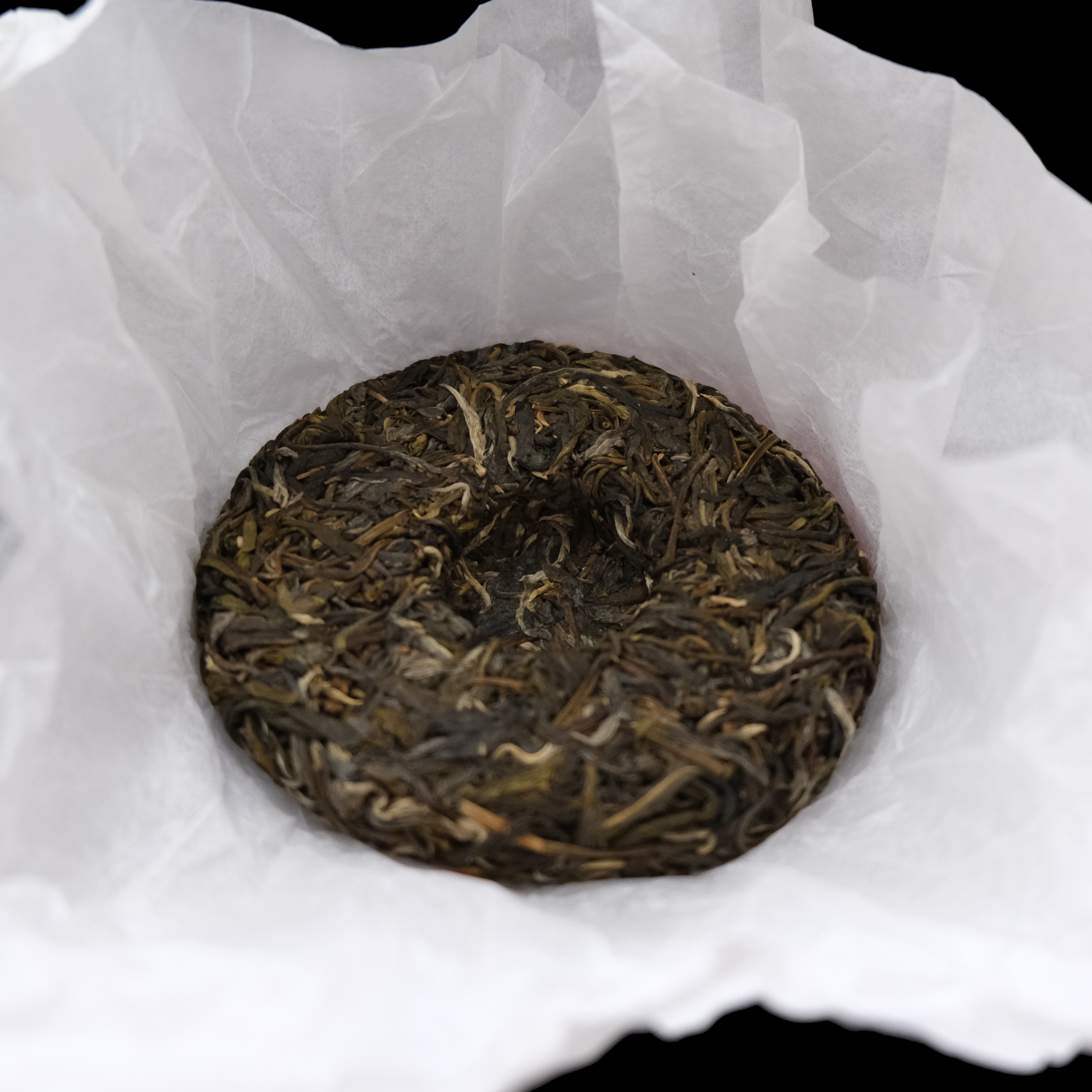

In addition to pu-erh, many other well-known varieties of tea are grown in Xinan, including:

- Yunnan Mao Feng (green tea, Yunnan Province) is one of the most famous varieties of green tea with a mild flavor and pleasant floral aroma.
- Du Yun Mao Jian (green tea, Guizhou Province) is a popular green tea with a bright, refreshing flavor.
- Gui Ding Yun Wu (green tea, Guizhou Province) - known for its delicate flavor and light smoky note.
- Meng Ding Cha or Mengding Sweet Dew (green tea, Sichuan) is a high-quality green tea with a mild and sweet flavor grown in the Mengding Mountains.
- Yunnan Gold (black tea, Yunnan province) is a high-quality black tea with a rich flavor and golden color of the infusion.
- Tiger Mountain Raw Pu-erh (raw pu-erh, Yunnan Province) is a classic raw pu-erh with mountain notes, which is characterized by a fresh and tart taste.
- Song Zhen Dian Hong or Pine Needle (black tea, Yunnan Province) is a black tea with a characteristic shape of tea leaves resembling pine needles and a deep, rich flavor.

These tea varieties are considered an integral part of Chinese tea culture and are exported around the world, enjoying great popularity among tea lovers for their high quality and rich flavor.
