= Krasny, Russia =

Krasny (Russian: Кра́сный; masculine), Krasnaya (Кра́сная; feminine), or Krasnoye (Кра́сное; neuter) is the name of several inhabited localities in Russia.

== Modern inhabited localities ==
=== Republic of Adygea ===
As of 2010, two rural localities in the Republic of Adygea bear this name:

- Krasny, Republic of Adygea, a khutor in Koshekhablsky District
- Krasnoye, Republic of Adygea, a selo in Teuchezhsky District

=== Amur Oblast ===
As of 2010, one rural locality in Amur Oblast bears this name:

- Krasnoye, Amur Oblast, a selo in Krasnensky Rural Settlement of Tambovsky District

=== Arkhangelsk Oblast ===
As of 2010, five rural localities in Arkhangelsk Oblast bear this name:

- Krasny, Arkhangelsk Oblast, a khutor in Shangalsky Selsoviet of Ustyansky District
- Krasnoye, Pinezhsky District, Arkhangelsk Oblast, a village in Pokshengsky Selsoviet of Pinezhsky District
- Krasnoye, Plesetsky District, Arkhangelsk Oblast, a village in Krasnovsky Selsoviet of Plesetsky District
- Krasnoye, Primorsky District, Arkhangelsk Oblast, a village in Lastolsky Selsoviet of Primorsky District
- Krasnaya, Arkhangelsk Oblast, a settlement in Gorkovsky Selsoviet of Verkhnetoyemsky District

=== Astrakhan Oblast ===
As of 2010, one rural locality in Astrakhan Oblast bears this name:

- Krasny, Astrakhan Oblast, a settlement in Tishkovsky Selsoviet of Volodarsky District

=== Belgorod Oblast ===
As of 2010, ten rural localities in Belgorod Oblast bear this name:

- Krasny, Korochansky District, Belgorod Oblast, a khutor in Korochansky District
- Krasny, Rakityansky District, Belgorod Oblast, a khutor in Zinaidinsky Rural Okrug of Rakityansky District
- Krasny, Shebekinsky District, Belgorod Oblast, a khutor in Shebekinsky District
- Krasnoye, Alexeyevsky District, Belgorod Oblast, a selo in Alexeyevsky District
- Krasnoye, Belgorodsky District, Belgorod Oblast, a selo in Belgorodsky District
- Krasnoye, Krasnensky District, Belgorod Oblast, a selo in Krasnensky Rural Okrug of Krasnensky District
- Krasnoye, Krasnogvardeysky District, Belgorod Oblast, a selo in Krasnogvardeysky District
- Krasnoye, Prokhorovsky District, Belgorod Oblast, a selo in Prokhorovsky District
- Krasnoye, Shebekinsky District, Belgorod Oblast, a settlement in Shebekinsky District
- Krasnoye, Yakovlevsky District, Belgorod Oblast, a selo in Yakovlevsky District

=== Bryansk Oblast ===
As of 2010, thirteen rural localities in Bryansk Oblast bear this name:

- Krasny, Klintsovsky District, Bryansk Oblast, a settlement in Velikotopalsky Selsoviet of Klintsovsky District
- Krasny, Mglinsky District, Bryansk Oblast, a settlement in Oskolkovsky Selsoviet of Mglinsky District
- Krasny, Pochepsky District, Bryansk Oblast, a settlement in Polnikovsky Selsoviet of Pochepsky District
- Krasny, Pogarsky District, Bryansk Oblast, a settlement in Chekhovsky Selsoviet of Pogarsky District
- Krasny, Starodubsky District, Bryansk Oblast, a settlement in Zankovsky Selsoviet of Starodubsky District
- Krasnoye, Brasovsky District, Bryansk Oblast, a settlement in Krasninsky Selsoviet of Brasovsky District
- Krasnoye, Klimovsky District, Bryansk Oblast, a settlement in Khoromensky Selsoviet of Klimovsky District
- Krasnoye, Krasnogorsky District, Bryansk Oblast, a settlement in Foshnyansky Selsoviet of Krasnogorsky District
- Krasnoye, Surazhsky District, Bryansk Oblast, a village in Novodrokovsky Selsoviet of Surazhsky District
- Krasnoye, Trubchevsky District, Bryansk Oblast, a village in Teletsky Selsoviet of Trubchevsky District
- Krasnoye, Vygonichsky District, Bryansk Oblast, a selo in Krasnoselsky Selsoviet of Vygonichsky District
- Krasnaya, Karachevsky District, Bryansk Oblast, a village in Velyaminovsky Selsoviet of Karachevsky District
- Krasnaya, Zhukovsky District, Bryansk Oblast, a settlement in Letoshnitsky Selsoviet of Zhukovsky District

=== Chelyabinsk Oblast ===
As of 2010, one rural locality in Chelyabinsk Oblast bears this name:

- Krasny, Chelyabinsk Oblast, a settlement under the administrative jurisdiction of the city of Miass

=== Republic of Dagestan ===
As of 2010, two rural localities in the Republic of Dagestan bear this name:

- Krasnoye, Khunzakhsky District, Republic of Dagestan, a selo in Kharikolinsky Selsoviet of Khunzakhsky District
- Krasnoye, Kizlyarsky District, Republic of Dagestan, a selo in Bolsheareshevsky Selsoviet of Kizlyarsky District

=== Ivanovo Oblast ===
As of 2010, four rural localities in Ivanovo Oblast bear this name:

- Krasnoye, Ivanovsky District, Ivanovo Oblast, a village in Ivanovsky District
- Krasnoye, Palekhsky District, Ivanovo Oblast, a selo in Palekhsky District
- Krasnoye, Rodnikovsky District, Ivanovo Oblast, a selo in Rodnikovsky District
- Krasnaya, Ivanovo Oblast, a village in Palekhsky District

=== Kaliningrad Oblast ===
As of 2010, four rural localities in Kaliningrad Oblast bear this name:

- Krasnoye, Guryevsky District, Kaliningrad Oblast, a settlement in Nizovsky Rural Okrug of Guryevsky District
- Krasnoye, Polessky District, Kaliningrad Oblast, a settlement in Golovkinsky Rural Okrug of Polessky District
- Krasnoye, Pravdinsky District, Kaliningrad Oblast, a settlement in Mozyrsky Rural Okrug of Pravdinsky District
- Krasnoye, Slavsky District, Kaliningrad Oblast, a settlement in Bolshakovsky Rural Okrug of Slavsky District

=== Kaluga Oblast ===
As of 2010, four rural localities in Kaluga Oblast bear this name:

- Krasnoye, Borovsky District, Kaluga Oblast, a village in Borovsky District
- Krasnoye, Khvastovichsky District, Kaluga Oblast, a selo in Khvastovichsky District
- Krasnoye, Sukhinichsky District, Kaluga Oblast, a selo in Sukhinichsky District
- Krasnoye, Zhizdrinsky District, Kaluga Oblast, a village in Zhizdrinsky District

=== Kamchatka Krai ===
As of 2010, one rural locality in Kamchatka Krai bears this name:

- Krasny, Kamchatka Krai, a settlement in Yelizovsky District

=== Kemerovo Oblast ===
As of 2010, one rural locality in Kemerovo Oblast bears this name:

- Krasnoye, Kemerovo Oblast, a selo in Krasninskaya Rural Territory of Leninsk-Kuznetsky District

=== Khabarovsk Krai ===
As of 2010, one rural locality in Khabarovsk Krai bears this name:

- Krasnoye, Khabarovsk Krai, a selo in Nikolayevsky District

=== Kirov Oblast ===
As of 2010, four rural localities in Kirov Oblast bear this name:

- Krasnoye, Darovskoy District, Kirov Oblast, a selo in Luzyansky Rural Okrug of Darovskoy District
- Krasnoye, Falyonsky District, Kirov Oblast, a selo in Verkhosunsky Rural Okrug of Falyonsky District
- Krasnoye, Kotelnichsky District, Kirov Oblast, a village in Chistopolsky Rural Okrug of Kotelnichsky District
- Krasnoye, Lebyazhsky District, Kirov Oblast, a selo in Krasnoyarsky Rural Okrug of Lebyazhsky District

=== Komi Republic ===
As of 2010, one rural locality in the Komi Republic bears this name:

- Krasnaya, Komi Republic, a village in Chasovo selo Administrative Territory of Syktyvdinsky District

=== Kostroma Oblast ===
As of 2010, one rural locality in Kostroma Oblast bears this name:

- Krasny, Kostroma Oblast, a khutor in Znamenskoye Settlement of Manturovsky District

=== Krasnodar Krai ===
As of 2010, eighteen rural localities in Krasnodar Krai bear this name:

- Krasny, Anapsky District, Krasnodar Krai, a khutor in Primorsky Rural Okrug of Anapsky District
- Krasny, Moldavansky Rural Okrug, Krymsky District, Krasnodar Krai, a khutor in Moldavansky Rural Okrug of Krymsky District
- Krasny, Yuzhny Rural Okrug, Krymsky District, Krasnodar Krai, a khutor in Yuzhny Rural Okrug of Krymsky District
- Krasny, Kurganinsky District, Krasnodar Krai, a settlement in Mikhaylovsky Rural Okrug of Kurganinsky District
- Krasny, Shkurinsky Rural Okrug, Kushchyovsky District, Krasnodar Krai, a khutor in Shkurinsky Rural Okrug of Kushchyovsky District
- Krasny, Srednechuburksky Rural Okrug, Kushchyovsky District, Krasnodar Krai, a khutor in Srednechuburksky Rural Okrug of Kushchyovsky District
- Krasny, Labinsky District, Krasnodar Krai, a settlement in Voznesensky Rural Okrug of Labinsky District
- Krasny, Pavlovsky District, Krasnodar Krai, a khutor in Severny Rural Okrug of Pavlovsky District
- Krasny, Primorsko-Akhtarsky District, Krasnodar Krai, a khutor in Stepnoy Rural Okrug of Primorsko-Akhtarsky District
- Krasny, Seversky District, Krasnodar Krai, a khutor in Lvovsky Rural Okrug of Seversky District
- Krasny, Tikhoretsky District, Krasnodar Krai, a khutor in Khopersky Rural Okrug of Tikhoretsky District
- Krasny, Poselkovy Rural Okrug, Timashyovsky District, Krasnodar Krai, a settlement in Poselkovy Rural Okrug of Timashyovsky District
- Krasny, Rogovsky Rural Okrug, Timashyovsky District, Krasnodar Krai, a khutor in Rogovsky Rural Okrug of Timashyovsky District
- Krasny, Ust-Labinsky District, Krasnodar Krai, a khutor in Alexandrovsky Rural Okrug of Ust-Labinsky District
- Krasny, Vyselkovsky District, Krasnodar Krai, a settlement in Gazyrsky Rural Okrug of Vyselkovsky District
- Krasnoye (khutor), Krasnoselsky Rural Okrug, Kushchyovsky District, Krasnodar Krai, a khutor in Krasnoselsky Rural Okrug of Kushchyovsky District
- Krasnoye (selo), Krasnoselsky Rural Okrug, Kushchyovsky District, Krasnodar Krai, a selo in Krasnoselsky Rural Okrug of Kushchyovsky District
- Krasnoye, Tuapsinsky District, Krasnodar Krai, a selo in Velyaminovsky Rural Okrug of Tuapsinsky District

=== Krasnoyarsk Krai ===
As of 2010, one rural locality in Krasnoyarsk Krai bears this name:

- Krasnaya, Krasnoyarsk Krai, a village in Krasnensky Selsoviet of Balakhtinsky District

=== Kursk Oblast ===
As of 2010, four rural localities in Kursk Oblast bear this name:

- Krasny, Oboyansky District, Kursk Oblast, a settlement in Pavlovsky Selsoviet of Oboyansky District
- Krasny, Zheleznogorsky District, Kursk Oblast, a settlement in Rastorogsky Selsoviet of Zheleznogorsky District
- Krasnoye, Medvensky District, Kursk Oblast, a khutor in Kitayevsky Selsoviet of Medvensky District
- Krasnoye, Solntsevsky District, Kursk Oblast, a khutor in Chermoshnyansky Selsoviet of Solntsevsky District

=== Leningrad Oblast ===
As of 2010, one rural locality in Leningrad Oblast bears this name:

- Krasnoye, Leningrad Oblast, a logging depot settlement in Plodovskoye Settlement Municipal Formation of Priozersky District

=== Lipetsk Oblast ===
As of 2010, seven rural localities in Lipetsk Oblast bear this name:

- Krasny, Lipetsk Oblast, a settlement in Znamensky Selsoviet of Lev-Tolstovsky District
- Krasnoye, Dankovsky District, Lipetsk Oblast, a village in Voskresensky Selsoviet of Dankovsky District
- Krasnoye, Dolgorukovsky District, Lipetsk Oblast, a selo in Dolgorukovsky Selsoviet of Dolgorukovsky District
- Krasnoye, Krasninsky District, Lipetsk Oblast, a selo in Krasninsky Selsoviet of Krasninsky District
- Krasnoye, Lipetsky District, Lipetsk Oblast, a village in Pruzhinsky Selsoviet of Lipetsky District
- Krasnoye, Usmansky District, Lipetsk Oblast, a selo in Storozhevskoy Selsoviet of Usmansky District
- Krasnaya, Lipetsk Oblast, a village in Dubovetsky Selsoviet of Dolgorukovsky District

=== Republic of Mordovia ===
As of 2010, two rural localities in the Republic of Mordovia bear this name:

- Krasny, Staroshaygovsky District, Republic of Mordovia, a settlement in Staroshaygovsky Selsoviet of Staroshaygovsky District
- Krasny, Temnikovsky District, Republic of Mordovia, a settlement in Zhegalovsky Selsoviet of Temnikovsky District

=== Moscow Oblast ===
As of 2010, seven rural localities in Moscow Oblast bear this name:

- Krasny, Moscow Oblast, a settlement in Bukarevskoye Rural Settlement of Istrinsky District
- Krasnoye, Domodedovo, Moscow Oblast, a village under the administrative jurisdiction of the Domodedovo City Under Oblast Jurisdiction
- Krasnoye (selo), Dorokhovskoye Rural Settlement, Orekhovo-Zuyevsky District, Moscow Oblast, a selo in Dorokhovskoye Rural Settlement of Orekhovo-Zuyevsky District
- Krasnoye (village), Dorokhovskoye Rural Settlement, Orekhovo-Zuyevsky District, Moscow Oblast, a village in Dorokhovskoye Rural Settlement of Orekhovo-Zuyevsky District
- Krasnoye (selo), Krasnopakhorskoye Rural Settlement, Podolsky District, Moscow Oblast, a selo in Krasnopakhorskoye Rural Settlement of Podolsky District
- Krasnoye (settlement), Krasnopakhorskoye Rural Settlement, Podolsky District, Moscow Oblast, a settlement in Krasnopakhorskoye Rural Settlement of Podolsky District
- Krasnoye, Serebryano-Prudsky District, Moscow Oblast, a selo under the administrative jurisdiction of the work settlement of Serebryanye Prudy, Serebryano-Prudsky District

=== Nenets Autonomous Okrug ===
As of 2010, one rural locality in Nenets Autonomous Okrug bears this name:

- Krasnoye, Nenets Autonomous Okrug, a settlement in Primorsko-Kuysky Selsoviet of Zapolyarny District

=== Nizhny Novgorod Oblast ===
As of 2010, five rural localities in Nizhny Novgorod Oblast bear this name:

- Krasny, Nizhny Novgorod Oblast, a settlement in Sovetsky Selsoviet of Bolshemurashkinsky District
- Krasnoye, Arzamassky District, Nizhny Novgorod Oblast, a selo in Krasnoselsky Selsoviet of Arzamassky District
- Krasnoye, Sechenovsky District, Nizhny Novgorod Oblast, a selo in Sechenovsky Selsoviet of Sechenovsky District
- Krasnoye, Sosnovsky District, Nizhny Novgorod Oblast, a village in Yakovsky Selsoviet of Sosnovsky District
- Krasnoye, Voskresensky District, Nizhny Novgorod Oblast, a village in Blagoveshchensky Selsoviet of Voskresensky District

=== Novgorod Oblast ===
As of 2010, three rural localities in Novgorod Oblast bear this name:

- Krasnoye, Malovishersky District, Novgorod Oblast, a village in Burginskoye Settlement of Malovishersky District
- Krasnoye, Maryovsky District, Novgorod Oblast, a village in Velilskoye Settlement of Maryovsky District
- Krasnaya, Novgorod Oblast, a village in Zhirkovskoye Settlement of Demyansky District

=== Novosibirsk Oblast ===
As of 2010, one rural locality in Novosibirsk Oblast bears this name:

- Krasnoye, Novosibirsk Oblast, a selo in Chanovsky District

=== Orenburg Oblast ===
As of 2010, one rural locality in Orenburg Oblast bears this name:

- Krasnoye, Orenburg Oblast, a selo in Krasnovsky Selsoviet of Pervomaysky District

=== Oryol Oblast ===
As of 2010, ten rural localities in Oryol Oblast bear this name:

- Krasny, Kudinovsky Selsoviet, Dolzhansky District, Oryol Oblast, a settlement in Kudinovsky Selsoviet of Dolzhansky District
- Krasny, Urynovsky Selsoviet, Dolzhansky District, Oryol Oblast, a settlement in Urynovsky Selsoviet of Dolzhansky District
- Krasny, Kolpnyansky District, Oryol Oblast, a settlement in Krutovsky Selsoviet of Kolpnyansky District
- Krasny, Livensky District, Oryol Oblast, a settlement in Nikolsky Selsoviet of Livensky District
- Krasny, Mtsensky District, Oryol Oblast, a settlement in Anikanovsky Selsoviet of Mtsensky District
- Krasny, Droskovsky Selsoviet, Pokrovsky District, Oryol Oblast, a settlement in Droskovsky Selsoviet of Pokrovsky District
- Krasny, Retinsky Selsoviet, Pokrovsky District, Oryol Oblast, a settlement in Retinsky Selsoviet of Pokrovsky District
- Krasnoye, Kolpnyansky District, Oryol Oblast, a selo in Krasnyansky Selsoviet of Kolpnyansky District
- Krasnoye, Verkhovsky District, Oryol Oblast, a selo in Telyazhensky Selsoviet of Verkhovsky District
- Krasnoye, Zalegoshchensky District, Oryol Oblast, a selo in Krasnensky Selsoviet of Zalegoshchensky District

=== Penza Oblast ===
As of 2010, four rural localities in Penza Oblast bear this name:

- Krasny, Bashmakovsky District, Penza Oblast, a settlement in Sosnovsky Selsoviet of Bashmakovsky District
- Krasny, Gorodishchensky District, Penza Oblast, a settlement in Kanayevsky Selsoviet of Gorodishchensky District
- Krasny, Nizhnelomovsky District, Penza Oblast, a settlement in Atmissky Selsoviet of Nizhnelomovsky District
- Krasnoye, Penza Oblast, a selo in Usovsky Selsoviet of Nikolsky District

=== Perm Krai ===
As of 2010, one rural locality in Perm Krai bears this name:

- Krasnoye, Perm Krai, a settlement under the administrative jurisdiction of the city of krai significance of Dobryanka

=== Pskov Oblast ===
As of 2010, one rural locality in Pskov Oblast bears this name:

- Krasnoye, Pskov Oblast, a village in Pustoshkinsky District

=== Rostov Oblast ===
As of 2010, four rural localities in Rostov Oblast bear this name:

- Krasny, Aksaysky District, Rostov Oblast, a settlement in Shchepkinskoye Rural Settlement of Aksaysky District
- Krasny, Bagayevsky District, Rostov Oblast, a khutor in Krasnenskoye Rural Settlement of Bagayevsky District
- Krasny, Neklinovsky District, Rostov Oblast, a khutor in Andreyevo-Melentyevskoye Rural Settlement of Neklinovsky District
- Krasny, Oktyabrsky District, Rostov Oblast, a khutor in Krasyukovskoye Rural Settlement of Oktyabrsky District

=== Ryazan Oblast ===
As of 2010, twelve rural localities in Ryazan Oblast bear this name:

- Krasny, Chuchkovsky District, Ryazan Oblast, a settlement in Protasyevo-Uglyansky Rural Okrug of Chuchkovsky District
- Krasny, Miloslavsky District, Ryazan Oblast, a settlement in Bolshepodovechinsky Rural Okrug of Miloslavsky District
- Krasny, Sasovsky District, Ryazan Oblast, a settlement in Pridorozhny Rural Okrug of Sasovsky District
- Krasny, Shatsky District, Ryazan Oblast, a settlement in Kazachinsky Rural Okrug of Shatsky District
- Krasny, Shilovsky District, Ryazan Oblast, a settlement in Berezovsky Rural Okrug of Shilovsky District
- Krasny, Skopinsky District, Ryazan Oblast, a settlement in Lopatinsky Rural Okrug of Skopinsky District
- Krasny, Ukholovsky District, Ryazan Oblast, a settlement in Kalininsky Rural Okrug of Ukholovsky District
- Krasnoye, Krasnovsky Rural Okrug, Mikhaylovsky District, Ryazan Oblast, a selo in Krasnovsky Rural Okrug of Mikhaylovsky District
- Krasnoye, Zhmurovsky Rural Okrug, Mikhaylovsky District, Ryazan Oblast, a village in Zhmurovsky Rural Okrug of Mikhaylovsky District
- Krasnoye, Alexandro-Nevsky District, Ryazan Oblast, a selo in Burminsky Rural Okrug of Alexandro-Nevsky District
- Krasnoye, Pronsky District, Ryazan Oblast, a selo in Alyutovsky Rural Okrug of Pronsky District
- Krasnoye, Sapozhkovsky District, Ryazan Oblast, a selo in Nikolsky Rural Okrug of Sapozhkovsky District

=== Saratov Oblast ===
As of 2010, two rural localities in Saratov Oblast bear this name:

- Krasny, Arkadaksky District, Saratov Oblast, a settlement in Arkadaksky District
- Krasny, Samoylovsky District, Saratov Oblast, a settlement in Samoylovsky District

=== Smolensk Oblast ===
As of 2010, five inhabited localities in Smolensk Oblast bear this name:

Urban localities

- Krasny, Krasninsky District, Smolensk Oblast, a settlement under the administrative jurisdiction of Krasninskoye Urban Settlement of Krasninsky District

Rural localities

- Krasny, Roslavlsky District, Smolensk Oblast, a settlement in Lyubovskoye Rural Settlement of Roslavlsky District
- Krasnoye, Khislavichsky District, Smolensk Oblast, a village in Vladimirovskoye Rural Settlement of Khislavichsky District
- Krasnoye, Krasninsky District, Smolensk Oblast, a station in Krasnovskoye Rural Settlement of Krasninsky District
- Krasnoye, Ugransky District, Smolensk Oblast, a village in Znamenskoye Rural Settlement of Ugransky District

=== Stavropol Krai ===
As of 2010, one rural locality in Stavropol Krai bears this name:

- Krasnoye, Stavropol Krai, a selo in Krasny Selsoviet of Grachyovsky District

=== Sverdlovsk Oblast ===
As of 2010, one rural locality in Sverdlovsk Oblast bears this name:

- Krasny, Sverdlovsk Oblast, a settlement under the administrative jurisdiction of the city of Verkhnyaya Pyshma

=== Tambov Oblast ===
As of 2010, six rural localities in Tambov Oblast bear this name:

- Krasny, Kirsanovsky District, Tambov Oblast, a settlement in Leninsky Selsoviet of Kirsanovsky District
- Krasny, Morshansky District, Tambov Oblast, a settlement in Novotomnikovsky Selsoviet of Morshansky District
- Krasny, Petrovsky District, Tambov Oblast, a settlement in Pervomaysky Selsoviet of Petrovsky District
- Krasny, Rzhaksinsky District, Tambov Oblast, a settlement in Kamensky Selsoviet of Rzhaksinsky District
- Krasny, Tokaryovsky District, Tambov Oblast, a settlement in Lvovsky Selsoviet of Tokaryovsky District
- Krasny, Uvarovsky District, Tambov Oblast, a settlement in Berezovsky Selsoviet of Uvarovsky District

=== Tula Oblast ===
As of 2010, sixteen rural localities in Tula Oblast bear this name:

- Krasny, Arsenyevsky District, Tula Oblast, a settlement in Golubochensky Rural Okrug of Arsenyevsky District
- Krasny, Bogoroditsky District, Tula Oblast, a settlement in Bakhmetyevsky Rural Okrug of Bogoroditsky District
- Krasny, Kamensky District, Tula Oblast, a settlement in Soklakovsky Rural Okrug of Kamensky District
- Krasny, Kurkinsky District, Tula Oblast, a settlement in Samarskaya Volost of Kurkinsky District
- Krasny, Plavsky District, Tula Oblast, a settlement in Prigorodny Rural Okrug of Plavsky District
- Krasny, Shchyokinsky District, Tula Oblast, a settlement in Kostomarovskaya Rural Administration of Shchyokinsky District
- Krasny, Venyovsky District, Tula Oblast, a settlement in Dyakonovsky Rural Okrug of Venyovsky District
- Krasnoye, Aleksinsky District, Tula Oblast, a village in Michurinsky Rural Okrug of Aleksinsky District
- Krasnoye, Arsenyevsky District, Tula Oblast, a selo in Yasenkovsky Rural Okrug of Arsenyevsky District
- Krasnoye, Chernsky District, Tula Oblast, a village in Molchanovskaya Rural Administration of Chernsky District
- Krasnoye, Kimovsky District, Tula Oblast, a village in Buchalsky Rural Okrug of Kimovsky District
- Krasnoye, Odoyevsky District, Tula Oblast, a selo in Apukhtinskaya Rural Administration of Odoyevsky District
- Krasnoye, Meshcherinsky Rural Okrug, Plavsky District, Tula Oblast, a village in Meshcherinsky Rural Okrug of Plavsky District
- Krasnoye, Oktyabrsky Rural Okrug, Plavsky District, Tula Oblast, a selo in Oktyabrsky Rural Okrug of Plavsky District
- Krasnoye, Tyoplo-Ogaryovsky District, Tula Oblast, a village in Pokrovsky Rural Okrug of Tyoplo-Ogaryovsky District
- Krasnaya, Tula Oblast, a village in Novoselsky Rural Okrug of Kireyevsky District

=== Tver Oblast ===
As of 2010, nine rural localities in Tver Oblast bear this name:

- Krasnoye, Kalyazinsky District, Tver Oblast, a village in Kalyazinsky District
- Krasnoye, Kimrsky District, Tver Oblast, a selo in Kimrsky District
- Krasnoye, Rameshkovsky District, Tver Oblast, a village in Rameshkovsky District
- Krasnoye, Rzhevsky District, Tver Oblast, a village in Rzhevsky District
- Krasnoye, Staritsky District, Tver Oblast, a village in Staritsky District
- Krasnoye, Torzhoksky District, Tver Oblast, a selo in Torzhoksky District
- Krasnoye, Udomelsky District, Tver Oblast, a village in Udomelsky District
- Krasnoye, Vesyegonsky District, Tver Oblast, a village in Vesyegonsky District
- Krasnoye, Vyshnevolotsky District, Tver Oblast, a village in Vyshnevolotsky District

=== Tyumen Oblast ===
As of 2010, one rural locality in Tyumen Oblast bears this name:

- Krasnaya, Tyumen Oblast, a village in Zavodoukovsky District

=== Udmurt Republic ===
As of 2010, two rural localities in the Udmurt Republic bear this name:

- Krasny, Udmurt Republic, a khutor in Bolsheoshvortsinsky Selsoviet of Yakshur-Bodyinsky District
- Krasnoye, Udmurt Republic, a selo in Krasny Selsoviet of Uvinsky District

=== Ulyanovsk Oblast ===
As of 2010, one rural locality in Ulyanovsk Oblast bears this name:

- Krasny, Ulyanovsk Oblast, a settlement in Krasnoselsky Rural Okrug of Novospassky District

=== Vladimir Oblast ===
As of 2010, two rural localities in Vladimir Oblast bear this name:

- Krasnoye, Suzdalsky District, Vladimir Oblast, a selo in Suzdalsky District
- Krasnoye, Yuryev-Polsky District, Vladimir Oblast, a selo in Yuryev-Polsky District

=== Volgograd Oblast ===
As of 2010, five rural localities in Volgograd Oblast bear this name:

- Krasny, Chernyshkovsky District, Volgograd Oblast, a settlement in Krasnoyarsky Selsoviet of Chernyshkovsky District
- Krasny, Danilovsky District, Volgograd Oblast, a khutor in Krasninsky Selsoviet of Danilovsky District
- Krasny, Sredneakhtubinsky District, Volgograd Oblast, a settlement in Kuybyshevsky Selsoviet of Sredneakhtubinsky District
- Krasny, Uryupinsky District, Volgograd Oblast, a khutor in Krasnyansky Selsoviet of Uryupinsky District
- Krasny, Yelansky District, Volgograd Oblast, a settlement under the administrative jurisdiction of the urban-type settlement of Yelan, Yelansky District

=== Vologda Oblast ===
As of 2010, seven rural localities in Vologda Oblast bear this name:

- Krasnoye, Gryazovetsky District, Vologda Oblast, a village in Lezhsky Selsoviet of Gryazovetsky District
- Krasnoye, Andronovsky Selsoviet, Kaduysky District, Vologda Oblast, a village in Andronovsky Selsoviet of Kaduysky District
- Krasnoye, Velikoselsky Selsoviet, Kaduysky District, Vologda Oblast, a village in Velikoselsky Selsoviet of Kaduysky District
- Krasnoye, Sheksninsky District, Vologda Oblast, a village in Zheleznodorozhny Selsoviet of Sheksninsky District
- Krasnoye, Tarnogsky District, Vologda Oblast, a selo in Zaborsky Selsoviet of Tarnogsky District
- Krasnoye, Totemsky District, Vologda Oblast, a selo in Manylovsky Selsoviet of Totemsky District
- Krasnoye, Vologodsky District, Vologda Oblast, a village in Sosnovsky Selsoviet of Vologodsky District

=== Voronezh Oblast ===
As of 2010, eleven rural localities in Voronezh Oblast bear this name:

- Krasny, Anninsky District, Voronezh Oblast, a settlement in Krasnologskoye Rural Settlement of Anninsky District
- Krasny, Oktyabrskoye Rural Settlement, Bobrovsky District, Voronezh Oblast, a settlement in Oktyabrskoye Rural Settlement of Bobrovsky District
- Krasny, Yudanovskoye Rural Settlement, Bobrovsky District, Voronezh Oblast, a settlement in Yudanovskoye Rural Settlement of Bobrovsky District
- Krasny, Berezovskoye Rural Settlement, Buturlinovsky District, Voronezh Oblast, a settlement in Berezovskoye Rural Settlement of Buturlinovsky District
- Krasny, Puzevskoye Rural Settlement, Buturlinovsky District, Voronezh Oblast, a settlement in Puzevskoye Rural Settlement of Buturlinovsky District
- Krasny, Podgorensky District, Voronezh Oblast, a khutor in Vitebskoye Rural Settlement of Podgorensky District
- Krasny, Semiluksky District, Voronezh Oblast, a khutor in Medvezhenskoye Rural Settlement of Semiluksky District
- Krasny, Talovsky District, Voronezh Oblast, a settlement in Kazanskoye Rural Settlement of Talovsky District
- Krasnoye, Novokhopyorsky District, Voronezh Oblast, a selo in Krasnyanskoye Rural Settlement of Novokhopyorsky District
- Krasnoye, Paninsky District, Voronezh Oblast, a selo in Krasnenskoye Rural Settlement of Paninsky District
- Krasnoye, Ramonsky District, Voronezh Oblast, a khutor in Aydarovskoye Rural Settlement of Ramonsky District

=== Yaroslavl Oblast ===
As of 2010, ten rural localities in Yaroslavl Oblast bear this name:

- Krasnoye, Nekouzsky District, Yaroslavl Oblast, a selo in Stanilovsky Rural Okrug of Nekouzsky District
- Krasnoye, Pereslavsky District, Yaroslavl Oblast, a selo in Dobrilovsky Rural Okrug of Pereslavsky District
- Krasnoye, Krasnovsky Rural Okrug, Poshekhonsky District, Yaroslavl Oblast, a selo in Krasnovsky Rural Okrug of Poshekhonsky District
- Krasnoye, Vasilyevsky Rural Okrug, Poshekhonsky District, Yaroslavl Oblast, a selo in Vasilyevsky Rural Okrug of Poshekhonsky District
- Krasnoye, Rybinsky District, Yaroslavl Oblast, a selo in Oktyabrsky Rural Okrug of Rybinsky District
- Krasnoye (railway station), Maymersky Rural Okrug, Uglichsky District, Yaroslavl Oblast, a railway station in Maymersky Rural Okrug of Uglichsky District
- Krasnoye (selo), Maymersky Rural Okrug, Uglichsky District, Yaroslavl Oblast, a selo in Maymersky Rural Okrug of Uglichsky District
- Krasnoye, Otradnovsky Rural Okrug, Uglichsky District, Yaroslavl Oblast, a selo in Otradnovsky Rural Okrug of Uglichsky District
- Krasnoye, Ryutnevsky Rural Okrug, Yaroslavsky District, Yaroslavl Oblast, a settlement in Ryutnevsky Rural Okrug of Yaroslavsky District
- Krasnoye, Tunoshensky Rural Okrug, Yaroslavsky District, Yaroslavl Oblast, a selo in Tunoshensky Rural Okrug of Yaroslavsky District

== Historical inhabited localities ==
- Krasny, former urban-type settlement in Rostov Oblast; since 2004—a part of the town of Novoshakhtinsk
