= Kudrino =

Kudrino (Russian: Кудрино) is the name of several rural localities in Russia:

- Kudrino, Arkhangelsk Oblast, a village in Cheryomushskoye Rural Settlement of Kotlassky District, Arkhangelsk Oblast
- Kudrino, Astrakhan Oblast, a selo in Marfinsky Selsoviet of Volodarsky District, Astrakhan Oblast
- Kudrino, Nikolsky District, Vologda Oblast, a village in Baydarovskoye Rural Settlement, Nikolsky District, Vologda Oblast
- Kudrino, Verkhovazhsky District, Vologda Oblast, a village in Chushevitskoye Rural Settlement of Vologodsky District, Vologda Oblast
- Kudrino, Vologodsky District, Vologda Oblast, a village in Spasskoye Rural Settlement of Vologodsky District, Vologda Oblast
- Kudrino, Alexandrovsky District, Vladimir Oblast, a village in Andreyevskoye Rural Settlement of Alexandrovsky District, Vladimir Oblast
- Kudrino, Kirzhachsky District, Vladimir Oblast, a village in Kiprevskoye Rural Settlement of Kirzhachsky District, Vladimir Oblast
- Kudrino, Melenkovsky District, Vladimir Oblast, a selo in Ilkinskoye Rural Settlement of Melenkovsky District, Vladimir Oblast
