= Krasnoye =

Krasnoye may refer to:

- Krasnoye, Krasnensky District, Belgorod Oblast, rural locality and the administrative center of Krasnensky District of Belgorod Oblast, Russia
- Krasnoye, Krasninsky District, Smolensk Oblast, rural locality in the Krasninsky District of Smolensk Oblast, Russia
- Krasnoye, Trubchevsky District, Bryansk Oblast, rural locality in Trubchevsky District, Bryansk Oblast, Russia
- Krasnoye-na-Volge, urban locality in Krasnoselsky District of Kostroma Oblast, Russia
- Krasnoye (crater), a crater on Mars
- Krasnoye Sormovo Factory No. 112, one of the oldest shipbuilding factories in Russia, located in the Sormovsky City District of Nizhny Novgorod

== See also ==
- Krasny (disambiguation)
- Krasnoye Selo (inhabited locality)
- Lake Krasnoye (disambiguation)
