= Asian Highway Network =

International road network connecting Asia and parts of Europe

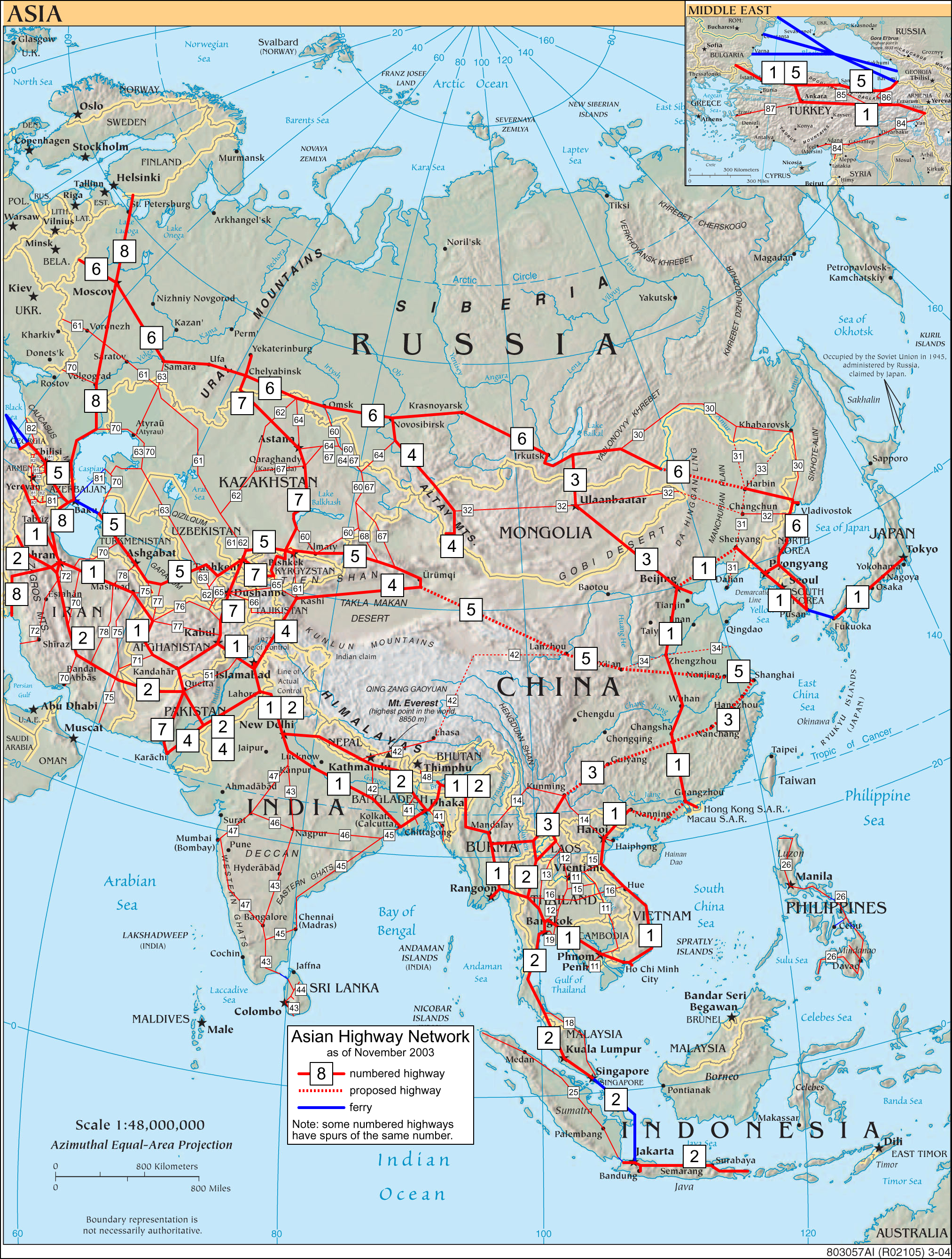
Map of the highways

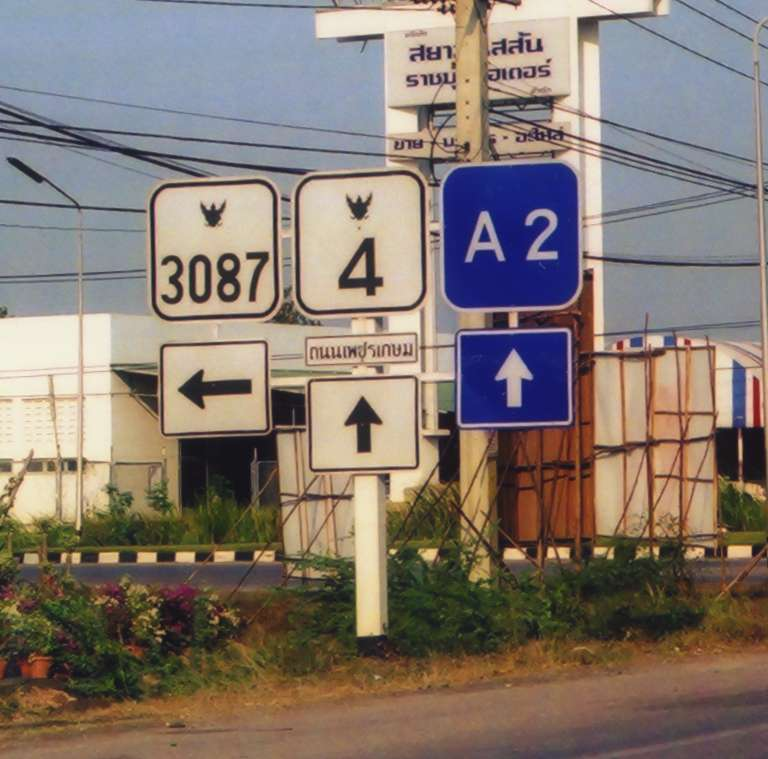
Asian Highway 2 sign near Ratchaburi, Thailand

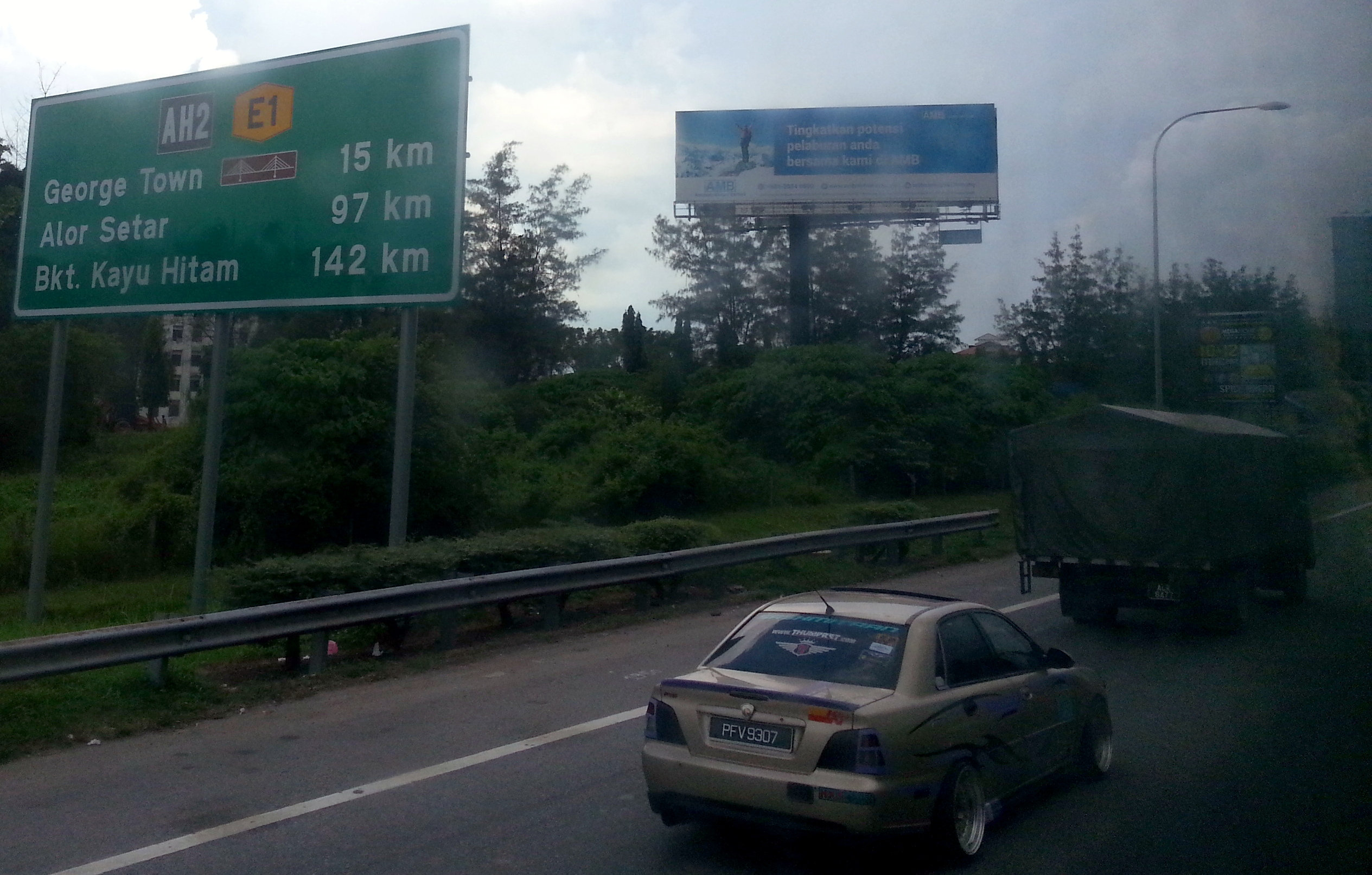
A section of Malaysia's North-South Expressway in Penang. Note the Asian Highway 2 signage.

Asian Highway route sign used on the AH6

The Asian Highway Network (AH), also known as the Great Asian Highway, is a cooperative project among countries in Asia and the United Nations Economic and Social Commission for Asia and the Pacific (ESCAP) to improve their connectivity via highway systems. It is one of the three pillars of the Asian Land Transport Infrastructure Development (ALTID) project, endorsed by the ESCAP commission at its 48th session in 1992, comprising Asian Highway, Trans-Asian Railway (TAR) and facilitation of land transport projects.

Agreements have been signed by 32 countries to allow the highway to cross the continent and also reach to Europe. Some of the countries taking part in the highway project are India (Act East policy), Sri Lanka, Pakistan, China, Iran, Japan, South Korea, Nepal and Bangladesh. Most of the funding comes from the larger, more advanced Asian nations such as China, South Korea and Singapore as well as international agencies such as the Asian Development Bank (ADB) and the Asian Infrastructure Investment Bank (AIIB).

The project aims to make maximum use of the continent's existing highways to avoid the construction of newer ones, except in cases where missing routes necessitate their construction. Project Monitor, an Asian infrastructure news website, has commented that "early beneficiaries of the Asian Highway project are the planners within the national land transport department of the participating countries [since] it assists them in planning the most cost-effective and efficient routes to promote domestic and international trade. Non-coastal areas, which are often negligible, are the other beneficiaries."

However, in the mid-2000s some transportation experts were skeptical about the viability of the project given the economic and political climate in both South and Southeast Asia.

== History ==
The AH project was initiated by the United Nations in 1959 with the aim of promoting the development of international road transport in the region. During the first phase of the project (1960–1970) considerable progress was achieved, however, progress slowed down when financial assistance was suspended in 1975.

ESCAP has conducted several projects in cooperation with AH member countries step by step after the endorsement of ALTID in 1992.

The Intergovernmental Agreement on the Asian Highway Network (IGA) was adopted on February 28, 1997, by the Intergovernmental Meeting; 37000 kilometers, and was adopted on November 18, 2003, by the Intergovernmental Meeting; the IGA includes Annex I, which identifies 55 AH routes among 32 member countries totalling approximately 140,000 km (87,500 miles), and Annex II "Classification and Design Standards". During the 60th session of the ESCAP Commission at Shanghai, China, in April 2004, the IGA treaty was signed by 23 countries. By 2013, 29 countries had ratified the agreement.

In 2007, British drivers Richard Meredith and Phil Colley completed the first full East to West journey of the entire highway in an Aston Martin Vantage which was later sold to raise money for UNICEF. The drive was a marketing stunt promoted by the car manufacturer.

== Implications ==
The advanced highway network would provide for greater trade and social interactions between Asian countries, including personal contacts, project capitalizations, connections of major container terminals with transportation points, and promotion of tourism via the new roadways. Infrastructure consultant Om Prakash noted that, "It's an excellent step taken by ESCAP to gather all the Asian countries under one crown but the problem with this project is political disputes between some countries, notably Pakistan and Myanmar, which is delaying the project."

== Future development plans ==
Route AH1 is proposed to extend from Tokyo to the border with Bulgaria (EU) west of Istanbul and Edirne, passing through both Koreas, China and other countries in Southeast, Central and South Asia. The corridor is expected to improve trade links between East Asian countries, India and Russia. To complete the route, existing roads will be upgraded and new roads constructed to link the network. US$25 billion has been spent or committed as of 2007, with additional US$18 billion needed for upgrades and improvements to 26,000 kilometres (16,000 miles) of highway.

== Numbering and signage ==
The project new highway route numbers begin with "AH", standing for "Asian Highway", followed by one, two or three digits. Single-digit route numbers from 1 to 9 are assigned to major Asian Highway routes which cross more than one subregion. Two- and three-digit route numbers are assigned to indicate the routes within subregions, including those connecting to neighbouring subregions, and self-contained highway routes within the participating countries. Route numbers are printed in the Latin script and Hindu-Arabic numerals and may simply be added to existing signage, like the E-road network.

The actual design of the signs has not been standardized, only that the letters and digits are in white or black, but the color, shape and size of the sign being completely flexible. Most examples feature a blue rectangular shield with a white inscription (similar to German Autobahn signage) with further examples of white on green and black on white rectangular shields.

== Routes ==
=== AH1 to AH9: Continent-Wide Routes ===
  - East-West, from S to N: 2, 1 intermixed, 5, 9, 6.
  - North-South, from E to W: 1 (along East China), 3, 4, 7, 8.
- – 20,557 km (12,774 mi): Tokyo, Japan – Bulgarian border, Turkey
  - (Japan) Tokyo – Shibuya – Setagaya – Yokohama – Atsugi – Matsuda – Gotemba – Mishima – Fuji – Shizuoka – Fujieda – Kakegawa – Fukuroi – Hamamatsu – Toyokawa – Okazaki – Toyota – Nagoya – Ogaki – Hikone – Higashiomi – Otsu – Kyoto – Takatsuki – Osaka – Kobe – Akashi – Kakogawa – Himeji – Aioi – Akaiwa – Okayama – Asakuchi – Fukuyama – Mihara – Hiroshima – Iwakuni – Kudamatsu – Hofu – Yamaguchi – Shimonoseki – Kitakyushu – Koga – Fukuoka –
  - (South Korea) Busan – Yangsan – Ulsan – Gyeongju – Yeongcheon – Gyeongsan – Daegu – Gumi – Gimcheon – Yeongdong – Okcheon – Daejeon – Cheongju – Cheonan – Anseong – Osan – Suwon – Seongnam – Seoul – Goyang – Paju – Munsan –
  - (North Korea) Kaesong – Pyongyang – Sinuiju –
  - (China) Dandong – Shenyang – Beijing – Shijiazhuang – Zhengzhou – Xinyang – Wuhan – Changsha – Xiangtan – Hong Kong – Shenzhen – Guangzhou – Nanning – Youyiguan –
  - (Vietnam) Hữu Nghị – Đồng Đăng – Hanoi – Vinh – Đông Hà – Huế – Da Nang – Hội An – Nha Trang – Vũng Tàu – Biên Hòa – Ho Chi Minh City – Mộc Bài –
  - (Cambodia) Bavet – Phnom Penh – Poipet –
  - (Thailand) Aranyaprathet – Kabin Buri – Hin Kong – Bangkok – Bang Pa-in – Nakhon Sawan – Tak – Mae Sot –
  - (Myanmar) Myawaddy – Yangon – Payagyi – Meiktila – Mandalay – Tamu –
  - (India) Moreh – Imphal – Viswema – Kohima – Chümoukedima – Dimapur – Nagaon – Guwahati – Jorabat – Shillong – Dawki –
  - (Bangladesh) Tamabil – Sylhet – Kachpur – Dhaka – Jashore – Benapole –
  - (India) Petrapole – Kolkata – Dhanbad – Gaya – Sasaram – Varanasi – Kanpur – Agra – New Delhi – Attari –
  - (Pakistan) Wagah – Lahore – Islamabad – Rawalpindi – Hassan Abdal – Peshawar –
  - (Afghanistan) Torkham – Kabul – Kandahar – Delaram – Herat – Islam Qala –
  - (Iran) Dowqarun – Mashhad – Neishabour – Sabzevar – Damghan – Semnan – Tehran – Qazvin – Tabriz – Ivughli – Bazargan –
  - (Turkey) Gürbulak – Doğubayazıt – Aşkale – Refahiye – Sivas – Ankara – Gerede – Istanbul – Kapıkule
- – 13,177 km (8,188 mi): Denpasar, Indonesia – Khosravi, Iran
  - (Indonesia) Denpasar – Surabaya – Surakarta – Semarang – Cikampek (– Bandung) – Jakarta (– Merak) –
  - Singapore – Singapore –
  - (Malaysia) Johor Bahru – Seremban – Kuala Lumpur – Butterworth – Bukit Kayu Hitam –
  - (Thailand) Sadao – Hat Yai – Bangkok – Bang Pa-in – Nakhon Sawan – Tak – Chiang Rai – Mae Sai –
  - (Myanmar) Tachilek – Kengtung – Meiktila – Mandalay – Tamu –
  - (India) Moreh – Imphal – Viswema – Kohima – Chümoukedima – Dimapur – Nagaon – Jorabat (– Guwahati) – Shillong – Dawki –
  - (Bangladesh) Tamabil – Sylhet – Kachpur – Dhaka – Hatikumrul – Rangpur – Banglabandha –
  - (India) Siliguri –
  - (Nepal) Kakarbhitta – Pathlaiya – Narayangarh – Kohalpur – Mahendranagar – Bramhadev Mandi –
  - (India) Banbasa – Rampur – New Delhi – Attari –
  - (Pakistan) Wagah – Lahore – Multan – Rohri – Quetta – Taftan –
  - (Iran) Mirjaveh – Zahedan – Kerman – Anar – Yazd – Salafchegan (– Tehran) – Saveh – Hamadan – Khosravi
- – 7,331 km (4,555 mi):
  - Northern section: Ulan-Ude, Russia – Tanggu, China
    - (Russia) Ulan-Ude – Kyakhta –
    - (Mongolia) Altanbulag – Darkhan – Ulaanbaatar – Nalaikh – Choir – Sainshand – Zamyn-Üüd –
    - (China) Erenhot – Beijing – Tanggu
  - Southern section: Shanghai, China – Chiang Rai, Thailand
    - (China) Shanghai – Hangzhou – Nanchang – Xiangtan – Guiyang – Kunming – Jinghong (– Daluo – (Myanmar) Mong La – Keng Tung) – Mohan, Yunnan –
    - (Laos) Boten – Nateuy – Houayxay –
    - (Thailand) Chiang Khong – Chiang Rai
- – 6,024 km (3,743 mi): Novosibirsk, Russia – Karachi, Pakistan
  - (Russia) Novosibirsk – Barnaul – Tashanta –
  - (Mongolia) Ulaanbaishint – Ölgii – Khovd – Yarantai
  - (China) Ürümqi – Kashgar – Honqiraf –
  - (Pakistan) Khunjerab – Hassanabdal – Rawalpindi – Islamabad – Lahore – Multan – Rohri – Hyderabad – Karachi
- – 10,380 km (6,450 mi): Shanghai, China – Bulgarian border, Turkey
  - (Turkey) Border of Bulgaria – Kapikule – Istanbul – Gerede – Merzifon – Samsun – Trabzon – Sarp –
  - (Georgia (country)) Batumi – Poti – Senaki – (Port of Anaklia – Zugdidi bypass road – Samtredia) Khashuri – Mtskheta – Tbilisi –
  - (Azerbaijan) Red Bridge – Qazax – Ganja – Gazi Mammed – Alat – Baku ...
  - (Turkmenistan) Turkmenbashi – Serdar – Ashgabat – Tejen – Mary – Turkmenabat – Farap –
  - (Uzbekistan) Olot – Bukhara – Navoi – Samarkand – Syrdaria – Tashkent – Chernyavka –
  - (Kazakhstan) Chernyaevka – Shymkent – Merki –
  - (Kyrgyzstan) Chaldovar – Kara Balta – Bishkek –
  - (Kazakhstan) Kordai – Kaskelen – Almaty –
  - (China) Khorgas – Jinghe – Kuytun – Ürümqi – Turpan – Lanzhou – Xi'an – Xinyang – Nanjing – Shanghai
- – 10,475 km (6,509 mi): Busan, South Korea – Belarusian border, Russia
  - (Russia) Border of Belarus – Krasnoye – Moscow – Samara – Ufa – Chelyabinsk – Petukhovo –
  - (Kazakhstan) Chistoe – Petropavl – Karakoga –
  - (Russia) Isilkul – Omsk – Novosibirsk – Krasnoyarsk – Irkutsk – Ulan-Ude – Chita – Zabaykalsk –
  - (China) Manzhouli – Qiqihar – Harbin – Suifenhe –
  - (Russia) Pogranichny – Ussuriysk – Razdolnoye (– Vladivostok – Nahodka) – Khasan –
  - (North Korea) Sonbong – Chongjin – Wonsan (– Pyongyang) –
  - (South Korea) Goseong – Ganseong – Gangneung – Gyeongju – Busan
- – 5,868 km (3,646 mi): Yekaterinburg, Russia – Karachi, Pakistan
  - (Russia) Yekaterinburg – Chelyabinsk – Troisk –
  - (Kazakhstan) Kaerak – Kostanai – Astana – Karaganda – Burubaital – Merke –
  - (Kyrgyzstan) Chaldovar – Kara-Balta – Osh (Kyrgyzstan) –
  - (Uzbekistan) Andijon – Tashkent – Syrdaria – Khavast –
  - (Tajikistan) Khujand – Dushanbe – Nizhniy Panj –
  - (Afghanistan) Shirkhan – Pol-e Khomri – Jabal Saraj – Kabul – Kandahar – Spin Boldak –
  - (Pakistan) Chaman – Quetta – Kalat – Karachi
- – 4,907 km (3,049 mi): Finnish border, Russia – Bandar Emam, Iran
  - (Russia) Border of Finland – Torfyanovka – Vyborg – St. Petersburg – Moscow – Tambov – Borisoglebsk – Volgograd – Astrakhan – Khasavyurt – Mahachkala – Kazmalyarskiy –
  - (Azerbaijan) Samur – Sumgayit – Baku – Alat – Bilasuvar – Astara –
  - (Iran) Rasht – Qazvin – Tehran – Saveh – Ahvaz – Bandar-e Emam Khomeyni
- – 9,222 km (5,730 mi): St. Petersburg, Russia – Lianyungang, China
  - (Russia) St. Petersburg – Moscow – Ulyanovsk – Toliatti – Samara – Orenburg – Sagarchin –
  - (Kazakhstan) Zhaisan – Aktobe – Kyzylorda – Shymkent – Taraz – Almaty –
  - (China) Khorgas – Urumqi – Lianyungang

=== AH10 to AH29: Southeast Asia Routes ===
- – 1,588 km (987 mi): Vientiane, Laos – Sihanoukville, Cambodia
  - (Laos) Vientiane – Ban Lao – Thakhek – Seno – Pakse – Veunkham – Tranpeangkreal –
  - (Cambodia) Stung Treng – Kratie – Phnom Penh – Sihanoukville
- – 1,195 km (743 mi): Nateuy, Laos – Hin Kong, Thailand
  - (Laos) Nateuy – Oudomxai – Pakmong – Louang Phrabang – Vientiane – Thanaleng –
  - (Thailand) Nong Khai – Udon Thani – Khon Kaen – Nakhon Ratchasima – Hin Kong
- – 1,429 km (888 mi): Hanoi, Vietnam – Nakhon Sawen, Thailand
  - (Vietnam) Hanoi – Hoa Binh – Son La – Dien Bien – Tây Trang –
  - (Laos) Pang Hok – Muang Khoua – Oudomxai – Muang Ngeun –
  - (Thailand) Huai Kon – Uttaradit – Phitsanulok – Nakhon Sawan
- – 2,077 km (1,291 mi): Hai Phong, Vietnam – Mandalay, Myanmar
  - (Vietnam) Hai Phong – Hanoi – Viet Tri – Lao Cai –
  - (China) Hekou – Kunming – Ruili –
  - (Myanmar) Muse – Lashio – Mandalay
- – 566 km (352 mi): Vinh, Vietnam – Udon Thani, Thailand
  - (Vietnam) Vinh – Cau Treo –
  - (Laos) Keoneau – Ban Lao – Thakhek –
  - (Thailand) Nakhon Phanom – Udon Thani
- – 1,032 km (641 mi): Đông Hà, Vietnam – Tak, Thailand
  - (Vietnam) Đông Hà – Lao Bao –
  - (Laos) Densavanh – Seno – Savannakhet –
  - (Thailand) Mukdahan – Khon Kaen – Phitsanulok – Tak
- – 980 km (610 mi): Đà Nẵng, Vietnam – Vũng Tàu, Vietnam
  - (Vietnam) Đà Nẵng – Kon Tum – Pleiku – Ho Chi Minh – Vũng Tàu
- – 1,042 km (647 mi): Hat Yai, Thailand – Johor Bahru Causeway, Malaysia
  - (Thailand) Hat Yai – Sungai Kolok –
  - (Malaysia) Rantau Panjang – Kota Bahru – Kuantan – Johor Bahru – Johor Bahru Causeway
- – 459 km (285 mi): Nakhon Ratchasima, Thailand – Bangkok, Thailand
  - (Thailand) Nakhon Ratchasima – Kabin Buri – Laem Chabang – Chonburi – Bangkok
- – length unknown: Qui Nhơn, Vietnam – Serei Saophoan, Cambodia
  - (Vietnam) Quy Nhon port – Pleiku – Le Thanh –
  - (Cambodia) O Yadav – Banlung – Stung Treng – Preah Vihear – Siem Reap – Serei Saophoan
- Trans-Sumatran Highway (Eastern Route) – 2,549 km (1,584 mi): Banda Aceh, Indonesia – Merak, Indonesia
  - (Indonesia) Banda Aceh – Medan – Tebingtinggi – Dumai – Pekanbaru – Jambi – Palembang – Tanjung Karang – Bakauheni ... Merak
- Pan-Philippine Highway – 3,379.73 km (2,100.07 mi): Laoag, Philippines – Zamboanga, Philippines
  - (Philippines) Laoag – Tuguegarao – Guiguinto – Quezon City (– Manila – Makati) – Makati – Calamba – Legazpi – Matnog ... Allen – Tacloban (– Ormoc City ... Cebu City) – Liloan ... Surigao – Butuan – Davao (– Cagayan de Oro) – General Santos – Cotabato City – Zamboanga

=== AH30 to AH39: East Asia and Northeast Asia Routes ===
| Route No. | Distance | Start | End | Notes |
|---|---|---|---|---|
| AH30 | 2,739 km (1712 miles) | Ussuriysk, Russia | Chita, Russia | |
| AH31 | 1,595 km (997 miles) | Belogorsk, Russia | Dalian, China | |
| AH32 | 3,748 km (2342.5 miles) | Sonbong, North Korea | Khovd, Mongolia | |
| AH33 | 575 km (359 miles) | Harbin, China | Tongjiang, China | Also known as G1011 |
| AH34 | 1,033 km (646 miles) | Lianyungang, China | Xi'an, China | |
| AH35 | 1,305 km (811 miles) | Undurkhaan, Mongolia | Jinzhou, China | |

=== AH40 to AH59: South Asian Routes ===
| Route No. | Distance | Start | End |
|---|---|---|---|
| AH41 | 948 km (592.5 miles) | Teknaf, Bangladesh | Mongla, Bangladesh |
| AH42 | 3,754 km (2346 miles) | Lanzhou, China | Barhi, India |
| AH43 | 3,024 km (1892 miles) | Agra, India | Matara, Sri Lanka (Via) Rameswaram, TN, IN |
| AH44(A6) | 107 km (67 miles) | Dambulla, Sri Lanka | Trincomalee, Sri Lanka |
| AH45 | 2,030 km (1269 miles) | Kolkata, India | Krishnagiri, TN, IN (Via) Chennai, TN, India |
| AH46 | 1,967 km (1,222 miles) | Hazira port, Surat, India | Howrah, India |
| AH47 | 2,057 km (1286 miles) | Gwalior, India | Bengaluru, Karnataka, India |
| AH48 | 276 km (171 miles) | Thimphu, Bhutan | Changrabandha, India |
| AH51 | 825 km (513 miles) | Peshawar, Pakistan | Quetta, Pakistan |

=== AH60 to AH89: North Asia, Central Asia and Southwest Asia Routes ===
| Route No. | Distance | Start | End |
|---|---|---|---|
| AH60 | 2,151 km (1344 miles) | Omsk, Russia (on AH6) | Burubaital, Kazakhstan (on AH7) |
| AH61 | 4,158 km (2599 miles) | Kashgar, China (on AH4/AH65) | border between Russia and Ukraine |
| AH62 | 2,722 km (1701 miles) | Petropavl, Kazakhstan (on AH6/AH64) | Mazari Sharif, Afghanistan (on AH76) |
| AH63 | 2,434 km (1521 miles) | Samara, Russia (on AH6) | Guzar, Uzbekistan (on AH62) |
| AH64 | 1,666 km (1041 miles) | Petropavl, Kazakhstan (on AH6/AH62) | Barnaul, Russia (on AH4) |
| AH65 | 1,250 km (781 miles) | Kashgar, China (on AH4/AH61) | Termez, Uzbekistan (on AH62) |
| AH66 | 995 km (622 miles) | border between China and Tajikistan | Termez, Uzbekistan (on AH62) |
| AH67 | 2,288 km (1430 miles) | Kuitun, China (on AH5) | Zhezkazgan, Kazakhstan (on AH62) |
| AH68 | 278 km (174 miles) | Jinghe, China (on AH5) | Ucharal, Kazakhstan (on AH60) |
| AH70 | 4,832 km (3020 miles) | border between Ukraine and Russia | Bandar Abbas, Iran |
| AH71 | 426 km (266 miles) | Dilaram, Afghanistan (on AH1) | Dashtak, Iran (on AH75) |
| AH72 | 1,147 km (717 miles) | Tehran, Iran (on AH1/AH2/AH8) | Bushehr, Iran (on AH88) |
| AH75 | 1,871 km (1169 miles) | Tejen, Turkmenistan (on AH5) | Chabahar, Iran (on AH88) |
| AH76 | 986 km (616 miles) | Puli Khumri, Afghanistan (on AH7) | Herat, Afghanistan (on AH1/AH77) |
| AH77 | 1,298 km (811 miles) | Jabal Saraj District, Afghanistan (on AH7) | Mary, Turkmenistan (on AH5) |
| AH78 | 1,076 km (672.5 miles) | Ashgabat, Turkmenistan (on AH5) | Kerman, Iran (on AH2) |
| AH81 | 1,143 km (714 miles) | Larsi, Georgia | Aktau, Kazakhstan (on AH70) |
| AH82 | 1,261 km (788 miles) | border between Russia and Georgia | Ivughli, Iran (on AH1) |
| AH83 | 172 km (107.5 miles) | Qazakh, Azerbaijan (on AH5) | Yerevan, Armenia (on AH81/AH82) |
| AH84 | 1,188 km (742.5 miles) | Doğubeyazıt, Turkey (on AH1) | İçel, Turkey |
| AH85 | 338 km (211 miles) | Refahiye, Turkey (on AH1) | Merzifon, Turkey (on AH5) |
| AH86 | 247 km (154 miles) | Askale, Turkey (on AH1) | Trabzon, Turkey (on AH5) |
| AH87 | 606 km (378.75 miles) | Ankara, Turkey (on AH1) | İzmir, Turkey |
| AH88 | 1,700 km (1050 miles) | Chabahar, Iran (on AH75) | Bandar Imam Khomeini, Iran (on AH8) |

==== AH100 to AH299: ASEAN Southeast Asia Routes ====
These routes were set up by the Association of Southeast Asian Nations as part of an extension to the Asian Highway Network, known as the ASEAN Highway Network.

| Route No. | Distance | Start | End | Notes |
|---|---|---|---|---|
| AH111 | | Loilem, Myanmar | Thibaw, Myanmar | |
| AH112 | | Thaton, Myanmar | Kawthaung, Myanmar | |
| AH121 | | Mukdahan, Thailand | Sa Kaeo, Thailand | |
| AH123 | | Dawei, Myanmar | Pak Tho on AH2 in Thailand | |
| AH131 | | Vũng Áng, Vietnam | Thakhek, Laos | |
| AH132 | | Quảng Ngãi, Vietnam | Thang Beng, Laos | |
| AH140 | | Butterworth, Malaysia | Pasir Puteh, Malaysia | |
| AH141 | 272 km (169 mi) | Port Klang Malaysia | Kuantan, Malaysia | |
| AH142 | 200 km (120 mi) | Yong Peng, Malaysia | Gambang, Malaysia | |
| AH143 | 28 km (17 mi) | Sengkang, Singapore | Senai, Malaysia | |
| AH150 | 2,083 km (1,294 mi) | Telok Melano, Sarawak | Entikong, West Kalimantan | Also known as the Pan-Borneo Highway |
| AH151 | | Tebing Tinggi, North Sumatra | Bandar Lampung, Lampung | Also known as the Central Trans-Sumatran Highway. The highway is also co-signed as Sumatra by the Ministry of Transportation (Indonesia) since 2019. |
| AH152 | | Jakarta | Surakarta, Central Java | The highway is also co-signed by some Indonesian National Route Java by the Ministry of Transportation (Indonesia) since 2019. |

== Distance by country or region ==
The planned network runs a total of 140,479 kilometres (87,290 mi).

| Country or region | Distance in km (mi) |
|---|---|
| Afghanistan | 4,247 km (2,639 mi) |
| Armenia | 958 km (595 mi) |
| Azerbaijan | 1,442 km (896 mi) |
| Bangladesh | 1,804 km (1,121 mi) |
| Bhutan | 1 km (0.62 mi) |
| Cambodia | 1,339 km (832 mi) |
| China | 25,579 km (15,894 mi) |
| Georgia | 1,154 km (717 mi) |
| Hong Kong | 91 km (57 mi) |
| India | 27,987 km (17,390 mi) |
| Indonesia | 3,989 km (2,479 mi) |
| Iran | 11,152 km (6,930 mi) |
| Japan | 1,200 km (750 mi) |
| Kazakhstan | 13,189 km (8,195 mi) |
| North Korea | 1,320 km (820 mi) |
| Republic of Korea | 907 km (564 mi) |
| Kyrgyzstan | 1,695 km (1,053 mi) |
| Laos | 2,297 km (1,427 mi) |
| Malaysia | 4,006 km (2,489 mi) |
| Mongolia | 4,286 km (2,663 mi) |
| Myanmar | 3,003 km (1,866 mi) |
| Nepal | 1,321 km (821 mi) |
| Pakistan | 5,377 km (3,341 mi) |
| Philippines | 3,517 km (2,185 mi) |
| Russia | 16,869 km (10,482 mi) |
| Singapore | 38 km (24 mi) |
| Sri Lanka | 650 km (400 mi) |
| Tajikistan | 1,925 km (1,196 mi) |
| Thailand | 5,112 km (3,176 mi) |
| Turkey | 5,254 km (3,265 mi) |
| Turkmenistan | 2,204 km (1,370 mi) |
| Uzbekistan | 2,966 km (1,843 mi) |
| Vietnam | 2,678 km (1,664 mi) |

== See also ==
- Other intercontinental highway systems: International E-road network, Pan-American Highway, Arab Mashreq International Road Network and Trans-African Highway network
- Trans-Asian Railway
- Japan–Korea Undersea Tunnel
- G3 Beijing–Taipei Expressway
- Seikan Tunnel
- One Belt, One Road
- Eurasian Land Bridge
- Bering land bridge
- Hippie trail
