= Krasny =

Krasny, Krasnaya, or Krasnoye may refer to:

- Krasny (surname), a Russian language surname

== Places ==
- Krasny, Russia or Krasnaya or Krasnoye, several inhabited localities in Russia
- Krasni, Nagorno-Karabakh, a village in the Republic of Artsakh
- Krasnaya (river), a river in Kaliningrad Oblast, Russia
- Krasnaya Hotel, former name of Bristol Hotel, Odesa, Ukraine

== See also ==
- Krasnoselsk (disambiguation)
- Krasny Khutor (disambiguation)
- Krasny Oktyabr (disambiguation)
