= Konny Mogoy =

Konny Mogoy Конный Могой
- Selo
- Location within Astrakhan Oblast Location within Russia
- Coordinates: 46°26′N 48°48′E
- Country: Russia
- Region: Astrakhan Oblast
- District: Volodarsky District
- Time zone: UTC+4:00

Konny Mogoy (Russian: Конный Могой) is a rural locality (a selo) in Novokrasinsky Selsoviet of Volodarsky District, Astrakhan Oblast, Russia. The population was 122 as of 2010. There are 5 streets.

== Geography ==
Konny Mogoy is located on the Konnaya River, 25 km (16 mi) east of Volodarsky (the district's administrative centre) by road. Novokrasnoye is the nearest rural locality.
