= Narimanovo =

Narimanovo Нариманово
- Selo
- Location within Astrakhan Oblast Location within Russia
- Coordinates: 46°22′N 48°54′E
- Country: Russia
- Region: Astrakhan Oblast
- District: Volodarsky District

Narimanovo (Russian: Нариманово) is a rural locality (a selo) in Kalininsky Selsoviet of Volodarsky District, Astrakhan Oblast, Russia. The population was 123 as of 2010.

== Geography ==
Narimanovo is located on the Karabuzan River, 33 kilometres (21 mi) east of Volodarsky (the district's administrative centre) by road. Kalinino is the nearest rural locality.
