= Korni, Astrakhan Oblast =

Korni Корни
- Selo
- Location within Astrakhan Oblast Location within Russia
- Coordinates: 46°16′N 48°36′E
- Country: Russia
- Region: Astrakhan Oblast
- District: Volodarsky District
- Time zone: UTC+4:00

Korni (Russian: Корни) is a rural locality (a selo) in Novinsky Selsoviet of Volodarsky District, Astrakhan Oblast, Russia. The population was 6 as of 2010. There is 1 street.

== Geography ==
Korni is located on the Kornevaya River, 25 km (16 mi) southeast of Volodarsky (the district's administrative centre) by road. Krutoye is the nearest rural locality.
