= Sarmantayevka =

Sarmantayevka Сармантаевка
- Selo
- Location within Astrakhan Oblast Location within Russia
- Coordinates: 46°19′N 48°46′E
- Country: Russia
- Region: Astrakhan Oblast
- District: Volodarsky District
- Time zone: UTC+4:00

Sarmantayevka (Russian: Сармантаевка) is a rural locality (a selo) in Multanovsky Selsoviet of Volodarsky District, Astrakhan Oblast, Russia. The population was 152 as of 2010. There is 1 street.

== Geography ==
Sarmantayevka is located 24 km (15 mi) southeast of Volodarsky (the district's administrative centre) by road. Multanovo is the nearest rural locality.
