= Boldyrevo =

Boldyrevo Болдырево
- Selo
- Location within Astrakhan Oblast Location within Russia
- Coordinates: 46°21′N 48°34′E
- Country: Russia
- Region: Astrakhan Oblast
- District: Volodarsky District
- Time zone: UTC+4:00

Boldyrevo (Russian: Болдырево) is a rural locality (a selo) in Bolshemogoysky Selsoviet of Volodarsky District, Astrakhan Oblast, Russia. The population was 557 as of 2010.

== Geography ==
It is located on the Kornevaya and Zeleninskaya Rivers, 8 km (5.0 mi) south of Volodarsky (the district's administrative centre) by road. Meneshau is the nearest rural locality.
