= Koshevanka =

Koshevanka Кошеванка
- Selo
- Location within Astrakhan Oblast Location within Russia
- Coordinates: 46°14′N 48°31′E
- Country: Russia
- Region: Astrakhan Oblast
- District: Volodarsky District
- Time zone: UTC+4:00

Koshevanka (Russian: Кошеванка) is a rural locality (a selo) in Altynzharsky Selsoviet of Volodarsky District, Astrakhan Oblast, Russia. The population was 321 as of 2010. There are 4 streets.

== Geography ==
It is located on the Karazhar River, 22 km (14 mi) south of Volodarsky (the district's administrative centre) by road. Tumak is the nearest rural locality.
