= Shagano-Kondakovka =

Shagano-Kondakovka Шагано-Кондаковка
- Selo
- Location within Astrakhan Oblast Location within Russia
- Coordinates: 46°26′N 48°32′E
- Country: Russia
- Region: Astrakhan Oblast
- District: Volodarsky District
- Time zone: UTC+4:00

Shagano-Kondakovka (Russian: Шагано-Кондаковка; Kazakh: Шаған) is a rural locality (a selo) in Kozlovsky Selsoviet of Volodarsky District, Astrakhan Oblast, Russia. The population was 316 as of 2010. There are 3 streets.

== Geography ==
Shagano-Kondakovka is located on the Buzan River, 8 km (5.0 mi) north of Volodarsky (the district's administrative centre) by road. Kozlovo is the nearest rural locality.
