= Chyorny Bugor =

Chyorny Bugor Чёрный Бугор
- Settlement
- Location within Astrakhan Oblast Location within Russia
- Coordinates: 46°19′N 48°37′E
- Country: Russia
- Region: Astrakhan Oblast
- District: Volodarsky District
- Time zone: UTC+4:00

Chyorny Bugor (Russian: Чёрный Бугор) is a rural locality (a settlement) in Bolshemogoysky Selsoviet of Volodarsky District, Astrakhan Oblast, Russia. The population was 20 as of 2010. There is 1 street.

== Geography ==
Chyorny Bugor is located on the Sarbay River, 16 km (9.9 mi) southeast of Volodarsky (the district's administrative centre) by road. Bolshoy Mogoy is the nearest rural locality.
