= Verkhniye Kolki =

Verkhniye Kolki Верхние Колки
- Selo
- Location within Astrakhan Oblast Location within Russia
- Coordinates: 46°15′N 48°45′E
- Country: Russia
- Region: Astrakhan Oblast
- District: Volodarsky District
- Time zone: UTC+4:00

Verkhniye Kolki (Russian: Верхние Колки) is a rural locality (a selo) in Bolshemogoysky Selsoviet of Volodarsky District, Astrakhan Oblast, Russia. The population was 41 as of 2010. There is 1 street.

== Geography ==
Verkhniye Kolki is located 30 km (19 mi) southeast of Volodarsky (the district's administrative centre) by road. Churkin is the nearest rural locality.
