= Meshkovo =

Meshkovo Мешково
- Selo
- Location within Astrakhan Oblast Location within Russia
- Coordinates: 46°22′N 48°39′E
- Country: Russia
- Region: Astrakhan Oblast
- District: Volodarsky District
- Time zone: UTC+4:00

Meshkovo (Russian: Мешково) is a rural locality (a selo) in Kozlovsky Selsoviet of Volodarsky District, Astrakhan Oblast, Russia. The population was 118 as of 2010. There are 3 streets.

== Geography ==
Meshkovo is located 12 km (7.5 mi) southeast of Volodarsky (the district's administrative centre) by road. Ilyinka is the nearest rural locality.
