= Paromny =

Paromny Паромный
- Settlement
- Location within Astrakhan Oblast Location within Russia
- Coordinates: 46°24′N 48°33′E
- Country: Russia
- Region: Astrakhan Oblast
- District: Volodarsky District
- Time zone: UTC+4:00

Paromny (Russian: Паромный) is a rural locality (a settlement) in Kozlovsky Selsoviet of Volodarsky District, Astrakhan Oblast, Russia. The population was 868 as of 2010. There are 4 streets.

== Geography ==
Paromny is located 3 km (1.9 mi) east of Volodarsky (the district's administrative centre) by road. Kozlovo is the nearest rural locality.
