= Churkin, Astrakhan Oblast =

Churkin Чуркин
- Settlement
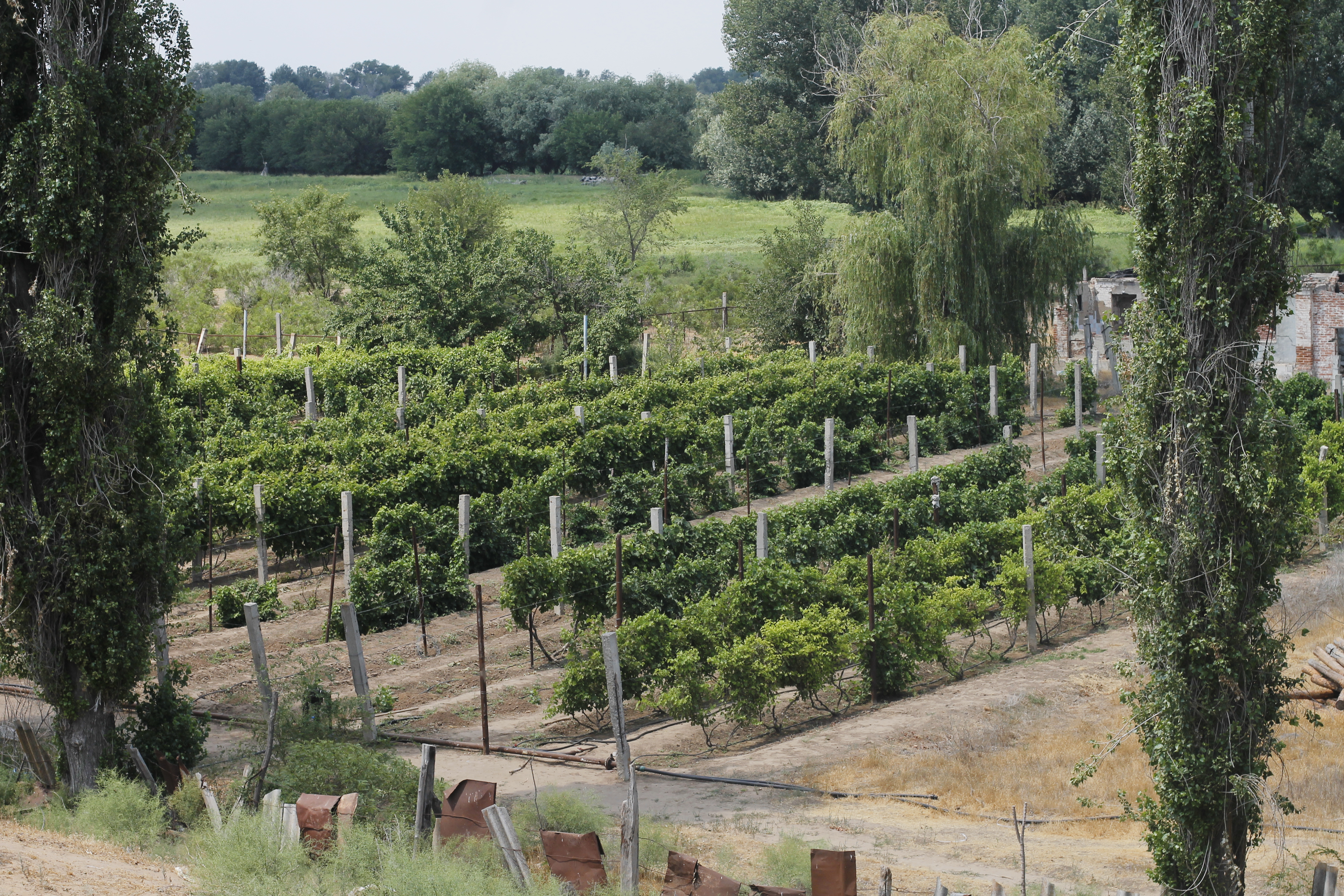

- Location within Astrakhan Oblast Location within Russia
- Coordinates: 46°18′N 48°43′E
- Country: Russia
- Region: Astrakhan Oblast
- District: Volodarsky District
- Time zone: UTC+4:00

Churkin (Russian: Чуркин) is a rural locality (a settlement) in Bolshemogoysky Selsoviet of Volodarsky District, Astrakhan Oblast, Russia. The population was 58 as of 2010. There are 3 streets.

== Geography ==
Churkin is located 24 km (15 mi) southeast of Volodarsky (the district's administrative centre) by road. Yamnoye is the nearest rural locality.
