= Razino =

Razino Разино
- Selo
- Location within Astrakhan Oblast Location within Russia
- Coordinates: 46°12′N 48°42′E
- Country: Russia
- Region: Astrakhan Oblast
- District: Volodarsky District
- Time zone: UTC+4:00

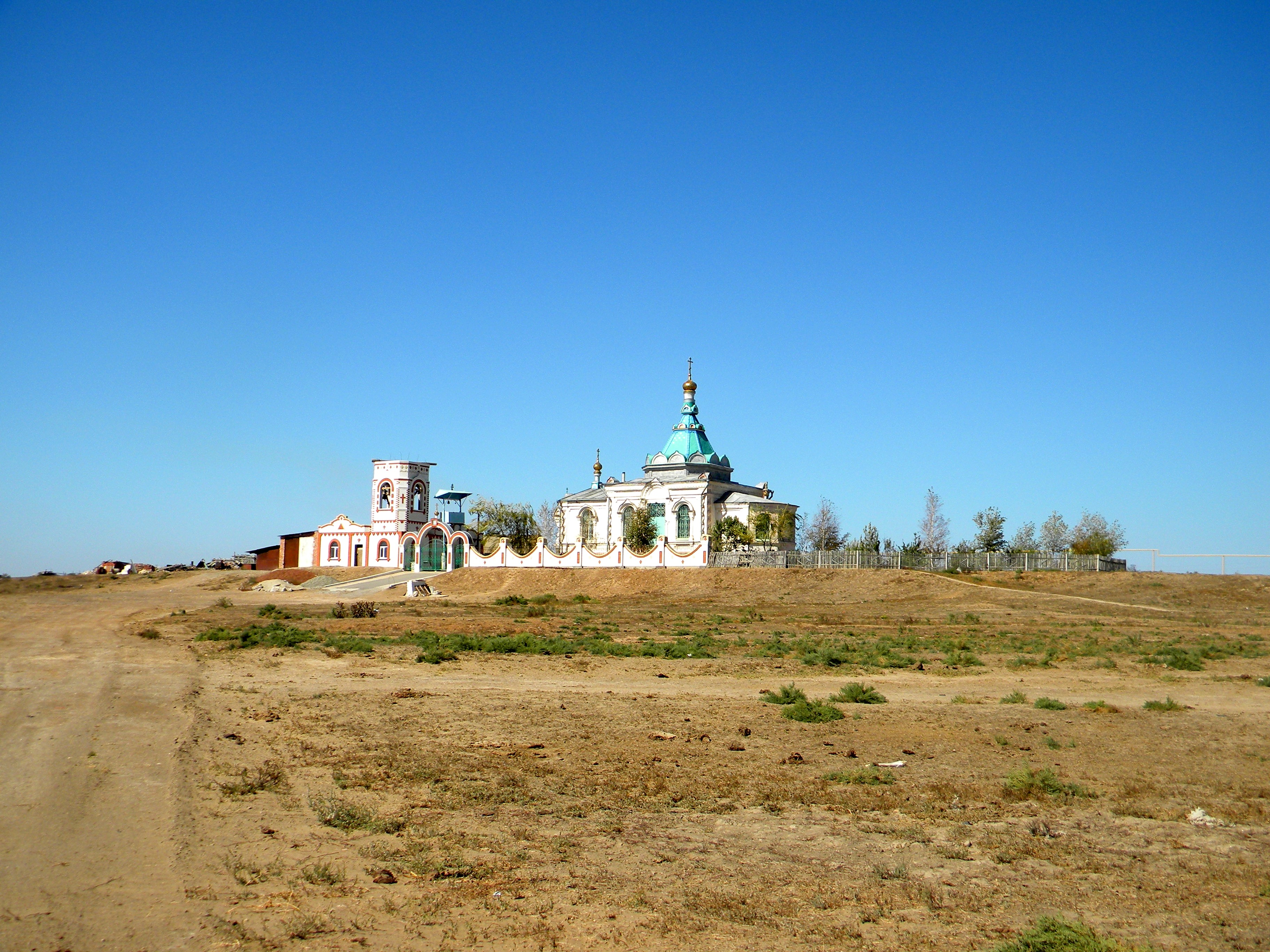
Church in the village of Razino, Volodarsky district

Razino (Russian: Разино) is a rural locality (a selo) in Tsvetnovsky Selsoviet of Volodarsky District, Astrakhan Oblast, Russia. The population was 23 as of 2010. There is 1 street.

== Geography ==
Razino is located 30 km (19 mi) southeast of Volodarsky (the district's administrative centre) by road. Tsvetnoye is the nearest rural locality.
