= Kazenny Bugor =

Kazenny Bugor Казенный Бугор
- Selo
- Location within Astrakhan Oblast Location within Russia
- Coordinates: 46°13′N 48°39′E
- Country: Russia
- Region: Astrakhan Oblast
- District: Volodarsky District
- Time zone: UTC+4:00

Kazenny Bugor (Russian: Казенный Бугор) is a rural locality (a selo) in Altynzharsky Selsoviet of Volodarsky District, Astrakhan Oblast, Russia. The population was 161 as of 2010. There are 4 streets.

== Geography ==
Kazenny Bugor is located 30 km (19 mi) southeast of Volodarsky (the district's administrative centre) by road. Krutoye is the nearest rural locality.
