= Yablonka =

Yablonka Яблонка
- Selo
- Location within Astrakhan Oblast Location within Russia
- Coordinates: 46°13′N 48°22′E
- Country: Russia
- Region: Astrakhan Oblast
- District: Volodarsky District
- Time zone: UTC+4:00

Yablonka (Russian: Яблонка) is a rural locality (a selo) in Sizobugorsky Selsoviet of Volodarsky District, Astrakhan Oblast, Russia. The population was 425 as of 2010. There are 2 streets.

== Geography ==
Yablonka is located 42 km (26 mi) southwest of Volodarsky (the district's administrative centre) by road. Akhterek is the nearest rural locality.
