= Krasny, Astrakhan Oblast =

Krasny Красный
- Settlement
- Location within Astrakhan Oblast Location within Russia
- Coordinates: 46°03′N 48°38′E
- Country: Russia
- Region: Astrakhan Oblast
- District: Volodarsky District
- Time zone: UTC+4:00

Krasny (Russian: Красный) is a rural locality (a settlement) in Tishkovsky Selsoviet of Volodarsky District, Astrakhan Oblast, Russia. The population was 173 as of 2010. There is 1 street.

== Geography ==
Krasny is located 117 km (73 mi) south of Volodarsky (the district's administrative centre) by road. Tishkovo is the nearest rural locality.
