= Krasny Khutor =

Krasny Khutor may refer to

- Krasny Khutor (Belgorod Oblast), Russia
- Krasny Khutor (Krasnozyorsky District), Novosibirsk Oblast, Russia
- Krasny Khutor, Kursk Oblast, Russia
- Krasnı Xutor, Khachmaz Rayon, Azerbaijan
