= Trubny, Astrakhan Oblast =

Trubny Трубный
- Settlement
- Location within Astrakhan Oblast Location within Russia
- Coordinates: 46°23′N 48°32′E
- Country: Russia
- Region: Astrakhan Oblast
- District: Volodarsky District
- Time zone: UTC+4:00

Trubny (Russian: Трубный) is a rural locality (a settlement) in Aktyubinsky Selsoviet of Volodarsky District, Astrakhan Oblast, Russia. The population was 715 as of 2010. There are 11 streets.

== Geography ==
Trubny is located 3 km (1.9 mi) south of Volodarsky (the district's administrative centre) by road. Volodarsky is the nearest rural locality.
