= Trubny =

Trubny (masculine), Trubnaya (feminine), or Trubnoye (neuter) may refer to:

- Trubny, Astrakhan Oblast, Russia
- Trubnaya (Moscow Metro)
