= Tishkovo =

Tishkovo Тишково
- Selo
- Location within Astrakhan Oblast Location within Russia
- Coordinates: 46°01′N 48°36′E
- Country: Russia
- Region: Astrakhan Oblast
- District: Volodarsky District
- Time zone: UTC+4:00

Tishkovo (Russian: Тишково) is a rural locality (a selo) and the administrative center of Tishkovsky Selsoviet of Volodarsky District, Astrakhan Oblast, Russia. The population was 1,638 as of 2010. There are 15 streets.

== Geography ==
Tishkovo is located 10 km (6.2 mi) south of Volodarsky (the district's administrative centre) by road. Grushevo is the nearest rural locality.
