= Verkhny Oseredok Island =

Verkhny Oseredok Верхний Осередок
- Island
- Location within Caspian Sea
- Coordinates: 46°8′N 49°10′E
- Country: Russia
- Oblast: Astrakhan Oblast

Verkhniy Oseredok Island is a large island in the Caspian Sea. It is located south of Tishkovo, right off the mouths of the Volga in an area where there are many delta islands.

Verkhniy Oseredok is long and wide. It is separated from the coast to its north by a very narrow channel, which is less than 300 m in some places. It has a length of almost 22 km and a maximum width of 11 km.

Administratively, Verkhniy Oseredok belongs to the Astrakhan Oblast of the Russian Federation.
