= Kudrino, Astrakhan Oblast =

Kudrino Кудрино
- Selo
- Location within Astrakhan Oblast Location within Russia
- Coordinates: 46°25′N 48°42′E
- Country: Russia
- Region: Astrakhan Oblast
- District: Volodarsky District
- Time zone: UTC+4:00

Kudrino (Russian: Кудрино) is a rural locality (a selo) in Krutovsky Selsoviet of Volodarsky District, Astrakhan Oblast, Russia. The population was 146 as of 2010. There are 2 streets.

== Geography ==
Kudrino is located 20 km (12 mi) east of Volodarsky (the district's administrative centre) by road. Marfino is the nearest rural locality.
