= Mecidoba =

- Location within Azerbaijan
- Coordinates: 41°34′22″N 48°47′48″E
- Country: Azerbaijan
- Rayon: Khachmaz
- Municipality: Yataqoba
- Time zone: UTC+4 (AZT)
  - Summer (DST): UTC+5 (AZT)

Mecidoba (also, Məçitoba and Medzhidoba) is a village in the Khachmaz Rayon of Azerbaijan. The village forms part of the municipality of Yataqoba.
