= Yataqoba =

- Municipality
- Location within Azerbaijan
- Coordinates: 41°34′35″N 48°48′10″E
- Country: Azerbaijan
- Rayon: Khachmaz

Population
  - Total: 1,045
- Time zone: UTC+4 (AZT)
  - Summer (DST): UTC+5 (AZT)

Yataqoba (also, Yatagoba) is a village and municipality in the Khachmaz Rayon of Azerbaijan. It has a population of 1,045. The municipality consists of the villages of Yataqoba, Krasnı Xutor, and Mecidoba.
