= Krasny (surname) =

Krasny is a Russian language surname from the Russian word for "red". Notable people with the name include:

- Alec Brook-Krasny (1958), American former politician
- Dmitry Krasny (died 1440), Russian nobleman
- Elke Krasny (1965), Austrian writer
- Michael Krasny (talk show host) (1944), American journalist, host of the radio talk show Forum
- Michael Krasny (businessman) (1952/1953), American businessman, founder of CDW
- Paul Krasny (1935–2001), American film and television director
- Robert Krasny, American physicist
- Sasha Krasny (1882–1995), pen-name of Aleksandr Davydovich Bryansky
- Yuri Krasny (1946), Russian educator
