= Bramhadev =

Brahmdev ब्रह्मदेव
- [Village]
- Location in Nepal
- Coordinates: 29.063953599557692°N 80.13055143824562°E
- Country: Nepal
- Province: Sudurpashchim Province
- District: Kanchanpur District

Population (1991)
  - Total: 1,769
- Time zone: UTC+5:45 (Nepal Time)

Brahmdev is a village in Kanchanpur District in Sudurpashchim Province of Nepal. At the time of the 1991 Nepal census it had a population of 1769 people living in 314 individual households.
