= Krasnaya, Arkhangelsk Oblast =

Krasnaya Красная
- Settlement
- Location within Arkhangelsk Oblast Location within Russia
- Coordinates: 62°27′N 46°45′E
- Country: Russia
- Region: Arkhangelsk Oblast
- District: Verkhnetoyemsky District
- Time zone: UTC+3:00

Krasnaya (Russian: Красная) is a rural locality (a settlement) and the administrative center of Gorkovskoye Rural Settlement of Verkhnetoyemsky District, Arkhangelsk Oblast, Russia. The population was 504 as of 2010.

== Geography ==
Krasnaya is located on the Pinega River, 111 km northeast of Verkhnyaya Toyma (the district's administrative centre) by road. Koda is the nearest rural locality.
