= Kudrino, Melenkovsky District, Vladimir Oblast =

Kudrino Кудрино
- Selo
- Location within Vladimir Oblast Location within Russia
- Coordinates: 55°10′N 41°38′E
- Country: Russia
- Region: Vladimir Oblast
- District: Melenkovsky District
- Time zone: UTC+3:00

Kudrino (Russian: Кудрино) is a rural locality (a selo) in Ilkinskoye Rural Settlement, Melenkovsky District, Vladimir Oblast, Russia. The population was 94 as of 2010. There are 3 streets.

== Geography ==
Kudrino is located on the Unzha River, 20 km south of Melenki (the district's administrative centre) by road. Kulaki is the nearest rural locality.
