= Krasny, Anninsky District, Voronezh Oblast =

Krasny Красный
- Settlement
- Location within Voronezh Oblast Location within Russia
- Coordinates: 51°29′N 41°06′E
- Country: Russia
- Region: Voronezh Oblast
- District: Anninsky District
- Time zone: UTC+3:00

Krasny (Russian: Красный) is a rural locality (a settlement) in Krasnologskoye Rural Settlement, Anninsky District, Voronezh Oblast, Russia. The population was 32 as of 2010.

== Geography ==
Krasny is located 54 km east of Anna (the district's administrative centre) by road. Krasny Log is the nearest rural locality.
