= Kudrino, Verkhovazhsky District, Vologda Oblast =

Kudrino Кудрино
- Village
- Location within Vologda Oblast Location within Russia
- Coordinates: 60°32′N 41°40′E
- Country: Russia
- Region: Vologda Oblast
- District: Verkhovazhsky District
- Time zone: UTC+3:00

Kudrino (Russian: Кудрино) is a rural locality (a village) in Chushevitskoye Rural Settlement, Verkhovazhsky District, Vologda Oblast, Russia. The population was 5 as of 2002.

== Geography ==
Kudrino is located 38 km southwest of Verkhovazhye (the district's administrative centre) by road. Novaya Derevnya is the nearest rural locality.
