= Krasny, Oktyabrskoye Rural Settlement, Bobrovsky District, Voronezh Oblast =

Krasny Красный
- Settlement
- Location within Voronezh Oblast Location within Russia
- Coordinates: 50°54′N 40°13′E
- Country: Russia
- Region: Voronezh Oblast
- District: Bobrovsky District
- Time zone: UTC+3:00

Krasny (Russian: Красный) is a rural locality (a settlement) and the administrative center of Oktyabrvskoye Rural Settlement, Bobrovsky District, Voronezh Oblast, Russia. The population was 417 as of 2010. Morozovka is the nearest rural locality.
