= Krasnoye, Alexeyevsky District, Belgorod Oblast =

Krasnoye Красное
- Selo
- Location within Belgorod Oblast Location within Russia
- Coordinates: 50°20′N 38°48′E
- Country: Russia
- Region: Belgorod Oblast
- District: Alexeyevsky District
- Time zone: UTC+3:00

Krasnoye (Russian: Красное) is a rural locality (a selo) and the administrative center of Krasnenskoye Rural Settlement, Alexeyevsky District, Belgorod Oblast, Russia. The population was 904 as of 2010. There are five streets.
