= Krasny, Uryupinsky District, Volgograd Oblast =

Krasny Красный
- Khutor
- Location within Volgograd Oblast Location within Russia
- Coordinates: 50°48′N 42°16′E
- Country: Russia
- Region: Volgograd Oblast
- District: Uryupinsky District
- Time zone: UTC+4:00

Krasny (Russian: Красный) is a rural locality (a khutor) in and the administrative center of Krasnyanskoye Rural Settlement, Uryupinsky District, Volgograd Oblast, Russia. The population was 416 as of 2010. There are 10 streets.

== Geography ==
Krasny is located in steppe, 22 km east of Uryupinsk (the district's administrative centre) by road. Kukhtinsky is the nearest rural locality.
