= Krasny, Danilovsky District, Volgograd Oblast =

Krasny Красный
- Khutor
- Location within Volgograd Oblast Location within Russia
- Coordinates: 50°20′N 44°08′E
- Country: Russia
- Region: Volgograd Oblast
- District: Danilovsky District
- Time zone: UTC+4:00

Krasny (Russian: Красный) is a rural locality (a khutor) and the administrative center of Krasninskoye Rural Settlement, Danilovsky District, Volgograd Oblast, Russia. The population was 590 in 2010. There are ten streets.

== Geography ==
Krasny is located in forest steppe, on the left bank of the Medveditsa River, 18 km southeast of Danilovka (the district's administrative centre) by road. Danilovka is the nearest rural locality.
