= Krasnoye, Amur Oblast =

Krasnoye Красное
- Selo
- Location within Amur Oblast Location within Russia
- Coordinates: 49°59′N 127°30′E
- Country: Russia
- Region: Amur Oblast
- District: Tambovsky District
- Time zone: UTC+9:00

Krasnoye (Russian: Красное) is a rural locality (a selo) and the administrative center of Krasnensky Selsoviet of Tambovsky District, Amur Oblast, Russia. The population was 249 as of 2018. There are 6 streets.

== Geography ==
Krasnoye is located on the Amur River, 47 km west of Tambovka (the district's administrative centre) by road. Kuropatino is the nearest rural locality.
