= Krasny, Talovsky District, Voronezh Oblast =

Krasny Красный
- Settlement
- Location within Voronezh Oblast Location within Russia
- Coordinates: 51°13′N 40°45′E
- Country: Russia
- Region: Voronezh Oblast
- District: Talovsky District
- Time zone: UTC+3:00

Krasny (Russian: Красный) is a rural locality (a settlement) in Alexandrovskoye Rural Settlement, Talovsky District, Voronezh Oblast, Russia. The population was 277 as of 2010. There are 2 streets.

== Geography ==
The settlement is located in the north-east of the central part of the Voronezh region, in the forest-steppe zone, at a distance of approximately 10 kilometers (in a straight line) to the north-northeast (NNE) from the workers' settlement of Talovaya, the administrative center of the district. The absolute height is 156 meters above sea level.

Krasny, like the entire Voronezh Oblast, is located in the Moscow Time Zone. The offset of the applied time relative to UTC is +3:00.
