= Krasnoye, Novokhopyorsky District, Voronezh Oblast =

Krasnoye Красное
- Selo
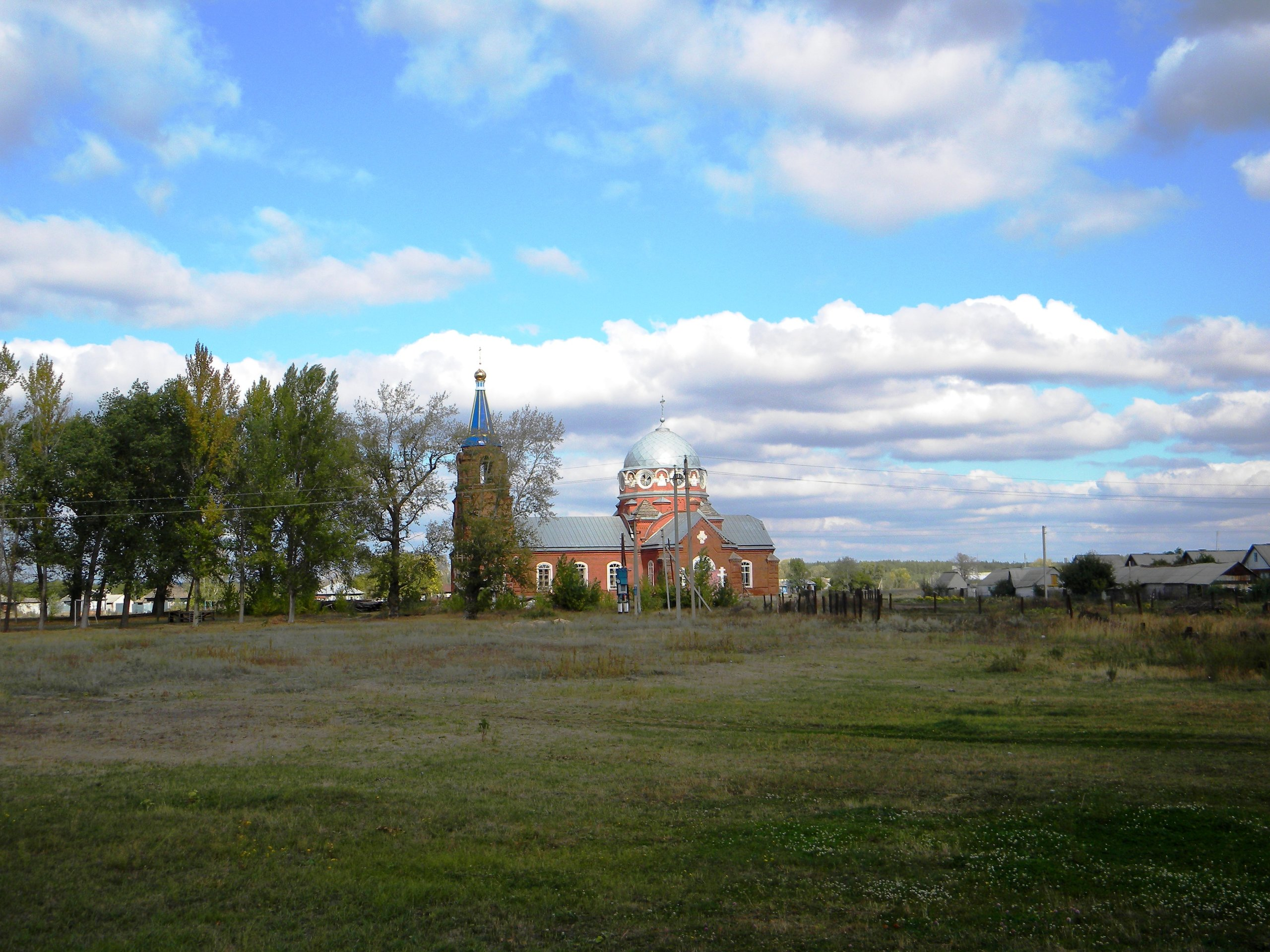

- Location within Voronezh Oblast Location within Russia
- Coordinates: 51°10′N 41°28′E
- Country: Russia
- Region: Voronezh Oblast
- District: Novokhopyorsky District
- Time zone: UTC+3:00

Krasnoye (Russian: Кра́сное) is a rural locality (a selo) and the administrative center of Krasnyanskoye Rural Settlement, Novokhopyorsky District, Voronezh Oblast, Russia. The population was 2,490 as of 2010. There are 16 streets.

== Geography ==
Krasnoye is located 15 km northwest of Novokhopyorsk (the district's administrative centre) by road. Nekrylovo is the nearest rural locality.
