= Krasnoye, Paninsky District, Voronezh Oblast =

Krasnoye Красное
- Selo
- Location within Voronezh Oblast Location within Russia
- Coordinates: 51°44′N 40°12′E
- Country: Russia
- Region: Voronezh Oblast
- District: Paninsky District
- Time zone: UTC+3:00

Krasnoye (Russian: Красное) is a rural locality (a selo) in Krasnenskoye Rural Settlement, Paninsky District, Voronezh Oblast, Russia. The population was 248 as of 2010. There are 2 streets.

== Geography ==
Krasnoye is located 16 km northeast of Panino (the district's administrative centre) by road. Perelyoshino is the nearest rural locality.
