= Krasnoye, Medvensky District, Kursk Oblast =

Rural locality in Kursk Oblast, Russia

Krasnoye Красное
- Khutor
- Interactive map of Krasnoye
- Location of Krasnoye Krasnoye (Kursk Oblast)
- Coordinates: 51°28′11″N 36°18′55″E
- Country: Russia
- Federal subject: Kursk Oblast
- Administrative district: Medvensky District
- SelsovietSelsoviet: Kitayevsky

Population (2010 Census)
  - Total: 7
  - Estimate (2010): 7 (0%)

Municipal status
  - Municipal district: Medvensky Municipal District
  - Rural settlement: Kitayevsky Selsoviet Rural Settlement
- Time zone: UTC+3 (MSK)
- Postal code: 307052
- Dialing code: +7 47146
- OKTMO ID: 38624424186
- Website: kitayss.rkursk.ru

Krasnoye (Russian: Красное) is a rural locality (a khutor) in Kitayevsky Selsoviet Rural Settlement, Medvensky District, Kursk Oblast, Russia. Population: 7 (2010 census); 15 (2002 census);

== Geography ==
The khutor is located on the Polnaya River (a left tributary of the Seym), 79 km (49 mi) from the Russia–Ukraine border, 28 km (17 mi) south-east of Kursk, 13.5 km (8.4 mi) north-east of the district center – the urban-type settlement Medvenka, 2.5 km (1.6 mi) from the selsoviet center – 2nd Kitayevka.

Climate

Krasnoye has a warm-summer humid continental climate (Dfb in the Köppen climate classification).

== Transport ==
Krasnoye is located 13 km (8.1 mi) from the federal route M-2 Crimea Highway (a part of the European route E105), 7.5 km (4.7 mi) from the road of intermunicipal significance 38H-236 (M2 "Crimea Highway" – Polevaya), on the road 38H-237 (M2 "Crimea Highway" – Polny – 38N-236), 20 km (12 mi) from the nearest railway halt Kolodnoye (railway line Klyukva — Belgorod).

The rural locality is situated 31 km (19 mi) from Kursk Vostochny Airport, 93 km (58 mi) from Belgorod International Airport and 205 km (127 mi) from Voronezh Peter the Great Airport.
