= Lake Krasnoye =

Lake Krasnoye (Russian: Красное озеро, literally “Red Lake”) may refer to:

- Lake Krasnoye (Leningrad Oblast), a lake in the central part of the Karelian Isthmus, in Leningrad Oblast, Russia
- Lake Krasnoye (Chukotka), a lake in Chukotka Autonomous Okrug, Russia

== See also ==
- Lake Gołdap, a lake divided between Poland's Gołdap County and Russia's Kaliningrad Oblast, which is also named “Krasnoye” in Russian
