= Krasnoye, Sheksninsky District, Vologda Oblast =

Krasnoye Красное
- Village
- Location within Vologda Oblast Location within Russia
- Coordinates: 59°10′N 38°22′E
- Country: Russia
- Region: Vologda Oblast
- District: Sheksninsky District
- Time zone: UTC+3:00

Krasnoye (Russian: Красное) is a rural locality (a village) in Zheleznodorozhnoye Rural Settlement, Sheksninsky District, Vologda Oblast, Russia. The population was 3 as of 2002.

== Geography ==
Krasnoye is located 15 km southwest of Sheksna (the district's administrative centre) by road. Gari is the nearest rural locality.
