= Krasnoye, Prokhorovsky District, Belgorod Oblast =

Krasnoye Красное
- Selo
- Location within Belgorod Oblast Location within Russia
- Coordinates: 51°00′N 36°48′E
- Country: Russia
- Region: Belgorod Oblast
- District: Prokhorovsky District
- Time zone: UTC+3:00

Krasnoye (Russian: Красное) is a rural locality (a selo) in Prokhorovsky District, Belgorod Oblast, Russia. The population was 111 as of 2010. There are 3 streets.

== Geography ==
Krasnoye is located 11 km southeast of Prokhorovka (the district's administrative centre) by road. Zelyony is the nearest rural locality.
