= Kudrino, Alexandrovsky District, Vladimir Oblast =

Kudrino Кудрино
- Village
- Location within Vladimir Oblast Location within Russia
- Coordinates: 56°22′N 39°03′E
- Country: Russia
- Region: Vladimir Oblast
- District: Alexandrovsky District
- Time zone: UTC+3:00

Kudrino (Russian: Кудрино) is a rural locality (a village) in Andreyevskoye Rural Settlement, Alexandrovsky District, Vladimir Oblast, Russia. The population was 1 as of 2010.

== Geography ==
Kudrino is located 27 km east of Alexandrov (the district's administrative centre) by road. Novosyolka is the nearest rural locality.
