= Krasny, Sredneakhtubinsky District, Volgograd Oblast =

Krasny Красный
- Settlement
- Location within Volgograd Oblast Location within Russia
- Coordinates: 48°38′N 44°48′E
- Country: Russia
- Region: Volgograd Oblast
- District: Sredneakhtubinsky District
- Time zone: UTC+4:00

Krasny (Russian: Красный) is a rural locality (a settlement) in Kuybyshevskoye Rural Settlement, Sredneakhtubinsky District, Volgograd Oblast, Russia. The population was 67 as of 2010. There are 14 streets.

== Geography ==
Krasny is located 13 km southwest of Srednyaya Akhtuba (the district's administrative centre) by road. Nevidimka is the nearest rural locality.
