= Krasnı Xutor =

- Location within Azerbaijan
- Coordinates: 41°34′06″N 48°48′11″E
- Country: Azerbaijan
- Rayon: Khachmaz
- Municipality: Yataqoba
- Time zone: UTC+4 (AZT)
  - Summer (DST): UTC+5 (AZT)

Krasnı Xutor (also, Krasnyy Khutor) is a village in the Khachmaz Rayon of Azerbaijan. The village forms part of the municipality of Yataqoba.
