= Krasny, Chernyshkovsky District, Volgograd Oblast =

Krasny Красный
- Settlement
- Location within Volgograd Oblast Location within Russia
- Coordinates: 48°23′N 42°21′E
- Country: Russia
- Region: Volgograd Oblast
- District: Chernyshkovsky District

Population
  - Total: 123
- Time zone: UTC+4:00

Krasny (Russian: Красный) is a rural locality (a settlement) in Krasnoyarskoye Rural Settlement, Chernyshkovsky District, Volgograd Oblast, Russia. The population was 123 as of 2010. There are 4 streets.

== Geography ==
Krasny is located 11 km southeast of Chernyshkovsky (the district's administrative centre) by road. Bogomazovka is the nearest rural locality.
