= Yuri Krasny =

Soviet and Ukrainian teacher, artist, writer

Yuri Krasny (Russian: Красный Юрий Евсеевич, born 1946 in Dnipropetrovsk, Ukraine) is a Ukrainian media education theorists.

== Early life ==
In his childhood, Yuri suffered from rheumatism.

In 1974, he graduated from Dnipropetrovsk Transport Engineering Institute; investing time in self-education in humanities while living an artistic dissident's life.

He married Lina Kurdyukova. Upon discovery of amateur filmmaking, they worked in the Dnipropetrovsk animation studio Vesnyanka ("Веснянка", later upgraded to cinemacenter status), from 1980-1984. In 1984 they organized ECOANIMA, a children studio for ecology and animation in Dnipropetrovsk. In 1986 with Mariya Krasny they founded SIMHAH Center for children and youth creative development at Dnipropetrovsk Jewish Community Center. In 1999 he began developing and conducting classes for children with cerebral palsy at Dnipropetrovsk resource center. Krasny is an ASIFA member and participates in various UNICEF projects. In 1999 he developed the application of animation pedagogy for children with special needs.

In 2006, the couple migrated to Israel.

== Аnimation pedagogy ==
Conceptualization of education by means of animation began in 1983, during the Annecy Festival, at an ASIFA seminar titled Animated Film at School - Tomorrow's Pedagogy?. It opened a series of international workshops for children, taking place around the world on a regular basis. The stated goals were:

- popularization of animation making among the children
- exposure of the animation made by children to a broad audience

While addressing this event in his book animation pedagogy (which he co-authored with his spouse), Krasny emphasized that animation has value as a medium for teaching special subjects at school and as a means of universal aesthetic development for children and youth of any age group.

It claimed that animation is uniquely close to children's gaming psychology and, depending on personal interest, it exposes them to many kinds of human activities, thus facilitating future identification. Teaching animation exposes them to graphics, painting, sculpting, drama, literature, crafts, and media literacy; exploring camera work and editing expose the pupils to the best of cinema culture and helps them develop a critical attitude towards commercial media production.

A 6 component theory (word, line, color, volume, movement, sound) was formulated, corresponding to the main stages of filmmaking. The children are provided grounds for individual and group work, socialization at animation festivals, in correspondence with the three age groups.

Successful in the 80s (festivals, seminars for the educationalists from the Soviet republics, cooperation with the children workshops in Russia, Estonia, Georgia etc.), animation pedagogy school in Dnipropetrovsk developed as an amateur alternative to the official Soviet school system. After the Soviet Union collapsed (1991), it continued developing with support of several charitable funds.

Development of home video and simplification of digital editing allowed for application of animation pedagogy methods directly at home. Recently Y. and L. Krasny have been preoccupied with online tutorials for young families.

== Special needs children ==
About approaches to work with "special" children and the experience of such work Y. Krasny stated:

"The book describes the experimental teaching of art to children having cerebral palsy and other special needs in the area of psycho physical development that took place during many years. The author attempts to exceed the boundaries of specifically therapeutic objectives as well as to substantiate the potential social value of children having cerebral palsy that is connected with the peculiarities of their creativity. A substantial part of the book is dedicated to a detailed presentation of the techniques and forms of creative classes with children having cerebral palsy and the usage of different materials and methods. The unique feature of the method is addressing animation creativity as a means of rehabilitation and social adaptation of children having cerebral palsy. Working at an animated film creates unique conditions for organizing cooperation between children with cerebral palsy and healthy children"

== Works ==
- Art is Always a Therapy
