= Krasnoye, Suzdalsky District, Vladimir Oblast =

Krasnoye Красное
- Selo
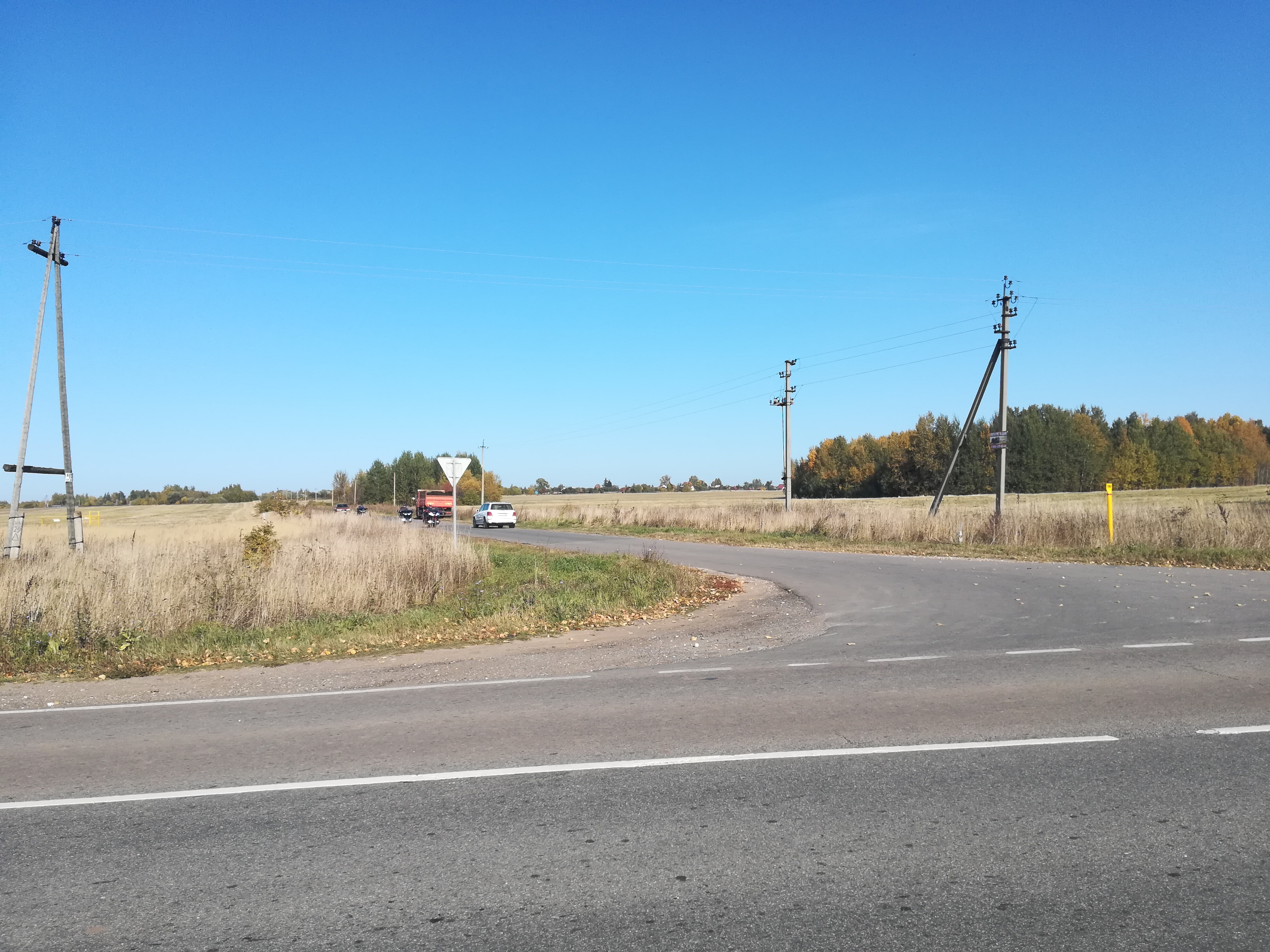
- Vladimir District 20200927 110053.jpg

- Location within Vladimir Oblast Location within Russia
- Coordinates: 56°25′N 40°29′E
- Country: Russia
- Region: Vladimir Oblast
- District: Suzdalsky District
- Time zone: UTC+3:00

Krasnoye (Russian: Красное) is a rural locality (a selo) in Seletskoye Rural Settlement, Suzdalsky District, Vladimir Oblast, Russia. The population was 82 as of 2010. There are 7 streets.

== Geography ==
Krasnoye is located on the Nerl River, 5 km east of Suzdal (the district's administrative centre) by road. Troitsa-Bereg is the nearest rural locality.
