= Krasnoye, Palekhsky District, Ivanovo Oblast =

Krasnoye Красное
- Village
- Location within Ivanovo Oblast Location within Russia
- Coordinates: 56°49′N 41°48′E
- Country: Russia
- Region: Ivanovo Oblast
- District: Palekhsky District
- Time zone: UTC+3:00

Church of the Theotokos of the Sign, Krasnoye, Ivanovo Oblast

Krasnoye (Russian: Красное) is a rural locality (a selo) in Palekhsky District, Ivanovo Oblast, Russia. Population: 200 (2010 census);

== Geography ==
This rural locality is located 4 kilometres (2.5 mi) from Palekh (the district's administrative centre), 55 kilometres (34 mi) from Ivanovo (capital of Ivanovo Oblast) and 282 kilometres (175 mi) from Moscow. Dyagilevo is the nearest rural locality.
