= Kudrino, Nikolsky District, Vologda Oblast =

Kudrino Кудрино
- Village
- Location within Vologda Oblast Location within Russia
- Coordinates: 59°43′N 45°29′E
- Country: Russia
- Region: Vologda Oblast
- District: Nikolsky District
- Time zone: UTC+3:00

Kudrino (Russian: Кудрино) is a rural locality (a village) in Baydarovskoye Rural Settlement, Nikolsky District, Vologda Oblast, Russia. The population was 62 as of 2002.

== Geography ==
Kudrino is located 25 km northeast of Nikolsk (the district's administrative centre) by road. Pelyaginets is the nearest rural locality.

== Paleontology ==
Fossils of temnospondyls from the Early Triassic are known from Kudrino. Specimens of Benthosuchus sushkini and Tupilakosaurus sp. were found in the Lower Olenekian deposits.
