= Krasnoye, Ramonsky District, Voronezh Oblast =

Krasnoye Красное
- Khutor
- Location within Voronezh Oblast Location within Russia
- Coordinates: 51°55′N 39°15′E
- Country: Russia
- Region: Voronezh Oblast
- District: Ramonsky District
- Time zone: UTC+3:00

Krasnoye (Russian: Красное) is a rural locality (a khutor) in Aydarovskoye Rural Settlement, Ramonsky District, Voronezh Oblast, Russia. The population was 467 as of 2010. There are 5 streets.

== Geography ==
Krasnoye is located 7 km northwest of Ramon (the district's administrative centre) by road. Bogdanovo is the nearest rural locality.
