= Kudrino, Kirzhachsky District, Vladimir Oblast =

Kudrino Кудрино
- Village
- Location within Vladimir Oblast Location within Russia
- Coordinates: 56°16′N 39°03′E
- Country: Russia
- Region: Vladimir Oblast
- District: Kirzhachsky District
- Time zone: UTC+3:00

Kudrino (Russian: Кудрино) is a rural locality (a village) in Kiprevskoye Rural Settlement, Kirzhachsky District, Vladimir Oblast, Russia. The population was 10 as of 2010. There is 1 street.

== Geography ==
Kudrino is located 24 km northeast of Kirzhach (the district's administrative centre) by road. Afanasovo is the nearest rural locality.
