= Krasnoye, Perm Krai =

Krasnoye Красное
- Settlement
- Location within Perm Krai Location within Russia
- Coordinates: 58°53′N 56°37′E
- Country: Russia
- Region: Perm Krai
- District: Dobryansky District
- Time zone: UTC+5:00

Krasnoye (Russian: Красное) is a rural locality (a settlement) in Dobryansky District, Perm Krai, Russia. The population was 36 as of 2010. There are 4 streets.
