= Kachpur Union =

Union in Dhaka Division, Bangladesh

- Union
- Location in Bangladesh
- Country: Bangladesh
- Division: Dhaka Division
- District: Narayanganj District
- Upazilas: Sonargaon Upazila

Area
  - Total: 12.5 km^{2} (4.8 sq mi)

Population (2001)
  - Total: 35,947
- Time zone: UTC+6 (BST)

Kachpur Union is a union, the smallest administrative body of Bangladesh, located in Sonargaon Upazila, Narayanganj District, Bangladesh. The total population is 35,947.
