= Krasnoye, Yuryev-Polsky District, Vladimir Oblast =

Krasnoye Красное
- Selo
- Location within Vladimir Oblast Location within Russia
- Coordinates: 56°31′N 39°40′E
- Country: Russia
- Region: Vladimir Oblast
- District: Yuryev-Polsky District
- Time zone: UTC+3:00

Krasnoye (Russian: Красное) is a rural locality (a selo) and the administrative center of Krasnoselskoye Rural Settlement, Yuryev-Polsky District, Vladimir Oblast, Russia. The population was 605 as of 2010.

== Geography ==
Krasnoye is located 4 km north of Yuryev-Polsky (the district's administrative centre) by road. Yuryev-Polsky is the nearest rural locality.
