= Krasny Khutor (Belgorod Oblast) =

Krasny Khutor Красный Хутор
- Selo
- Location within Belgorod Oblast Location within Russia
- Coordinates: 50°22′N 36°35′E
- Country: Russia
- Region: Belgorod Oblast
- District: Belgorodsky District
- Time zone: UTC+3:00

Krasny Khutor (Russian: Красный Хутор) is a rural locality (a selo) in Belgorodsky District, Belgorod Oblast, Russia. The population was 554 as of 2010. There are 5 streets.

== Geography ==
Krasny Khutor is located 30 km southwest of Maysky (the district's administrative centre) by road. Novaya Naumovka is the nearest rural locality.
