= Kudrino, Vologodsky District, Vologda Oblast =

Kudrino Кудрино
- Village
- Location within Vologda Oblast Location within Russia
- Coordinates: 59°08′N 39°49′E
- Country: Russia
- Region: Vologda Oblast
- District: Vologodsky District
- Time zone: UTC+3:00

Kudrino (Russian: Кудрино) is a rural locality (a village) in Spasskoye Rural Settlement, Vologodsky District, Vologda Oblast, Russia. The population was 11 as of 2002. There are 6 streets.

== Geography ==
Kudrino is located 12 km southwest of Vologda (the district's administrative centre) by road. Nepotyagovo is the nearest rural locality.
