= Krasny, Yelansky District, Volgograd Oblast =

Krasny Красный
- Settlement
- Location within Volgograd Oblast Location within Russia
- Coordinates: 50°55′N 43°40′E
- Country: Russia
- Region: Volgograd Oblast
- District: Yelansky District
- Time zone: UTC+4:00

Krasny (Russian: Красный) is a rural locality (a settlement) in Yelanskoye Urban Settlement, Yelansky District, Volgograd Oblast, Russia. The population was 128 as of 2010. There are 2 streets.

== Geography ==
Krasny is located on Khopyorsko-Buzulukskaya Plain, on the right bank of the Yelan River, 7 km southwest of Yelan (the district's administrative centre) by road. Yelan is the nearest rural locality.
