= Krasnoye, Gryazovetsky District, Vologda Oblast =

Krasnoye Красное
- Village
- Location within Vologda Oblast Location within Russia
- Coordinates: 58°54′N 40°48′E
- Country: Russia
- Region: Vologda Oblast
- District: Gryazovetsky District
- Time zone: UTC+3:00

Krasnoye (Russian: Красное) is a rural locality (a village) in Sidorovskoye Rural Settlement, Gryazovetsky District, Vologda Oblast, Russia. The population was 17 as of 2002.

== Geography ==
Krasnoye is located 42 km (26 mi) east of Gryazovets (the district's administrative centre) by road. Klobukino is the nearest rural locality.
