= Krasnoye, Kizlyarsky District, Republic of Dagestan =

Krasnoye Красное
- Selo
- Location within Republic of Dagestan Location within Russia
- Coordinates: 44°06′N 46°52′E
- Country: Russia
- Region: Republic of Dagestan
- District: Kizlyarsky District
- Time zone: UTC+3:00

Krasnoye (Russian: Красное) is a rural locality (a selo) in Bolsheareshevsky Selsoviet, Kizlyarsky District, Republic of Dagestan, Russia. The population was 91 as of 2010. There is 1 street.

== Geography ==
It is located 30 km northeast of Kizlyar, 5 km southwest of Bolshaya Areshevka.

== Nationalities ==
Dargins live there.
