= Kudrino, Arkhangelsk Oblast =

Kudrino Кудрино
- Village
- Location within Arkhangelsk Oblast Location within Russia
- Coordinates: 61°04′N 46°36′E
- Country: Russia
- Region: Arkhangelsk Oblast
- District: Kotlassky District
- Time zone: UTC+3:00

Kudrino (Russian: Кудрино) is a rural locality (a village) in Cheryomushskoye Rural Settlement of Kotlassky District, Arkhangelsk Oblast, Russia. The population was 1 as of 2010.

== Geography ==
Kudrino is located 23 km south of Kotlas (the district's administrative centre) by road. Varavino is the nearest rural locality.
