= Krasnoye, Trubchevsky District, Bryansk Oblast =

Krasnoye Красное
- Village
- Location within Bryansk Oblast Location within Russia
- Coordinates: 52°33′N 33°41′E
- Country: Russia
- Region: Bryansk Oblast
- District: Trubchevsky District
- Time zone: UTC+3:00

Krasnoye (Russian: Красное) is a rural locality (a village) in Trubchevsky District, Bryansk Oblast, Russia. The population was 737 as of 2010. There are 15 streets.

== Geography ==
Krasnoye is located 5 km southwest of Trubchevsk (the district's administrative centre) by road. Makarzno is the nearest rural locality.
