= Krasnoye, Krasninsky District, Smolensk Oblast =

Rural locality in Smolensk Oblast, Russia

Krasnoye Красное
- Selo
- Interactive map of Krasnoye
- Location of Krasnoye Krasnoye (Smolensk Oblast)
- Coordinates: 54°40′55″N 31°2′18″E
- Country: Russia
- Federal subject: Smolensk Oblast
- Administrative district: Krasninsky District

Population (2010 Census)
  - Total: 144
- Time zone: UTC+3 (MSK)
- Postal code: 216100
- Dialing code: +7 48145
- OKTMO ID: 66624435216

Krasnoye (Russian: Красное) is a rural locality (a selo) in the Krasninsky District in the Smolensk Oblast of Russia in Eastern Europe. Population: 144 (2010 census); 202 (2002 census);
