= Volodarsky, Astrakhan Oblast =

Rural locality in Astrakhan Oblast, Russia

Volodarsky Russian: Володарский
- settlement
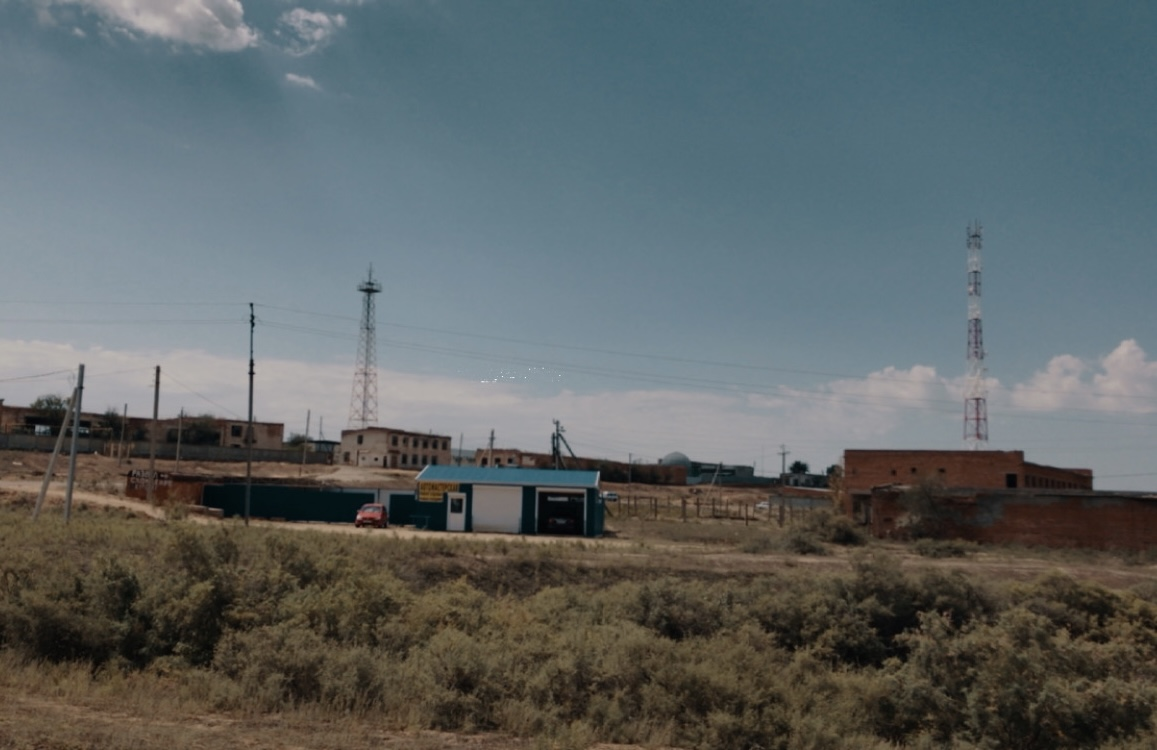
- Interactive map of Volodarsky
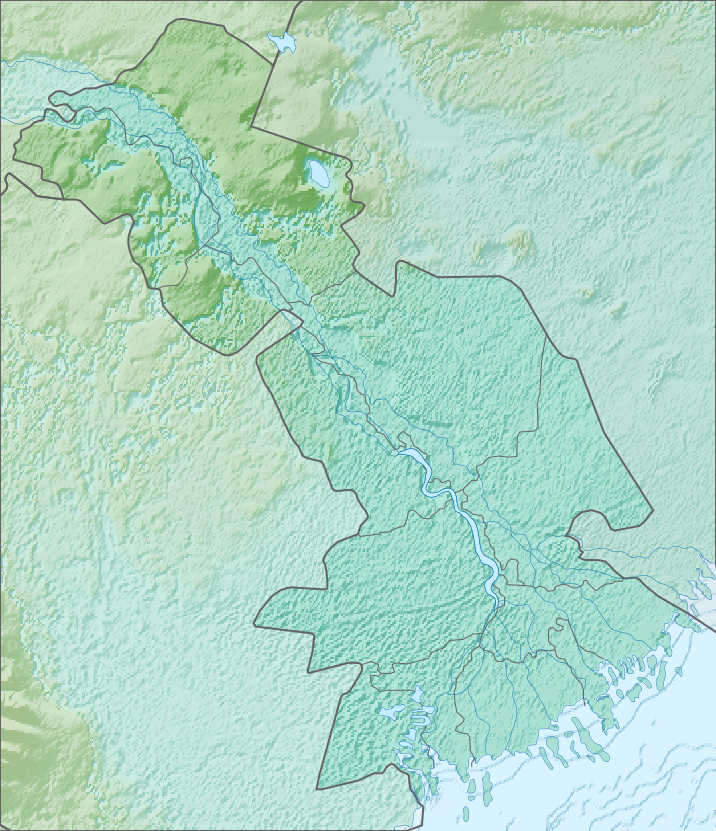
- Location within Astrakhan Oblast Location within Russia
- Coordinates: 46°23′53″N 48°32′24″E
- Country: Russia
- Region: Astrakhan Oblast
- District: Volodarsky District
- Time zone: UTC+4:00

Volodarsky (Russian: Волода́рский; Kazakh: Володар, Volodar) is a rural locality (a settlement) and the administrative center of Volodarsky District of Astrakhan Oblast, Russia.

== Demographics ==
Population: 10,005 (2010 census); 9,553 (2002 census); 9,326 (1989 Soviet census).
