= Volodarsky District, Astrakhan Oblast =

Volodarsky District Володарский район (Russian)
- District
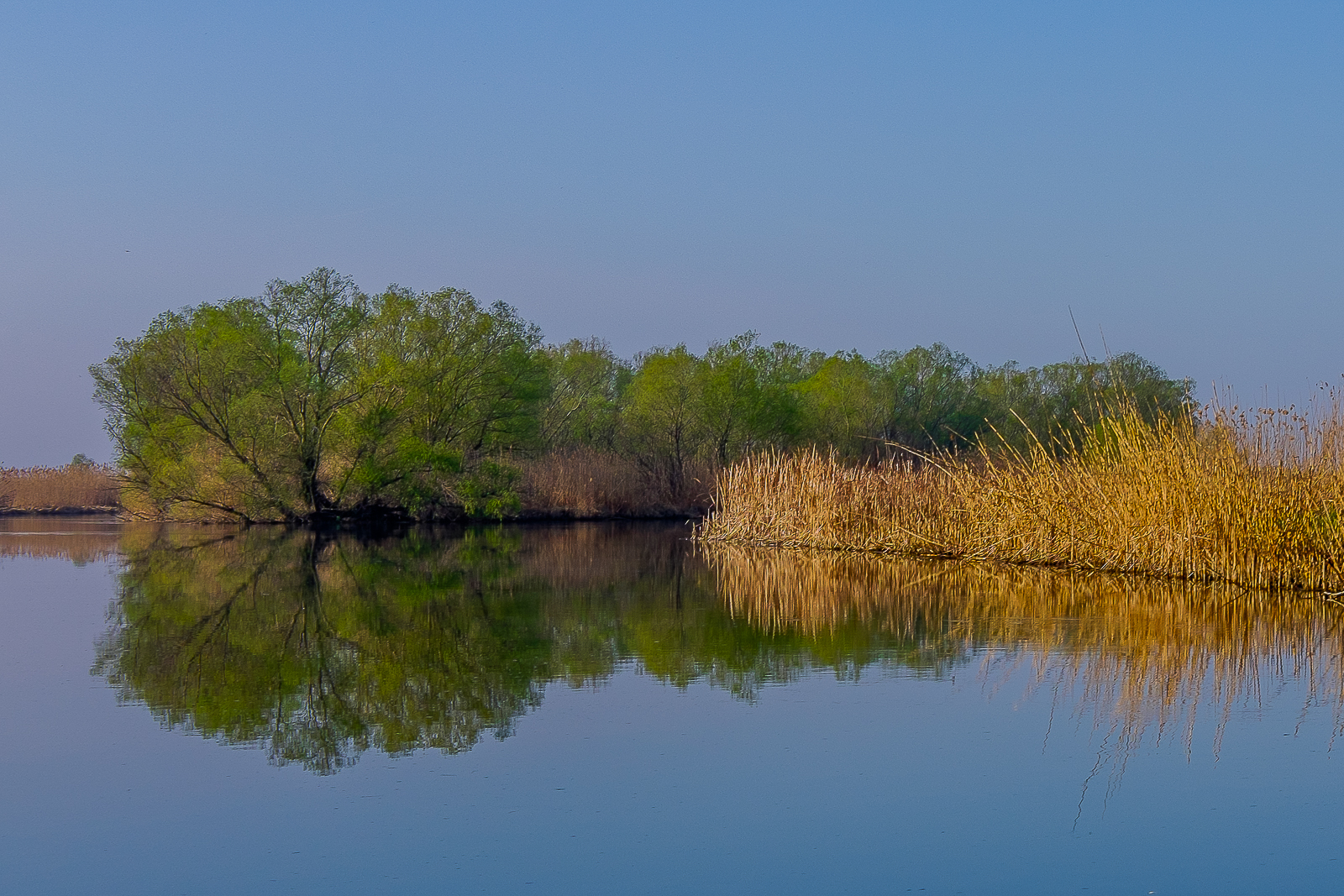
- Astrakan Reserve, Vodolarsky District

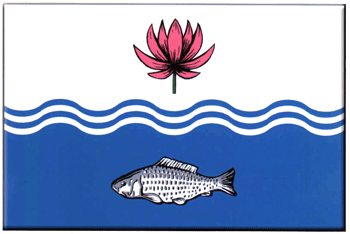
- Flag Coat of arms
- Astrakhanskaya oblast Volodarskiy rayon.svg
- Coordinates: 46°24′01″N 48°31′52″E
- Country: Russia
- Federal subject: Astrakhan Oblast
- Established: 1931
- Administrative center: Volodarsky

Area
  - Total: 3,883 km^{2} (1,499 sq mi)

Population (2010 Census)
  - Total: 47,825
  - Density: 12.32/km^{2} (31.90/sq mi)
  - Urban: 0%
  - Rural: 100%

Administrative structure
  - Administrative divisions: 21 Selsoviets
  - Inhabited localities: 74 rural localities

Municipal structure
  - Municipally incorporated as: Volodarsky Municipal District
  - Municipal divisions: 0 urban settlements, 21 rural settlements
- Time zone: UTC+4 (MSK+1)
- OKTMO ID: 12610000
- Website: http://www.regionvol.ru/

Volodarsky District (Russian: Волода́рский райо́н; Kazakh: Володар ауданы, Volodar audany) is an administrative and municipal district (raion), one of the eleven in Astrakhan Oblast, Russia. It is located in the south of the oblast. The area of the district is 3,883 square kilometers (1,499 sq mi). Its administrative center is the rural locality (a settlement) of Volodarsky. Population: 47,825 (2010 census); 47,351 (2002 Census); 46,638 (1989 Soviet census). The population of the administrative center accounts for 20.9% of the district's total population.

Kazakhs are the dominant ethnic group in the district and make up around 68% of its population. Ethnic minorities include ethnic Russians (29%) and Tatars (2%).
