= AH4 =

Road in Asia

Asian Highway 4

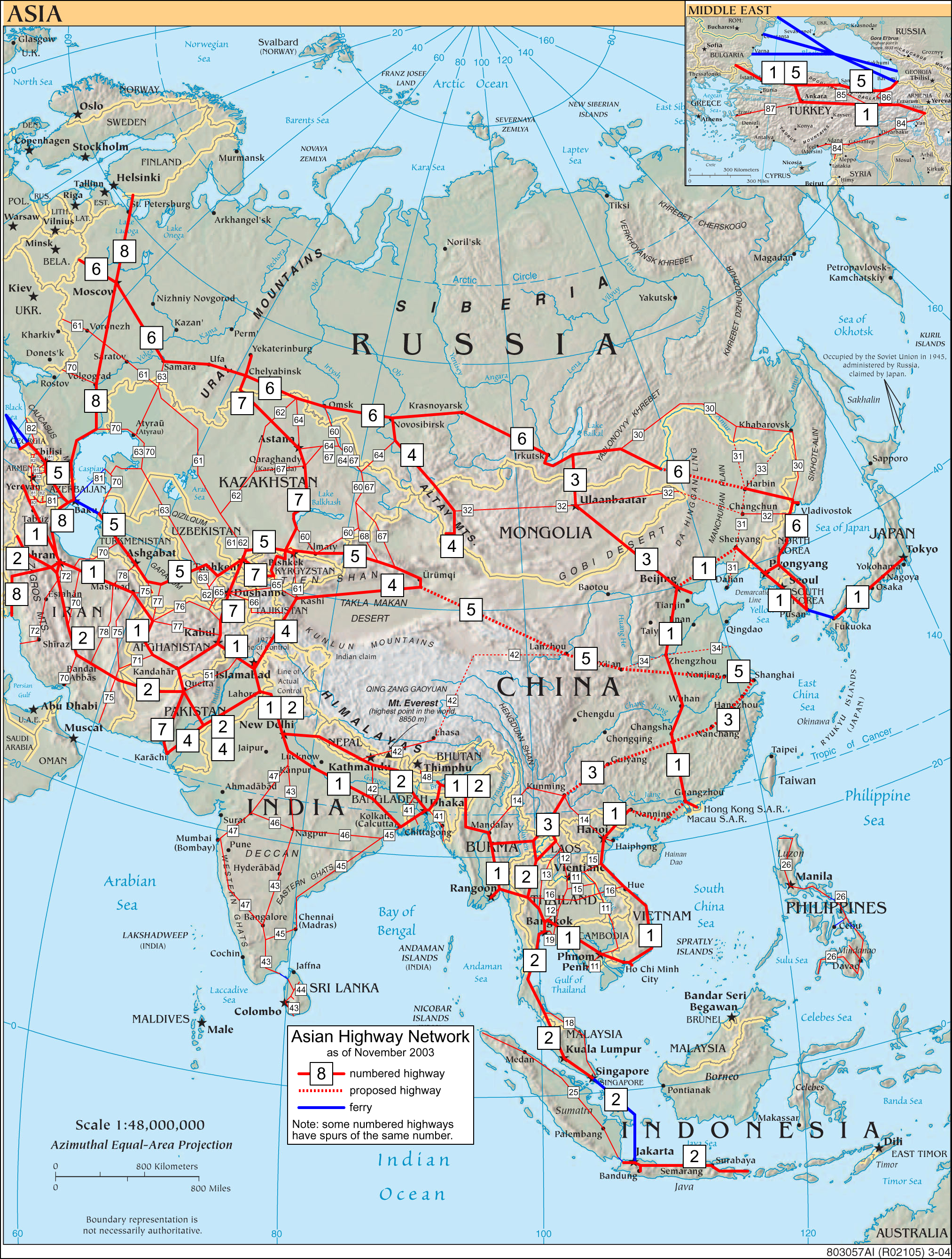

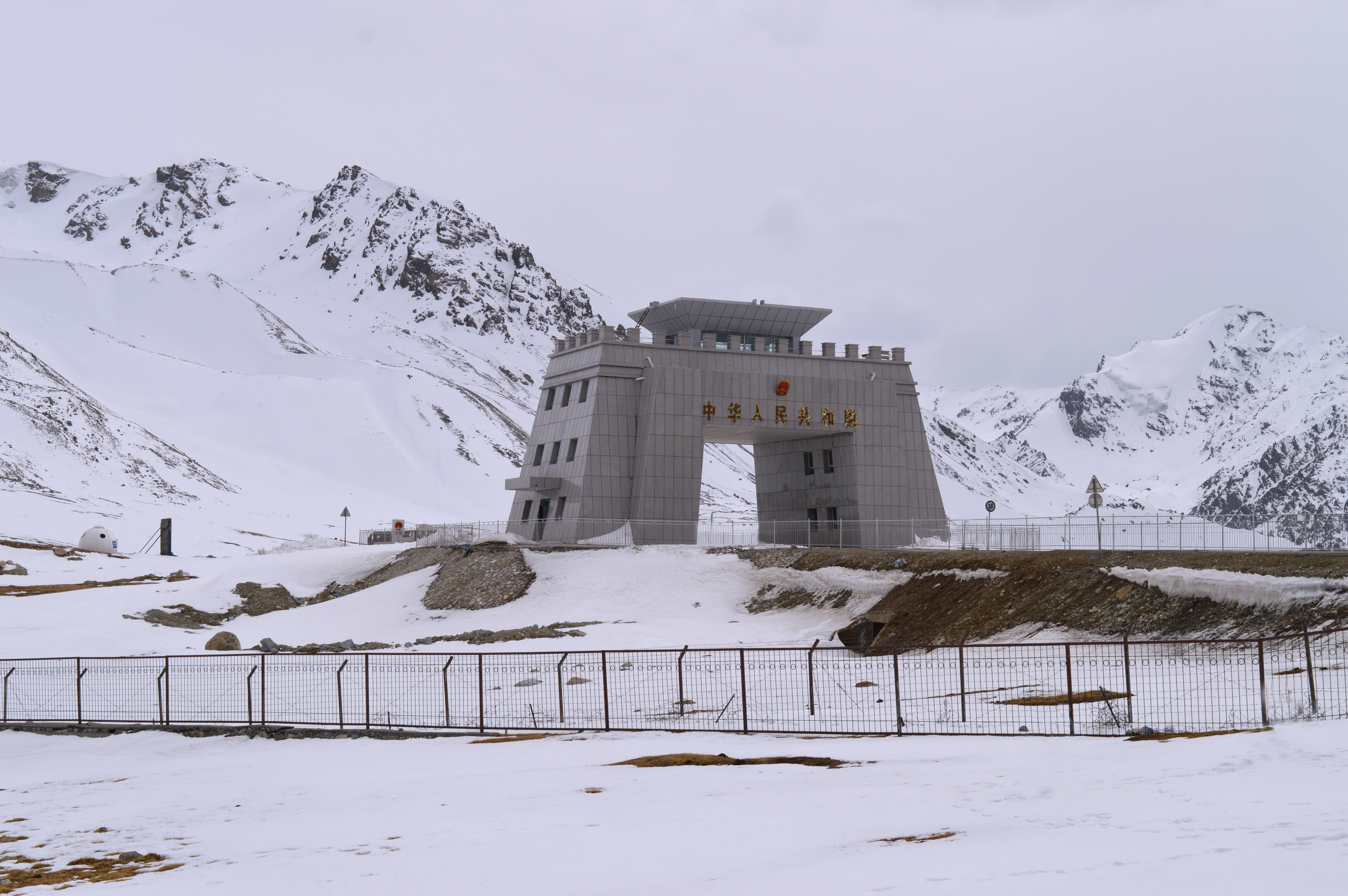
- Border Checkpoint building across AH4 near Khunjerab Pass

Major junctions
- North end: Novosibirsk, Russia
- South end: Karachi, Pakistan

Location
- Countries: Russia, Mongolia, China, Pakistan

Highway system
- Asian Highway Network
| ← AH3 | → AH5 |

Asian Highway 4 (AH4) is a route of the Asian Highway Network which runs 6,024 km (3,743 mi) from Novosibirsk, Russia (on AH6) via Ürümqi, China (on AH5) to Karachi, Pakistan (on AH7).

== Associated routes ==
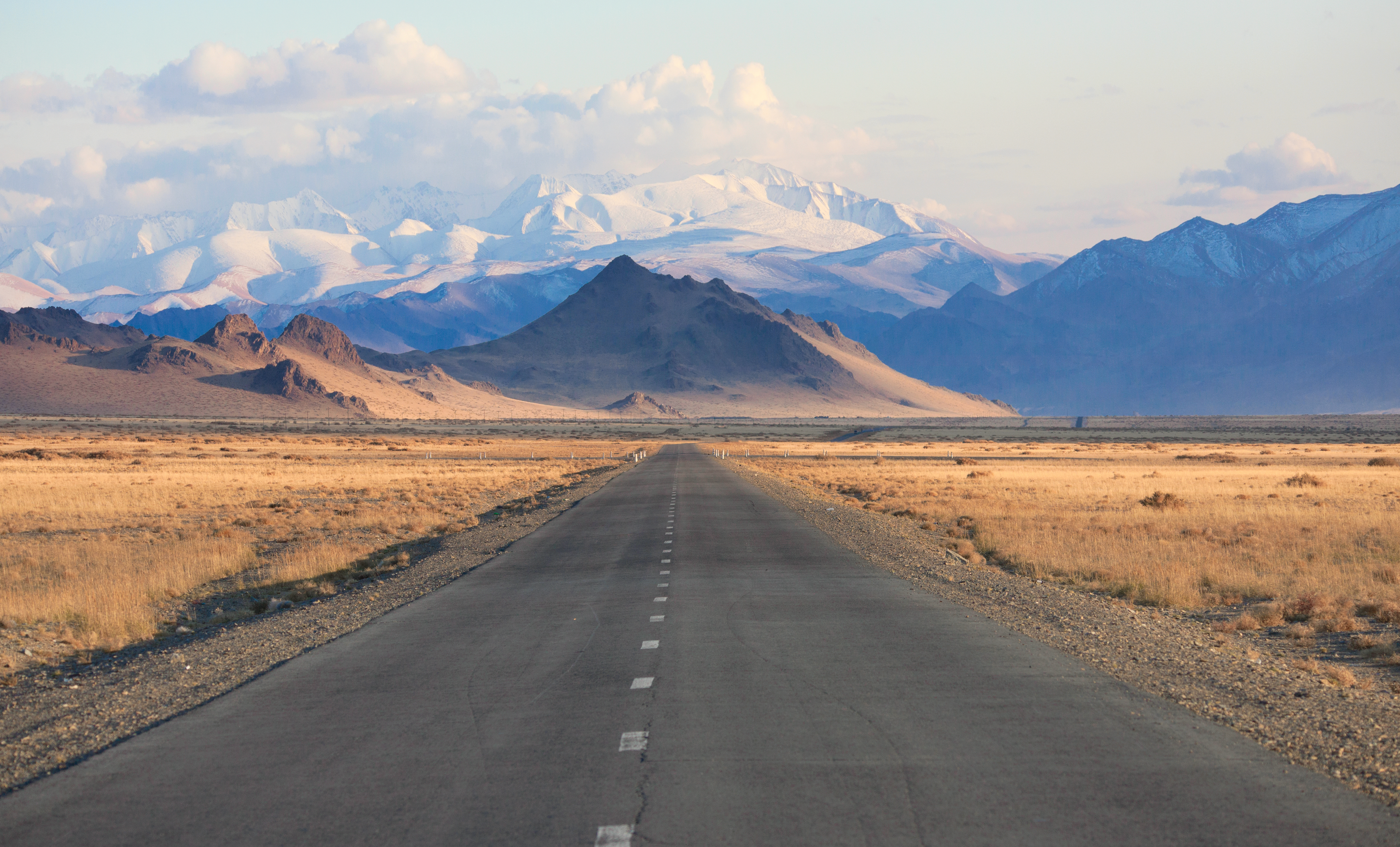
A0306 National Highway, Mongolia

=== Russia ===
- R 256: Novosibirsk (at AH6) - Biysk – Tashanta – border with Mongolia (972 km).

=== Mongolia ===
- A0306 : Border with Russia – Ulaanbaishint – Tsagaannuur – Ölgii (97 km)
- A0305 : Ölgii – Khovd (178 km)
- A0304 : Khovd – Mankhan (76 km)
- A14 : Mankhan – Yarant Port (352 km)

=== China ===
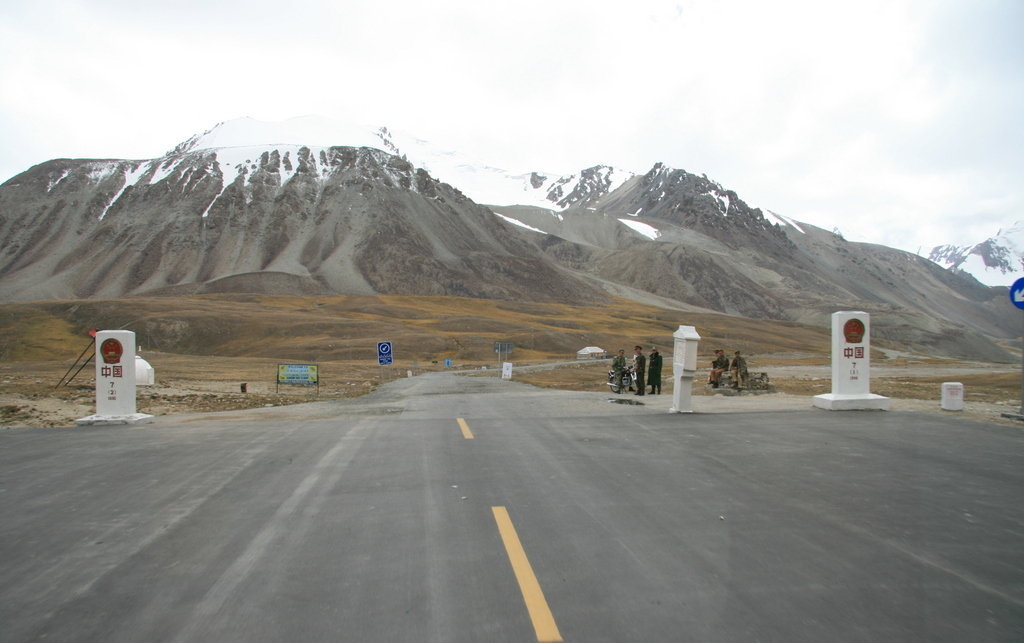
China–Pakistan border, Khunjerab Pass

- S320: Takeshkan to Fuyun, China (319 km)
- S11: Fuyun – Wucaiwan
- G7: Wucaiwan - Ürümqi
- G30: Ürümqi-Toksun
- G3012: Toksun-Kashgar
- G314: Kashgar - Tashkurgan - border to Pakistan (1948 km)
  - The border is at 4,693 metres (15,397 ft) altitude, the Khunjerab Pass

=== Pakistan ===
- Khunjerab Pass — Sust — Hasan Abdal
- Hasan Abdal — Islamabad
- Islamabad — Lahore
- Lahore — Multan — Sukkur — Karachi

== See also ==
- Asian Highway 6
- Asian Highway 30
- Karakoram Highway
- List of Asian Highways
