= China National Highway 581 =

Road in China

National Highway 581
- 581国道

Major junctions
- From: Kashgar
- To: Erkeshtam

Location
- Country: China

Highway system
- National Trunk Highway System; Primary; Auxiliary
← G580	→ G601

China National Highway 581 runs between Kashgar and Erkeshtam on the border with Kyrgyzstan. It is also known as the Sary-Tash-Ulugqat road and it was part of Asian Highway 65, superseded by the G3013 Artux–Erkeshtam Expressway.

== See also ==
- China National Highways
