= Turpan–Ürümqi–Dahuangshan Expressway =

Road in Xinjiang, China

Turpan–Ürümqi–Dahuangshan Expressway 吐鲁番–乌鲁木齐–大黄山高速公路
- %translation%
- Tuwuda Expressway 吐乌大高速公路

Route information
- Length: 283.9 km (176.4 mi)
- Existed: August 20, 1998–present

Major junctions
- South end: G30 (Xingtu Expressway) / G312 in Turpan
- G3012 (Xiaohe Expressway) / G314 in Toksun; G30 / G3001 / G312 in Ürümqi; Xinjiang S114 (Wukui Expressway) in Ürümqi
- North end: G7 / G335 (Daqi Expressway) / G216 (Wuda Expressway) in Dahuangshan, Fukang

Location
- Country: China

Highway system
- National Trunk Highway System; Primary; Auxiliary; National Highways; Transport in China

The Turpan–Ürümqi–Dahuangshan Expressway (Chinese: 吐鲁番–乌鲁木齐–大黄山高速公路), commonly referred to as the Tuwuda Expressway (Chinese: 吐乌大高速公路), is an expressway in the Chinese autonomous region of Xinjiang linking Turpan, Ürümqi, and Dahuangshan, a mountain peak in Fukang. Construction began on March 21, 1995, and the expressway opened on August 20, 1998.

The project was built with the support of a $150 million World Bank loan. Currently, the section from Turpan to Xiaocaohu, at the interchange with G3012 Turpan–Hotan Expressway in Toksun, is not built to expressway standards, with grade-separated junctions. However, an expansion project is underway to upgrade this section of expressway to expressway standards, as well as expand the remainder of the expressway from 4 to 8 lanes.

== Description ==
=== G30 section ===
The expressway begins in the city of Turpan as a continuation of the G30 Lianyungang–Khorgas Expressway (Xingxingxia–Turpan Expressway section), and travels west to Toksun, where it meets the G3012 Turpan–Hotan Expressway (Xiaocaohu–Hoxud Expressway section), which is concurrent with China National Highway 314, at the Xiaocaohu Interchange. From there, it continues northwest to Ürümqi, where it meets the G3003 Ürümqi Ring Expressway at the Wulabo interchange south of the city core. This section of the expressway is signed as part of the G30 Lianyungang–Khorgas Expressway as well as the new alignment of China National Highway 312.

=== G216 section and future G7 section ===
Past the Wulabo interchange, the expressway passes through the city centre of Ürümqi before meeting the Xinjiang S114 portion of the Ürümqi–Kuytun Expressway at the Shangshahe interchange. It continues north and east to Dahuangshan, terminating at the Wucaiwan–Dahuangshan Expressway in Dahuangshan, a town in Fukang city. This portion of the expressway is designated China National Highway 216, and will be designated part of the G7 Beijing–Ürümqi Expressway when the latter expressway is fully constructed (this designation is currently unsigned). Further east past Dahuangshan, the expressway becomes the Dahuangshan–Qitai Expressway, carrying the designation of China National Highway 335.
