= AH65 =

International Highway route in Asia

Asian Highway 65

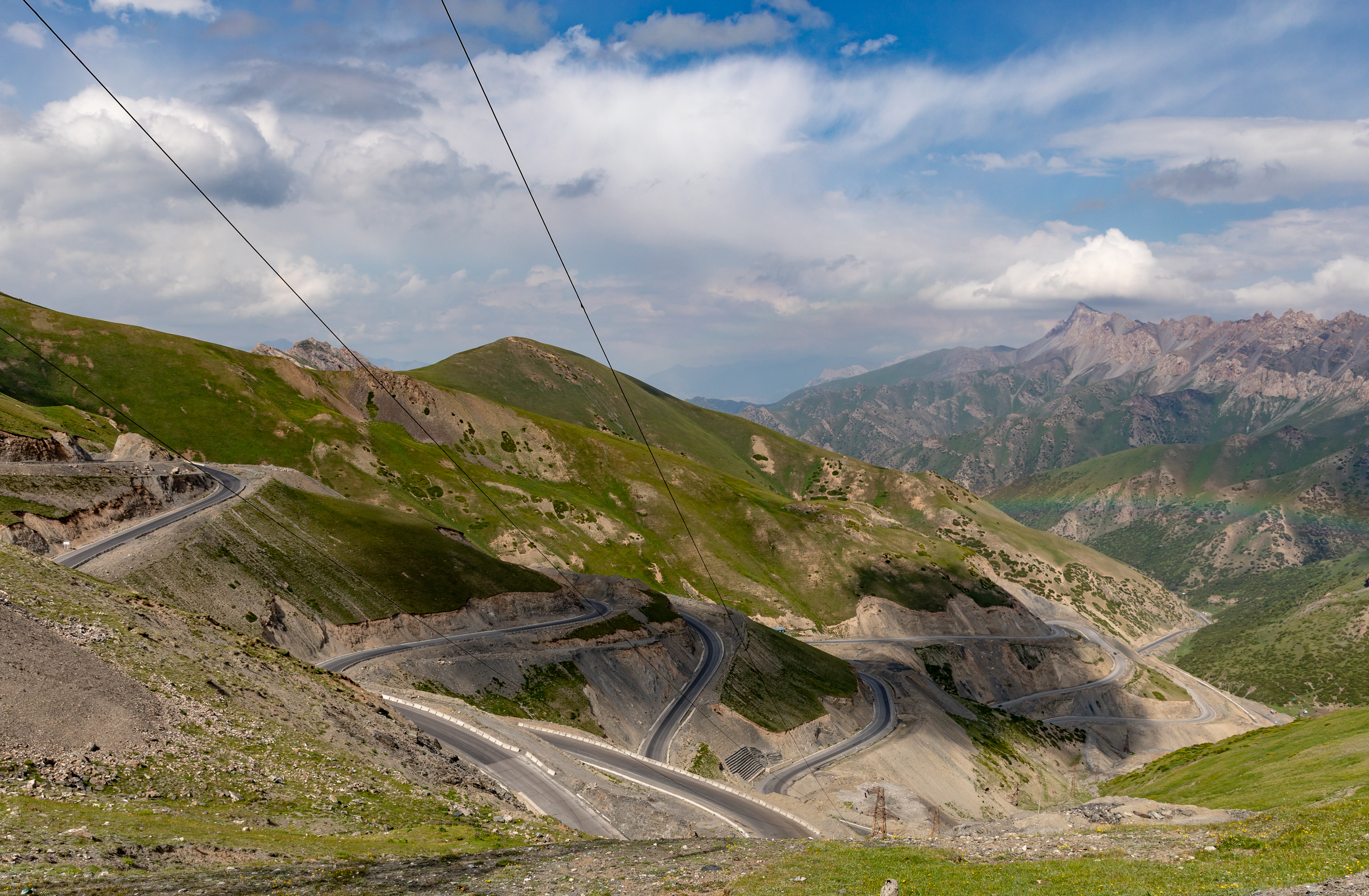
- AH65 near Taldyk Pass in Kyrgyzstan

Route information
- Length: 1,250 km (780 mi)

Major junctions
- East end: Kashi, China
- West end: Termez, Uzbekistan

Location
- Countries: China; Kyrgyzstan; Tajikistan; Uzbekistan

Highway system
- Asian Highway Network
← AH64	→ AH66

Asian Highway 65 (AH65) is a road in the Asian Highway Network that runs 1,250 kilometers (780 mi) from Kashgar, Xinjiang, China to Termez in Uzbekistan. The Irkeshtam–Termez route is also numbered European route E60. The route is as follows:

== China ==
- G314: Kashgar - Kuquwan
- G3012: Kuquwan - junction with G3013
- G3013: junction with G3013 - Ulugqat
- G581: Ulugqat - Erkeshtam

== Kyrgyzstan ==
- ЭМ-05 ЭМ-05 Road:Irkeshtam - Sary-Tash
  - (Branch) ЭМ-05 ЭМ-05 Road: Sary-Tash - Osh
- ЭМ-06 ЭМ-06 Road: Sary-Tash - Karamyk

== Tajikistan ==
- РБ07 РБ07 Road : Karamyk - Vahdat
- РБ04 РБ04 Road : Vahdat - Dushanbe - Tursunzada
- РБ02 РБ02 Road : Dushanbe - Tursunzada

== Uzbekistan ==
- M 41: Denau - Termez
