= Sanchakou–Yarkant Expressway =

Road in Xinjiang, China

Sanchakou–Yarkant Expressway 三岔口–莎车高速公路
- S13 Expressway; Sansha Expressway 三莎高速公路

Route information
- Length: 233.6 km (145.2 mi)
- Existed: November 17, 2014–present

Major junctions
- North end: G3012 / G314 in Sanchakou, Maralbexi County, Kashgar Prefecture, Xinjiang
- Makit–Kashgar Expressway in Makit County, Kashgar Prefecture
- South end: G3012 / G315 in Yarkant County, Kashgar Prefecture

Location
- Country: China
- Province: Xinjiang

Highway system
- Transport in China

The Sanchakou–Yarkant Expressway (Chinese: 三岔口–莎车高速公路), commonly referred to as the S13 Sansha Expressway (Chinese: 三莎高速公路), is an expressway that connects the town of Sanchakou in Maralbexi County with Yarkant County. The route is entirely in the Kashgar Prefecture in the Chinese autonomous region of Xinjiang. It opened on November 17, 2014, and parallels much of Xinjiang Provincial Highway 215. In some sources, the expressway is referred to as the Maralbexi–Yarkant Expressway (Chinese: 巴楚–莎车高速公路), or Basha Expressway (Chinese: 巴莎高速公路) for short.

The expressway connects with the G3012 Turpan–Hotan Expressway at both ends, serving as a bypass of the city centre of Kashgar. It was built with the help of resources from the municipality of Shanghai.
