= Ulaanbaishint =

Ulaanbaishint Улаанбайшинт (Mongolian)
- Tsagaannuur border crossing
- Interactive map of Ulaanbaishint
- Coordinates: 49°36′15″N 89°27′51″E
- Country: Mongolia
- Province: Bayan-Ölgii
- District: Nogoonnuur
- Village: Tsagaannuur

Population (2024)
  - Tsagaannuur: 1,688
- Time zone: UTC+7 (HOVT)

Ulaanbaishint (Mongolian: Улаанбайшинт, lit. 'red-housed') is a settlement in Tsagaannuur, Nogoonnuur, Bayan-Ölgii, Mongolia. It is part of Tsagaannuur village.

== Border crossing ==
In 2005, the Tsagaannuur border crossing was relocated to Ulaanbaishint.
