= Kümüx =

Kümüx كۈمۈش بازىرى 库米什镇 Kumishi, Kʻu-mi-shih
- Town
- Location in Xinjiang Kümüx (China)
- Coordinates: 42°15′15″N 088°11′50″E
- Country: China
- Autonomous Region: Xinjiang
- Prefecture: Turpan
- County: Toksun
- Village-level divisions: 1 residential community, 2 villages

Area
  - Total: 812 km^{2} (314 sq mi)

Population (2010)
  - Total: 1,389
  - Density: 1.71/km^{2} (4.43/sq mi)

Ethnic groups
  - Major ethnic groups: Uyghur
- Time zone: UTC+8 (China Standard)
- Postal code: 838104

Kümüx (Kumishi; كۈمۈش بازىرى / 库米什镇) is a town in Toksun County, Turpan Prefecture, Xinjiang, China.

== Name ==
'Kümüx' (كۈمۈش) means 'silver' in Uyghur. Silver is mined in the area.

Kümüx has also been written in Chinese characters as Kumushi (庫穆什 / 库穆什 and 庫木什 / 库木什).

== History ==
In 1984, Kümüx Town was established.

In December 2010, Zeng Lingquan (曾令权), who ran an adoption agency for the physically and mentally disabled with no operation license in Sichuan, was arrested. Zeng reportedly sent the mentally ill to work in a factory run by Li Xinglin (李兴林) where they were enslaved and worked year round (instead of seasonally as with other local factories) in unsafe conditions at the Jia'ersi Green Construction Material Chemical Factory (佳尔思绿色建材化工厂) in Kümüx.

== Geography ==
The nearby Kuruktag (Kuluketage; 库鲁克塔格) mountains (at around 41°30′N 090°00′E) are a source of gold, silver, copper, lead, zinc, iron and other metals as well as asbestos, marble, mengfeitu (蒙肥土), limestone, table salt, mirabilite, gypsum and quartz.

== Administrative divisions ==
Kümüx includes one residential community and two villages:

Residential community:

- Kümüx (Kumishi; 库米什社区)

Villages:

- Qirghiz tam (Ke'erkezitiemi; قىرغىز تام كەنتى / 柯尔克孜铁米村)
- Yëngi bostan (Yingbositan; يېڭى بوستان كەنتى / 英博斯坦村) 42°11′08″N 088°22′42″E

== Economy ==
Kümüx is an important stop on the road from Ürümqi to Kashgar. There are restaurants, a transport and shipping station, a regional weather station, hotel, post office, gas station, etc. There is little arable land in the surrounding area and spring water is used in irrigation.

== Demographics ==
Historical population
Year	Pop.	±% p.a.
2000	1,119	—
2010	1,389	+2.19%

As of 2003, more than 600 persons lived in Kümüx, mostly Uyghur. As of 1997, 88.1% of the population of Kümüx were Uyghur.

During the Qing Dynasty, Kümüx was described as having twenty or more households.

== Transportation ==
- China National Highway 314
- S24 Shanku Expressway

== Historical maps ==
Historical English-language maps including Kümüx:

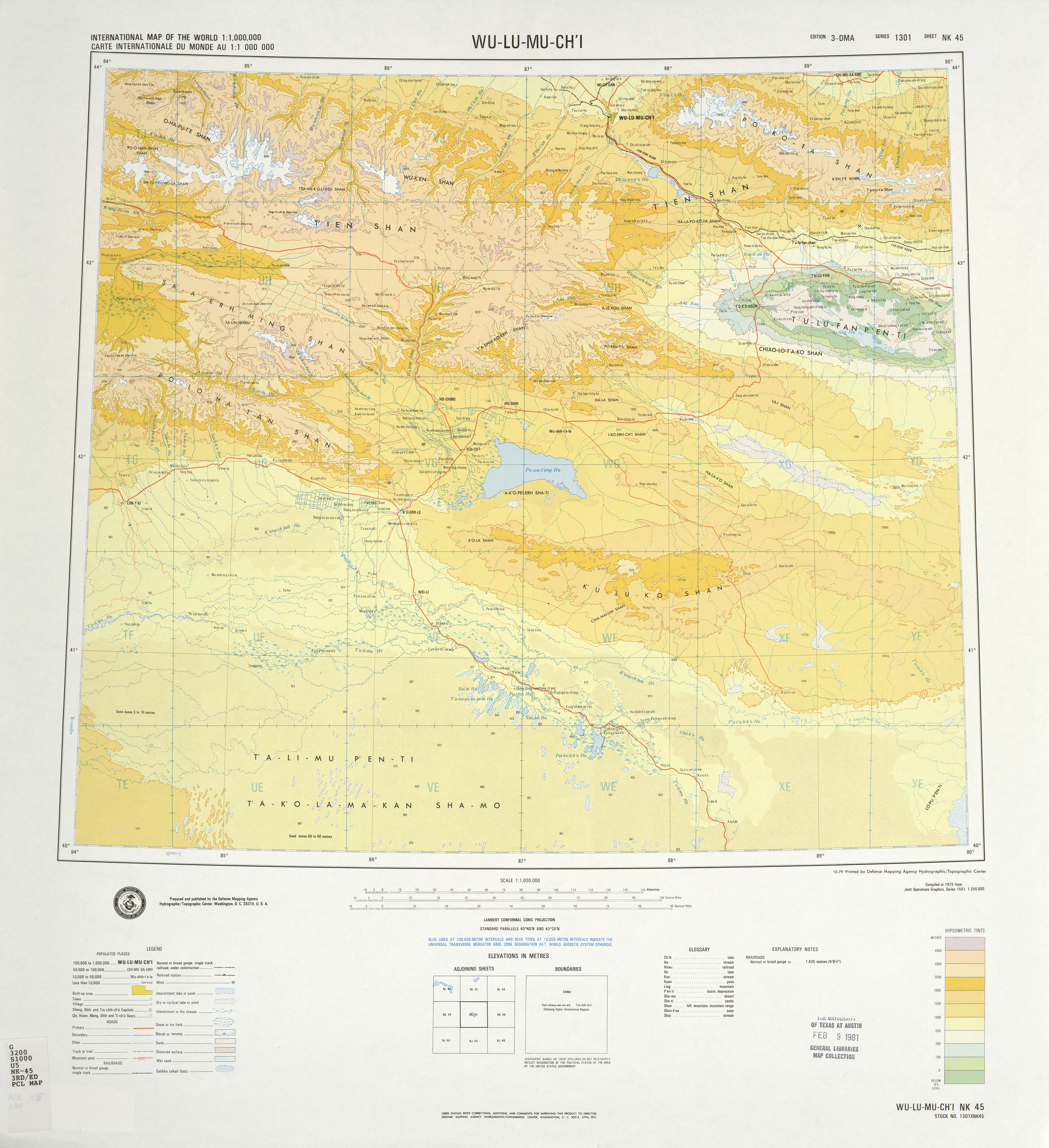
Map including Kümüx (labeled as Kʻu-mi-shih) and surrounding region from the International Map of the World (DMA, 1975)

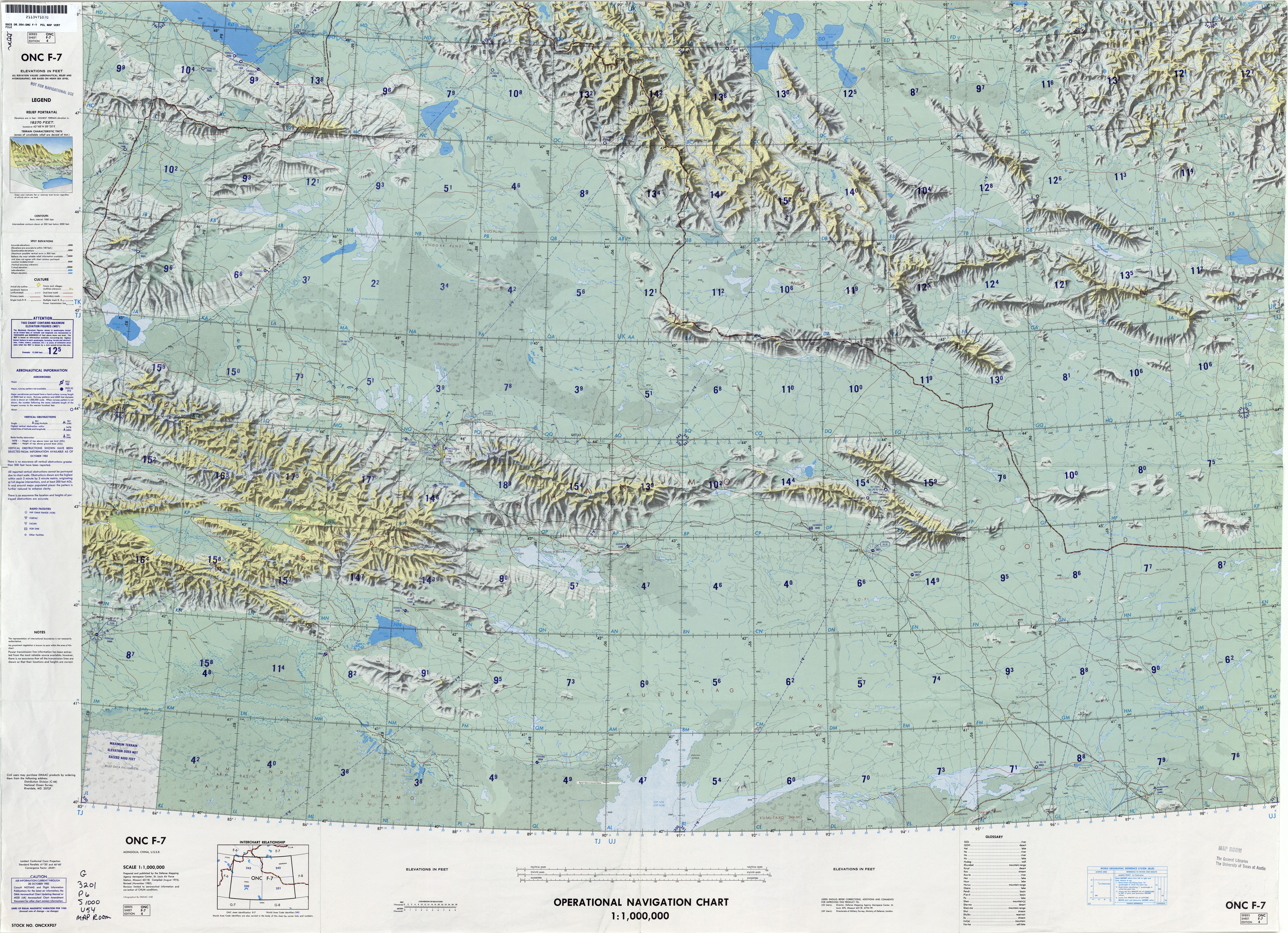
From the Operational Navigation Chart; map including Kumüx (DMA, 1982)

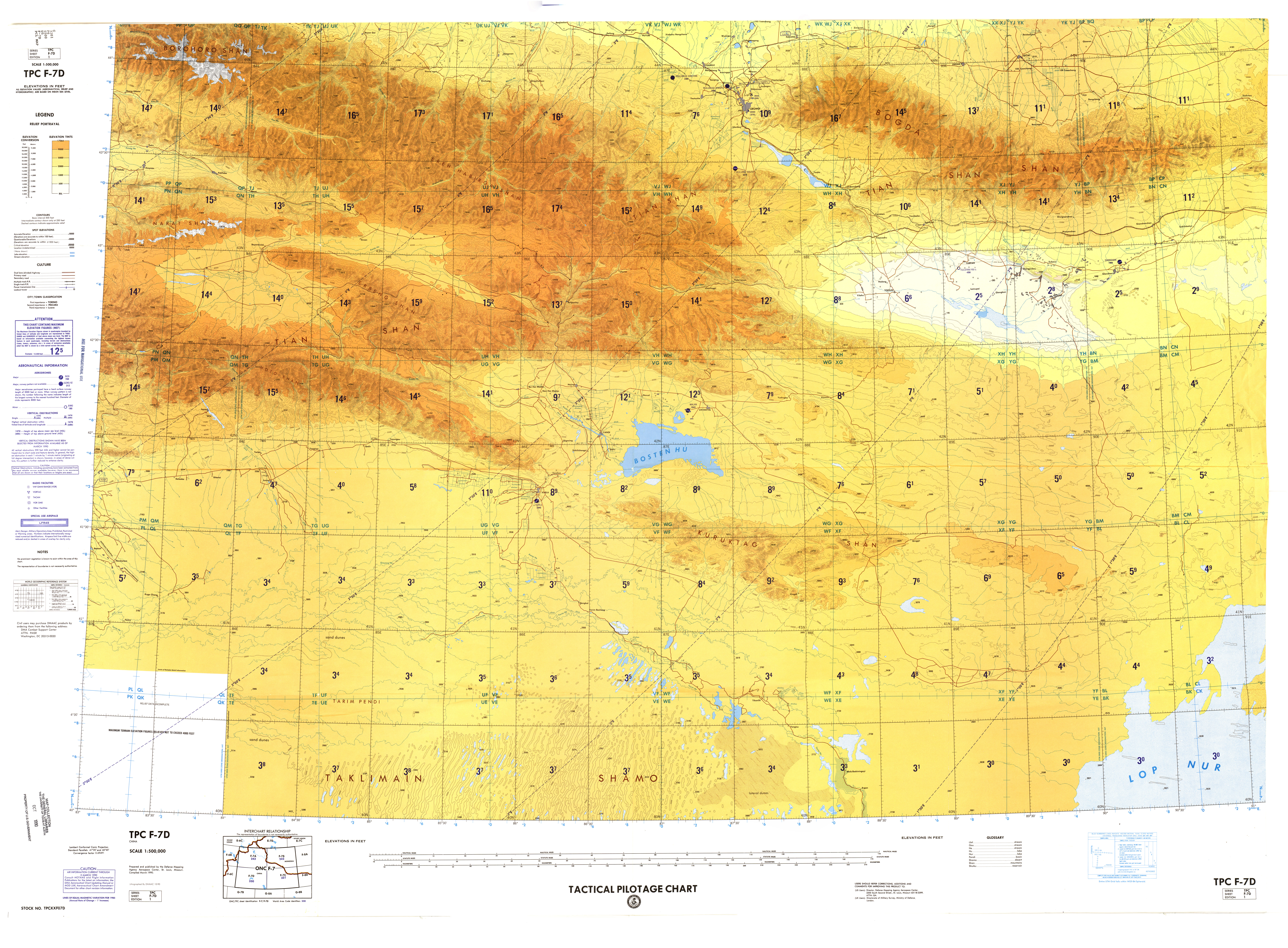
Map including Kümüx (DMA, 1990)
