= Asgat mine =

Mine in Nogoonnuur, Bayan-Ölgii, Mongolia

Asgat Mine
Location
- Location: Bayan-Ölgii, Mongolia

The Asgat mine is one of the largest silver mines in Mongolia and in the world. Asgat Mine sits on the Yustid Ore Cluster in Nogoonnuur District, Bayan-Ölgii Province The mine has estimated reserves of 2,247 tons silver. In addition, the mine is estimated to contain 4,229 tons of Arsenic, 2,092 tons of Zinc, and 8.9 tons of cadmium among other deposits. The mine is not currently in operation. Part of the mine required for access sits across the border in Russia, the location lacks road, rail, water, and power infrastructure.

== History ==
The mine was discovered after the mining exploration being carried out since 1986. In 2019, the Erdenes Mongol LLC took over of the mine from Mongolian-Russian joint venture Mongolrostsvetmet.
