= Irkeshtam =

Mountain pass in China and Kyrgyzstan

- 伊尔克什坦 (Chinese); Эркеч-Там (Kyrgyz); ئەركېچ-تام (Uyghur)
- Erkech-Tam
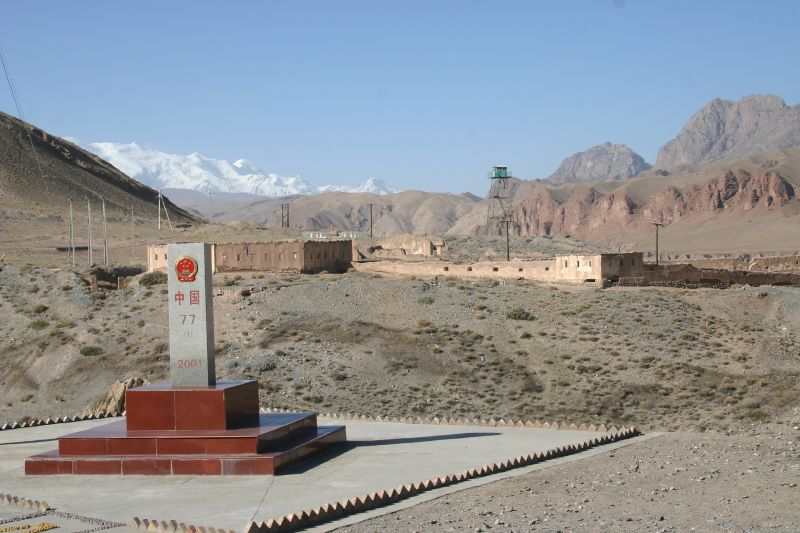
- Chinese border post at Erkeshtam

- Location within Southern Xinjiang Location within Kyrgyzstan
- Interactive map of Irkeshtam
- Elevation: 2,950 m (9,680 ft)
- Traversed by: AH65 – I-585 – I-62 – G3012

Third Approach
- Location: Kyrgyzstan and China
- Range: Pamir Range – Tian Shan
- Coordinates: 39°41′N 73°55′E

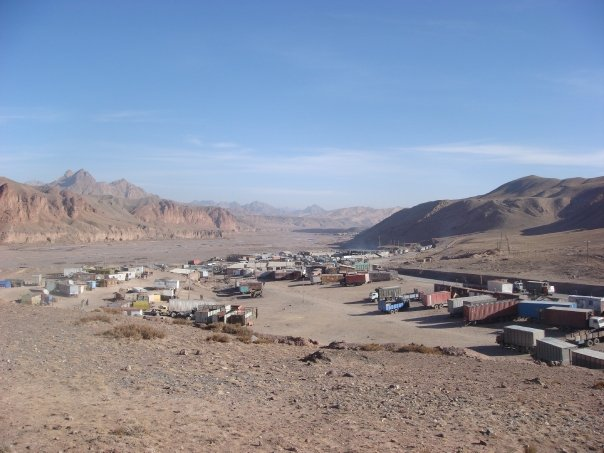
Trucks waiting to cross into China from Kyrgyzstan

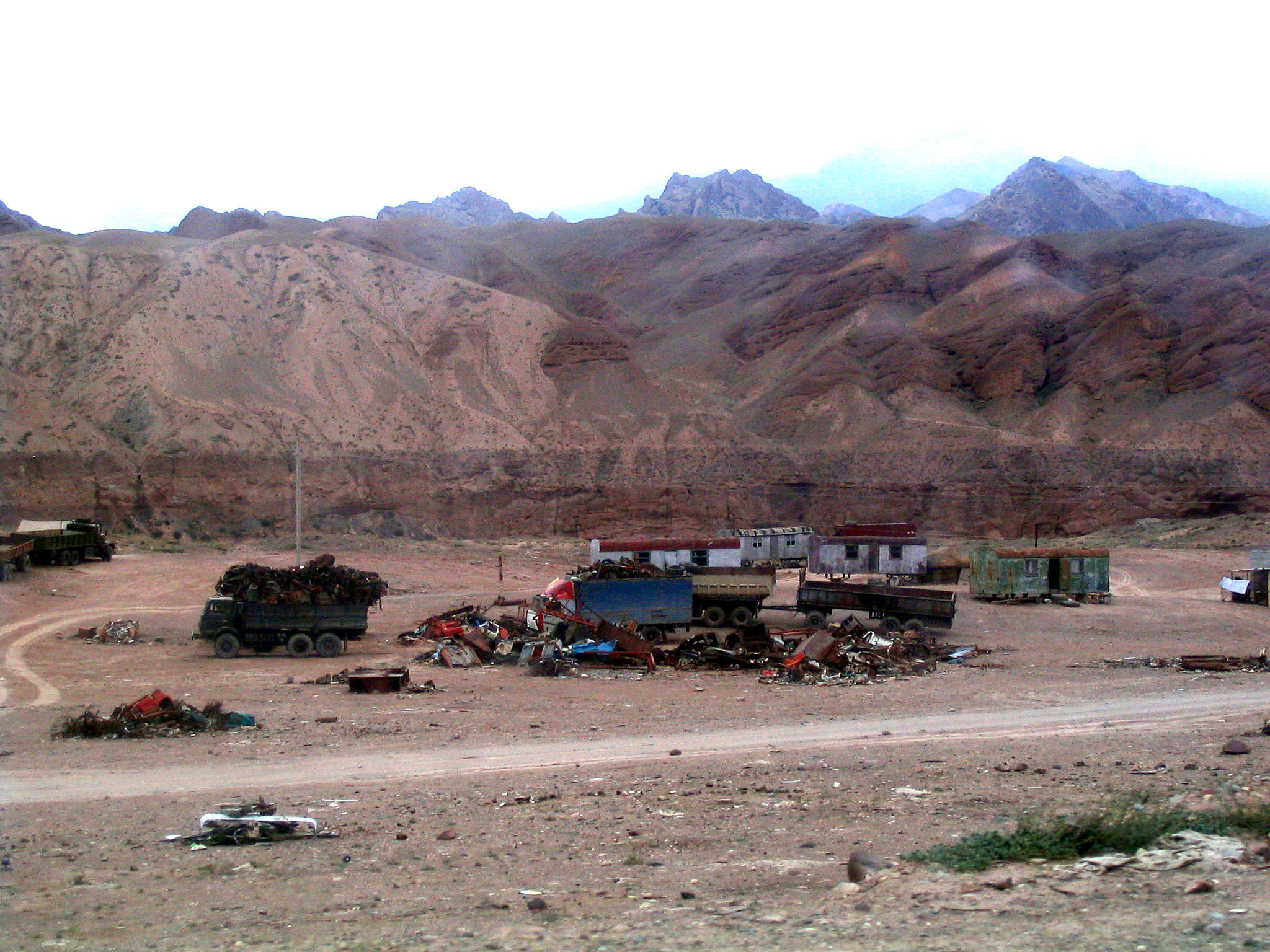
Parts from broken vehicles on the Kyrgyz side of the border

Irkeshtam (Chinese: 伊尔克什坦; pinyin: Yī'ěrkèshéntǎn), known in the Turkic languages as Erkech-Tam (Kyrgyz: Эркеч-Там; Uyghur: ئەركېچ-تام), is a mountain pass and border crossing between Xinjiang, China, and Osh Region, Kyrgyzstan. The closest Chinese settlement is Simhana (斯姆哈纳).

Irkeshtam is the westernmost border crossing in China. It is one of two border crossings between Kyrgyzstan and China, the other being Torugart, some 165 km (103 mi) to the northeast.

== Location ==
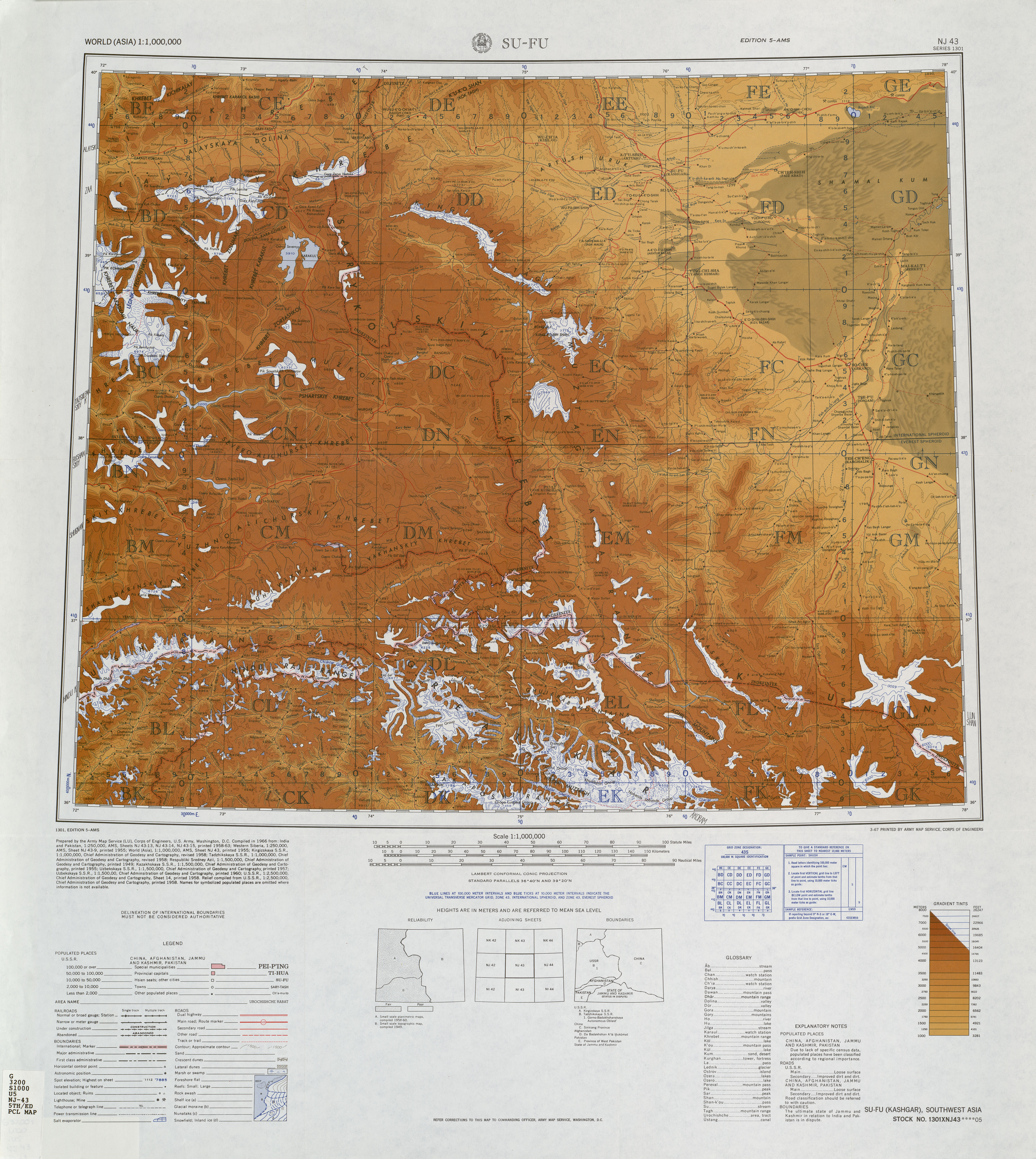
Map including Irkeshtam and surrounding region from the International Map of the World (1966) (Note: From map: "DELINEATION OF INTERNATIONAL BOUNDARIES MUST NOT BE CONSIDERED AUTHORITATIVE")

Irkeshtam Border Crossing is located about 230 kilometres (140 mi) west of Kashgar, 250 kilometres (160 mi) southeast of Osh and 550 kilometres (340 mi) east of Dushanbe, Tajikistan. The crossing straddles the Irkeshtam Pass, a deep gorge where the southern flank of the Tian Shan meets the Pamir Mountains. The elevation of the gorge is approximately 2,950 metres (9,680 ft) above sea level. The village of Irkeshtam is situated about 2 kilometres (1.2 mi) from the Kyrgyz-Chinese border. Both Irkeshtam and the village of Simuhana, about 3.5 kilometres (2.2 mi) on the Chinese side of the border, are situated along the river Eastern Kyzyl-Suu. Simuhana belongs to Ulugqat County, under the Kizilsu Kirghiz Autonomous Prefecture of Xinjiang.

The Irkeshtam Border Crossing controls the main trade routes between the Tarim Basin to the east, and the Alay and Ferghana Valleys to the west and north. On the Kyrgyz side of the border, the A371 road (now EM-05) goes west first over the Irkeshtam Pass (3,005 m) and then over the old Taunmurun (a.k.a. Taukmurun and Tongmurun) Pass (3,536 m) or now the New Silk Road Pass (3,760 m) into the Alay Valley. At Sary-Tash, the A371 (now EM-05) meets the M41 highway, which leads north through the Taldyk Pass (elevation 3,615 metres (11,860 ft) to Osh and the Ferghana Valley. On the Chinese side of the border, the G3013 Kashgar–Irkeshtam Expressway runs east to Kashgar and the Tarim Basin via Ulugqat. From the border till Kansu the road is labeled G581 and connects in Ulugqat to the G30, with 4,243 km Chinas longest expressway up to the Pacific Ocean.

Asian Highway AH65, which runs from Termez, Uzbekistan to Kashgar, China, passes through Irkeshtam. The European route E60, originating from Brest, France, ends at Irkeshtam.

On Mondays and Tuesdays, a bus runs through the pass.

== History ==
Irkeshtam, being located at the natural dividing line between major geographic and cultural regions, has been an important border control point for millennia. It was known during the Han dynasty and the Three Kingdoms era (2nd third of the 3rd century CE) as Juandu (Chinese: 捐毒; Wade–Giles: chüan-tu; lit. 'Tax Control'). According to the Book of Han, Juandu contained "380 households, 1,100 individuals and 500 persons able to bear arms" and the inhabitants were originally of the Sai race, who wore the clothing of the Wusun and followed "the water and pastures" and kept close to the "Ts'ung-ling" (Pamir Mountains).

Irkeshtam is thought to be the Hormeterium (merchants' station) by historians which Ptolemy writes about in his treatise Geography. Some researchers have gone further to suggest it is one of multiple possible locations which he refers to as the Stone Tower. Ptolemy specifically stated that the Hormeterium lay 5 degrees further east. The passage in the Geography where Ptolemy gives the coordinates for the Stone Tower is given below (it was under the control of Sai or Sakai people, and the Komedai referred to is probably the Alai Valley):

In the territory of the Sakai there rises the already mentioned mountain region of the Komedai – the ascent to this mountain region of Sogdiana lies at 125° / 43°, the position of its terminal point near the ravine of the Komedai is at 130° / 39°; the so-called Stone Tower lies at 135° / 43°.

After Tsarist Russia took control of Central Asia, the horse path from Osh to Erkestam was developed in 1893.

In 1934, Khoja Niyaz, the titular leader of the First East Turkestan Republic (officially the Turkic Islamic Republic of East Turkestan or TIRET) was driven out of Kashgar by the Hui warlord Ma Zhongying and retreated via Irkeshtam, where he signed an agreement that dissolved the TIRET and pledged support for Sheng Shicai's Soviet-backed government in Xinjiang. Ma Zhongying also left Xinjiang for the Soviet Union via Irkeshtam.

== Modern border crossing ==
During Soviet times, the border post was named in honor of Andrei Bescennov, a frontier guard, who was killed in a clash with the Basmachi rebels in 1931. Before 1952, Irkeshtam was a trading port between China and the Soviet Union. For decades, the Irkeshtam Border Crossing was closed due to poor relations between the Soviet Union and China. On July 21, 1997, the border crossing was opened on a temporary basis. On January 26, 1998, the border crossing was officially opened. Russian troops were stationed at the post until 1999.

On May 20, 2002, Irkeshtam Port was officially opened. In 2002, the border post processed 8,071 travelers, 7,066 vehicles and 76,000 tons of cargo. In 2008, Irkeshtam processed 58,900 travelers and 520,000 tons of cargo. In December 2011, the customs office on the Chinese side of the border was relocated to a larger facility about 100 km to the east, outside the town of Ulugqat, which is about 1,000 m lower in elevation. In the first eleven months of 2013, 39,045 travelers, 32,554 vehicles and 464,000 tons of goods passed through the Irkeshtam Border Crossing, which ranked fourth among border crossings in Xinjiang by the tonnage of goods processed.

== See also ==
- China–Kyrgyzstan border
- Jigin, westernmost township of China, located near Irkeshtam
