= Makit County =

Makit County مەكىت ناھىيىسى (Uyghur) 麦盖提县 (Chinese) Mekit, Markit, Merket Bazar, Maigaiti, Mai-kai-t'i
- County
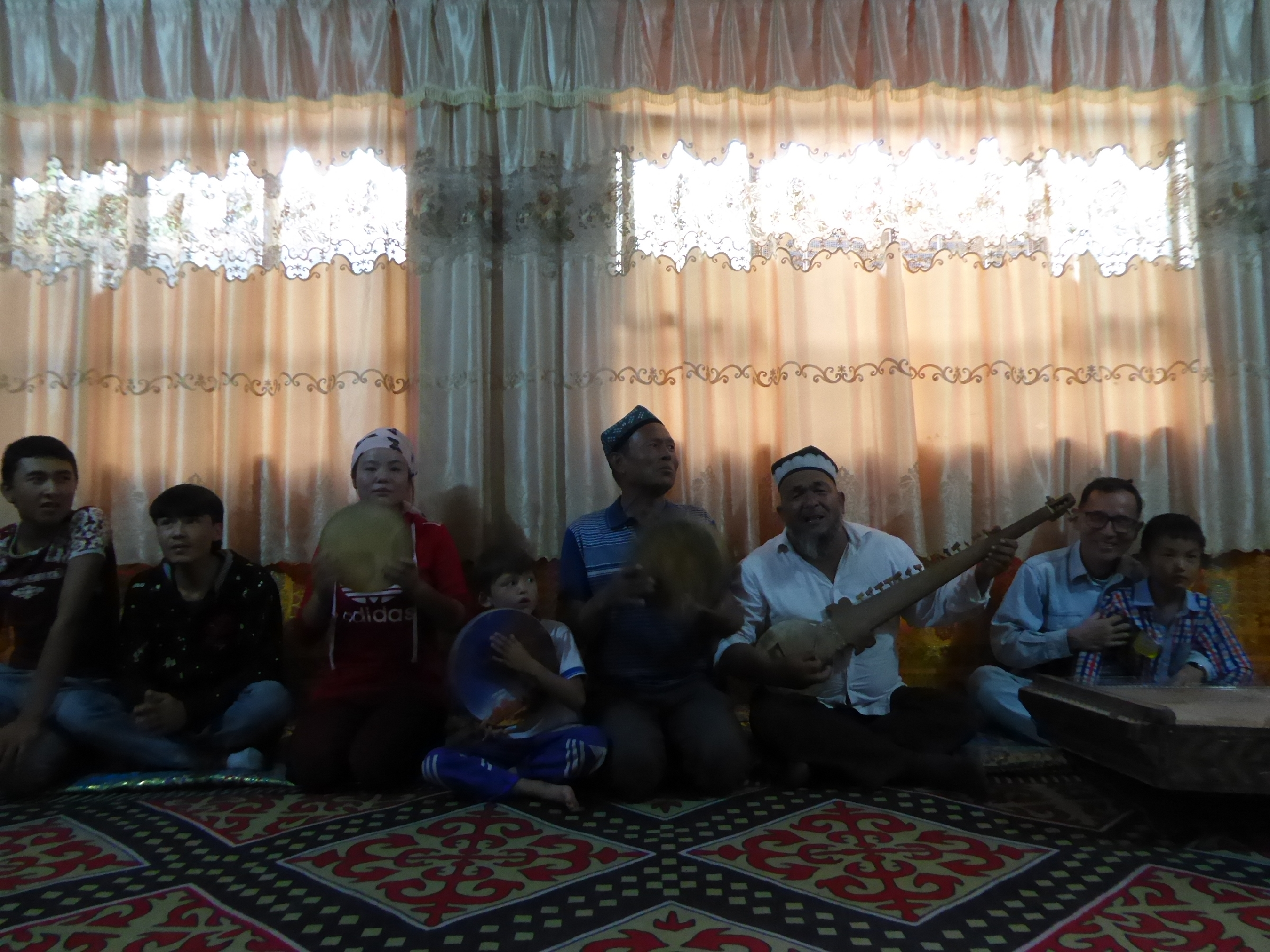

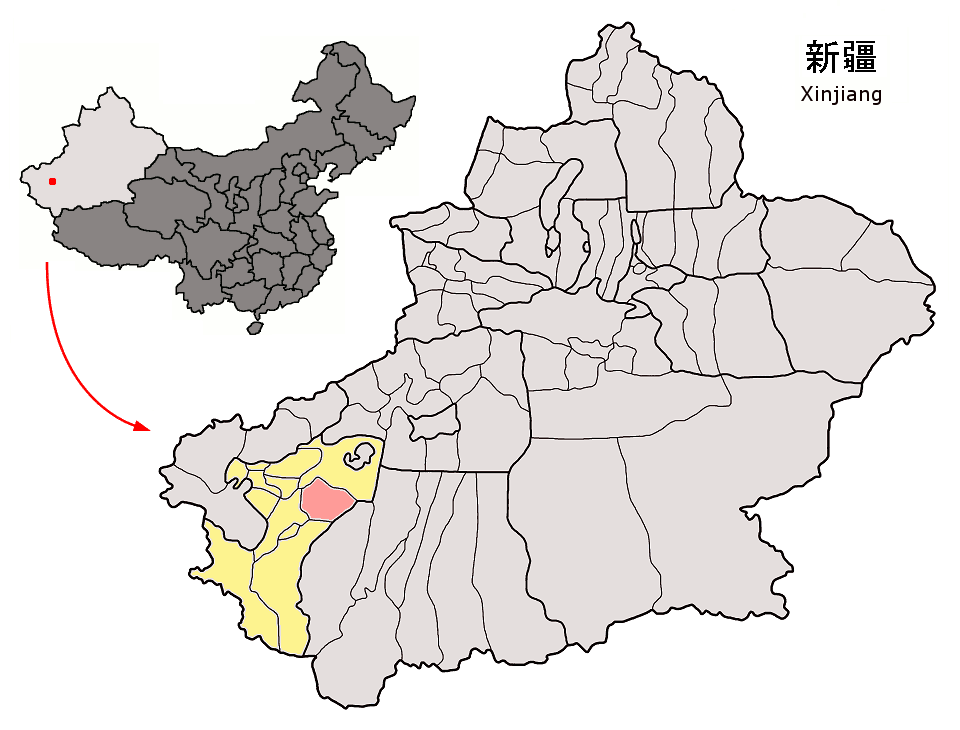
- Location of Makit County (red) within Kashgar Prefecture (yellow) and Xinjiang

- Location of the seat in Xinjiang Makit (Xinjiang) Makit (China)
- Coordinates: 38°54′12″N 77°40′08″E
- Country: China
- Autonomous region: Xinjiang
- Prefecture: Kashgar
- County seat: Makit

Area
  - Total: 11,022.53 km^{2} (4,255.82 sq mi)

Population (2020)
  - Total: 224,154
  - Density: 20.3360/km^{2} (52.6700/sq mi)

Ethnic groups
  - Major ethnic groups: Uyghur, Han Chinese
- Time zone: UTC+8 (China Standard (Note: Locals in Xinjiang frequently observe UTC+6 (Xinjiang Time), 2 hours behind Beijing.))
- Postal code: 844600
- Website: www.mgt.gov.cn

Mekit County

Uyghur name
- Uyghur: مەكىت ناھىيىسى
Transcriptions
- Yengi Yeziⱪ: Məkit naⱨiyisi
- SASM/GNC: Makit
- Siril Yëziqi: Мәкит наһийиси

Chinese name
- Traditional Chinese: 麥蓋提縣
- Simplified Chinese: 麦盖提县
Transcriptions
Standard Mandarin
- Hanyu Pinyin: Màigàití Xiàn
- Wade–Giles: Mai^{4}-kai^{4}-t'i^{2} Hsien^{4}

Makit County is a county in Kashgar Prefecture, Xinjiang Uyghur Autonomous Region, China. It contains an area of 10,927 km^{2} (4,219 sq mi). The Yarkand River passes through the county. The county is bordered to the north by Maralbexi County, to the east by Guma County (Pishan) in Hotan Prefecture, to the west by Yarkant County, and to the south by Kargilik County.

== Name ==
The name of the county is also transliterated from Uyghur as Markit, Mekit and Merket, and from Mandarin Chinese as Maigaiti (Mai-kai-t'i, Maikaiti).

== History ==
In 1928, Makit County was created as part of Kashgar Circuit (喀什噶爾道).

In 2002, 240 Tajik (China) households displaced from Taxkorgan reclaimed a desert village in the county.

In early 2011, a Uyghur butcher in Makit County and six friends were arrested in connection with the stabbing death of a Han Chinese prostitute.

As part of the policies of Chen Quanguo, 61 convenience police stations were being built in the county in 2016.

In August 2018, a 10-year-old boy whose parents were detained in the Xinjiang re-education camps drowned in the Zerepshan River.

According to an anonymous Uyghur local government employee quoted in a Radio Free Asia article, during Ramadan 2020 (April 23 to May 23), residents of the county were told they could face punishment for fasting including being sent to a re-education camp.

== Climate ==
The number of days of dusty/sandy weather per annum in Makit County has dropped from 106 in 2010 to 40 in 2018. Over the same period, annual rainfall increased from 53.6 mm (2.11 in) to 109.6 mm (4.31 in) per year.

Climate data for Makit, elevation 1,178 m (3,865 ft), (1991–2020 normals, extremes 1981–2010)
Month	Jan	Feb	Mar	Apr	May	Jun	Jul	Aug	Sep	Oct	Nov	Dec	Year
Record high °C (°F)	19.0 (66.2)	18.7 (65.7)	30.9 (87.6)	35.4 (95.7)	36.7 (98.1)	39.6 (103.3)	39.3 (102.7)	40.4 (104.7)	35.4 (95.7)	30.3 (86.5)	25.9 (78.6)	19.3 (66.7)	40.4 (104.7)
Mean daily maximum °C (°F)	0.9 (33.6)	7.3 (45.1)	16.6 (61.9)	24.5 (76.1)	28.6 (83.5)	32.0 (89.6)	33.1 (91.6)	31.5 (88.7)	27.7 (81.9)	21.5 (70.7)	12.2 (54.0)	3.1 (37.6)	19.9 (67.9)
Daily mean °C (°F)	−5.4 (22.3)	0.4 (32.7)	9.3 (48.7)	16.7 (62.1)	20.8 (69.4)	24.0 (75.2)	25.3 (77.5)	23.8 (74.8)	19.3 (66.7)	12.0 (53.6)	3.7 (38.7)	−3.2 (26.2)	12.2 (54.0)
Mean daily minimum °C (°F)	−10.9 (12.4)	−5.7 (21.7)	2.4 (36.3)	9.2 (48.6)	13.3 (55.9)	16.6 (61.9)	18.4 (65.1)	17.2 (63.0)	12.0 (53.6)	4.2 (39.6)	−3.0 (26.6)	−8.1 (17.4)	5.5 (41.8)
Record low °C (°F)	−25.5 (−13.9)	−27.0 (−16.6)	−6.2 (20.8)	−1.0 (30.2)	3.6 (38.5)	7.4 (45.3)	11.0 (51.8)	9.3 (48.7)	3.0 (37.4)	−4.6 (23.7)	−11.9 (10.6)	−21.1 (−6.0)	−27.0 (−16.6)
Average precipitation mm (inches)	1.6 (0.06)	1.8 (0.07)	2.8 (0.11)	4.2 (0.17)	10.2 (0.40)	8.2 (0.32)	15.0 (0.59)	10.1 (0.40)	6.7 (0.26)	1.0 (0.04)	1.4 (0.06)	1.2 (0.05)	64.2 (2.53)
Average precipitation days (≥ 0.1 mm)	1.4	1.1	0.9	1.5	3.0	3.8	4.7	3.9	2.4	0.7	0.4	1.4	25.2
Average snowy days	5.0	2.2	0.3	0	0	0	0	0	0	0	0.3	3.6	11.4
Average relative humidity (%)	63	55	43	37	41	45	52	58	60	59	59	66	53
Mean monthly sunshine hours	161.6	168.3	193.7	218.2	270.6	306.2	306.6	276.3	255.6	253.3	207.1	163.7	2,781.2
Percentage possible sunshine	53	55	52	54	61	69	69	67	70	75	70	56	63
Source: China Meteorological Administration

== Administrative divisions ==
The county includes 2 towns and 8 townships.

Name	Simplified Chinese	Hanyu Pinyin	Uyghur (UEY)	Uyghur Latin (ULY)	Administrative division code	Notes
Towns
Makit Town	麦盖提镇	Màigàití Zhèn	مەكىت بازىرى	mekit baziri	653127100	
Bazarjemi Town	巴扎结米镇	Bāzhājiémǐ Zhèn	بازارجەمى بازىرى	bazarjemi baziri	653127101	formerly Bazarjemi Township (بازارجەمى يېزىسى / 巴扎结米乡)
Townships
Shehitdong Township	希依提墩乡	Xīyītídūn Xiāng	شېھىتدۆڭ يېزىسى	shëhitdöng yëzisi	653127201	
Yantak Township	央塔克乡	Yāngtǎkè Xiāng	يانتاق يېزىسى	yantaq yëzisi	653127202	
Tümantal Township	吐曼塔勒乡	Tǔmàntǎlè Xiāng	تۈمەنتال يېزىسى	tümental yëzisi	653127203	
Ghazkol Township	尕孜库勒乡	Gǎzīkùlè Xiāng	غازكۆل يېزىسى	ghazköl yëzisi	653127204	
Qizilawat Township	克孜勒阿瓦提乡	Kèzīlè'āwǎtí Xiāng	قىزىلئاۋات يېزىسى	qizil'awat yëzisi	653127205	
Qumqisar Township	库木库萨尔乡	Kùmùkùsà'ěr Xiāng	قۇمقىسار يېزىسى	qumqisar yëzisi	653127206	
Hangghitliq Township	昂格特勒克乡	Ánggétèlèkè Xiāng	ھاڭغىتلىق يېزىسى	hangghitliq yëzisi	653127207	
Qurma Township	库尔玛乡	Kù'ěrmǎ Xiāng	قۇرما يېزىسى	qurma yëzisi	653127208	

== Economy ==
The county has a highly developed irrigation system. Agricultural products of the county include cotton, corn, wheat, flax, melons, and sugar beet. The livestock industry is strong. Local specialities include dried apricot and raisins. Industries include coal mining, tractor manufacture, construction, textiles, etc.

== Demographics ==
Historical population
Year	Pop.	±% p.a.
2000	201,810	—
2010	258,978	+2.53%

As of 2015, 225,608 of the 272,010 residents of the county were Uyghur, 45,241 were Han Chinese and 1,161 were from other ethnic groups.

According to the 2002 census, it has a population of 220,000.

As of 1999, 78.36% of the population of Makit (Markit, Maigaiti) County was Uyghur and 21.43% of the population was Han Chinese.

== Transportation ==
- Sanchakou–Yarkant Expressway

== Historical maps ==
Historical English-language maps including Makit:

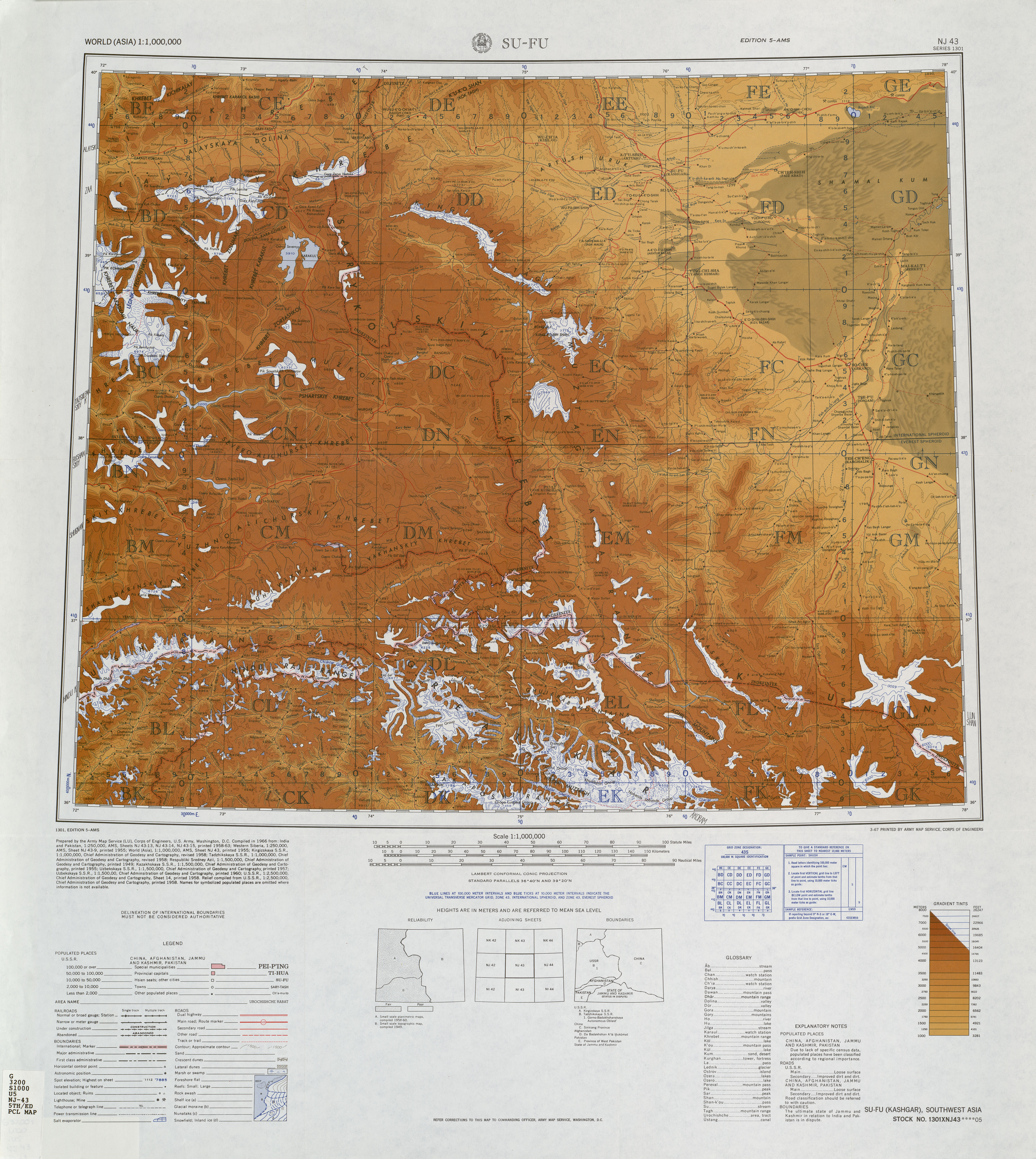
Map including Makit (labeled as MAI-KAI-T'I (MERKET)) and surrounding region from the International Map of the World (AMS, 1966)

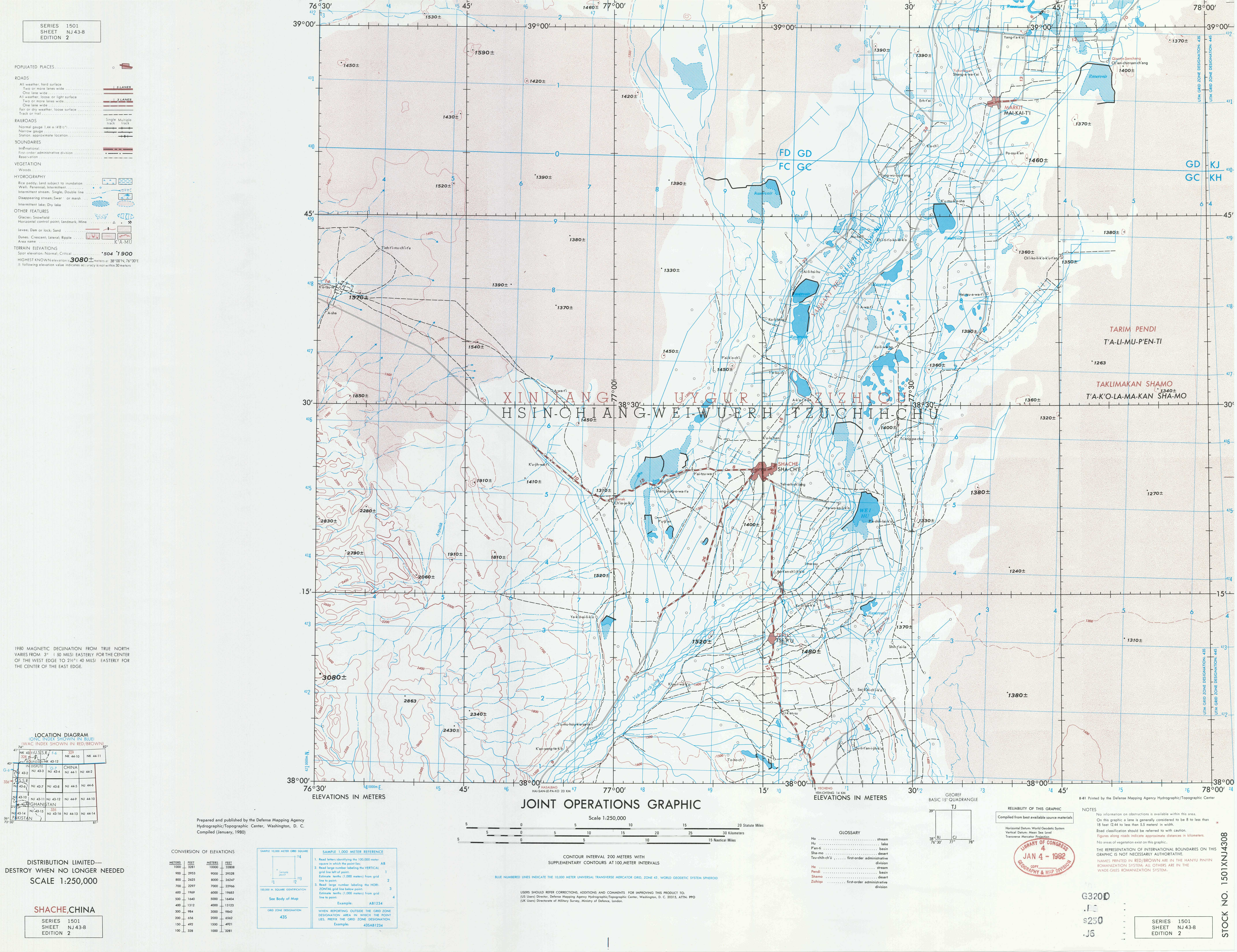
Map including Makit (labeled as MARKIT (MAI-KAI-T'I)) (DMA, 1980)

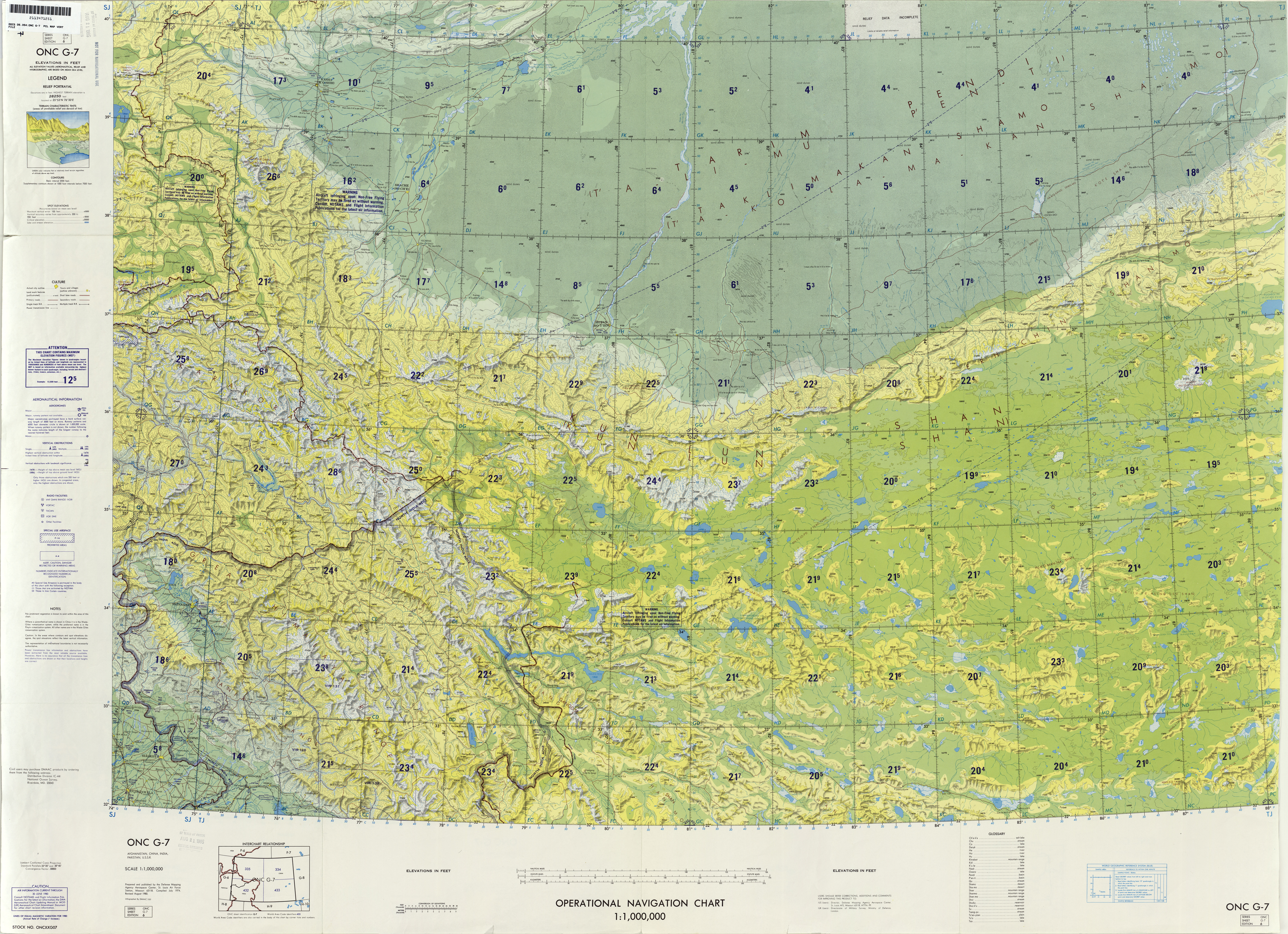
From the Operational Navigation Chart; map including Makit (labeled as Markit (Mai-kai-t'i))(DMA, 1980) (Note: From map: "The representation of international boundaries is not necessarily authoritative.")

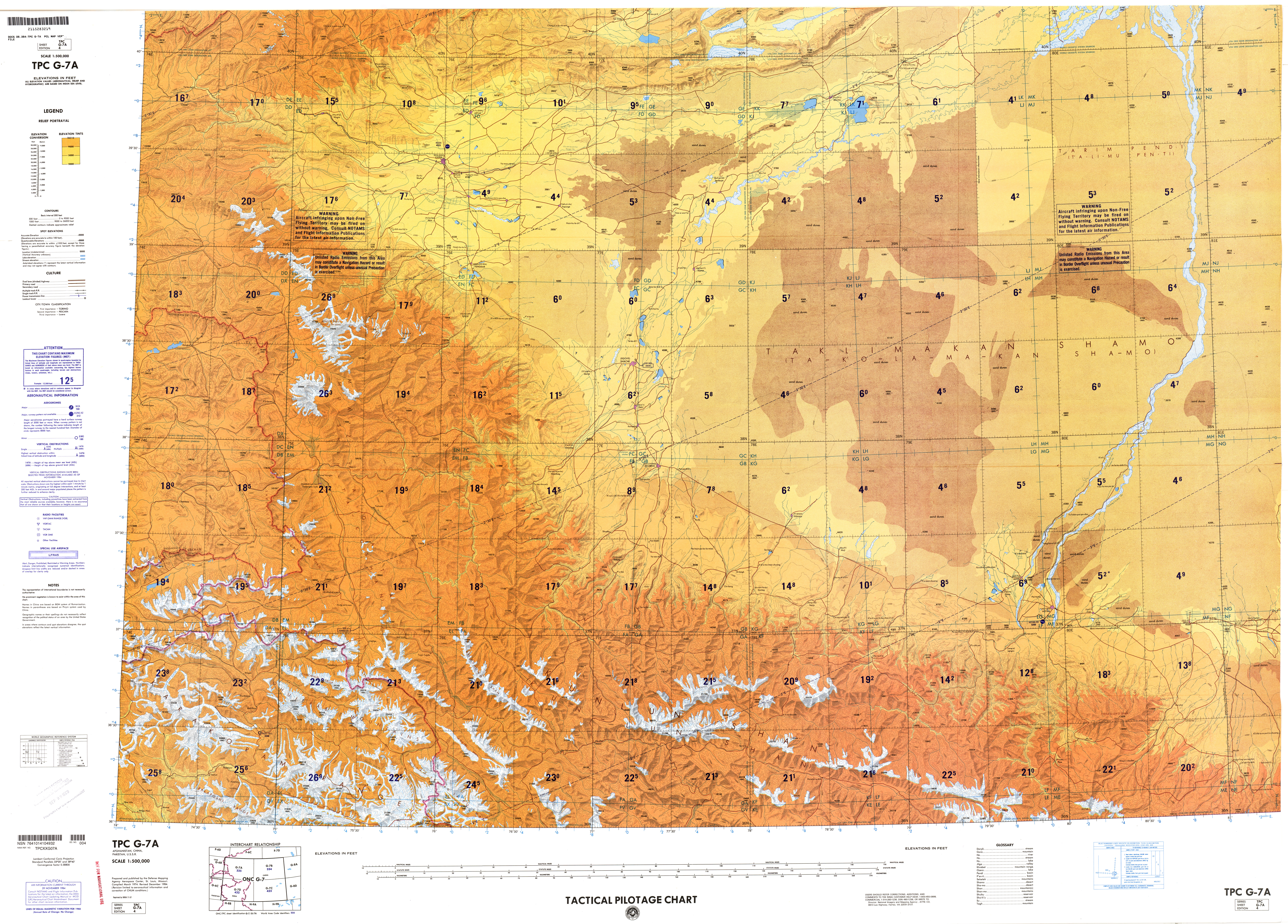
Map including Makit (labeled as Markit (Mai-kai-t'i)) (DMA, 1984) (Note: From map: "The representation of international boundaries is not necessarily authoritative")

== See also ==
- Yarkand River
