= G3012 Turpan–Hotan Expressway =

Road in China

Turpan–Hotan Expressway
- تۇرپان-خوتەن چىڭسىخوزا-غۇلجا
- Tuhe Expressway 吐和高速公路

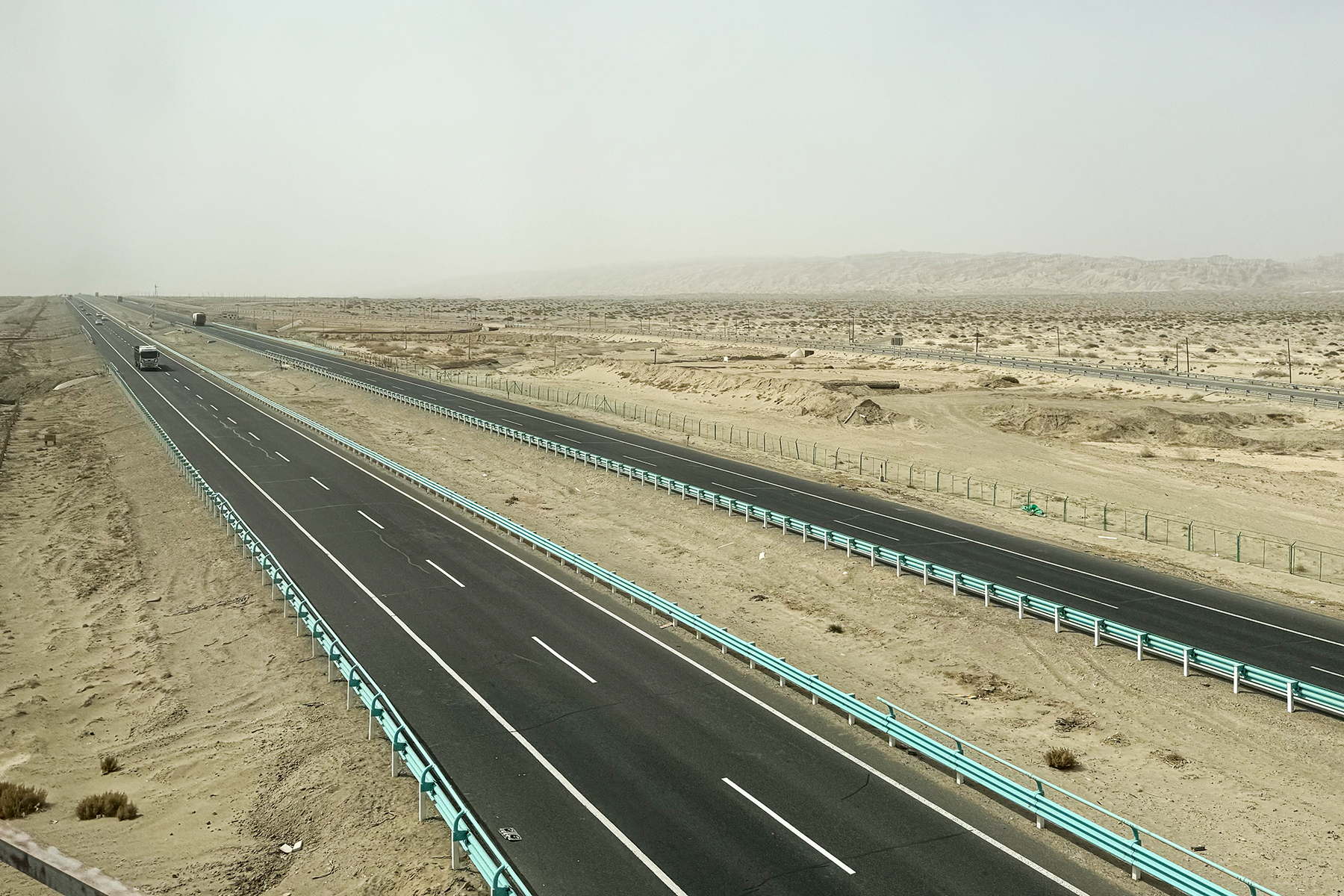
- G3012 Expressway in Onsu County, Aksu

Route information
- Auxiliary route of G30
- Part of AH4
- Length: 1,931 km (1,200 mi)

Major junctions
- North end: G30 / G312 (Tuwuda Expressway) in Xiaocaohu, Toksun
- G218 in Korla; G217 in Kuqa; Sansha Expressway in Maralbexi; G3013 in Artux; S16 Maika Expressway in Kashgar; S13 Sansha Expressway in Yarkant; G315 in Yecheng; Unbuilt gap G315 in Karakax
- South end: G0612 in Celle

Location
- Country: China
- Provinces: Xinjang

Highway system
- National Trunk Highway System; Primary; Auxiliary; National Highways; Transport in China
← G3011	→ G3013

The G3012 Turpan–Hotan Expressway (Chinese: 吐鲁番—和田高速公路, Uyghur: تۇرپان-خوتەن يۇقىرى سۈرئەتلىك تاشيولى), commonly referred to as the Tuhe Expressway (Chinese: 吐和高速公路), is a Chinese expressway that connects the G30 Lianyungang–Khorgas Expressway at Xiaocaohu, in Toksun County, Turpan, with China National Highway 315 in Lop County, Hotan Prefecture. The expressway is a spur of the G30 Lianyungang–Khorgas Expressway and is completely in Xinjiang. It is 1,931 kilometres (1,200 mi) in length, which is unusually long for an expressway under a single sub-national administration, being vastly longer than Interstate 10 in Texas.

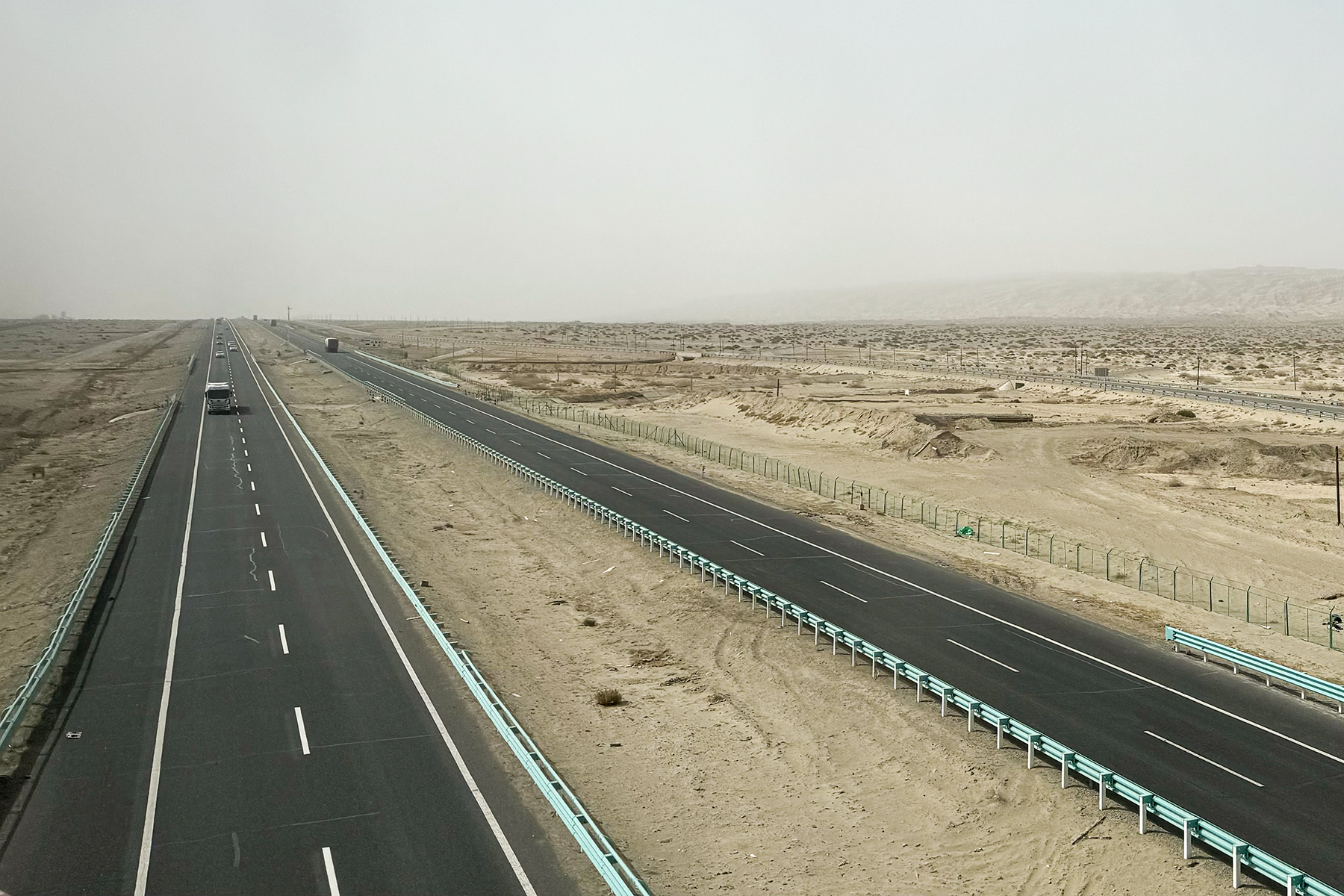
G3012 Expressway in Onsu County, Aksu

The expressway is fully complete from its northern terminus in Toksun to Yecheng and from Karakax County to its southern terminus in Lop County, Hotan. Only a section from Kargilik to Karakax County remains to be built. Eventually, the southern terminus will connect with the western end of the G0612 Xining–Hotan Expressway, which is currently in the planning stage.
