= Tsagaannuur, Bayan-Ölgii =

Village in Bayan-Ölgii Province, Mongolia

Tsagaannuur Цагааннуур тосгон ᠴᠠᠭᠠᠨ ᠨᠠᠭᠤᠷᠲᠣᠰᠬᠤᠨ
- Village
- Location in Mongolia
- Coordinates: 49°30′25″N 89°43′53″E
- Country: Mongolia
- Province: Bayan-Ölgii
- District: Nogoonnuur

Population
  - Estimate (2024): 1,688
- Time zone: UTC+7

Tsagaannuur (Mongolian: Цагааннуур, white lake) is a tosgon (village) located within Nogoonnuur District of Bayan-Ölgii Province in western Mongolia. It is primarily inhabited by ethnic Kazakhs. As of 2024 estimate, it had a population of 1688 people.

== Tsagaannuur Free Economic Zone ==
The Tsagaan Nuur Free Economic Zone was established in November 2005 to catalyze the development of the western region of Mongolia. The Free Economic Zone is about 708.4 hectares in size and is on flat land covered with pebble and rocky soil. Two rivers flowing by on the west and north sides of the Free Economic Zone form the water supplies for the zone. The Tsagaan Nuur Free Economic Zone has been granted the following special free trade features:

- Goods imported from overseas to a free zone shall be exempt from the levy of import tax, customs duties, VAT, and excise tax.
- No taxes shall be charged for goods entering a free zone, which are previously imported into the customs territory upon payment of import tax, customs duties, VAT, and excise tax. Deductions shall be made from other taxes against the presentation of payment receipts for taxes paid in the customs territory.
- No taxes shall be levied on goods exiting a free zone to overseas
