= G3013 Artux–Erkeshtam Expressway =

Expressway in Xinjiang, China

Artux–Erkeshtam Expressway
- قەشقەر-ئەرکەشتام چىڭسىخوزا-غۇلجا
- Ayi Expressway 阿伊高速公路
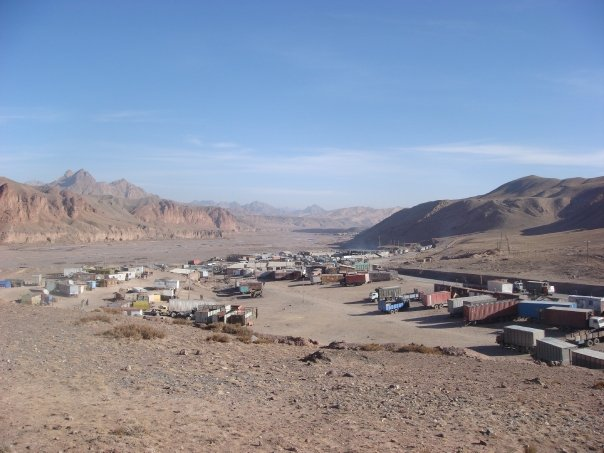
- The Artux–Erkeshtam Expressway connects the city of Artux with the Erkeshtam border checkpoint, pictured above.

Route information
- Auxiliary route of G30
- Part of AH61 AH65
- Length: 213.9 km (132.9 mi)
- Existed: October 2013–present

Major junctions
- East end: G30 Artux JCT in Artux, Kizilsu
- West end: Kyrgyzstan, A371 A371 Highway E60 in Irkeshtam

Location
- Country: China

Highway system
- National Trunk Highway System; Primary; Auxiliary; National Highways; Transport in China
← G3012	→ G3014

The Artux–Erkeshtam Expressway (Chinese: 阿图什—伊尔克什坦高速公路, Uyghur: ئاتۇش-ئەرکەشتام سۇرئەتلىك یولى), commonly referred to as the Ayi Expressway (Chinese: 阿伊高速公路) and designated G3013, is a 213.9-kilometre-long roadway (132.9 mi) in the Chinese autonomous region of Xinjiang. It connects the Artux city and Ulugqat County of Kizilsu. It's a spur route of G30.

== Route ==
The former Kashgar–Erkeshtam Expressway (喀伊高速公路) begins in the east at the Takuti Bridge of the G3012 Turpan–Hotan Expressway, in the county-level city of Artux. It travels westward through Ulugqat County, through the village of Ulugqat (also known as Wuqia), which serves as the Chinese immigration checkpoint, before terminating at the border with Kyrgyzstan at Erkeshtam.

The highway is not built to expressway standards for its entire length. Its length is 213.9 km (132.9 mi), but only 77.4 km (48.1 mi) of that is expressway-grade and the rest is second-grade highway, consisting of 19.5 km (12.1 mi) of newly built roadway and 117 km (73 mi) of upgraded roadway.

The route and terminus were renamed several times, originally combined with G3012 as "Turpan–Hotan–Erkeshtam Expressway", then in 7918 network G3013 is split from G3012, called "Kashgar–Erkeshtam Expressway". In the non-mandatory national standard GB/T 917–2017, the G3013 route is called "Turpan–Erkeshtam Expressway", meaning that this route is concurrent with G3012 between Turpan and Kashgar, but due to difficulties in maintaining route signs, in 2022 the G3013 was shortened. The current terminus is located at Artux to reflect the actual location of the eastern junction.

== See also ==
- Kiziloy
