= Nogoonnuur =

District in Bayan-Ölgii Province, Mongolia

Coordinates: 49°36′54″N 90°14′58″E

Nogoonnuur District Ногооннуур сум ᠨᠣᠭᠤᠭᠠᠨᠨᠠᠭᠤᠷᠰᠤᠮᠤ
- District
- Interactive map of Nogoonnuur District
- Country: Mongolia
- Province: Bayan-Ölgii Province

Population (2014)
  - Total: 6,003
- Time zone: UTC+7 (UTC + 7)

Nogoonnuur (Mongolian: Ногооннуур, green lake) is a sum (district) of Bayan-Ölgii Province in western Mongolia. It is primarily inhabited by ethnic Kazakhs. As of 2014 it had a population of 6003 people.

== History ==
The district was established in 1952.

== Administrative divisions ==
The district is divided into 12 bags, which are:

- Achit nuur
- Asgant
- Bakhlag
- Chikhtei
- Khasiin ulaan
- Khovd
- Morin tolgoi
- Shar govi
- Tsagaanbuur
- Tsagaannuur
- Ulaan chuluu
- Yamaat

== Geology ==
The district consists of three protected areas, which are Selhemiin B region, Achit Lake area and Devel area.

== Economy ==
Part of the potentially valuable Asgat Ag-Sb deposit is within Nogoonnuur where the Asgat mine is situated on the border with Russia. Livestock is another major economic sector in the district with total livestock amounted 230,000.

== Infrastructure ==
The district has a total of 689 water wells, in which 410 of them are for drinking.
