= Toksun County =

Toksun County: توقسۇن ناھىيىسى (Uyghur); 托克逊县 (Chinese); Tuokexun, T'o-k'o-hsün
- County
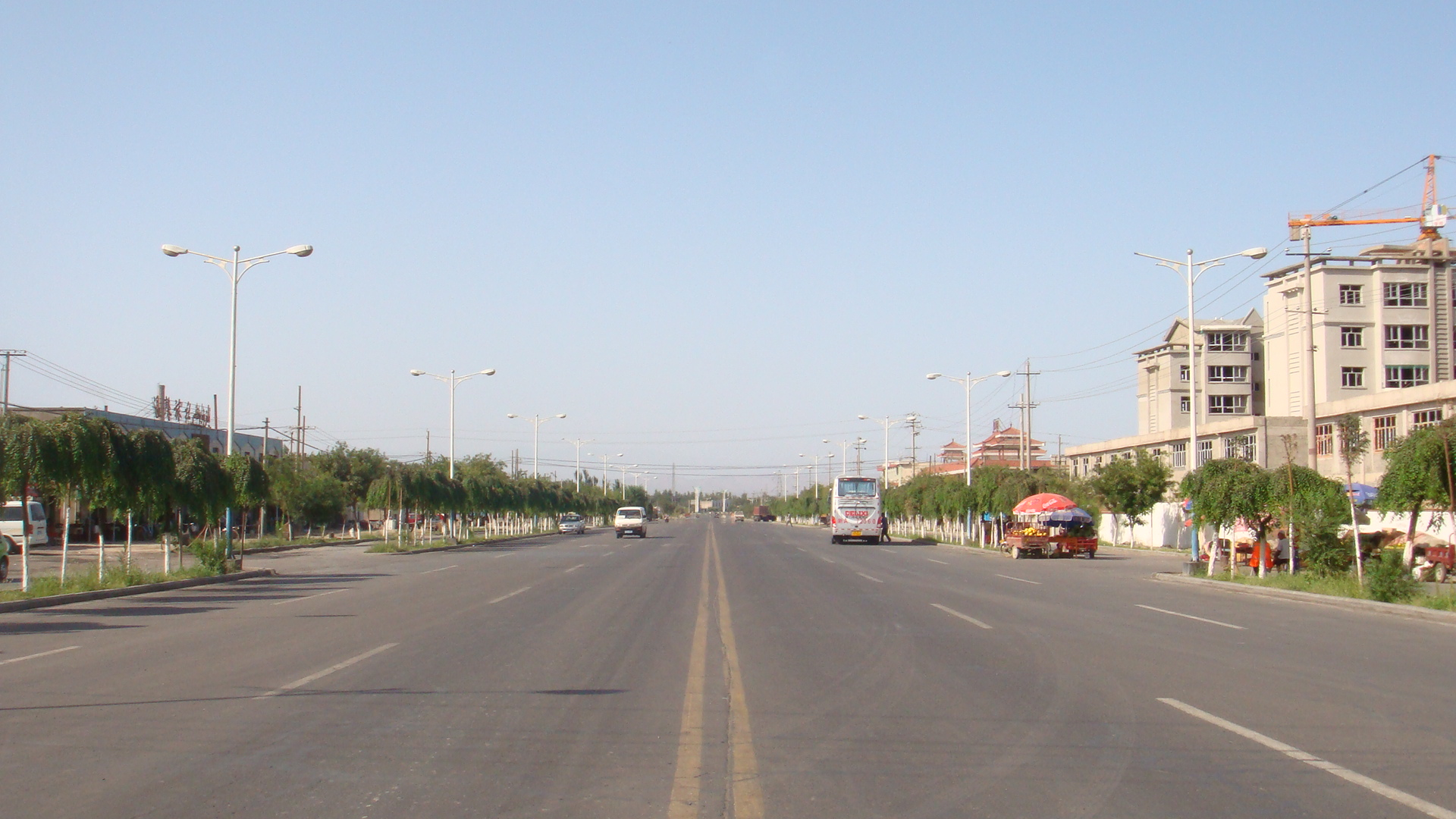

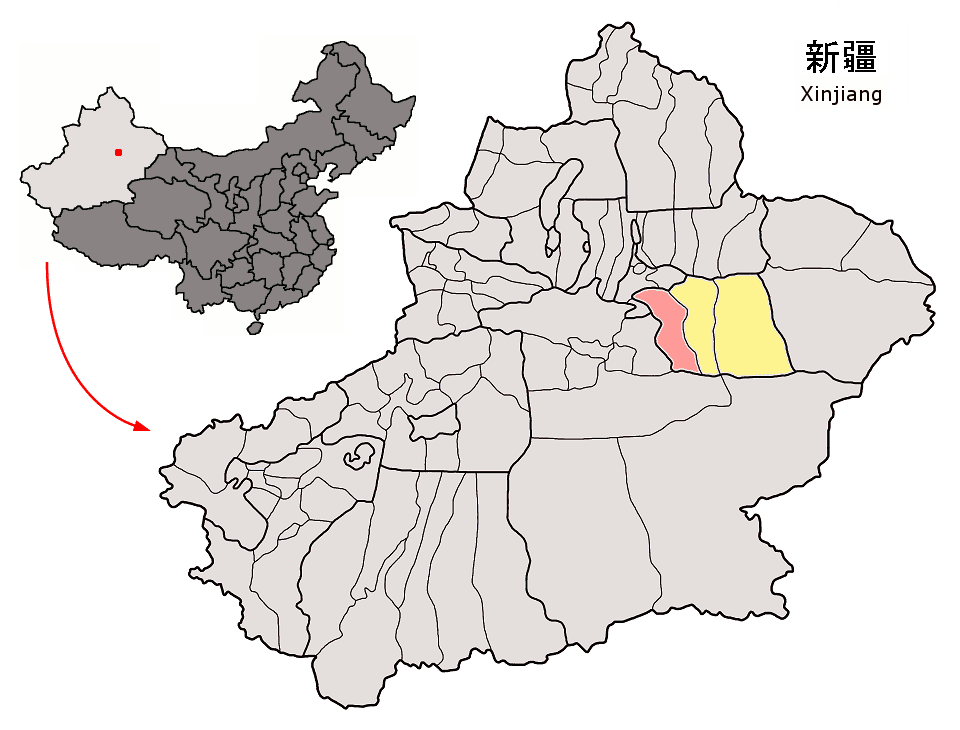
- Location of Toksun County (red) within Turpan City (yellow) and Xinjiang

- Location of the seat in Xinjiang Toksun County (China)
- Coordinates: 42.7833°N 88.6333°E
- Country: China
- Autonomous region: Xinjiang
- Prefecture-level city: Turpan
- County seat: Toksun Town
- Township-level divisions: 7 towns, 1 township

Area
  - County: 16,561 km^{2} (6,394 sq mi)
  - Urban: 29.7 km^{2} (11.5 sq mi)

Population (2020)
  - County: 134,235
  - Density: 8.1055/km^{2} (20.993/sq mi)
  - Urban: 36,891
  - Urban density: 1,240/km^{2} (3,220/sq mi)

Ethnic groups
  - Major ethnic groups: Uyghur - 76.5%
- Time zone: UTC+8 (China Standard (Note: Locals in Xinjiang frequently observe UTC+6 (Xinjiang Time), 2 hours behind Beijing.))
- Postal code: 838100
- Website: tkx.gov.cn (in Chinese)

Toksun County

Uyghur name
- Uyghur: توقسۇن ناھىيىسى
Transcriptions
- Latin Yëziqi: Toqsun Nahiyisi
- Yengi Yeziⱪ: Toⱪsun Naⱨiyisi
- SASM/GNC: Toksun Nahiyisi
- Siril Yëziqi: Тоқсун Наһийиси

Chinese name
- Simplified Chinese: 托克逊县
- Traditional Chinese: 託克遜縣
Transcriptions
Standard Mandarin
- Hanyu Pinyin: Tuōkèxùn Xiàn
- Wade–Giles: Tʻo¹-kʻo⁴-hsün⁴ Hsien⁴

Toksun County is a county in Turpan, Xinjiang Uyghur Autonomous Region, China.

== Name ==
The term 'Toksun' means 'ninety'.

== History ==
The Battle of Toksun took place in this county in July 1933 when Khoja Niyas Hajji, a Uighur leader, defected with his forces to Governor Sheng Shicai. He advanced to Toksun via Dawan Ch'eng, where the Chinese Muslim forces of General Ma Shih-ming achieved victory over Niyas Hajji's forces.

== Geography and Climate ==
Toksun County's location in the bottom of the Turpan Depression and an average rainfall of just 3.9 mm (0.15 in) annually, the least precipitation of any area in China, make it a very hot place during summertime. On July 31, 1964, the highest recorded temperature was 53.3 °C (127.9 °F), which is the highest reliable temperature, recorded during standard conditions anywhere in China. The county is bordered to the south by Yuli County.

Climate data for Toksun, elevation 50 m (160 ft), (1991–2020 normals, extremes 1981–present)
Month	Jan	Feb	Mar	Apr	May	Jun	Jul	Aug	Sep	Oct	Nov	Dec	Year
Record high °C (°F)	12.4 (54.3)	18.6 (65.5)	32.2 (90.0)	42.0 (107.6)	44.3 (111.7)	48.0 (118.4)	48.8 (119.8)	47.4 (117.3)	41.3 (106.3)	35.1 (95.2)	21.9 (71.4)	13.1 (55.6)	48.8 (119.8)
Mean daily maximum °C (°F)	−2.0 (28.4)	7.3 (45.1)	18.1 (64.6)	27.5 (81.5)	33.5 (92.3)	38.6 (101.5)	40.0 (104.0)	38.2 (100.8)	32.1 (89.8)	22.6 (72.7)	10.6 (51.1)	0.0 (32.0)	22.2 (72.0)
Daily mean °C (°F)	−7.9 (17.8)	0.3 (32.5)	10.7 (51.3)	20.1 (68.2)	26.1 (79.0)	31.4 (88.5)	32.6 (90.7)	30.4 (86.7)	23.7 (74.7)	14.0 (57.2)	3.7 (38.7)	−5.5 (22.1)	15.0 (59.0)
Mean daily minimum °C (°F)	−12.4 (9.7)	−5.6 (21.9)	3.9 (39.0)	13.2 (55.8)	19.0 (66.2)	24.4 (75.9)	25.7 (78.3)	23.4 (74.1)	16.7 (62.1)	7.7 (45.9)	−1.3 (29.7)	−9.6 (14.7)	8.8 (47.8)
Record low °C (°F)	−19.8 (−3.6)	−17.1 (1.2)	−11.6 (11.1)	0.0 (32.0)	5.4 (41.7)	11.6 (52.9)	14.6 (58.3)	10.8 (51.4)	4.4 (39.9)	−3.5 (25.7)	−18.2 (−0.8)	−21.8 (−7.2)	−21.8 (−7.2)
Average precipitation mm (inches)	0.5 (0.02)	0.0 (0.0)	0.5 (0.02)	0.4 (0.02)	0.4 (0.02)	2.1 (0.08)	2.0 (0.08)	1.5 (0.06)	0.7 (0.03)	0.8 (0.03)	0.0 (0.0)	0.3 (0.01)	9.2 (0.37)
Average precipitation days (≥ 0.1 mm)	0.7	0.1	0.1	0.3	0.5	1.5	1.9	1.7	0.7	0.3	0.1	0.5	8.4
Average snowy days	2.4	0.5	0	0	0	0	0	0	0	0	0	1.9	4.8
Average relative humidity (%)	60	43	29	26	26	29	33	36	39	47	52	61	40
Mean monthly sunshine hours	152.8	191.6	248.7	276.5	319.1	304.3	299.9	298.6	282.2	255.8	186.8	140.2	2,956.5
Percentage possible sunshine	52	63	66	68	70	67	65	71	77	77	65	50	66
Source: China Meteorological Administrationall-time record high

Climate data for Kumishi Town, Toksun County, elevation 922 m (3,025 ft), (1991–2020 normals)
Month	Jan	Feb	Mar	Apr	May	Jun	Jul	Aug	Sep	Oct	Nov	Dec	Year
Mean daily maximum °C (°F)	−4.2 (24.4)	3.5 (38.3)	13.5 (56.3)	22.6 (72.7)	28.3 (82.9)	32.9 (91.2)	34.8 (94.6)	33.7 (92.7)	27.8 (82.0)	18.7 (65.7)	7.5 (45.5)	−2.0 (28.4)	18.1 (64.6)
Daily mean °C (°F)	−12.2 (10.0)	−4.7 (23.5)	5.1 (41.2)	14.1 (57.4)	20.2 (68.4)	25.2 (77.4)	27.0 (80.6)	25.6 (78.1)	19.4 (66.9)	10.0 (50.0)	−0.3 (31.5)	−9.3 (15.3)	10.0 (50.0)
Mean daily minimum °C (°F)	−18.6 (−1.5)	−12.3 (9.9)	−3.8 (25.2)	5.0 (41.0)	11.3 (52.3)	16.8 (62.2)	18.8 (65.8)	16.9 (62.4)	10.5 (50.9)	1.7 (35.1)	−7.3 (18.9)	−15.5 (4.1)	2.0 (35.5)
Average precipitation mm (inches)	1.2 (0.05)	0.8 (0.03)	1.4 (0.06)	3.1 (0.12)	6.5 (0.26)	12.9 (0.51)	16.2 (0.64)	10.2 (0.40)	4.2 (0.17)	3.6 (0.14)	1.0 (0.04)	0.7 (0.03)	61.8 (2.45)
Average precipitation days (≥ 0.1 mm)	1.7	0.9	0.8	1.5	2.5	5.1	6.8	4.6	2.3	1.2	0.8	1.2	29.4
Average snowy days	4.6	1.9	0.6	0.3	0	0	0	0	0	0	1.2	4.7	13.3
Average relative humidity (%)	66	55	34	28	28	32	36	34	35	42	55	66	43
Mean monthly sunshine hours	189.0	199.5	245.4	268.1	299.6	286.2	287.2	291.7	282.0	260.5	198.8	169.0	2,977
Percentage possible sunshine	64	66	65	66	66	63	63	69	77	78	69	60	67
Source: China Meteorological Administration

== Administrative divisions ==
Toksun County is divided into 7 towns (بازىرى / 镇) and 1 township (يېزىسى / 乡):

Name	Simplified Chinese	Hanyu Pinyin	Uyghur (UEY)	Uyghur Latin (ULY)	Administrative division code	Notes
Towns
Toksun Town	托克逊镇	Tuōkèxùn Zhèn	توقسۇن بازىرى	Toqsun baziri	650422100	
Kümüx Town	库米什镇	Kùmǐshí Zhèn	كۈمۈش بازىرى	Kümüsh baziri	650422101	
Kokjay Town	克尔碱镇	Kè'ěrjiǎn Zhèn	كۆجەي بازىرى	Köjey baziri	650422102	Also Ke'erjian, Köjey; formerly Kujiayi (库加依镇)
Alghuy Town	阿乐惠镇	Ālèhuì Zhèn	ئالغۇي بازىرى	Alghuy baziri	650422103	
Yilanlik Town	伊拉湖镇	Yīlāhú Zhèn	يىلانلىق بازىرى	Yilanliq baziri	650422104	Also Yilahu, Yilanliq, I-la-hu; formerly Yilanlik Township (يىلانلىق يېزىسى / 伊拉湖乡)
Shah Town	夏镇	Xià Zhèn	شاھ بازىرى	Shah baziri	650422105	formerly Shah Township (شاھ يېزىسى / 夏乡)
Bostan Town	博斯坦镇	Bósītǎn Zhèn	بوستان بازىرى	Bostan baziri	650422106	formerly Bostan Township (بوستان يېزىسى / 博斯坦乡)
Townships
Gholbuyi Township	郭勒布依乡	Guōlèbùyī Xiāng	غولبۇيى يېزىسى	Gholbuyi yëzisi	650422201	

== Economy ==
Irrigation in the county is well-developed. Agricultural products of the county include sorghum, wheat, muskmelon, peanuts and cotton. Specialty products include Hami melon and raisins. Industries include electronics, coal, machinery, construction, etc.

== Demographics ==
Historical population
Year	Pop.	±% p.a.
2000	102,150	—
2010	118,221	+1.47%

The proportion of nationalities in Toksun County
Nationality	Percentage
Uyghurs	79.6%
Han People	13.9%
Hui People	6.2%
Kazakhs	0.2%
Others	0.1%
Source of the population statistics :

As of 2015, 96,439 of the 124,040 residents of Toksun County were Uyghur, 18,600 were Han Chinese, 8,539 were Hui and 462 were from other ethnic groups.

According to a 2002 estimate, it then had a population of 110,000.

As of the 2000 Census, the county counted 52,346 males and 49,804 females and 83.65% of the population of the county were from ethnic minority groups.

As of 1999, 77.03% of the population of Toksun County were Uyghur and 15.51% of the population was Han Chinese.

== Transportation ==
- China National Highway 312
- China National Highway 314
- Southern Xinjiang railway

== Notable persons ==
- Tömür Dawamat

== Historical maps ==
Historical English-language maps including Toksun:

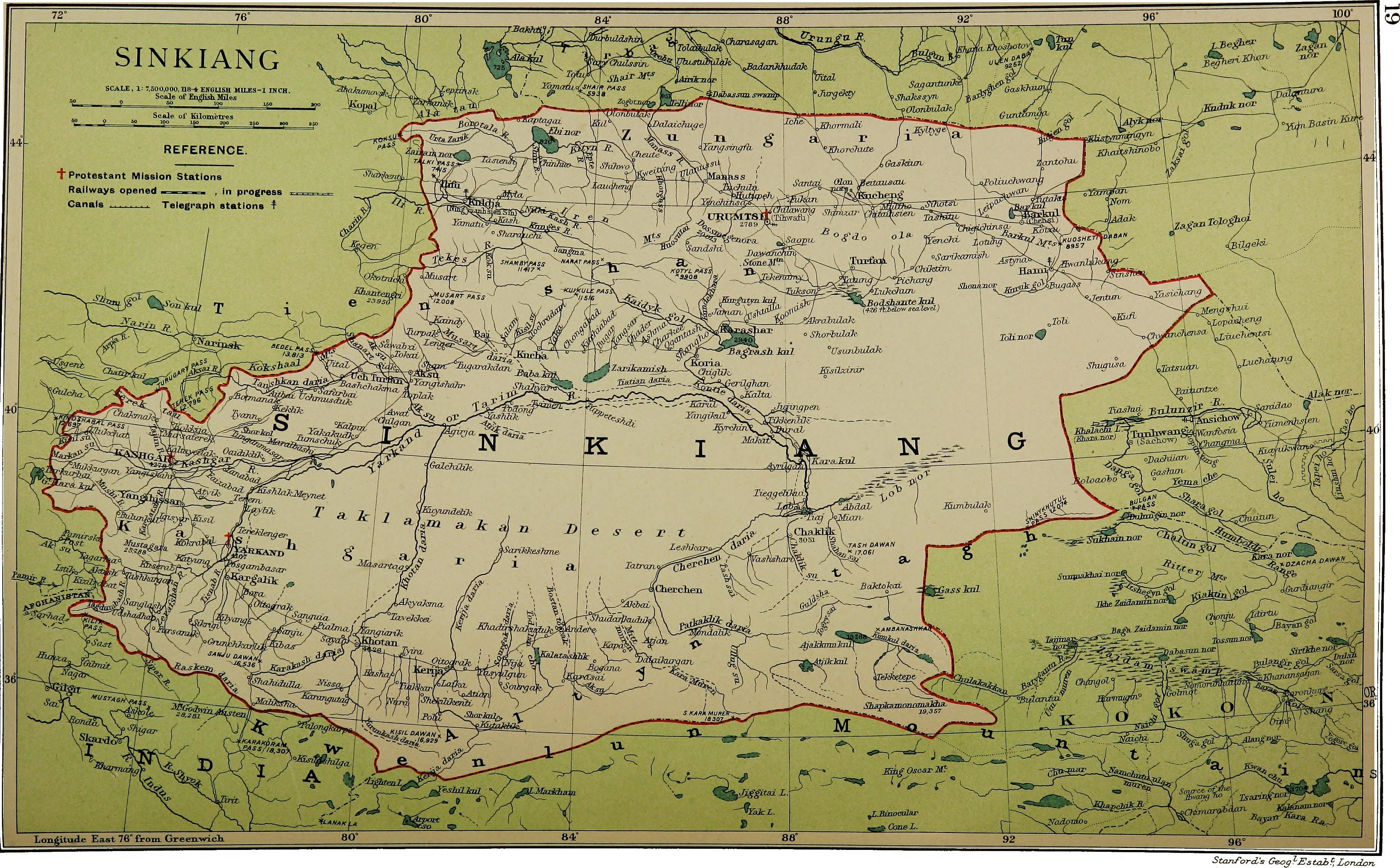
Map including Toksun (labeled as Tukson) (1917)

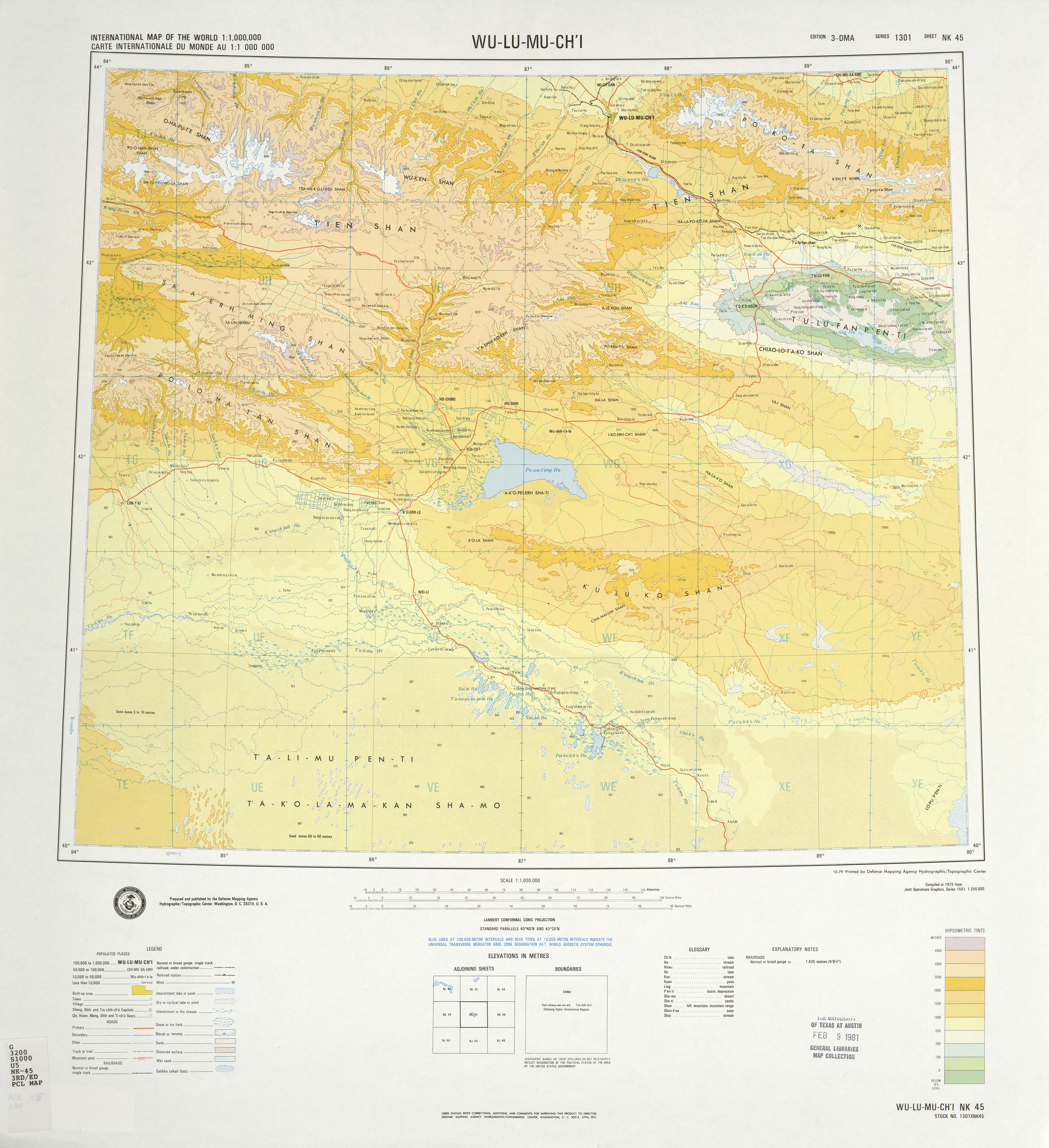
Map including Toksun (labeled as T'O-K'O-HSÜN) and surrounding region from the International Map of the World (DMA, 1975)

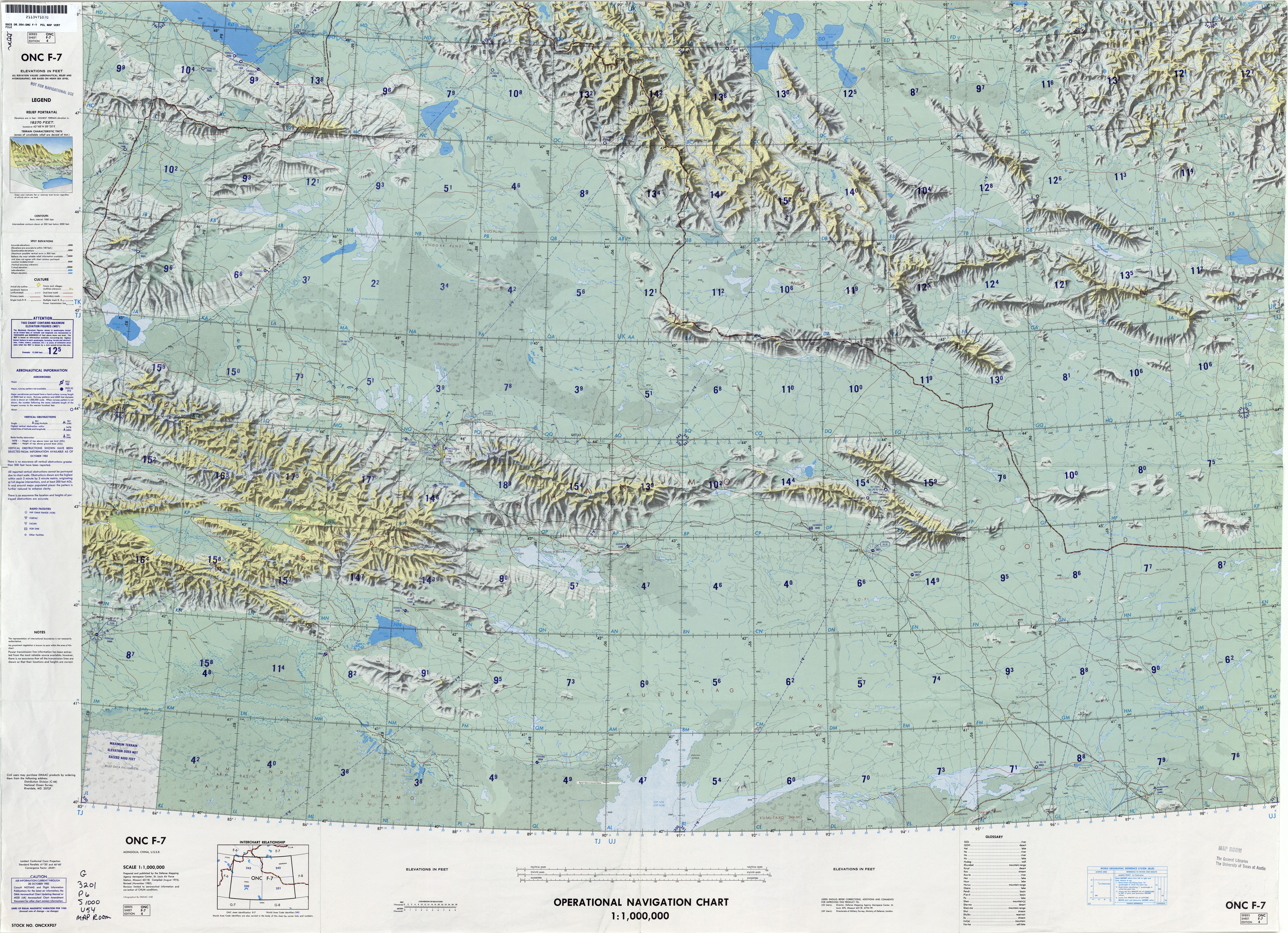
From the Operational Navigation Chart; map including Toksun (DMA, 1982)

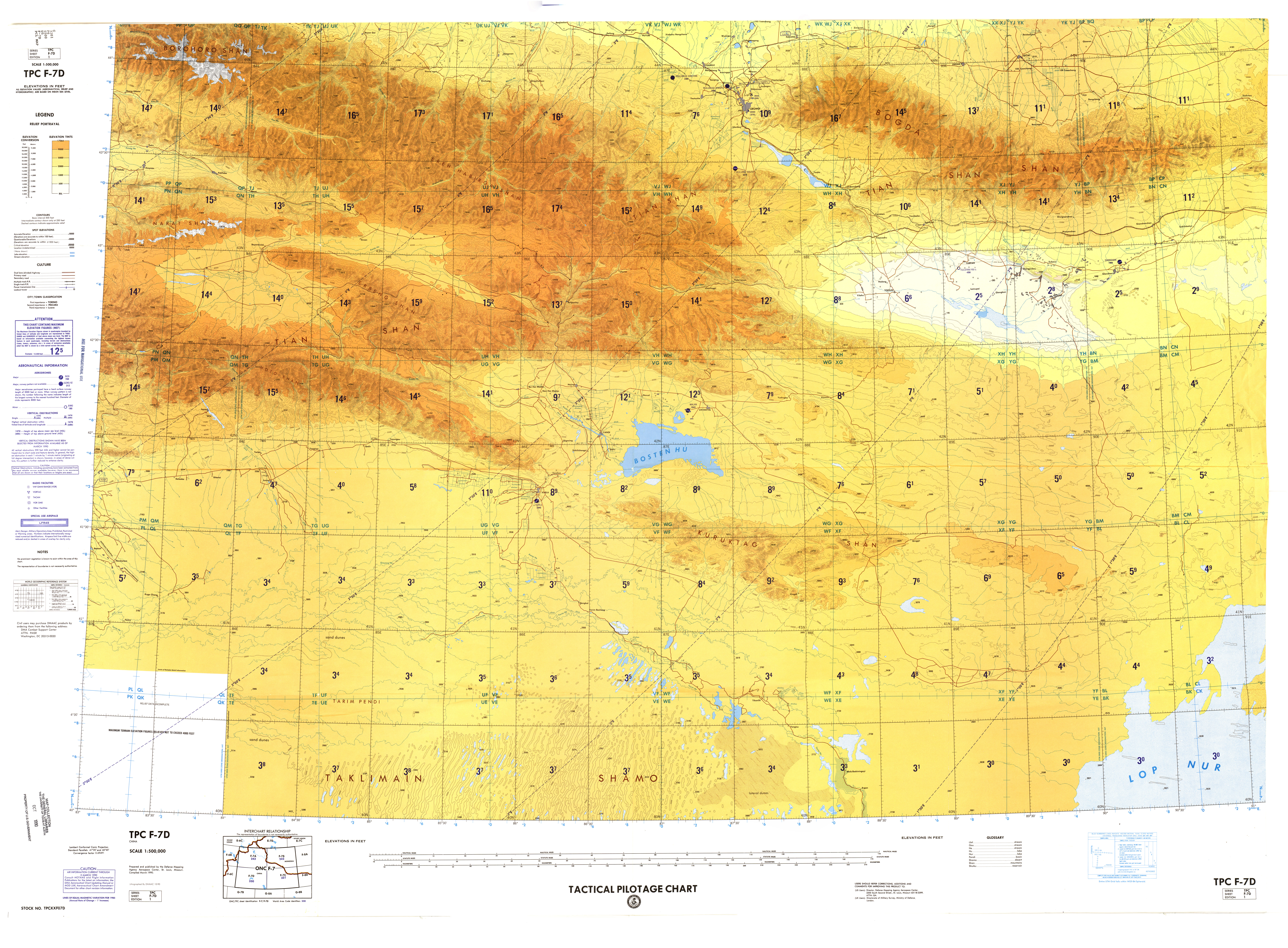
Map including Toksun (DMA, 1990)
