= China National Highway 314 =

Highway in Xinjiang, China

National Highway 314
- 314国道

Route information
- Part of AH4
- Length: 1,948 km (1,210 mi)

Major junctions
- From: Urumqi, Xinjiang
- To: Khunjerab Pass, Xinjiang–Pakistan border Karakoram Highway

Location
- Country: China

Highway system
- National Trunk Highway System; Primary; Auxiliary
← G312	→ G315

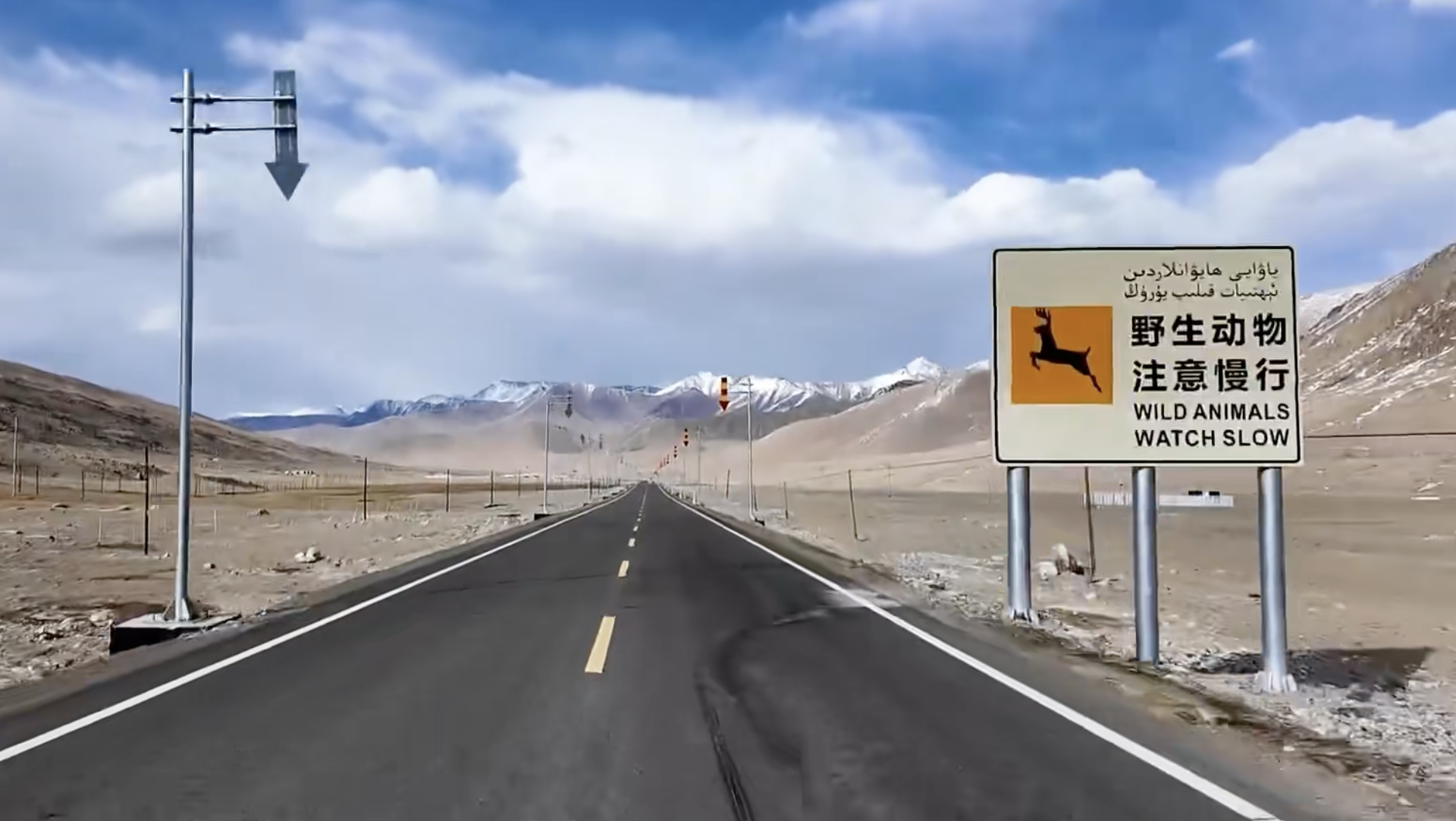
Wildlife road sign on China National Highway 314 bordering Pakistan

China National Highway 314 (G314) runs southwest from Urumqi, Xinjiang towards the Khunjerab Pass, which is on the northern border of the Gilgit–Baltistan territory in Pakistan-administered Kashmir. The highway is 1,948 kilometres (1,210 mi) in length. It goes southeast from Urumqi and south of Toksun it turns west and follows the north side of the Tarim Basin to Kashgar. (Its sister, China National Highway 315, follows the south side of the basin.) From Kashgar, it runs south to Pakistan.

The section between Kashgar and Khunjerab Pass also serves as the Chinese part of Karakoram Highway.

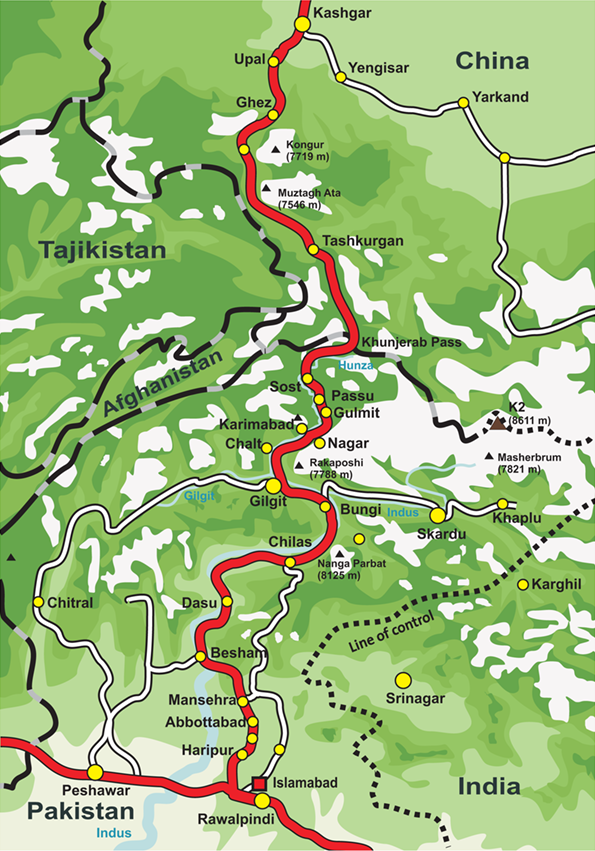
Route of Karakoram Highway.

== Route and distance ==
Route and distance

City	Distance (km)
Urumqi, Xinjiang	0
Toksun, Xinjiang	160
Yanqi, Xinjiang	414
Korla, Xinjiang	468
Luntai, Xinjiang	636
Kuqa County, Xinjiang	746
Xinhe, Xinjiang	789
Wensu, Xinjiang	1001
Aksu, Xinjiang	1013
Kalpin County	
Artux, Kizilsu, Xinjiang	1434
Kashgar, Xinjiang	1480
Shufu, Xinjiang	1499
Bulungkol, Akto County, Kizilsu, Xinjiang	
Taxkorgan, Xinjiang	1802
Khunjerab Pass, Xinjiang	1948

== See also ==
- China National Highways
- Kulma Pass
