= List of Major National Historical and Cultural Sites in Henan =

This list is of Major Sites Protected for their Historical and Cultural Value at the National Level in the Province of Henan, People's Republic of China.

Site	Chinese name	Location	Designation	Image
Longmen Caves	Longmen shiku 龙门石窟	Luoyang	1-37	Upload file
Taishi Que	Taishi que 太室阙	Dengfeng	1-48	Upload file
Shaoshi Que	Shaoshi que 少室阙	Dengfeng	1-49	Upload file
Qimu Que	Qimu que 启母阙	Dengfeng	1-50	Upload file
Songyue Temple Pagoda	Songyue si ta 嵩岳寺塔	Dengfeng; 34°30′06″N 113°00′57″E	1-61	Upload file
Youguo Temple Pagoda	Youguo si ta (tieta) 祐国寺塔(铁塔)	Kaifeng; 34°49′00″N 114°21′54″E	1-69	Upload file
White Horse Temple	Baima si 白马寺	Luoyang; 34°43′26″N 112°35′59″E	1-92	Upload file
Gaocheng Astronomical Observatory	Guanxing tai 观星台	Dengfeng; 34°29′46″N 113°05′50″E	1-97	Upload file
Yangshao Village Site	Yangshao cun yizhi 仰韶村遗址	Mianchi County; 36°18′N 109°06′E	1-138	Upload file
Zhengzhou Shang City	Zhengzhou Shangdai yizhi 郑州商代遗址	Zhengzhou	1-141	Upload file
Yinxu	Yinxu 殷墟	Anyang; 36°08′22″N 114°18′11″E	1-142	Upload file
Capital of Zheng and Han States	Zheng Han gucheng 郑韩故城	Xinzheng	1-148	Upload file
Han–Wei Luoyang	Han Wei Luoyang gucheng 汉魏洛阳故城	Luoyang	1-153	Upload file
Gongxian Caves	Gongxian shiku 巩县石窟	Gongyi	2-11	Upload file
Xiuding Temple Pagoda	Xiuding si ta 修定寺塔	Anyang County	2-16	Upload file
Northern Song Mausoleums	Songling 宋陵	Gongyi	2-58	Upload file
Former Site of the Revolutionary Base of Hubei-Henan-Anhui	E Yu Wan geming genjudi jiudi 鄂豫皖革命根据地旧址	Xin County	3-32	Upload file
Former Site of the Zhongyuan Office of the Central Committee of the Chinese Communist Party	Zhong-Gong Zhongyang Zhongyuan ju juzhi 中共中央中原局旧址	Queshan County	3-37	Upload file
Sheqi Shanshan Assembly Hall	Sheqi Shanshan huiguan 社旗山陕会馆	Sheqi County	3-78	Upload file
Fengxue Temple and Pagoda Forest	Fengxue si ji talin 风穴寺及塔林	Ruzhou	3-108	Upload file
Jingzang Chan Master Pagoda	Jingzang chanshi ta 净藏禅师塔	Dengfeng	3-137	Upload file
Pingliangtai Ancient City	Pingliangtai gucheng yizhi 平粮台古城遗址	Huaiyang County	3-193	Upload file
Erlitou site	Erlitou yizhi 二里头遗址	Yanshi; 34°42′06″N 112°41′49″E	3-197	Upload file
Shixianggou Shangcheng City	Shixianggou Shangcheng yizhi 尸乡沟商城遗址	Yanshi	3-198	Upload file
Sui and Tang Site of Luoyang	Sui Tang Luoyang cheng yizhi 隋唐洛阳城遗址	Luoyang	3-216	Upload file
Site of the Northern Song Capital	Bei Song dongjing cheng yizhi 北宋东京城遗址	Kaifeng	3-218	Upload file
Yuxian Jun Kiln Site	Yuxian Jun yao zhi 禹县钧窑址	Yuzhou	3-227	Upload file
Tomb of Zhang Heng	Zhang Heng mu 张衡墓	Nanyang	3-237	Upload file
Dahuting Han tombs	Dahuting Han mu 打虎亭汉墓	Xinmi	3-239	Upload file
Tomb and Temple of Zhang Zhongjing	Zhang Zhongjing mu ji ci 张仲景墓及祠	Nanyang	3-240	Upload file
Xishan Site	Xishan yizhi 西山遗址	Zhengzhou	4-12	Upload file
Wangchenggang and Yangcheng Site	Wangchenggang ji Yangcheng yizhi 王城岗及阳城遗址	Dengfeng	4-13	Upload file
Youlicheng Site	Youlicheng yizhi 羑里城遗址	Tangyin County 汤阴县	4-14	Upload file
Capital of Cai State	Caiguo gucheng 蔡国故城	Shangcai County 上蔡县	4-28	Upload file
Site of the Jiudian Iron Works	Jiudian yetie yizhi 酒店冶铁遗址	Xiping County 西平县	4-29	Upload file
Qicheng Site	Qicheng yizhi 戚城遗址	Puyang 濮阳市	4-30	Upload file
Guo tombs	Guoguo mudi 虢国墓地	Sanmenxia 三门峡市	4-59	Upload file
Tomb of the Han dynasty King of Liang	Han Liang wang muqun 汉梁王墓群	Yongcheng 永城市	4-64	Upload file
Grave of Prince Lujian	Lujian wang mu 潞简王墓	Xinxiang 新乡市	4-74	Upload file
Temple of the First Patriarch and Pagoda Forest of Shaolin Temple	Chuzu an ji Shaolin si ta lin 初祖庵及少林寺塔林	Dengfeng 登封市	4-89	Upload file
Jidu Temple	Jidu miao 济渎庙	Jiyuan 济源市	4-107	Upload file
Temple of Marquis Wu, Nanyang	Nanyang Wu hou ci 南阳武侯祠	Nanyang 南阳市	4-122	Upload file
Town Walls of Guide	Guide fu cheng qiang 归德府城墙	Shangqiu 商丘市	4-146	Upload file
Taihao Mausoleum	Taihao ling miao 太昊陵庙	Huaiyang County 淮阳县	4-147	Upload file
Bi Gan Temple	Bigan miao 比干庙	Weihui 卫辉市	4-148	Upload file
Kaifeng City Wall	Kaifeng chengqiang 开封城墙	Kaifeng 开封市	4-175	Upload file
Guandi Temple, Zhoukou	Zhoukou Guandi miao 周口关帝庙	Zhoukou 周口市	4-176	Upload file
Neixiang County Government Site	Neixiang xianya 内乡县衙	Neixiang County 内乡县	4-177	Upload file
Lingquan Temple Caves	Lingquan si shiku 灵泉寺石窟	Anyang County 安阳县	4-191	Upload file
Qiantangzhizhai Stone Carvings	Qiantangzhizhai shike 千唐志斋石刻	Xin'an County 新安县	4-197	Upload file
Starting Point of the 25th Army on the Long March	Hong ershiwu jun changzheng chufa di 红二十五军长征出发地	Luoshan County 罗山县	4-236	Upload file
Peiligang Site	Peiligang yizhi 裴李岗遗址	Xinzheng 新郑市	5-64	Upload file
Jiahu Site	Jiahu yizhi 贾湖遗址	Wuyang County 舞阳县; 33°35′00″N 113°42′00″E	5-65	Upload file
Baligang Site	Baligang yizhi 八里岗遗址	Dengzhou 邓州市	5-66	Upload file
Beiyangping Site	Beiyangping yizhi 北阳平遗址	Lingbao 灵宝市	5-67	Upload file
Miaodigou Site	Miaodigou yizhi 庙底沟遗址	Sanmenxia 三门峡市	5-68	Upload file
Dahecun Site	Dahecun yizhi 大河村遗址	Zhengzhou 郑州市	5-69	Upload file
Mengzhuang Site	Mengzhuang yizhi 孟庄遗址	Huixian 辉县市	5-70	Upload file
Guchengzhai Town Site	Guchengzhai chengzhi 古城寨城址	Xinmi 新密市	5-71	Upload file
Fucheng Site	Fucheng yizhi 府城遗址	Jiaozuo 焦作市	5-72	Upload file
Fanguo Gucheng Site	Fanguo gucheng yizhi 番国故城遗址	Gushi County 固始县	5-73	Upload file
Chengyang Site	Chengyang yizhi 城阳城址	Xinyang 信阳市	5-74	Upload file
Xingyang Gucheng	Xingyang gucheng 荥阳故城	Zhengzhou 郑州市	5-75	Upload file
Gongyi Kiln Site	Gongyi yaozhi 巩义窑址	Gongyi 巩义市	5-76	Upload file
Qingliang Temple Ru Kiln Site	Qingliangsi Ru guanyao yizhi 清凉寺汝官窑遗址	Baofeng County 宝丰县	5-77	Upload file
Luyi Taiqinggong Site	Luyi Taiqinggong yizhi 鹿邑太清宫遗址	Luyi County 鹿邑县	5-78	Upload file
Mangshan Tombs	Mangshan lingmu qun 邙山陵墓群	Luoyang 洛阳市	5-171	Upload file
Gongling Mausoleum	Gong ling 恭陵	Yanshi 偃师市	5-172	Upload file
Later Zhou Imperial Tomb	Hou Zhou huangling 后周皇陵	Xinzheng 新郑市	5-173	Upload file
Tomb of Zhu Zaiyu	Zhu Zaiyu mu 朱载堉墓	Qinyang 沁阳市	5-174	Upload file
Baolun Temple Pagoda	Baolun si ta 宝轮寺塔	Sanmenxia 三门峡市	5-338	Upload file
Shanxi-Shaanxi-Gansu Guild Hall	Shan Shaan Gan huiguan 山陕甘会馆	Kaifeng 开封市	5-339	Upload file
Residence of Kang Baiwan	Kang Baiwan zhuangyuan 康百万庄园	Gongyi 巩义市	5-340	Upload file
Sansheng Pagoda of Tianning Temple	Tianning si sansheng ta 天宁寺三圣塔	Qinyang 沁阳市	5-341	Upload file
Miaole Temple Pagoda	Miaole si ta 妙乐寺塔	Wuzhi County 武陟县	5-342	Upload file
Jiaying Temple	Jiaying guan 嘉应观	Wuzhi County 武陟县	5-343	Upload file
Xiaoshang Bridge	Xiaoshang qiao 小商桥	Linying County 临颍县	5-344	Upload file
Nanyang Yamen	Nanyang zhifu yamen 南阳知府衙门	Nanyang 南阳市	5-345	Upload file
Luze Guild Hall	Luze huiguan 潞泽会馆	Luoyang 洛阳市	5-346	Upload file
Daming Temple	Daming si 大明寺	Jiyuan 济源市	5-347	Upload file
Fengxian Temple	Fengxian guan 奉仙观	Jiyuan 济源市	5-348	Upload file
Old Architecture of Jingziguan	Jingziguan gu jianzhuqun 荆紫关古建筑群	Xichuan County 淅川县	5-349	Upload file
Cisheng Temple	Cisheng si 慈胜寺	Wen County 温县	5-350	Upload file
Yue Fei Temple, Tangyin	Tangyin Yue Fei miao 汤阴岳飞庙	Tangyin County 汤阴县	5-351	Upload file
Anyang Tianning Temple Pagoda	Anyang tianning si ta 安阳天宁寺塔	Anyang 安阳市	5-352	Upload file
Mingfu Temple Pagoda	Mingfu si ta 明福寺塔	Hua County 滑县	5-353	Upload file
Huishan temple	Huishan si 会善寺	Dengfeng 登封市	5-354	Upload file
Yongtai Temple Pagoda	Yongtai si ta 永泰寺塔	Dengfeng 登封市	5-355	Upload file
Fawang Temple Pagoda	Fawang si ta 法王寺塔	Dengfeng 登封市	5-356	Upload file
Zhongyue Temple	Zhongyue miao 中岳庙	Dengfeng 登封市	5-357	Upload file
Baiquan	Baiquan 百泉	Huixian 辉县市	5-358	Upload file
Hongqing Temple Grotto	Hongqing Temple Grotto鸿庆寺石窟	Yima 义马市	5-456	Upload file
Xiaonanhai Caves	Xiaonanhai shiku 小南海石窟	Anyang County 安阳县	5-457	Upload file
Dapishan Rock Great Buddha and Stone Carvings	Dapishan moya Dafo ji shike 大丕山摩崖大佛及石刻	Xun County 浚县	5-458	Upload file
Shoushan Stele and Shoushantai	Shoushan bei yu shoushan tai 受禅碑与受禅台	Linying County 临颍县	5-459	Upload file
Tang Stele	Datang songyang guan ji shengde ganying zhi song bei 大唐嵩阳观纪圣德感应之颂碑	Dengfeng 登封市	5-460	Upload file
Tomb of Jiao Yulu	Jiao Yulu lieshi mu 焦裕禄烈士墓	Lankao County 兰考县	5-521	Upload file
Zhijidong Site	Zhijidong yizhi 织机洞遗址	Xingyang 荥阳市	6-126	Upload file
Yangtaisi Site	Yangtaisi yizhi 杨台寺遗址	Zhumadian 驻马店市	6-127	Upload file
Wadian Site	Wadian yizhi 瓦店遗址	Yuzhou 禹州市	6-128	Upload file
Shigu Site	Shigu yizhi 石固遗址	Changge 长葛市	6-129	Upload file
Haojiatai Site	Haojiatai yizhi 郝家台遗址	Luohe 漯河市	6-130	Upload file
Wangyoufang Site	Wangyoufang yizhi 王油坊遗址	Yongcheng 永城市	6-131	Upload file
Lizhuang Site	Lizhuang yizhi 李庄遗址	Zhecheng County 柘城县	6-132	Upload file
Wangwan Site	Wangwan yizhi 王湾遗址	Luoyang 洛阳市	6-133	Upload file
Lutaigang Site	Lutaigang yizhi 鹿台岗遗址	Qi County 杞县	6-134	Upload file
Xinzhai site	Xinzhai yizhi 新砦遗址	Xinmi	6-135	Upload file
Tanghu Site	Tanghu yizhi 唐户遗址	Xinzheng 新郑市	6-136	Upload file
Puchengdian Site	Puchengdian yizhi 蒲城店遗址	Pingdingshan 平顶山市	6-137	Upload file
Dashigucheng Site	Dashigu chengzhi 大师姑城址	Xingyang 荥阳市	6-138	Upload file
Xiaoshuangqiao site	Xiaoshuangqiao yizhi 小双桥遗址	Zhengzhou 郑州市	6-139	Upload file
Capital of Song State	Songguo gucheng 宋国故城	Shangqiu 商丘市	6-140	Upload file
Capital of Wey State	Weiguo gucheng 卫国故城	Qi County 淇县	6-141	Upload file
Capital of Huang State	Huangguo gucheng 黄国故城	Huangchuan County 潢川县	6-142	Upload file
Ruins of Gong City	Gongcheng chengzhi 共城城址	Huixian 辉县市	6-143	Upload file
Capital of Hua State	Huaguo gucheng 滑国故城	Yanshi 偃师市	6-144	Upload file
Ruins of Ye City	Yeyi gucheng 叶邑故城	Ye County 叶县	6-145	Upload file
Capital of Zhi State	Zhiguo gucheng 轵国故城	Jiyuan 济源市	6-146	Upload file
Iron Works of Xiahewan	Xiahewan yetie yizhi 下河湾冶铁遗址	Biyang County 泌阳县	6-147	Upload file
Iron Works of Wangchenggang	Wangchenggang yezhi yizhi 望城岗冶铁遗址	Lushan County 鲁山县	6-148	Upload file
Iron Works of Wafangzhuang	Wafangzhuang yetie yizhi 瓦房庄冶铁遗址	Nanyang 南阳市	6-149	Upload file
Sanyangzhuang	Sanyangzhuang yizhi 三杨庄遗址	Neihuang County 内黄县	6-150	Upload file
Old Town of Shanyang	Shanyang gucheng 山阳故城	Jiaozuo 焦作市	6-151	Upload file
Duandian Kiln Site	Duandian yaozhi 段店窑址	Lushan County 鲁山县	6-152	Upload file
Altar of Empress Wu Zetian	Da Zhou fengsitan yizhi 大周封祀坛遗址	Dengfeng 登封市	6-153	Upload file
Site of Bacun Kiln Site	Bacun yaozhi 扒村窑址	Yuzhou 禹州市	6-154	Upload file
Dangyangyu Kiln Site	Dangyangyu yaozhi 当阳峪窑址	Xiuwu County 修武县	6-155	Upload file
Zhanggongxiang Kiln Site	Zhanggongxiang yaozhi 张公巷窑址	Ruzhou 汝州市	6-156	Upload file
Ying Tombs	Yingguo mu di 应国墓地	Pingdingshan 平顶山市	6-262	Upload file
Tomb of Xu Shen	Xu Shen mu 许慎墓	Luohe 漯河市	6-263	Upload file
Tomb of Han Yu	Han Yu mu 韩愈墓	Mengzhou 孟州市	6-264	Upload file
Tomb of Fan Zhongyan	Fan Zhongyan mu 范仲淹墓	Yichuan County 伊川县	6-265	Upload file
Tomb of Ouyang Xiu	Ouyang Xiu mu 欧阳修墓	Xinzheng 新郑市	6-266	Upload file
Tomb of Li Jie	Li Jie mu 李诫墓	Xinzheng 新郑市	6-267	Upload file
Faxing Temple Pagoda	Faxing si ta 法行寺塔	Ruzhou 汝州市	6-621	Upload file
Ancestral Temple and Grave of the three Su	San Su ci he mu 三苏祠和墓	Jia County 郏县	6-622	Upload file
Yanzhuang Shenshou Temple Pagoda	Yanzhuang Shengshou si ta 阎庄圣寿寺塔	Sui County 睢县	6-623	Upload file
Qianming Temple Pagoda	Qianming si ta 乾明寺塔	Yanling County 鄢陵县	6-624	Upload file
Sizhou Temple Pagoda	Sizhou si ta 泗洲寺塔	Tanghe County 唐河县	6-625	Upload file
Weishi Xingguo Temple Pagoda	Weishi Xingguo si ta 尉氏兴国寺塔	Weishi County 尉氏县	6-626	Upload file
Home of the Two Cheng	Liang Cheng guli 两程故里	Song County 嵩县	6-627	Upload file
Shangshui Shousheng Temple Pagoda	Shangshui shousheng si ta 商水寿圣寺塔	Shangshui County 商水县	6-628	Upload file
Eching Temple	Echeng shi 鄂城寺	Nanyang 南阳市	6-629	Upload file
Chaizhuang Yanqing Temple Pagoda	Chaizhuang yanqing si ta 柴庄延庆寺塔	Jiyuan 济源市	6-630	Upload file
Shengguo Temple Pagoda	Shengguo si ta 胜果寺塔	Xiuwu County 修武县	6-631	Upload file
Baoyan Temple Pagoda	Baoyan si ta 宝严寺塔	Xiping County 西平县	6-632	Upload file
Chongfa Temple Pagoda	Chongfa si ta 崇法寺塔	Yongcheng 永城市	6-633	Upload file
Jia County Confucian Temple	Jia xian wenmiao 郏县文庙	Jia County 郏县	6-634	Upload file
Baijia Rock Temple Pagoda	Baijia yan si ta 百家岩寺塔	Xiuwu County 修武县	6-635	Upload file
Qinyang Beida Mosque	Qinyang Beida si 沁阳北大寺	Qinyang 沁阳市	6-636	Upload file
Ye County Government Office	Ye xian xianya 叶县县衙	Ye County 叶县	6-637	Upload file
Luoyang Zhougong Temple	Luoyang Zhou gong miao 洛阳周公庙	Luoyang 洛阳市	6-638	Upload file
Guanlin	Guanlin 关林	Luoyang 洛阳市	6-639	Upload file
Baiyun Temple	Baiyun si 白云寺	Huixian 辉县市	6-640	Upload file
Xinzheng Xuanyuan Temple	Xinzheng Xuanyuan miao 新郑轩辕庙	Xinzheng 新郑市	6-641	Upload file
Thousand Buddha Pavilion	Qianfo ge 千佛阁	Wuzhi County 武陟县	6-642	Upload file
Yangtai Palace	Yangtai gong 阳台宫	Jiyuan 济源市	6-643	Upload file
Xuchang Wenfeng Pagoda	Xuchang Wenfeng ta 许昌文峰塔	Xuchang 许昌市	6-644	Upload file
Wangjinglou	Wangjing lou 望京楼	Weihui 卫辉市	6-645	Upload file
Xiangyan Temple	Cangfang xiangyan si 仓房香严寺	Xichuan County 淅川县; 32°46′50″N 111°26′04″E	6-646	Upload file
Wuying Pagoda	Wuying ta 悟颖塔	Runan County 汝南县	6-647	Upload file
Fusheng Temple Pagoda	Fusheng si ta 福胜寺塔	Dengzhou 邓州市	6-648	Upload file
Henan Confucian Temple	Henan fu wenmiao 河南府文庙	Luoyang 洛阳市	6-649	Upload file
Zushi Temple	Zushi miao 祖师庙	Luoyang 洛阳市	6-650	Upload file
Luoyang Shanxi-Shaanxi Guild Hall	Luoyang Shan Shaan huiguan 洛阳山陕会馆	Luoyang 洛阳市	6-651	Upload file
Ruzhou Confucian Temple	Ruzhou wenmiao 汝州文庙	Ruzhou 汝州市	6-652	Upload file
Zhuxian Community Mosque	Zhuxian zhen qingzhensi 朱仙镇清真寺	Kaifeng 开封县	6-653	Upload file
Kaifeng Dongda Mosque	Kaifeng Dongda si 开封东大寺	Kaifeng 开封县	6-654	Upload file
Ancestral Temple of Cheng Yuanguang	Cheng Yuanguang zu ci 陈元光祖祠	Gushi County 固始县	6-655	Upload file
Taikang Confucian Temple	Taikang wenmiao 太康文庙	Taikang County 太康县	6-656	Upload file
Qingtian He Cliffs	Qingtian He moya 青天河摩崖	Bo'ai County 博爱县	6-835	Upload file
Ximing Temple Zaoxiang Stele	Ximing si zaoxiang bei 西明寺造像碑	Xinxiang County 新乡县	6-836	Upload file
Shengxian Taizi Stele	Shengxian taizi bei 升仙太子碑	Yanshi 偃师市	6-837	Upload file
Chongtang Temple Sculptures	Chongtang guan zaoxiang 崇唐观造像	Dengfeng 登封市	6-838	Upload file
Yuan Cishan Stele	Yuan Cishan bei 元次山碑	Lushan County 鲁山县	6-839	Upload file
Yunmengshan Cliffs	Yunmengshan moya 云梦山摩崖	Qi County 淇县	6-840	Upload file
Bi'an Temple Stele	Bi'an si bei 彼岸寺碑	Luohe 漯河市	6-841	Upload file
Liubei Temple Pagoda	Liubei si bei 刘碑寺碑	Dengfeng 登封市	6-842	Upload file
Tangwugong Stele	Tangwu gong bei 唐兀公碑	Puyang County 濮阳县	6-843	Upload file
Deng Yingchao Family Home	Deng Yingchao zuju 邓颖超祖居	Guangshan County 光山县	6-982	Upload file
Former Residence of Liu Qingxia	Liu Qingxia guju 刘青霞故居	Kaifeng 开封市	6-983	Upload file
Former Site of the Henan Preparatory School for Study Abroad	Henan liuxue Ou-Mei yubei xuexiao jiuzhi 河南留学欧美预备学校旧址	Kaifeng 开封市	6-984	Upload file
Former Site of the Lütan School	Lütan xuexiao jiuzhi 吕潭学校旧址	Fugou County 扶沟县	6-985	Upload file
Headquarters of the 25th Army of the Chinese Red Army of Workers and Peasants	Zhongguo gong-nong hongjun di-ershiwu jun silingbu jiuzhi 中国工农红军第二十五军司令部旧址	Xin County 新县	6-986	Upload file
Former Office of the Eighth March Army in Luoyang	Balujun Luoyang banshichu jiuzhi 八路军洛阳办事处旧址	Luoyang 洛阳市	6-987	Upload file
Site of the Revolutionary Base in Hebei-Shandong-Henan	Ji-Lu-Yu bianqu geming genjudi 冀鲁豫边区革命根据地旧址	Fan County 范县	6-988	Upload file
Former Satellite People's Commune in Cuoyashan	Cuoya shan weixing renmin gongshe jiuzhi 嵖岈山卫星人民公社旧址	Suiping County 遂平县	6-989	Upload file
Red Flag Canal	Hongqi qu 红旗渠	Linzhou 林州市; 36°21′12″N 113°45′34″E	6-990	Upload file
Monument and Memorial Hall for the 7 February Peking-Hankou Railway Workers Strike	Zhengzhou erqi bagong jinianta he jiniantang 郑州二七罢工纪念塔和纪念堂	Zhengzhou 郑州市	6-991	Upload file

== See also ==
- Principles for the Conservation of Heritage Sites in China
