= Hejiazhuang railway station =

Railway station in Henan, China

Hejiazhuang railway station 贺家庄站

General information
- Location: Yadi Subdistrict, Hubin, Sanmenxia, Henan; China
- Coordinates: 34°45′12.6″N 111°12′4.0″E
- Operated by: CR Zhengzhou
- Line: Longhai railway

Other information
- Station code: HEF (Telegraph); HJZ (Pinyin); 39263 (Station)

History
- Opened: 1927

Services
Preceding station	China Railway	Following station
Sanmenxia towards Lianyungang East	Longhai railway	Zhangjiawan towards Lanzhou
Location

Hejiazhuang railway station (Chinese: 贺家庄站) is a railway station in Yadi Subdistrict, Hubin, Sanmenxia, Henan, China, operated by CR Zhengzhou. It opened its services in 1927.

The station handles passenger services on the Longhai railway line. On 28 June 1989, a freight car traveling from Sanmenxia railway station to Hejiazhuang station had a brake failure and ran out-of-control. Both lines of transit were temporarily closed due to the incident but were opened by June 30.
