= Xiyan =

Xiyan or Xi Yan may refer to:

- Western Yan (384–394), a Xianbei state in North China during the Sixteen Kingdoms period
- The Wedding Banquet, a 1993 film by Ang Lee
- Xi Yan, a character from David Henry Hwang's play Chinglish

== Places in China ==
- Xiyan, Guangxi (西燕), a town in Shanglin County, Guangxi
- Xiyan, Hebei (西演), a town in Gaoyang County, Hebei
- Xiyan, Hunan (西岩), a town in Chengbu Miao Autonomous County, Hunan
- Xiyan, Yu County (西烟), a town in Yu County, Shanxi
- Xiyan Township, Henan, a township in Lingbao, Henan
- Xiyan Township, Shanxi (西墕乡), a township in Taiyuan, Shanxi
