= Yuandian =

Yuandian may refer to:

- The Beginning (TV series), a 2006 Malaysian-Singaporean TV series
- Yuandian Town (原店镇), a town in Sanmenxia, Henan, China
- Yuandian Hui Ethnic Township (袁店回族乡), a township in Fangcheng County, Henan, China
