= Gaoyang =

Gaoyang (高陽) may refer to:

- Gaoyang dialect (高陽方言), a dialect of Cantonese
- Zhuanxu, or Gaoyang, legendary monarch of ancient China
- Gao Yang, personal name of Emperor Wenxuan of Northern Qi

== Places in China ==
- Gaoyang County, Hebei
- Gaoyang Township, Shunchang County, Fujian

Towns

- Gaoyang, Chongqing, in Yunyang County
- Gaoyang, Hebei, seat of Gaoyang County
- Gaoyang, Henan, in Qi County, Kaifeng
- Gaoyang, Shayang County, Hubei
- Gaoyang, Xingshan County, Hubei
- Gaoyang, Shaanxi, in Pucheng County
- Gaoyang, Shanxi, in Xiaoyi
- Gaoyang, Sichuan, in Wangcang County

== See also ==
- Gao Yan (disambiguation)
- Goyang, a city in Gyeonggi Province, South Korea
