= Zhao Haiyan =

Chinese politician

- 赵海燕

Communist Party Secretary of Sanmenxia
- In office August 2015 – August 2016
- Preceded by: Yang Shuping
- Succeeded by: Liu Nanchang

Mayor of Sanmenxia
- In office July 2011 – August 2015
- Preceded by: Yang Shuping
- Succeeded by: An Wei

Communist Party Secretary of Yima
- In office March 2001 – August 2002
- Succeeded by: Zhang Yinghuan

Magistrate of Mianchi County
- In office May 2000 – March 2001

Personal details
- Born: February 1963 (age 63) Huixian, Henan, China
- Party: Chinese Communist Party
- Spouse: Zhang Jin
- Education: China University of Political Science and Law; Tsinghua University

Chinese name
- Traditional Chinese: 趙海燕
- Simplified Chinese: 赵海燕
Transcriptions
Standard Mandarin
- Hanyu Pinyin: Zhào Haǐyàn

Zhao Haiyan (Chinese: 赵海燕; born February 1963) is a former Chinese politician who spent most of her career in her home-province Henan. She was investigated by the Chinese Communist Party's anti-graft agency in July 2016. Previously she served as Communist Party Secretary of Sanmenxia.

== Biography ==
Zhao was born in February 1963 in Huixian, Henan. She entered the China University of Political Science and Law in September 1980, majoring in law, where she graduated in July 1984. After graduation, she entered politics as a civil servant in Henan Provincial Women's Federation. Zhao also studied at Tsinghua University from September 2005 to July 2007 as a part-time student.

In October 1998 she was promoted to become deputy party chief of Mianchi County, and concurrently served as magistrate in May 2000.

She was party chief of Yima in March 2001, and held that office until August 2002.

In August 2002, she was appointed the vice-mayor of Xinxiang, she remained in that position until October 2008, when she was transferred to Jiaozuo and appointed vice-mayor there.

She became deputy party chief of Sanmenxia in May 2011, and concurrently served as mayor of the city in July 2011, in August 2015 she was promoted again to become party chief, the top political position in the city, and served until August 2016. During her tenure, although she has held the position for only one year, she adjusted over one hundred positions of her subordinates. Some of the people who were close to her were promoted. So the folk called her "Secretary of Selling Official Position" (卖官书记).

=== Downfall ===
On July 16, 2016, Zhao was suspected of "serious violations of discipline", in a one-sentence statement issued by the ruling Communist Party's corruption watchdog body, the Central Commission for Discipline Inspection (CCDI). On August 24, she was removed from public office. On December 25, she was removed from membership of the National People's Congress, the national legislature of the People's Republic of China.

On June 6, 2018, Zhao's husband Zhang Jin (张锦; born 1956), who formerly served as director of the Bureau of Geology and Mineral Exploration in Henan, was put under investigation for alleged "serious violations of discipline and laws."

On November 30, 2018, she was sentenced 11 years in prison for bribery. She was charged with accepting bribes worth 10.25 million yuan by the Intermediate People's Court of Zhengzhou.

Government offices
Preceded by Yang Shuping (杨树平)	Mayor of Sanmenxia; 2011–2015	Succeeded by An Wei (安伟)
Party political offices
Preceded by Yang Shuping (杨树平)	Communist Party Secretary of Sanmenxia; 2015–2016	Succeeded by Liu Nanchang (刘南昌)
