= Yima railway station =

Railway station in Yima, Henan, China

Yima 义马

General information
- Location: Yima, Sanmenxia, Henan; China
- Coordinates: 34.7223°N 111.9066°E
- Operator: CR Zhengzhou
- Line: Longhai railway

Other information
- Station code: 39209 (TMIS code); YMF (telegraph code); YMA (Pinyin code)
- Classification: Class 2 station (二等站)

History
- Opened: 1915

Services
Preceding station	China Railway	Following station
Xin'anxian towards Lianyungang East	Longhai railway	Mianchi towards Lanzhou
Location
- Location within Henan Location within China

Yima railway station (Chinese: 义马站) is a station on Longhai railway in Yima, Sanmenxia, Henan.

== History ==
The station was established in 1915.
