= Hou Youtang =

Chinese paleontologist

- Born: 侯祐堂; May 23, 1919; Gaoyang County, Hebei Province, China
- Died: January 18, 2010 (aged 90); Nanjing, China
- Occupation: Palaeontologist
- Notable work: Fossil Ostracoda of China
- Spouse: Yang Jingzhi (married 1949)
- Children: 2

Hou Youtang (Note: In this Chinese name, the family name is Hou.) (Chinese: 侯祐堂, May 23, 1919 – January 18, 2010) was a Chinese stratigraphic paleontologist and ostracodologist and a member of the Chinese Communist Party. She was a pioneer in micropaleontology research in China and the first Chinese scholar to work on Ostracoda fossils. She is also noted for her major contributions to the oil and gas industry in China.

== Life and career ==
Hou Youtang was born in Hexi village, Gaoyang County in the Hebei Province to renowned Chinese paleontologist Hou Defeng. She finished middle school in 1935 and high school in 1939. From 1940 to 1944, she studied at the Department of Geology of Chongqing University. After receiving her bachelor's degree, she worked at the Sichuan Metallurgical and Geological Exploration Bureau of the Chengdu Geological Survey Institute before teaching at Ginling College in 1946. At first, she was recommended by her father's colleagues to teach at the institute, but eventually started as a teaching assistant, as her father thought she lacked experience ("No, she lacks experience. She can only work as an assistant."). Afterwards, she worked at the library of the former Chinese Academy of Sciences building, now Nanjing Institute of Geology and Palaeontology, until 1950. Hou joined the Nanjing Institute of Geology and Paleontology of the Chinese Academy of Sciences as a researcher in 1951, retiring in 1989. Throughout this period, she was the only female faculty.

In September 1956, Hou joined the Chinese Communist Party and was recognized by the party as a National March 8th Red-Banner Holder. As a party member, she served on the National People's Congress as the Jiangsu representative and also as the Jiangsu and Nanjing representative, respectively, on the All-China Women's Federation. She was also part of the Central Commission for Discipline Inspection.

Hou married Chinese paleontologist Yang Jingzhi in 1949. They had two children. She died of illness in 2010 at Nanjing.

== Legacy ==
One year after her death, the journal Acta Micropalaeontologica Sinica published a special issue in memory of Dr. Hou. Her legacy can be divided into two parts: her work on ostracode and her influence on the early development of the fossil fuel industry in China.

=== Ostracoda research ===
Hou's 1953 article "Late Ordovician Ostracoda Fossils in the Liaoning Province" 《辽东省下奥陶纪介形类化石》 was the first academic research paper on Ostracoda published by a Chinese scholar. She is known for her co-edited two-part volume "Fossil Ostracoda of China" and for describing multiples species of ostracode. Her major publications won multiple prizes, including an award from the 1978 National Science Conference and second and forth class awards from the 1982 National Natural Science Prize.

=== Gas and oil exploration ===
Hou is noted for her involvement in dozens of major oil fields and geological target zones. Her edited volume "Tertiary Palaeontology of North Continental Shelf of South China Sea," a publication of the South Sea Branch of China National Petroleum Corporation, was particularly influential in coastal oil and gas exploration. She has trained multiple students and workers in oil fields and plants, conducting research and leading teams into her late 60s. In 1978, she carried out research at the Lenghu plant in Qinghai Province and conducted field work at the Huatugou area in the Gansu Province. The latter resulted in the formal collaboration between the Nanjing Institute of Geology and Palaeontology and the QingHai Petroleum Administration. In the 1980s, she led field work and trained students at Daqing Oil Field and Shengli Oil Field. Since she transitioned her research focus from Paleozoic marine strata to terrestrial Mesozoic and Cenozoic strata after joining the communist party, some considered her shift a patriotic move to assist national gas and oil exploration.

== Major publications ==
- "Fossil Ostracoda of China"《中国介形类化石》(Vol. 1 Superfamilies Cypridacea and Darwinulacea, 2002), published by China Science Publishing & Media, Hou Youtang at Google Books
- "Fossil Ostracoda of China"《中国介形类化石》(Vol. 2 Superfamilies Cypridacea and Cytherellidae, 2007), published by China Science Publishing & Media, Hou Youtang at Google Books
- "Creataceous : Quaternary ostracode fauna from Jiangsu"《江苏地区白垩纪 - 第四纪介形类动物群》(1982), co-published by the Geological Publishing House, Beijing, China, Hou Youtang at Google Books
- "Tertiary Palaeontology of North Continental Shelf of South China Sea" 《中国南海北部大陆架第三纪古生物图册》(1981), South Sea Branch of China National Petroleum Corporation, published by Guangdong Science and Technology Press, Hou Youtang at Google Books and Hou Youtang at Google Books
- "Early tertiary ostracode fauna from the coastal region of Bohai"《渤海沿岸地区早第三纪介形类》(1978), the Research Institute of Petroleum Exploration and Development, China, Hou Youtang at Google Books
- "The Cretaceous－Tertiary ostracods from the marginal region of the Yangtze-Han River Plain in central Hubei"《江汉平原边缘地区白垩纪 - 第三纪介形类动物群》(1978), published by the Nanjing Institute of Geology and Palaeonotology, Nanjing, China
