= Chuankou Township, Henan =

Chuankou Township 川口乡
- Township
- Location in Henan
- Coordinates: 34°31′19″N 110°57′00″E
- Country: People's Republic of China
- Province: Henan
- Prefecture-level city: Sanmenxia
- County-level city: Lingbao
- Elevation: 444 m (1,457 ft)
- Time zone: UTC+8 (China Standard)
- Area code: 0398

Chuankou (Chinese: 川口; pinyin: Chuānkǒu; lit. 'river mouth') is a township of Lingbao, in western Henan province, China, located 5 kilometres (3.1 mi) east of downtown Lingbao and served by China National Highway 209. As of 2011, it has 24 villages under its administration.
