= LBF =

LBF or lbf may refer to:

- Lingbao railway station (China Railway telegraph code: LBF), a railway station in Sanmenxia, Henan, China
- North Platte Regional Airport (IATA and FAA LID: LBF), a public airport serving North Platte in Lincoln County, Nebraska
- Tinani language (ISO 639-3: lbf), a Sino-Tibetan language spoken in the Indian state of Himachal Pradesh and in western Tibet
