= Huaguo =

Huaguo may refer to:

- State of Hua (Hephthalite), name of the Hephthalites in Chinese chronicles
- Hua (state) (? – 627 BC), a state in China destroyed by the state of Qin
- Mount Huaguo, fictional mountain where the Monkey King resides
