= Mianchi railway station =

Railway station in Sanmenxia, China

Mianchi 渑池

General information
- Location: Mianchi County, Sanmenxia, Henan; China
- Coordinates: 34°45′16″N 111°46′45″E
- Operator: CR Zhengzhou
- Line: Longhai railway

Other information
- Station code: 39221 (TMIS code); MCF (telegraph code); MCH (Pinyin code)
- Classification: Class 2 station (二等站)

History
- Opened: 1915

Services
Preceding station	China Railway	Following station
Yima towards Lianyungang East	Longhai railway	Sanmenxia towards Lanzhou
Location
- Location within Henan Location within China

Mianchi railway station (Chinese: 渑池站) is a station on Longhai railway in Mianchi County, Sanmenxia, Henan.

== History ==
The station was established in 1915.
