= Sanmenxia railway station =

Railway station in Sanmenxia, China

Sanmenxia 三门峡
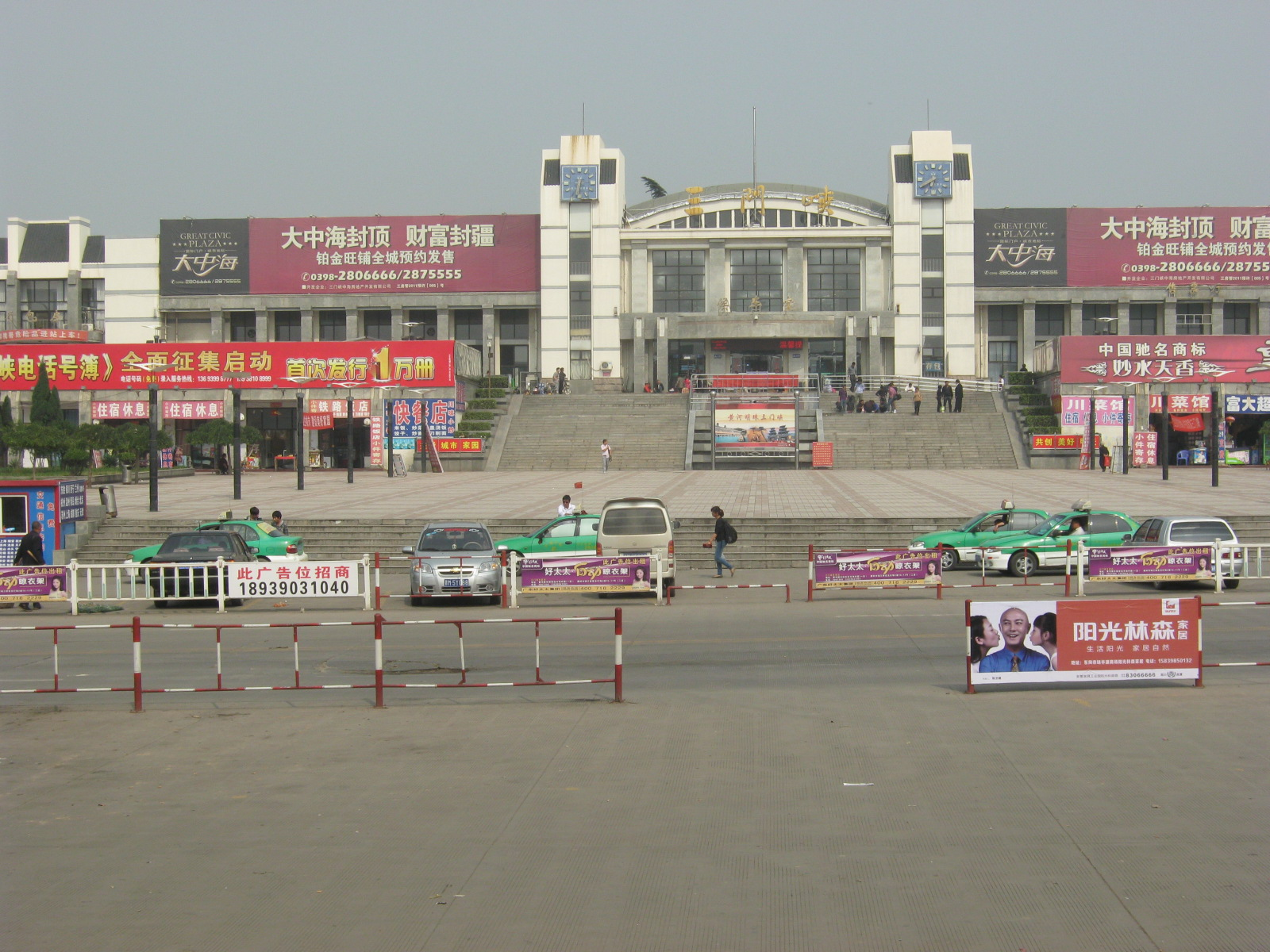

General information
- Location: Hubin District, Sanmenxia, Henan; China
- Coordinates: 34°45′41″N 111°13′37″E
- Operator: CR Zhengzhou
- Line: Longhai railway

Other information
- Station code: 39254 (TMIS code); SMF (telegraph code); SMX (Pinyin code)
- Classification: Class 2 station (二等站)

History
- Opened: 1927
- Former names: Huixing Town (Chinese: 会兴镇)

Services
Preceding station	China Railway	Following station
Mianchi towards Lianyungang East	Longhai railway	Sanmenxia West towards Lanzhou
Location
- Location within Henan Location within China

Sanmenxia railway station (Chinese: 三门峡站) is a station on Longhai railway in Hubin District, Sanmenxia, Henan.

== History ==
The station was established in 1927.

== See also ==
- Sanmenxia West railway station
- Sanmenxia South railway station, a high-speed railway station on Zhengzhou–Xi'an High-Speed Railway
