= Beida Mosque =

Mosque in Qinyang, Henan, China

- 北大寺
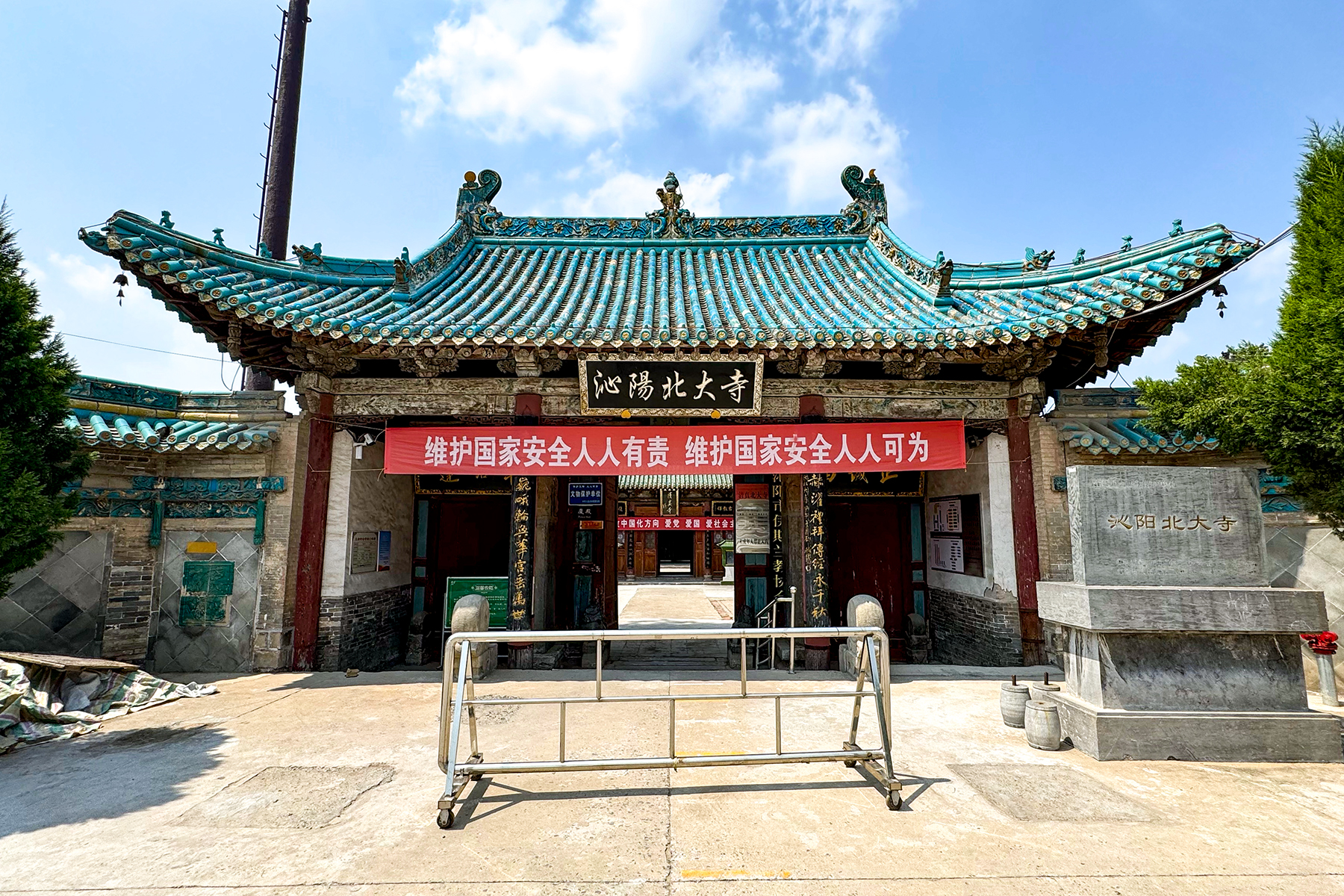

- Location of the mosque in Henan

Religion
- Affiliation: Sunni Islam
- Ecclesiastical or organizational status: Mosque
- Status: Active

Location
- Location: Qinyang, Henan
- Country: China
- Interactive map of Beida Mosque
- Coordinates: 35°05′39″N 112°56′34″E

Architecture
- Type: Mosque
- Style: Chinese
- Established: Zhizheng period (1341–1368)
- Completed: 1887 (reconstruction)
- Interior area: 3,100 m^{2} (33,000 sq ft)

Major cultural heritage sites under national-level protection
- Official name: Qinyang Beida Mosque 沁阳北大寺
- Type: Cultural
- Criteria: Religion
- Designated: May 2006
- Reference no.: 6-636

The Beida Mosque (Chinese: 北大寺; pinyin: Běidà Sì) is a mosque located in Qinyang, in the Henan province of China. It is the largest architectural complex of mosque in the Central Plains.

== History ==
According to the Restoration of Mosque (重修清真寺记), the mosque was established in the Zhizheng period (r. 1341–1368) of the Yuan dynasty (1271–1368) and rebuilt in 1561, namely the 40th year of Jiajing period (r. 1522–1566) of the Ming dynasty (1368–1644). The mosque turned to ashes by a devastating fire in 1628, and was restored in 1631, during the reign of Chongzhen Emperor. In the Qing dynasty (1644–1911), it was completely destroyed in the earthquake during the ruling of Daoguang Emperor (r. 1821–1850), and was rebuilt on its original site in 1887, in the 13th year of Guangxu period (r. 1875–1908).

In May 2006, it was listed as a Chinese major cultural heritage site.

== Architecture ==
The mosque was built in the Chinese architectural style and occupies a total area of 3,100 square metres (33,000 sq ft). It is divided into a male mosque and a female mosque. It consists of prayer hall, pavilion, wing room and other facilities.

== See also ==
Beida Mosque
- Simplified Chinese: 北大寺
Transcriptions
Standard Mandarin
- Hanyu Pinyin: Běidà Sì

- Islam in China
- List of mosques in China
- List of Major National Historical and Cultural Sites in Henan
