= Lingbao railway station =

Railway station in Sanmenxia, China

Lingbao 灵宝
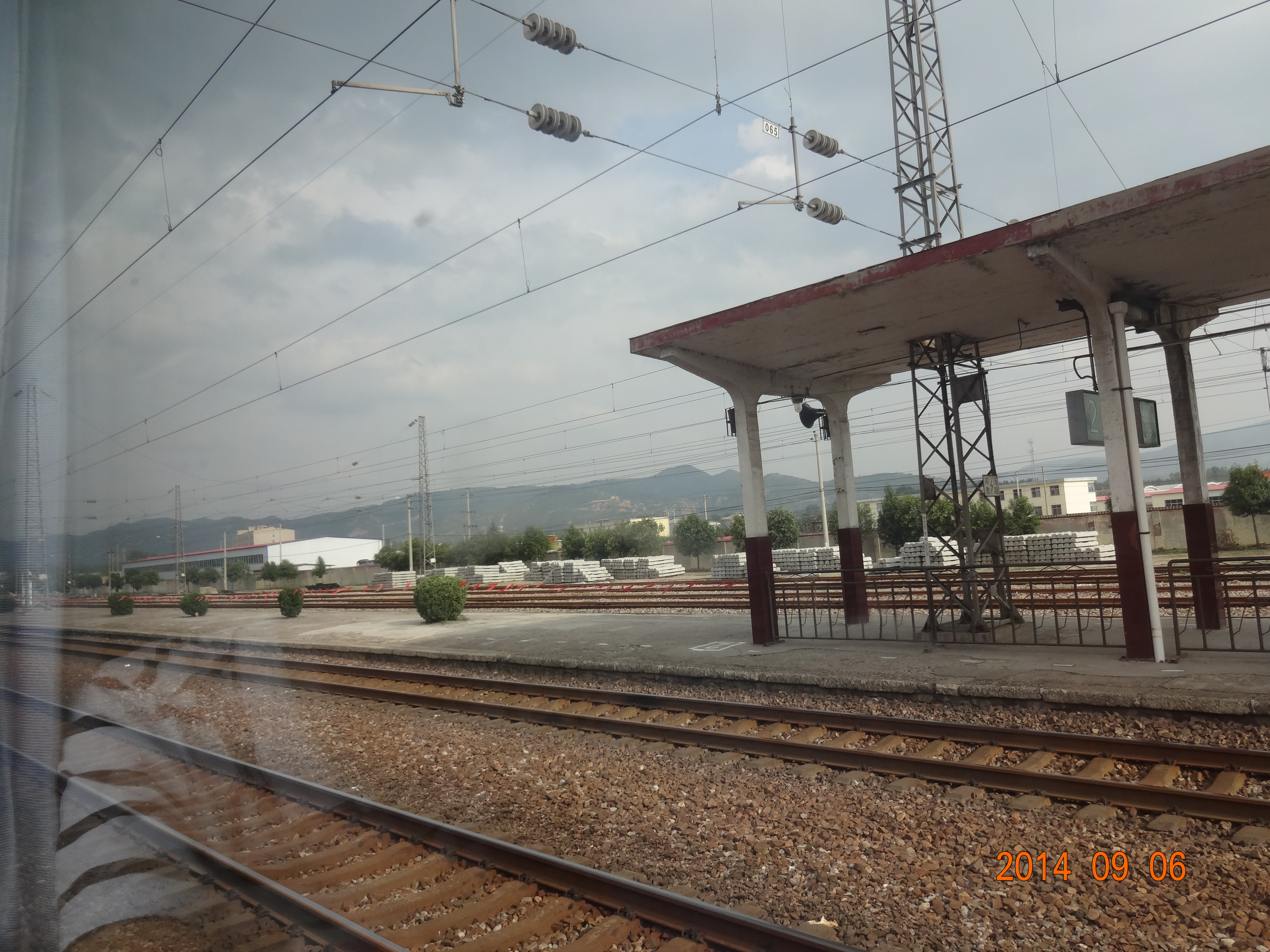

General information
- Location: 1 Chezhan Road; Lingbao, Sanmenxia, Henan; China
- Coordinates: 34.5112°N 110.8927°E
- Operator: CR Zhengzhou
- Line: Longhai Railway
- Platforms: 3 (1 island platform and 1 side platform)
- Tracks: 7

Other information
- Station code: 39302 (TMIS code); LBF (telegraph code); LBA (Pinyin code)
- Classification: Class 3 station (三等站)

History
- Opened: 1927

Services
Preceding station	China Railway	Following station
Sanmenxia West towards Lianyungang East	Longhai railway	Tongguan towards Lanzhou
Location
- Location within Henan Location within China

Lingbao railway station (Chinese: 灵宝站) is a railway station of Longhai railway located in Lingbao, Sanmenxia, Henan, China.

== History ==
The station was opened in 1927.
