= Yuandian Town =

Yuandian 原店镇
- Town
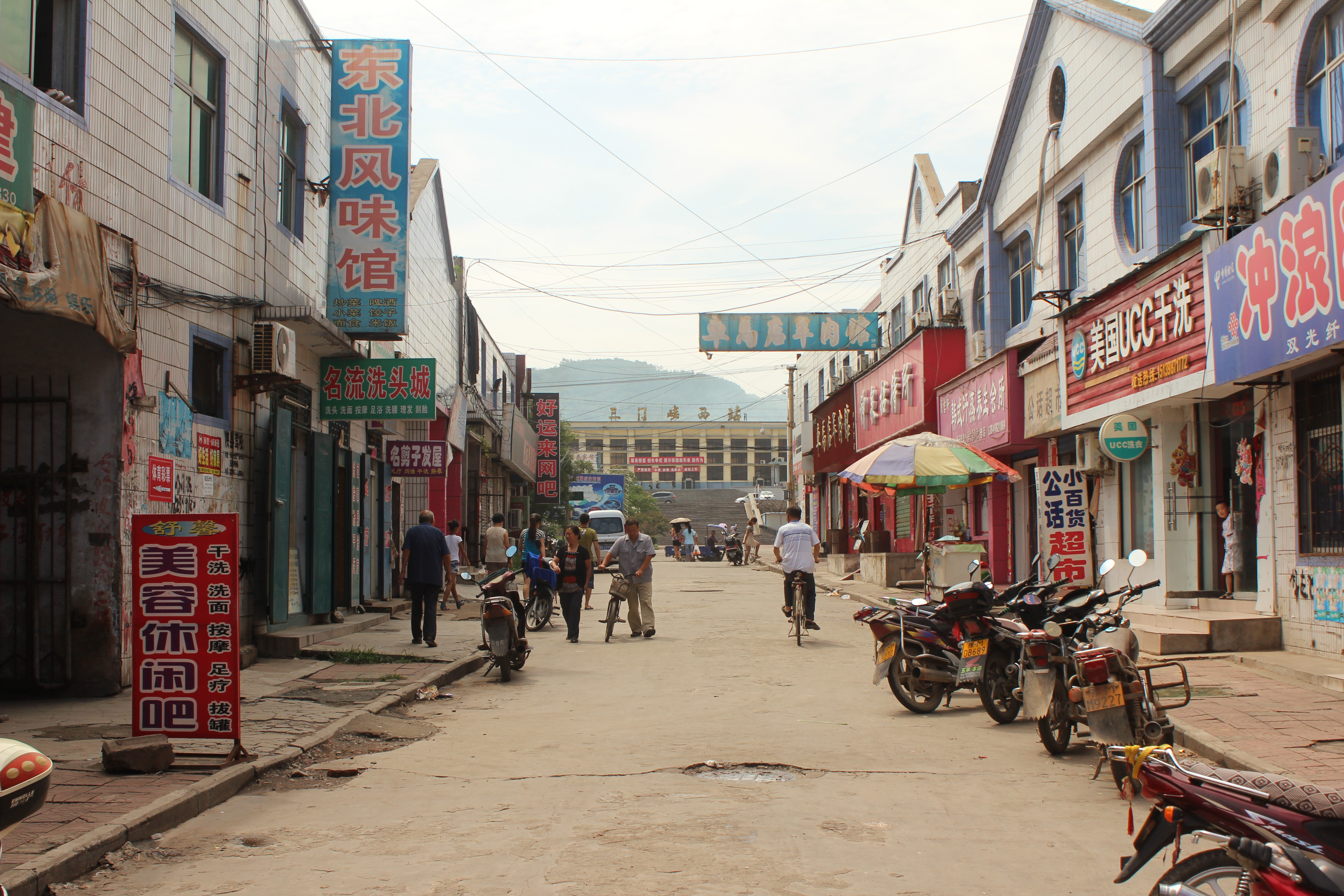

- Location within Henan
- Coordinates: 34.68974°N 111.06601°E
- Country: China
- Province: Henan
- Prefecture-level city: Sanmenxia
- District: Shanzhou

Area
  - Total: 19.73 km^{2} (7.62 sq mi)

Population (2005)
  - Total: 37,055

Yuandian is a town of Shanzhou District, Sanmenxia, Henan, China. The town had a population of 37,055 in 2005.

Sanmenxia West railway station of the Longhai railway is located in the town.

== History ==
Originally the town was called Yuandian written as 袁店. In 1958 it was part of Daying commune. Yuandian town was established in 1962.

A Miaodigou culture (4,400 - 5,500 years ago) archeological site has been found in the town.

== Administrative divisions ==
As of 2016, the town was divided in 6 residential communities and 5 administrative villages.

Residential communities

- Middle community (中区)
- Dongyi community ('North 1', 东一区)
- Dong'er community ('North 2', 东二区)
- West community (西区)
- North community (北区)
- Market community (市场区)

Villages

- Yuandian (原店村)
- Guojia (郭家村)
- Xinjian (新建村)
- Zhaigen (寨根村)
- Chali (岔里村)
