= Sanmenxia West railway station =

Railway station in Sanmenxia, China

Sanmenxiaxi 三门峡西
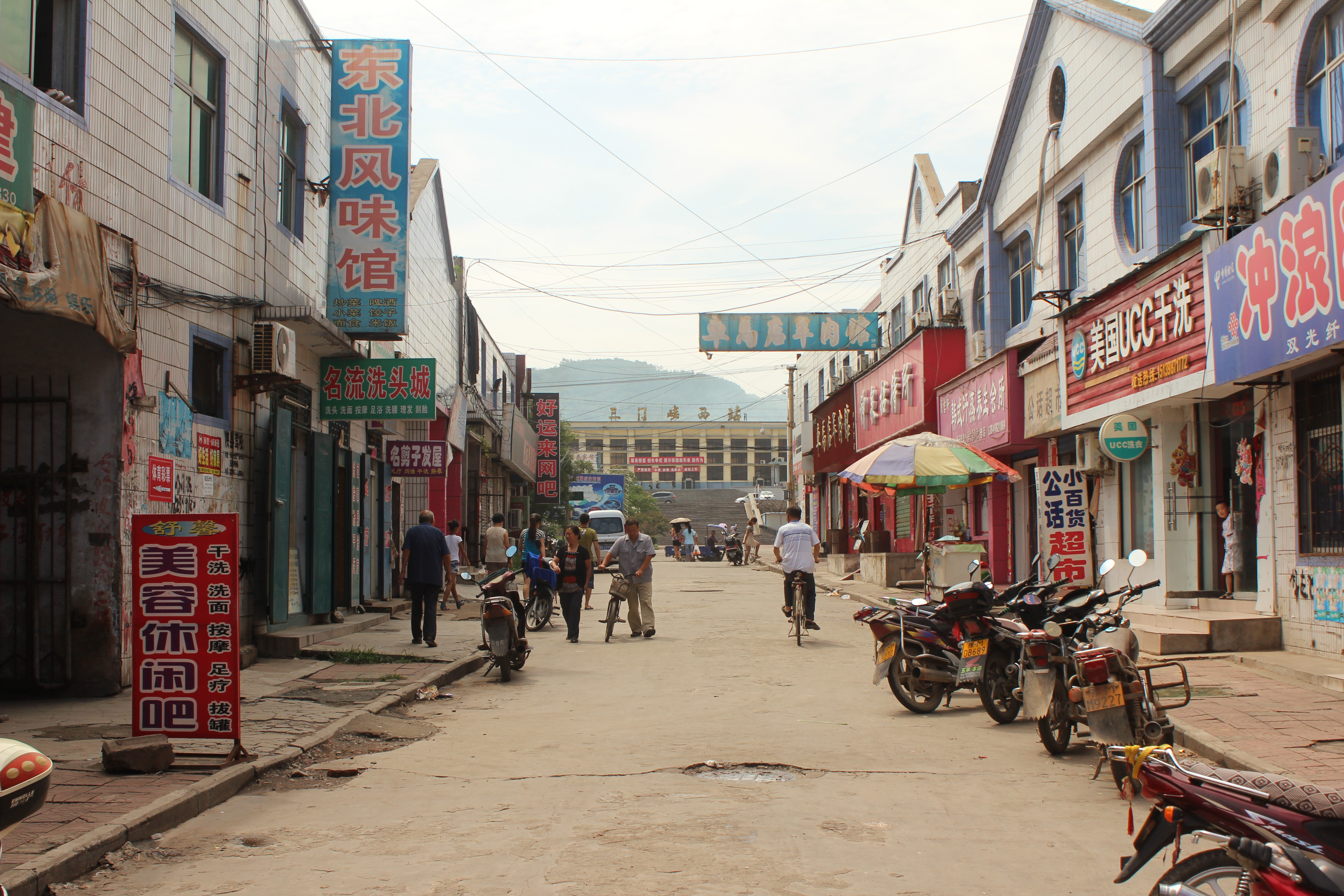
- The street before the station

General information
- Location: Shanzhou District, Sanmenxia, Henan; China
- Coordinates: 34.6881°N 111.0753°E
- Operator: CR Zhengzhou
- Line: Longhai railway

Other information
- Station code: 39269 (TMIS code); SXF (telegraph code); SMX (Pinyin code)
- Classification: Class 2 station (二等站)

History
- Opened: 1924
- Former names: Shanxian (Chinese: 陕县)

Services
Preceding station	China Railway	Following station
Sanmenxia towards Lianyungang East	Longhai railway	Lingbao towards Lanzhou
Location
- Location within Henan Location within China

Sanmenxiaxi (Sanmenxia West) railway station (Chinese: 三门峡西站) is a station on Longhai railway in Shanzhou District, Sanmenxia, Henan.

== History ==
The station was established in 1924.

The station was formerly known as Shanxian railway station (Chinese: 陕县站). It was changed to the current name in 1986.
