= Jianhe =

Jianhe may refer to:

== Locations ==
- Jianhe County, a county in Guizhou, China
- Jianhe Township, Muchuan County (建和乡), a township in Muchuan County, Sichuan, China
- Jianhe Township, Yanting County (剑河乡), a township in Yanting County, Sichuan, China
- Jianhe Subdistrict, Taiyuan (涧河街道), a subdistrict in Xinghualing District, Taiyuan, Shanxi, China
- Jianhe Subdistrict, Sanmenxia (涧河街道), a subdistrict in Hubin District, Sanmenxia, Henan, China

== Historical eras ==
- Jianhe (147–149), era name used by Emperor Huan of Han
- Jianhe (400–402), era name used by Tufa Lilugu, Southern Liang ruler
