= Sucun Township, Henan =

Sucun Township 苏村乡
- Township
- Location in Henan
- Coordinates: 34°25′31″N 110°56′31″E
- Country: People's Republic of China
- Province: Henan
- Prefecture-level city: Sanmenxia
- County-level city: Lingbao
- Village-level divisions: 32 villages
- Elevation: 941 m (3,087 ft)
- Time zone: UTC+8 (China Standard)
- Area code: 0398

Sucun Township (simplified Chinese: 苏村乡; traditional Chinese: 蘇村鄉; pinyin: Sūcūn Xiāng) is a township under the administration of Lingbao, in western Henan province, China, located 11 kilometres (6.8 mi) south of downtown Lingbao in the Qin Mountains. As of 2011, it has 32 villages under its administration.
