= Hongqingsi Grottoes =

Buddhist site in Henan, China

Coordinates: 34°42′29″N 111°58′14″E

Hongqing Temple Grotto (Chinese: 鸿庆寺石窟) is located in Yima, Henan. It consists of five caves, with a total of 46 shrines. More than 120 statues were chiseled during the Northern Wei Dynasty. In 1963, it was registered as a place of cultural importance in Henan, and was listed (item 5-456) in the fifth edition of Chinese national cultural relics in 2001.

== See also ==
- List of Major National Historical and Cultural Sites in Henan
