= Pangkou =

Pangkou 庞口镇
- Town
- Pángkǒu Zhèn
- Location in Hebei Location in China
- Coordinates: 38°38′46.9″N 115°56′58.6″E
- Country: People's Republic of China
- Province: Hebei
- Prefecture-level city: Baoding
- County: Gaoyang County

Area
  - Total: 83.40 km^{2} (32.20 sq mi)

Population (2010)
  - Total: 47,139
  - Density: 565.2/km^{2} (1,464/sq mi)
- Time zone: UTC+8 (China Standard)
- Area code: 312

Pangkou (Chinese: 庞口镇; pinyin: Pángkǒu Zhèn) is a town in Gaoyang County, under the administration of Baoding, in Hebei Province, China. As of the 2010 census, it had a population of 47,139 inhabitants. The total area of the town is 83.40 square kilometers, resulting in a population density of approximately 565 people per square kilometer.

According to the 2010 census, the population consisted of 24,266 males (48.5%) and 22,873 females (51.5%). Age distribution data indicates that 9,002 individuals (19.1%) were aged 0–14 years, 33,938 (72.0%) were aged 15–64 years, and 4,199 (8.9%) were aged 65 years or older.

== See also ==
- List of township-level divisions of Hebei
