= Xiyan Township, Henan =

Xiyan Township 西阎乡
- Township
- Location in Henan
- Coordinates: 34°34′32″N 110°44′16″E
- Country: People's Republic of China
- Province: Henan
- Prefecture-level city: Sanmenxia
- County-level city: Lingbao
- Village-level divisions: 39 villages
- Elevation: 362 m (1,188 ft)
- Time zone: UTC+8 (China Standard Time)
- Area code: 0398

Xiyan Township (simplified Chinese: 西阎乡; traditional Chinese: 西閻鄉; pinyin: Xīyán Xiāng) is a township under the administration of Lingbao City, in western Henan province, China, situated just north of G30 Lianyungang–Khorgas Expressway and 15 kilometres (9.3 mi) northwest of downtown Lingbao. As of 2011, it has 39 villages under its administration.
