= Gao Yan =

Gao Yan may refer to:

- Gao Yan, Emperor Xiaozhao of Northern Qi
- Gao Yan (Northern Qi prince), prince of Northern Qi, son of Emperor Wucheng and nephew of Emperor Xiaozhao
- J. J. M. de Groot, Chinese name Gao Yan, Dutch sinologist
- Gao Yan (politician, born 1942), former Communist Party Secretary of Yunnan, Governor of Jilin, and leader of the State Power Corporation of China
- Gao Yan (politician, born 1958) (Chinese: 高燕), former Vice Minister of Commerce, and Chairwoman of the China Council for the Promotion of International Trade (CCPIT) from 2018 to 2022.

== See also ==
- Gaoyang (disambiguation)
