= Xin'anxian railway station =

Railway station in Luoyang, China

Xin'anxian 新安县

General information
- Location: 39 Qinhuang Road South; Xin'an County, Luoyang, Henan; China
- Coordinates: 34.7193°N 112.1480°E
- Operator: CR Zhengzhou
- Line: Longhai railway
- Connections: Bus terminal

Other information
- Station code: 39197 (TMIS code); XAF (telegraph code); XAX (Pinyin code)
- Classification: Class 3 station (三等站)

History
- Opened: 1915

Services
Preceding station	China Railway	Following station
Luoyang towards Lianyungang East	Longhai railway	Yima towards Lanzhou
Location
- Location within Henan Location within China

Xin'anxian railway station (Chinese: 新安县站, literally "Xin'an County railway station") is a station on Longhai railway in Xin'an County, Luoyang, Henan.

== History ==
The station was established in 1915.
