= Xingjianan =

Xingjianan 邢家南镇
- Town
- Xíngjiānán Zhèn
- Location in Hebei Location in China
- Coordinates: 38°41′00.2″N 115°43′05.9″E
- Country: People's Republic of China
- Province: Hebei
- Prefecture-level city: Baoding
- County: Gaoyang County

Area
  - Total: 50.02 km^{2} (19.31 sq mi)

Population (2010)
  - Total: 34,972
  - Density: 699.2/km^{2} (1,811/sq mi)
- Time zone: UTC+8 (China Standard)
- Area code: 312

Xingjianan (Chinese: 邢家南镇; pinyin: Xíngjiānán Zhèn) is a town located in Gaoyang County, under the jurisdiction of Baoding city in Hebei Province, China. According to the 2010 national census, the town had a population of 34,972 and covered an area of 50.02 square kilometers, resulting in a population density of approximately 699.2 inhabitants per square kilometer.

As per the 2010 census, the gender composition of the town was 17,716 males (49.3%) and 17,256 females (50.7%). The age distribution was 5,791 (16.6%) individuals aged 0–14 years, 26,099 (74.6%) individuals aged 15–64 years, and 3,082 (8.8%) aged 65 and above.

== See also ==
- List of township-level divisions of Hebei
