= Tongguan railway station =

Railway station in Shaanxi, China

Tongguan 潼关
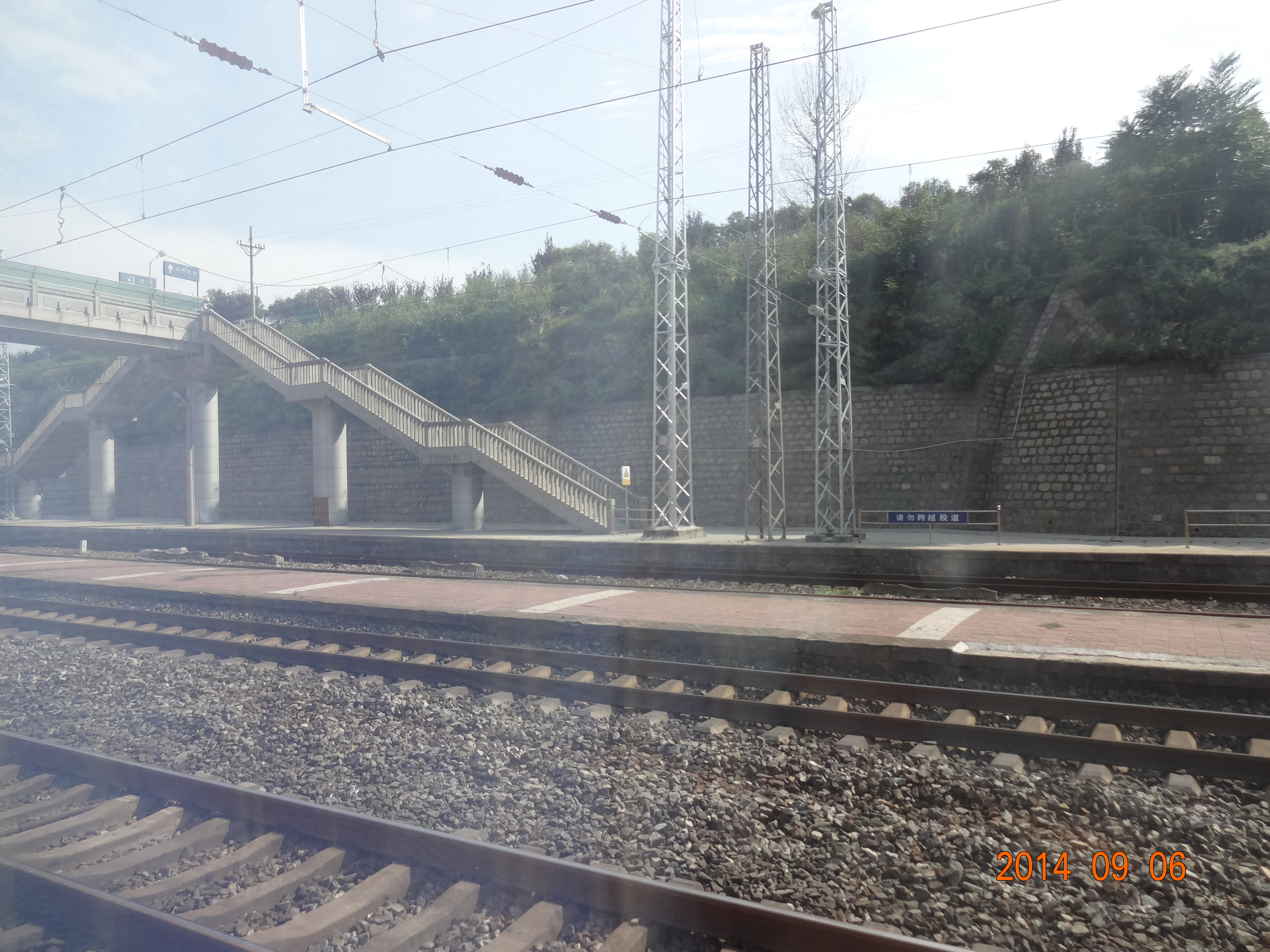

General information
- Location: Tongguan County, Weinan, Shaanxi; China
- Coordinates: 34°32′12″N 110°14′33″E
- Operator: CR Xi'an
- Line: Longhai Railway
- Platforms: 4 (1 island platform and 2 side platforms)
- Tracks: 5

Other information
- Station code: 39332 (TMIS code); TGY (telegraph code); TGU (Pinyin code)
- Classification: Class 3 station (三等站)

History
- Opened: 1931

Services
| Preceding station | China Railway | Following station |
|---|---|---|
| Lingbao towards Lianyungang East | Longhai railway | Huashan towards Lanzhou |
Location
- Location within China

Tongguan railway station (Chinese: 潼关站) is a railway station of Longhai railway located in Tongguan County, Weinan, Shaanxi, China.

The station is the easternmost station operated by CR Xi'an on Longhai railway.

== History ==
The station was opened in 1931.
