= Pukou Township =

Pukou Township 蒲口乡
- Township
- Púkǒu Xiāng
- Location in Hebei Location in China
- Coordinates: 38°43′26.1″N 115°48′24.6″E
- Country: People's Republic of China
- Province: Hebei
- Prefecture-level city: Baoding
- County: Gaoyang County

Area
  - Total: 51.15 km^{2} (19.75 sq mi)

Population (2010)
  - Total: 24,079
  - Density: 470.8/km^{2} (1,219/sq mi)
- Time zone: UTC+8 (China Standard)
- Area code: 312

Pukou Township (Chinese: 蒲口乡; pinyin: Púkǒu Xiāng) is a rural township in Gaoyang County, under the jurisdiction of Baoding, Hebei Province, China. According to the 2010 census, the township had a population of 24,079 residing in an area of 51.15 square kilometers, giving a population density of approximately 470.8 inhabitants per square kilometer.

In terms of demographic distribution in 2010, the population consisted of 12,276 males (49%) and 11,803 females (51%). Age-wise, 4,629 individuals (19.2%) were under 14 years of age, 17,482 (72.6%) were between 15 and 64, and 1,968 (8.2%) were aged 65 or older.

== See also ==
- List of township-level divisions of Hebei
