= Hua (state) =

Former country in East Asia (destroyed 627 BC)

Hua (Chinese: 滑; pinyin: Huá) was a vassal state of the Zhou dynasty in modern Yanshi, Henan Province. It was destroyed by the Qin state in 627 BC.

The ruins of Hua are located in Huachenghe Village, Yanshi. It is now a Major National Historical and Cultural Site.
