= Lingbao City =

Lingbao 灵宝市 Lingpao
- County-level city
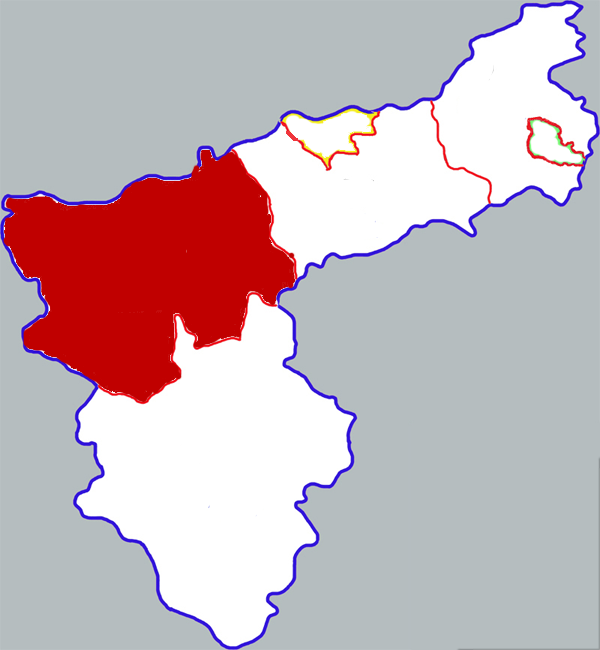

- Location of the city center in Henan
- Coordinates: 34°31′03″N 110°53′39″E
- Country: People's Republic of China
- Province: Henan
- Prefecture-level city: Sanmenxia

Area
  - Total: 3,011 km^{2} (1,163 sq mi)

Population (2019)
  - Total: 736,300
  - Density: 244.5/km^{2} (633.3/sq mi)
- Time zone: UTC+8 (China Standard)
- Postal code: 472500
- Website: Archived link

Lingbao City
- Simplified Chinese: 灵宝市
- Traditional Chinese: 靈寶市
Transcriptions
Standard Mandarin
- Hanyu Pinyin: Língbǎo shì
- Wade–Giles: Ling^{2}-pao^{3} si^{5}

Lingbao (Chinese: 灵宝; postal: Lingpao) is a county-level city and the westernmost county-level division of Henan province, China, bordering the provinces of Shanxi to the north and Shaanxi to the west, under the administration of the prefecture-level city of Sanmenxia. In ancient times, the Hongnong Commandery was located approximately 20 km south of there. Since 2005, there is a HVDC back-to-back station built by ABB with a transmission rate of 360 MW.

Lingbao city has a population of 720,000 residents in 2006.

The legend of Kuafu is said to be set in Lingbao, which has therefore previously been called Taolin (peach orchard).

== History ==
Lingbao City can be traced back to 114 BC as an administrative division, when it was known as Hongnong (弘农县).

In 1993 Linbao City was established from Lingbao County.

== Administrative divisions ==
As of 2012, this city is divided to 10 towns and 5 townships.

Towns

- Chengguan (城关镇)
- Yinzhuang (尹庄镇)
- Zhuyang (朱阳镇)
- Yangping (阳平镇)
- Guxian (故县镇)
- Yuling (豫灵镇)
- Lingbao (大王镇)
- Yangdian (阳店镇)
- Hanguguan (函谷关镇)
- Jiaocun (焦村镇)

Townships

- Chuankou Township (川口乡)
- Sihe Township (寺河乡)
- Sucun Township (苏村乡)
- Wumiao Township (五亩乡)
- Xiyan Township (西阎乡)

== Climate ==
Climate data for Lingbao, elevation 485 m (1,591 ft), (1991–2020 normals, extremes 1981–2010)
| Month | Jan | Feb | Mar | Apr | May | Jun | Jul | Aug | Sep | Oct | Nov | Dec | Year |
|---|---|---|---|---|---|---|---|---|---|---|---|---|---|
| Record high °C (°F) | 15.4 (59.7) | 21.4 (70.5) | 29.7 (85.5) | 35.5 (95.9) | 39.4 (102.9) | 41.2 (106.2) | 40.3 (104.5) | 39.8 (103.6) | 39.5 (103.1) | 32.9 (91.2) | 26.1 (79.0) | 19.0 (66.2) | 41.2 (106.2) |
| Mean daily maximum °C (°F) | 5.3 (41.5) | 9.7 (49.5) | 16.1 (61.0) | 22.8 (73.0) | 27.5 (81.5) | 31.5 (88.7) | 32.5 (90.5) | 30.8 (87.4) | 26.0 (78.8) | 20.2 (68.4) | 13.1 (55.6) | 6.9 (44.4) | 20.2 (68.4) |
| Daily mean °C (°F) | −0.5 (31.1) | 3.5 (38.3) | 9.6 (49.3) | 15.9 (60.6) | 20.8 (69.4) | 25.2 (77.4) | 26.9 (80.4) | 25.3 (77.5) | 20.3 (68.5) | 14 (57) | 6.9 (44.4) | 1.0 (33.8) | 14.1 (57.3) |
| Mean daily minimum °C (°F) | −4.7 (23.5) | −1.1 (30.0) | 4.2 (39.6) | 9.8 (49.6) | 14.8 (58.6) | 19.4 (66.9) | 22.2 (72.0) | 20.8 (69.4) | 16.0 (60.8) | 9.6 (49.3) | 2.5 (36.5) | −3.1 (26.4) | 9.2 (48.6) |
| Record low °C (°F) | −15.1 (4.8) | −15.8 (3.6) | −11.0 (12.2) | −2.3 (27.9) | 2.1 (35.8) | 9.4 (48.9) | 14.0 (57.2) | 12.9 (55.2) | 6.0 (42.8) | −4.1 (24.6) | −14.6 (5.7) | −15.8 (3.6) | −15.8 (3.6) |
| Average precipitation mm (inches) | 7.4 (0.29) | 12.0 (0.47) | 21.7 (0.85) | 41.5 (1.63) | 63.3 (2.49) | 69.4 (2.73) | 109.5 (4.31) | 93.1 (3.67) | 91.1 (3.59) | 54.4 (2.14) | 25.0 (0.98) | 5.0 (0.20) | 593.4 (23.35) |
| Average precipitation days (≥ 0.1 mm) | 3.7 | 4.2 | 5.7 | 7.2 | 8.4 | 8.4 | 10.8 | 10.1 | 10.1 | 8.3 | 6.2 | 3.0 | 86.1 |
| Average snowy days | 4.9 | 3.3 | 1.4 | 0.2 | 0 | 0 | 0 | 0 | 0 | 0 | 1.6 | 3.1 | 14.5 |
| Average relative humidity (%) | 58 | 57 | 54 | 55 | 57 | 60 | 69 | 73 | 74 | 73 | 69 | 61 | 63 |
| Mean monthly sunshine hours | 128.1 | 131.2 | 168.2 | 197.1 | 205.0 | 205.3 | 199.3 | 182.9 | 145.7 | 140.6 | 132.5 | 139.1 | 1,975 |
| Percentage possible sunshine | 41 | 42 | 45 | 50 | 47 | 48 | 46 | 44 | 40 | 41 | 43 | 46 | 44 |
Source: China Meteorological Administration

== Transportation ==
- China National Highway 209

== See also ==
- Prince of Hongnong
