= Liu Qingxia =

Chinese educator and politician (1877–1922)

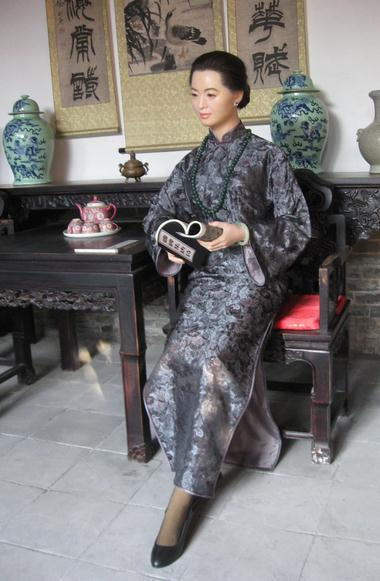
Wax figure of Liu Qingxia in her former residence

Liu Qingxia (Chinese: 刘青霞; 1877–1922) was a Chinese teacher and politician. At age 18 she married Liu Yaode in Weishi County. She founded the first girls' school in Henan province. She had a reputation similar to Qiu Jin.

== Early life ==
Liu Qingxia was born in an official family in 1877. Her father was an official. Influenced by her family, she observed the social situation and politics. She was well-educated and open-minded. In 1895, she married. Her husband died in 1992. She provided money to set up free schools and gave food for elders at festivals.

== Career ==
=== Trip to Japan ===
In 1907, Liu Qingxia traveled to Japan with her brother and son. this trip had significant implications for Liu Qingxia. After her son went to kindergarten, she got acquainted with Sun Zhongshan and Lu Xun. Through frequent contact with Japanese students, she began to accept bourgeois ideas and joined Tung Meng Hui.

=== Education and politics ===
In Japan she provided money to publish Henan magazine in Tokyo. She and her friends co-founded a magazine that promoted women's liberation. When she returned to China, she promoted the development of Henan culture. In 1908 she provided money to set up a primary school in Kaifeng. In 1909 she founded Henan's first girls' school. She provided land to set up a sericulture school. In 1922, she donated her family property to government to support education in Henan.

In 1911, she was elected president of the Beijing Women's Tongmeng Hui. In the summer, she rescued a group of revolutionaries, and donated money for armed uprisings.

=== Residence ===
Based on Liu's courtyard in Kaifeng city, this residence was built in her memory. This building was a national key cultural relics protected unit. This residence covers 900 square meters. The building is a good example of typical Chinese traditional buildings and contains 70 rooms.

== Recognition ==
In 1903 she was canonized as a First-class lady.

Sun Zhongshan wrote an inscription for her: “The public” (Chinese: 天下为公).
