= Gaoyang, Hebei =

Gaoyang 高阳镇
- Town
- Interactive map of Gaoyang
- Coordinates: 38°41′24″N 115°46′50″E
- Country: People's Republic of China
- Province: Hebei
- Prefecture-level city: Baoding
- County: Gaoyang
- Elevation: 13 m (43 ft)
- Time zone: UTC+8 (China Standard)
- Postal code: 071500

Gaoyang (simplified Chinese: 高阳; traditional Chinese: 高陽; pinyin: Gāoyáng) is a town in and the seat of Gaoyang County, in south-central Hebei province, China, about 30 km (19 mi) southeast of Baoding. As of 2011, it has 10 residential communities (社区) and 13 villages under its administration.

== See also ==
- List of township-level divisions of Hebei
