= Hongnong Wang =

Hongnong Wang (弘農王, Prince/King of Hongnong) may refer to:

- Liu Bian (176–190), Han dynasty emperor, known as Prince of Hongnong after he was deposed in 189
- Yang Wo (886–908), Wu dynasty ruler during the Five Dynasties period, known as Prince/King of Hongnong during his reign (905–908)
- Yang Longyan (897–920), Wu dynasty ruler during the Five Dynasties period, known as Prince/King of Hongnong from 908 to 910
- Yang Lian (prince) (died 940), Wu dynasty prince during the Five Dynasties period, posthumously created Prince of Hongnong by the Southern Tang dynasty
- Yang Bin (died 950), Later Han (Five Dynasties) chief councilor, posthumously created Prince of Hongnong by the Later Zhou dynasty
