= Shanzhou, Sanmenxia =

Shanzhou 陕州区
- District
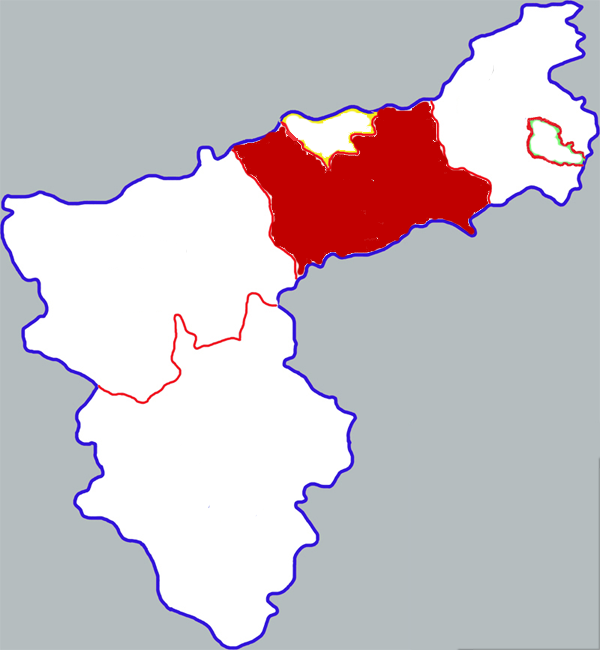
- Shanzhou in Sanmenxia

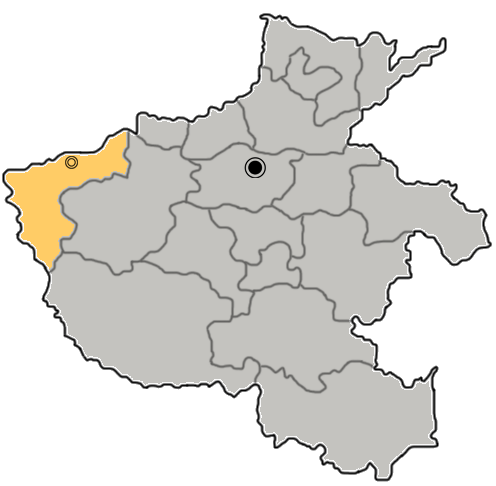
- Sanmenxia in Henan
- Coordinates: 34°43′16″N 111°06′14″E
- Country: People's Republic of China
- Province: Henan
- Prefecture-level city: Sanmenxia

Area
  - District: 1,763 km^{2} (681 sq mi)
  - Urban: 15.2 km^{2} (5.9 sq mi)
- Elevation: 360 m (1,180 ft)
- Highest elevation: 1,466 m (4,810 ft)
- Lowest elevation: 308 m (1,010 ft)

Population (2019)
  - District: 350,700
  - Density: 198.9/km^{2} (515.2/sq mi)
  - Urban: 126,000
- Time zone: UTC+8 (China Standard)
- Postal code: 472001
- Website: shanxian.smx.gov.cn

Shanzhou, Sanmenxia
- Traditional Chinese: 陝州
- Simplified Chinese: 陕州
- Literal meaning: Shan Pass Prefecture
Transcriptions
Standard Mandarin
- Hanyu Pinyin: Shǎnzhōu

Former names

Shan County
- Traditional Chinese: 陝縣
- Simplified Chinese: 陕县
Transcriptions
Standard Mandarin
- Hanyu Pinyin: Shǎnxiàn

Shanzhou District, previously known as Shan County or Shanxian or Shaan, is an urban district of Sanmenxia in western Henan, China, bordering Shanxi province to the north.

It is located on the southern bank of the Yellow River and includes the Shan Pass, which gives its name to the district and to neighboring Shaanxi.

== History ==
During the Neolithic era, the area was already inhabited by several large tribes. According to Chinese tradition, it was ruled between the 21st century BC and the 16th century BC by the Xia dynasty and between the 16th to the 11th century BC, it belonged to the Shang dynasty. The existence of the Shang dynasty has been confirmed by archeology.

In 390 BC, Shan County was established, the area was often the battleground between the Qin and Wei. In 225 BC it definitively became part of the Qin area, governed by Sanchuan commandery.

In 1952, Shan County became part of Luoyang. After the Sanmenxia Dam was (almost) completed in 1959, it became part of Sanmenxia City. In 2016 the county became Shanzhou District.

== Administrative divisions ==
As of 2012, this district is divided to 4 towns and 9 townships.

Towns

- Daying (大营镇)
- Yuandian (原店镇)
- Xizhangcun (西张村镇)
- Guanyintang (观音堂镇)

Townships

- Zhangbian Township (张汴乡)
- Zhangwan Township (张湾乡)
- Caiyuan Township (菜园乡)
- Zhangmao Township (张茅乡)
- Wangjiahou Township (王家后乡)
- Xiashi Township (硖石乡)
- Xilicun Township (西李村乡)
- Gongqian Township (宫前乡)
- Dianzi Township (店子乡)

== Culture ==
Shanzhou is known for its Mahua fried dough snack and Guanyintang dried beef.
