= Sanyangzhuang =

Archeological site in Henan, China

Sanyangzhuang (Chinese: 三杨庄; Pinyin: Sānyángzhuāng) is an archaeological site in Henan Province, China.

The Han dynasty village of Sanyangzhuang was buried by a flood of the Yellow River 2,000 years ago.

This site is exceptionally well-preserved and offers significant insights into the basic social structure of the Han dynasty, including how and where the lower class worked and lived. It is particularly rich in information regarding the farming system and land distribution system. The discovery of preserved mulberry leaves and copper coins indicates early involvement in trade along the Silk Road.

The site was discovered by archaeologists in 2003. Research at Sanyangzhuang is being conducted by scholars from Washington University in St. Louis, the Henan Provincial Archaeological Institute, and the College of Environmental Science and Engineering, Peking University.
