= Xiyan, Hebei =

Xiyan 西演镇
- Town
- Xīyǎn Zhèn
- Location in Hebei Location in China
- Coordinates: 38°36′15.3″N 115°52′47.5″E
- Country: People's Republic of China
- Province: Hebei
- Prefecture-level city: Baoding
- County: Gaoyang County

Area
  - Total: 69.14 km^{2} (26.70 sq mi)

Population (2010)
  - Total: 47,624
  - Density: 688.8/km^{2} (1,784/sq mi)
- Time zone: UTC+8 (China Standard)
- Area code: 312

Xiyan (Chinese: 西演镇; pinyin: Xīyǎn Zhèn) is a town in Gaoyang County, under the administration of Baoding, in Hebei Province, China. According to the 2010 census, the town had a population of 47,624 people living within a total area of 69.14 square kilometers, resulting in a population density of approximately 688.8 people per square kilometer.

The gender distribution in the town was 24,162 males (49.3%) and 23,462 females (50.7%) as per the 2010 census. The age structure was 9,098 (19.1%) aged 0–14 years, 34,147 (71.7%) aged 15–64 years, and 4,379 (9.2%) aged 65 years or older.

== See also ==
- List of township-level divisions of Hebei
