= Yima, Henan =

Yima 义马市
- County-level city
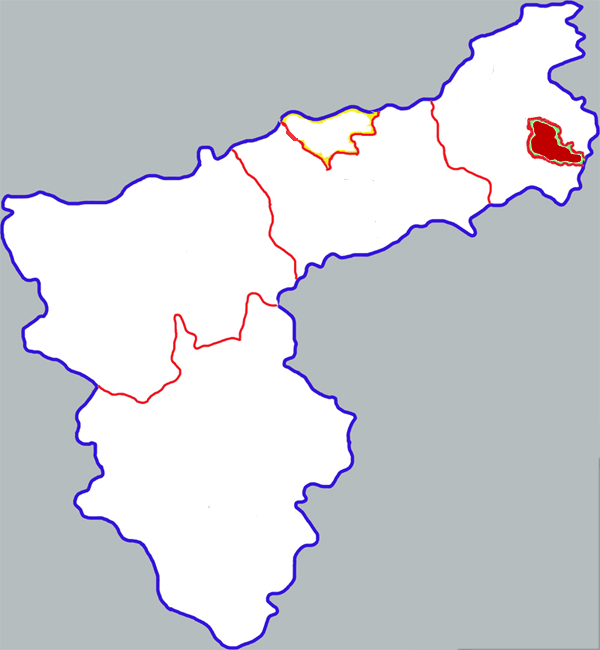

- Location in Henan
- Coordinates: 34°44′49″N 111°52′30″E
- Country: People's Republic of China
- Province: Henan
- Prefecture-level city: Sanmenxia

Area
  - County-level city: 100.5 km^{2} (38.8 sq mi)
  - Metro: 1,462.4 km^{2} (564.6 sq mi)

Population (2018 estimation)
  - County-level city: 147,800
  - Density: 1,471/km^{2} (3,809/sq mi)
  - Metro: 498,500
  - Metro density: 340.9/km^{2} (882.9/sq mi)
- Time zone: UTC+8 (China Standard)
- Postal code: 472300
- Website: www.yima.gov.cn

Yima (simplified Chinese: 义马; traditional Chinese: 義馬; pinyin: Yìmǎ) is a county-level city under the administration of Sanmenxia in Henan, China. It is located along the old Xiaohan Route, historically serving as a connection between the important eastern and western capitals of Luoyang and Chang'an.

The area has been a site of military and commercial importance since antiquity. Yima's history dates back more than two thousand years to the Xin'an county of Qin dynasty.

Yima became Henan's first county-level city in 1981, initially managed by the Luoyang Administrative Office and transferred to Sanmenxia in 1986. Today, it is one of Henan Province's 48 counties with extended autonomy. It is the smallest city in China (112 square kilometers with a population of about 140,000).

== Economy ==
Relying on its own resource advantages, Yima vigorously develops heavy chemical industry, bringing rapid economic growth. In 2010, the city's per capita GDP was over 70,000 RMB, which is about US$10,000, and ranked No.1 in terms of county economy in Henan Province (perennially ranks top five). The city is also known as "The Home of Martial Arts".

Coal mining and processing dominate Yima's economy, and the Yima Coal Industry Group is the city's largest employer. At its peak in 2004, 76% of the local economy depended on coal. Since 2014, closures of several local coal mines due to national efforts to address coal overcapacity have contributed to an economic decline in Yima. In 2019, 15 were killed by an explosion at a gas plant operated by Henan Gas Group in Yima.

== Geography ==
Yima is located in the western part of Henan Province, China, and lies between 34°42' - 34°46' north latitude and 111°50'47" - 111°50'49" east longitude. It is 183 kilometers east of Zhengzhou, the provincial capital, and 65 kilometers west of Sanmenxia.

=== Climate ===
Yima is located in a warm temperate zone, on the southern edge of the North Subtropics. There are four distinct seasons and abundant sunshine. The average annual temperature is 12.4°C. During July, the hottest month of the year, the average temperature is 25.5°C. In the coldest months, the average temperature is -2.1°C. The average annual amount of sunshine hours is 2250.4 hours, with an average annual sunshine rate of 51%. The area experiences southeastern winds in spring and summer, and northwestern winds in autumn and winter. There has abundant plant and animal resources, with an average annual rainfall of 666.9 millimeters.

== Administrative divisions ==
As of 2012, this city is divided to 7 subdistricts.

Subdistricts

- Qianqiulu Subdistrict (千秋路街道)
- Chaoyanglu Subdistrict (朝阳路街道)
- Xinyijie Subdistrict (新义街街道)
- Changcunlu Subdistrict (常村路街道)
- Taishanlu Subdistrict (泰山路街道)
- Xinqu Subdistrict (新区街道)
- Dongqu Subdistrict (东区街道)

== Transportation ==
G30 Lianyungang–Khorgas Expressway, China National Highway 310 both pass through Yima. Zhengzhou–Xi'an high-speed railway, and Longhai Railway also pass through Yima.

== Cultural history ==
By the end of 2022, Yima City had two major historical and cultural sites protected at the national level and three cultural heritage sites under provincial-level protection.

- Hongqingsi Grottoes
- Chu Pits Site

The site where Xiang Yu had the 200,000 surrendered Qin soldiers buried alive. The site covers an area of 70 to 80 Mu. In 1912, workers constructing the Longhai Railway unearthed large amounts of ancient human remains from here. The built railway goes through the site, and the original look of the pits no longer exists.

- Empress Cixi's temporary residence

During the Battle of Beijing, Cixi and Guangxu fled Beijing and evacuated to Xi'an as the Eight-Nation Alliance invaded the city. The temporary residence was built when they stayed shortly in this area on their way back to Beijing from Xi'an, more than a year later.

- Site of the Qin Dynasty town Xin'an

The township Xin'an existed during the Qin and Han dynasties, and its construction can be traced back to the Warring States period. The total area of the ancient site is 300,000 square meters. It is rectangular in shape, longer from north to south and narrower from east to west. Cultural layers can be found everywhere in the site.

- Yima's Ginkgo Fossils

In the 1960s, an open-pit coal mine was mined in Yoma, the coal gangue blocks excavated had obvious leaf-like texture. In the early 1980s, scientists have systemically collected fossils in this area. The discovery has been confirmed as the Yima paleoflora, among which the complete ginkgo leafs fossils collected have been officially named Ginkgo yimaensis, which is the oldest ginkgo species in the world, dated to 170million years ago.
