= Hubin, Sanmenxia =

Hubin 湖滨区
- District
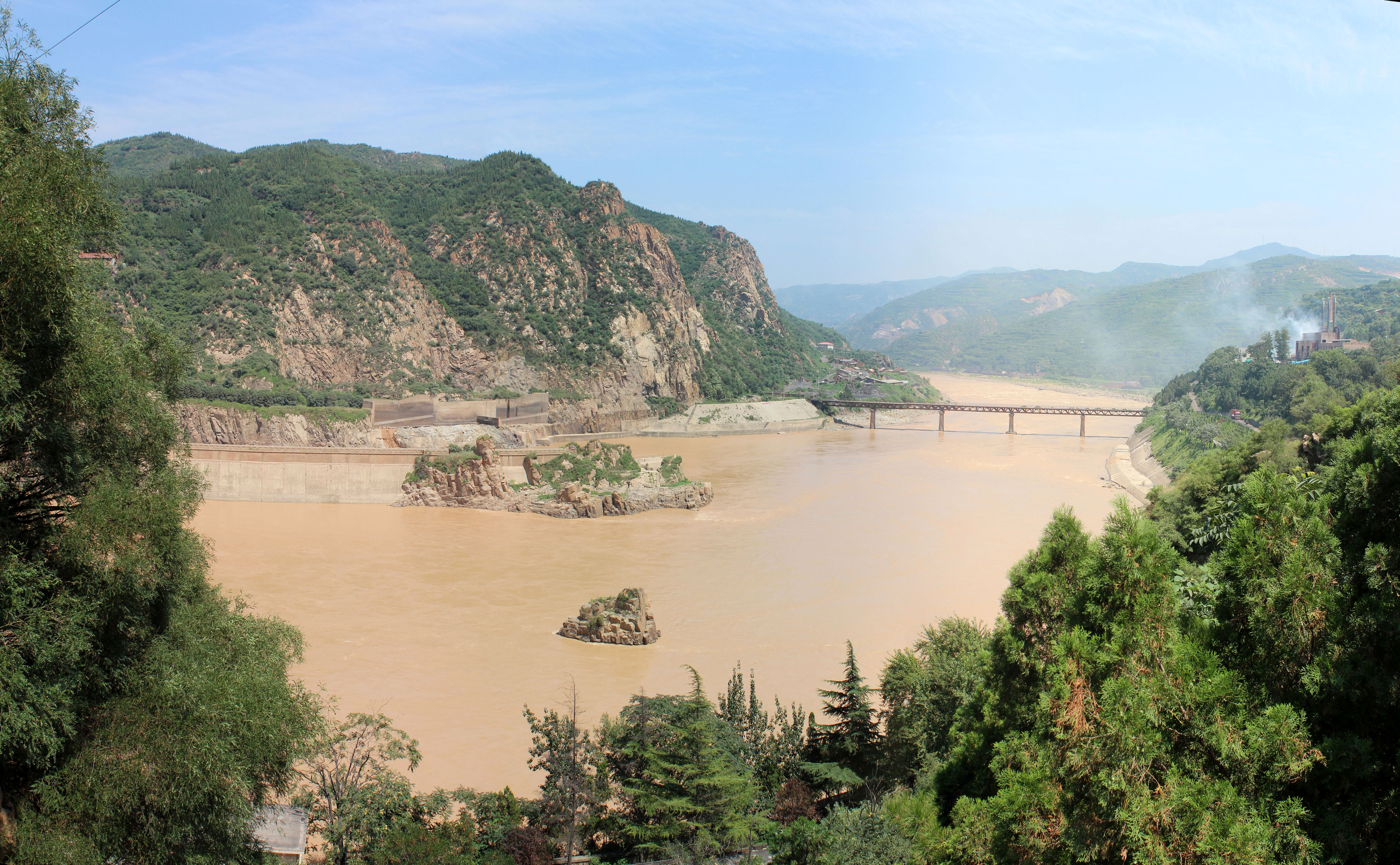

- Location in Henan
- Coordinates: 34°46′44″N 111°12′00″E
- Country: People's Republic of China
- Province: Henan
- Prefecture-level city: Sanmenxia

Area
  - Total: 164 km^{2} (63 sq mi)

Population (2019)
  - Total: 325,200
  - Density: 1,980/km^{2} (5,140/sq mi)
- Time zone: UTC+8 (China Standard)
- Postal code: 472000

Hubin District (simplified Chinese: 湖滨; traditional Chinese: 湖濱; pinyin: Húbīn) is a district of the city of Sanmenxia, Henan, China.

== Administrative divisions ==
As of 2012, this district is divided to 8 subdistricts and 3 townships.

Subdistricts

- Hubin Subdistrict, Sanmenxia (湖滨街道)
- Qianjin Subdistrict, Sanmenxia (前进街道)
- Chezhan Subdistrict, Sanmenxia (车站街道)
- Jianhe Subdistrict, Sanmenxia (涧河街道)
- Da'an Subdistrict, Sanmenxia (大安街道)
- Huixing Subdistrict (会兴街道)
- Yadi Subdistrict (崖底街道)

Townships

- Jiaokou Township, Sanmenxia (交口乡)
- Cizhong Township (磁钟乡)
- Gaomiao Township, Sanmenxia (高庙乡)
