= Gaoyang County =

Gaoyang County 高阳县 Kaoyang
- County
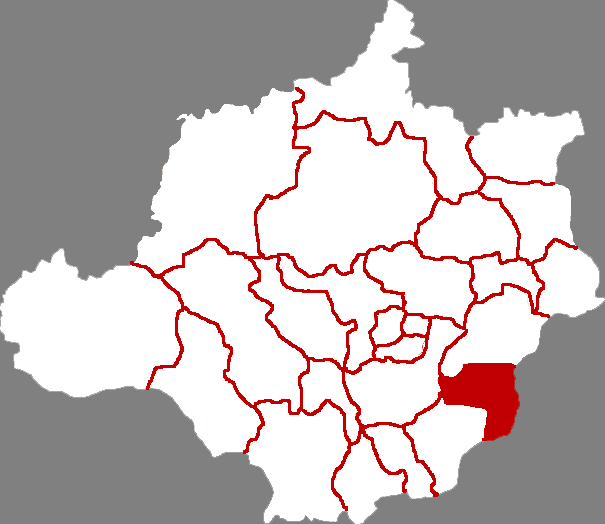
- Gaoyang in Baoding

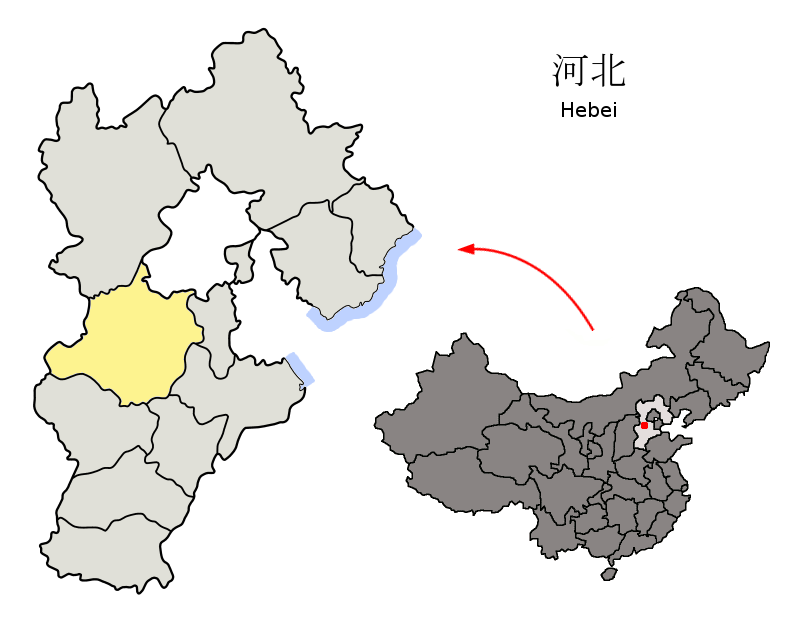
- Baoding in Hebei
- Coordinates: 38°42′00″N 115°46′44″E
- Country: People's Republic of China
- Province: Hebei
- Prefecture-level city: Baoding
- County seat: Gaoyang Town

Area
  - Total: 497 km^{2} (192 sq mi)
- Elevation: 13 m (43 ft)

Population (2006)
  - Total: 320,000
  - Density: 640/km^{2} (1,700/sq mi)
- Time zone: UTC+8 (China Standard)
- Postal code: 071500

Gaoyang County (simplified Chinese: 高阳县; traditional Chinese: 高陽縣; pinyin: Gāoyáng Xiàn; lit. 'High Sun') is a county in the central part of Hebei province, People's Republic of China. It is under the jurisdiction of the prefecture-level city of Baoding and has an area of 497 km^{2} (192 sq mi).

The county seat is in Gaoyang Town (高阳镇).

== Administrative divisions ==
There are 4 towns and 5 townships under the county's administration.

Towns:

- Gaoyang (高阳镇), Pangkou (庞口镇), Xiyan (西演镇), Xingjianan (邢家南镇)

Townships:

- Jinzhuang Township (晋庄乡), Pukou Township (蒲口乡), Xiaowangguozhuang Township (小王果庄乡), Longhua Township (龙化乡), Pangjiazhuang Township (庞家佐乡)

== Climate ==
Climate data for Gaoyang, elevation 10 m (33 ft), (1991–2020 normals, extremes 1981–2010)
Month	Jan	Feb	Mar	Apr	May	Jun	Jul	Aug	Sep	Oct	Nov	Dec	Year
Record high °C (°F)	16.9 (62.4)	22.8 (73.0)	30.5 (86.9)	33.8 (92.8)	38.8 (101.8)	39.9 (103.8)	41.6 (106.9)	38.3 (100.9)	35.4 (95.7)	31.8 (89.2)	24.0 (75.2)	17.4 (63.3)	41.6 (106.9)
Mean daily maximum °C (°F)	2.5 (36.5)	6.8 (44.2)	14.0 (57.2)	21.5 (70.7)	27.4 (81.3)	31.7 (89.1)	32.1 (89.8)	30.4 (86.7)	26.7 (80.1)	20.2 (68.4)	10.8 (51.4)	3.9 (39.0)	19.0 (66.2)
Daily mean °C (°F)	−4.0 (24.8)	0.0 (32.0)	7.2 (45.0)	14.8 (58.6)	20.9 (69.6)	25.4 (77.7)	27.0 (80.6)	25.3 (77.5)	20.3 (68.5)	13.3 (55.9)	4.5 (40.1)	−2.0 (28.4)	12.7 (54.9)
Mean daily minimum °C (°F)	−9.2 (15.4)	−5.4 (22.3)	1.1 (34.0)	8.4 (47.1)	14.3 (57.7)	19.4 (66.9)	22.4 (72.3)	21.1 (70.0)	15.0 (59.0)	7.6 (45.7)	−0.4 (31.3)	−6.6 (20.1)	7.3 (45.2)
Record low °C (°F)	−20.8 (−5.4)	−19.2 (−2.6)	−10.5 (13.1)	−3.0 (26.6)	1.9 (35.4)	8.3 (46.9)	15.4 (59.7)	12.8 (55.0)	4.0 (39.2)	−5.5 (22.1)	−15.4 (4.3)	−21.1 (−6.0)	−21.1 (−6.0)
Average precipitation mm (inches)	1.9 (0.07)	4.8 (0.19)	8.5 (0.33)	23.3 (0.92)	31.4 (1.24)	64.5 (2.54)	135.1 (5.32)	113.0 (4.45)	47.1 (1.85)	25.6 (1.01)	12.3 (0.48)	2.4 (0.09)	469.9 (18.49)
Average precipitation days (≥ 0.1 mm)	1.6	2.1	2.9	4.3	6.0	8.0	11.9	10.0	6.2	5.1	3.4	1.7	63.2
Average snowy days	2.5	2.3	0.9	0.2	0	0	0	0	0	0	1.4	2.4	9.7
Average relative humidity (%)	59	53	50	53	56	61	74	80	75	68	67	63	63
Mean monthly sunshine hours	161.9	172.0	223.1	245.2	271.9	238.8	206.9	209.0	205.3	186.6	159.4	155.7	2,435.8
Percentage possible sunshine	53	56	60	62	61	54	46	50	56	55	53	53	55
Source: China Meteorological Administration

== Notable inhabitants ==
- Liang Tsai-Ping, guzheng player
- Qi Xin, author and member of the Chinese Communist Party, wife of Chinese communist revolutionary Xi Zhongxun and mother of Chinese Communist Party General Secretary and Chinese President Xi Jinping
