= Sanmenxia =

Sanmenxia 三门峡市 Sanmenhsia
- Prefecture-level city
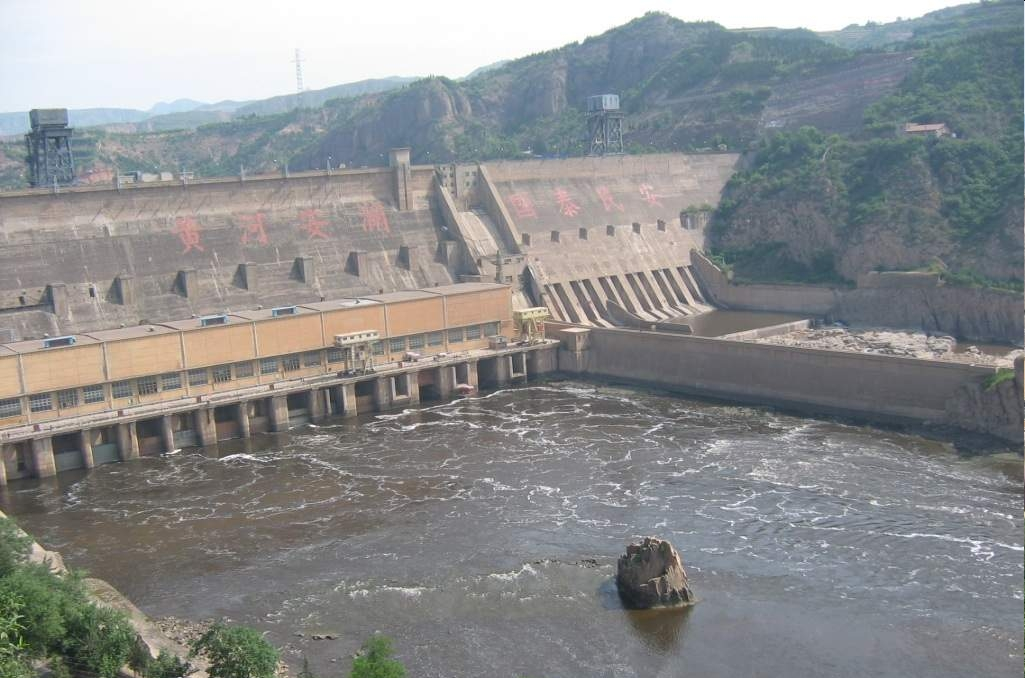
- Sanmenxia Dam

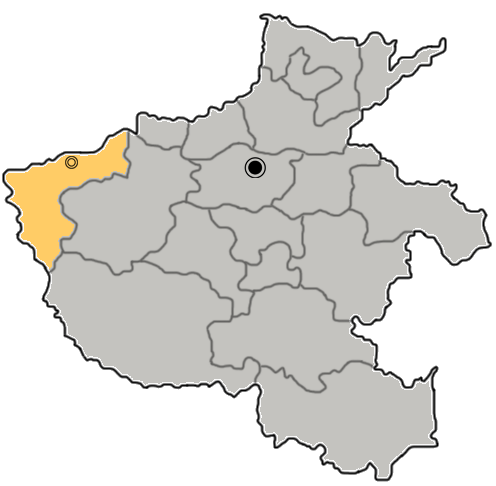
- Location of Sanmenxia City jurisdiction in Henan

- Location in China
- Coordinates (Sanmenxia government): 34°46′24″N 111°12′01″E
- Country: People's Republic of China
- Province: Henan
- Municipal seat: Hubin District

Area
  - Prefecture-level city: 10,475 km^{2} (4,044 sq mi)
  - Urban: 1,814.3 km^{2} (700.5 sq mi)
  - Metro: 2,995.3 km^{2} (1,156.5 sq mi)
- Elevation: 376 m (1,234 ft)

Population (2020 census)
  - Prefecture-level city: 2,034,872
  - Density: 194.26/km^{2} (503.13/sq mi)
  - Urban: 615,220
  - Urban density: 339.09/km^{2} (878.25/sq mi)
  - Metro: 820,300
  - Metro density: 273.9/km^{2} (709.3/sq mi)

GDP
  - Prefecture-level city: CN¥ 132.6 billion US$ 20.0 billion
  - Per capita: CN¥ 58,894; US$ 8,867
- Time zone: UTC+8 (China Standard)
- Postal Code: 472000
- Area code: (0)398
- ISO 3166 code: CN-HA-12
- Major Ethnicities: Han
- County-level divisions: 6
- License plate prefixes: 豫M
- Website: smx.gov.cn

Sanmenxia (simplified Chinese: 三门峡; traditional Chinese: 三門峽; pinyin: Sānménxiá; postal: Sanmenhsia) is a prefecture-level city in the west of Henan Province, China. The westernmost prefecture-level city in Henan, Sanmenxia borders Luoyang to the east, Nanyang to the southeast, Shaanxi Province to the west and Shanxi Province to the north. The city lies on the south side of the Yellow River at the point where the river cuts through the Loess Plateau on its way to the North China Plain.

As of the 2020 census, it was home to 2,034,872 inhabitants of which 820,300 lived in the built-up area made of Hubin, Shanzhou urban districts and Pinglu County in neighboring Shanxi (205,080 inhabitants), now within the agglomeration.

== Names and history ==
The city's name in Chinese (三门峡) means "The Gorge of Three Gateways" and is derived from two islands that split the Yellow River into three parts.

According to Chinese mythology, Yu the Great used a divine axe to cut the mountain ridge three times, creating the Sanmenxia gorges to prevent massive flooding. The three "men" or gates were then named "The Gateway of Man" (人门), "The Gateway of Gods" (神门) and "The Gateway of Devils" (鬼门).

During the Western Zhou dynasty, Sanmenxia was part of the territory of the State of Western Guo, ruled by relatives of the ruling Ji family of Zhou. Guo moved its capital from modern day Baoji to Shangyang (上阳), next to Sanmenxia. Later, this territory was annexed the State of Jin.

During the Western Han and Tang dynasties, when the capital was in Chang'an, the grain tribute passed upstream through Sanmenxia. The rapids were dangerous, with losses ranging from 20% to 50% in the Tang dynasty, which was a reason for moving the capital to Luoyang. There were several unsuccessful projects to bypass the rapids with canals or remove boulders, and sometimes it was bypassed with roads. Starting in 150 AD, gallery roads were built for towpaths and repaired in following years.

With the construction of the Sanmenxia Dam in the late 1950s, the ancient passes started to become flooded. Archeologists intensely studied them before they were submerged.

Archaeological finds near Sanmenxia between 1956 and 1991 revealed mass chariot graves and bronzeware of Western Guo State rulers. Furthermore, the archaeological site "Shihao Section of Xiaohan Ancient Road", an excavated pathway that is part of the world heritage site "Silk Roads: the Routes Network of Chang'an-Tianshan Corridor", is also located in Sanmenxia. In 2011, the Sanmenxia Cultural Sports Centre Stadium opened. The association football venue has a capacity of 22,000.

== Geography and climate ==
Sanmenxia is located in western Henan on the southern (right) bank of the Yellow River, and is surrounded on three sides by mountains, with elevations generally increasing from northeast to southwest. Most of the prefecture is at an altitude of 300 to 1,500 metres (980 to 4,920 ft), although the highest peak in the province, at 2,413.8 metres (7,919 ft), is located in Lingbao. The prefecture is at the intersection of Henan, Shanxi, and Shaanxi provinces, bordering Luoyang to the east, Nanyang to the south, Weinan (Shaanxi) to the west, and Yuncheng (Shanxi) to the north across the Yellow River.

Sanmenxia has a mostly dry, monsoon-influenced continental climate with four seasons. Winters are moderately cold and very dry, while summers are hot and humid. Monthly daily average temperatures range from −0.3 °C (31.5 °F) in January to 26.4 °C (79.5 °F) in July, and the annual mean is 13.9 °C (57.0 °F). More than half of the annual precipitation falls from July to September. There are between 184 and 218 frost-free days per annum. In the Köppen system, the city is in the transition zone between a humid subtropical climate (Köppen Cwa) and humid continental climate (Köppen Dwa), and receives barely enough precipitation to avoid being semi-arid (Köppen BSk).

Climate data for Sanmenxia, elevation 410 m (1,350 ft), (1991–2020 normals, extremes 1971–present)
Month	Jan	Feb	Mar	Apr	May	Jun	Jul	Aug	Sep	Oct	Nov	Dec	Year
Record high °C (°F)	18.0 (64.4)	23.3 (73.9)	29.7 (85.5)	36.7 (98.1)	39.8 (103.6)	41.4 (106.5)	41.6 (106.9)	39.6 (103.3)	39.2 (102.6)	33.3 (91.9)	26.3 (79.3)	18.4 (65.1)	41.6 (106.9)
Mean daily maximum °C (°F)	5.2 (41.4)	9.4 (48.9)	15.6 (60.1)	22.6 (72.7)	27.4 (81.3)	31.5 (88.7)	32.4 (90.3)	30.7 (87.3)	25.8 (78.4)	20.3 (68.5)	12.9 (55.2)	6.6 (43.9)	20.0 (68.1)
Daily mean °C (°F)	0.1 (32.2)	3.8 (38.8)	9.5 (49.1)	16.1 (61.0)	21.1 (70.0)	25.4 (77.7)	27.0 (80.6)	25.5 (77.9)	20.5 (68.9)	14.6 (58.3)	7.5 (45.5)	1.6 (34.9)	14.4 (57.9)
Mean daily minimum °C (°F)	−3.7 (25.3)	−0.3 (31.5)	4.8 (40.6)	10.8 (51.4)	15.6 (60.1)	20.1 (68.2)	22.9 (73.2)	21.6 (70.9)	16.6 (61.9)	10.4 (50.7)	3.6 (38.5)	−2.0 (28.4)	10.0 (50.1)
Record low °C (°F)	−12.5 (9.5)	−10.9 (12.4)	−6.2 (20.8)	−0.4 (31.3)	4.7 (40.5)	12.4 (54.3)	15.8 (60.4)	12.8 (55.0)	6.5 (43.7)	−2.1 (28.2)	−8.0 (17.6)	−12.8 (9.0)	−12.8 (9.0)
Average precipitation mm (inches)	3.8 (0.15)	8.6 (0.34)	17.4 (0.69)	36.6 (1.44)	57.8 (2.28)	63.5 (2.50)	105.0 (4.13)	79.2 (3.12)	89.7 (3.53)	49.4 (1.94)	24.3 (0.96)	3.7 (0.15)	539 (21.23)
Average precipitation days (≥ 0.1 mm)	3.2	3.6	5.3	6.5	8.1	8.1	9.8	9.3	9.9	7.7	5.7	2.7	79.9
Average snowy days	4.4	3.9	1.5	0.2	0	0	0	0	0	0	1.7	3.1	14.8
Average relative humidity (%)	53	53	52	54	56	59	70	72	72	69	64	55	61
Mean monthly sunshine hours	143.3	136.5	170.1	202.5	220.5	216.2	208.5	190.0	147.5	148.6	140.3	145.5	2,069.5
Percentage possible sunshine	46	44	46	51	51	50	48	46	40	43	46	48	47
Source 1: China Meteorological Administration all-time January high
Source 2: Weather China

== Administration ==
The prefecture-level city of Sanmenxia administers two districts, two county-level cities and two counties.

- Hubin District (湖滨区)
- Shanzhou District (陕州区)
- Lingbao City (灵宝市)
- Yima City (义马市)
- Lushi County (卢氏县)
- Mianchi County (渑池县)

Map
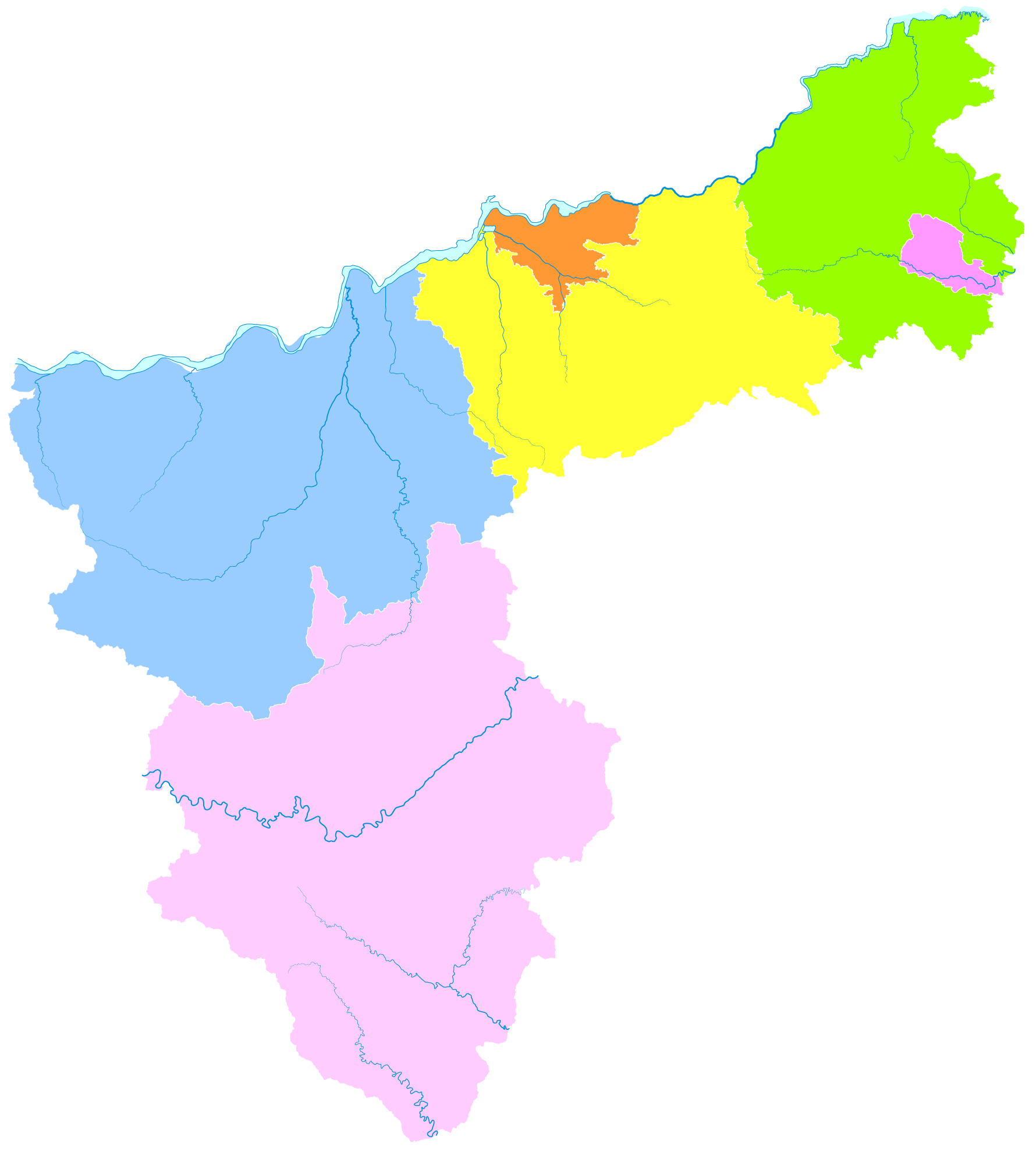

== Transportation ==
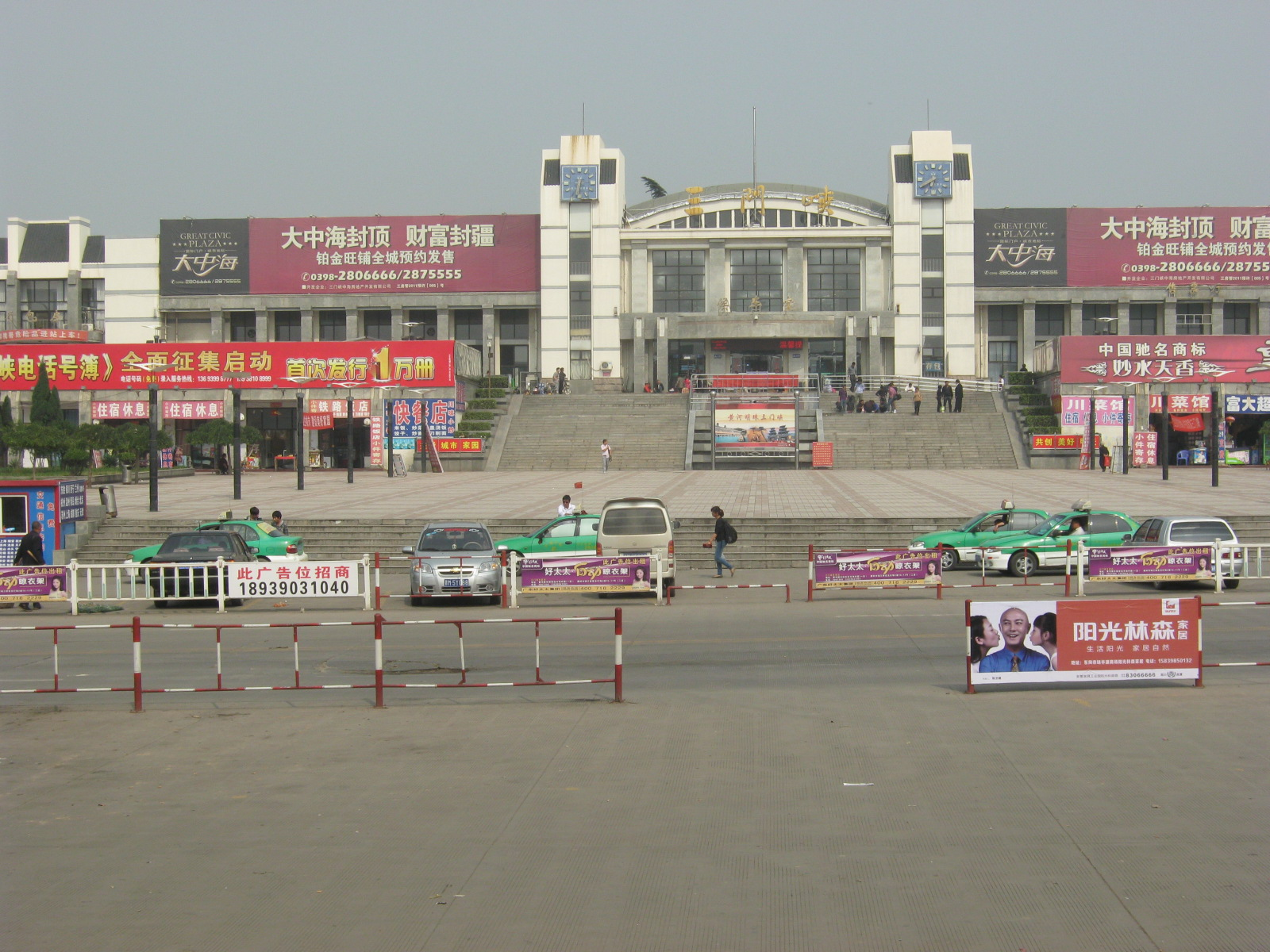
Sanmenxia Railway Station

- China National Highway 209
- China National Highway 310

== Notable people ==
- Gao Jixing, founding prince of Jingnan during the Five Dynasties and Ten Kingdoms period of China
- Hao Pengju, Chinese general and politician
- Zhang Zifeng, actress
