= List of rural localities in Astrakhan Oblast =

Map of Russia with Astrakhan Oblast highlighted

This is a list of rural localities in Astrakhan Oblast, organized by district.

Astrakhan Oblast (Russian: Астраха́нская о́бласть, Astrakhanskaya oblast) is a federal subject of Russia (an oblast) located in southern Russia. Its administrative center is the city of Astrakhan. As of the 2010 Census, its population was 1,010,073.

== Akhtubinsky District ==
Rural localities in Akhtubinsky District:

- Batayevka
- Bogdo
- Bolkhuny
- Butyrki
- Dmitriyevka
- Dubovy
- Duyunov
- Dzhelga
- Gromov
- Kamnev
- Kapustin Yar
- Klochkov
- Kochevaya
- Kononenko
- Korochin
- Lopin
- Martovsky
- Nikonov
- Novo-Nikolayevka
- Pirogovka
- Pokrovka
- Pologoye Zaymishche
- Rogozin
- Rozhdestvenka
- Sadovoye
- Shunguli
- Sokor
- Sokrutovka
- Solonchak
- Solyanka
- Sredny Baskunchak
- Stasov
- Tokarev
- Udachnoye
- Uspenka
- Verblyuzhy
- Zelyony Sad
- Zolotukha

== Chernoyarsky District ==
Rural localities in Chernoyarsky District:

- Baranovka
- Bundin
- Chyorny Yar
- Kalnovka
- Kamenny Yar
- Pody
- Razdolny
- Solodniki
- Solyonoye Zaymishche
- Stupino
- Ushakovka
- Zelyony Sad
- Zubovka

== Ikryaninsky District ==
Rural localities in Ikryaninsky District:

- Algaza
- Bakhtemir
- Beketovka
- Borkino
- Dzhamba
- Fyodorovka
- Gusinoye
- Ikryanoye
- Karabulak
- Khmelevoy
- Krasa
- Mayachnoye
- Mumra
- Ninovka
- Novo-Bulgary
- Oranzherei
- Ozernoye
- Petrovsky
- Posyolok Anatoliya Zvereva
- Sedlistoye
- Sergino
- Sergiyevka
- Staro-Volzhsky
- Svetloye
- Tovarny
- Troitsky
- Trudfront
- Vakhromeyevo
- Vostochnoye
- Yamnoye
- Zhitnoye
- Zyuzino

== Kamyzyaksky District ==
Rural localities in Kamyzyaksky District:

- Alexeyevka
- Arshin
- Azovsky
- Barany Bugor
- Biryuchek
- Chagan
- Chapayevo
- Damchik
- Forpost
- Gandurino
- Grushevo
- Ivanchug
- Kachkarinsky
- Karalat
- Karaulnoye
- Kaspy
- Khmelyovka
- Komarovka
- Lebyazhye
- Moryakov
- Nikolayevsky
- Nikolskoye
- Nizhnekalinovsky
- Nizhnenikolsky
- Novinsky
- Obrastsovo-Travino
- Obukhovsky
- Parygino
- Razdor
- Revin Khutor
- Samosdelka
- Semibugry
- Sizova Griva
- Stanya
- Trekhizbinka
- Tuzukley
- Uspekh
- Uvary
- Verkhnekalinovsky
- Yamana
- Zastenka
- Zaton
- Zhan-Aul

== Kharabalinsky District ==
Rural localities in Kharabalinsky District:

- Akhtubinka
- Ashuluk
- Bugor
- Dedushkin
- Gremuchy
- Khosheutovo
- Kochkovatka
- Mikhaylovka
- Rechnoye
- Sasykoli
- Sazany Ugol
- Selitrennoye
- Seroglazovo
- Tambovka
- Volnoye
- Zavolzhskoye
- Zelyonyye Prudy

== Krasnoyarsky District ==
Rural localities in Krasnoyarsky District:

- Alcha
- Allaysky
- Aysapay
- Bakharevsky
- Baklanye
- Baranovka
- Baybek
- Bely Ilmen
- Belyachy
- Buzan
- Buzan-pristan
- Buzan-razezd
- Cheryomukha
- Delta
- Dolginsky
- Dosang
- Dzhanay
- Karaozek
- Komsomolsky
- Kondakovka
- Koshelevka
- Krasny Yar
- Krivoy Buzan
- Kuyanly
- Maly Aral
- Mayachnoye
- Novourusovka
- Pereprava Korsaka
- Pervomaysky
- Podchalyk
- Priozerny
- Seitovka
- Solnechny
- Starourusovka
- Stepnoy
- Talnikovy
- Topal
- Vatazhnoye
- Verkhny Buzan
- Vishnyovy
- Vorobyevsky
- Vyatskoye
- Yasyn-Sokan
- Zabuzan
- Zaykovka

== Limansky District ==
Rural localities in Limansky District:

- Basinsk
- Basta
- Basy
- Biryuchya Kosa
- Budarino
- Dalneye
- Kamyshovo
- Karavannoye
- Kryazhevoye
- Lesnoye
- Mikhaylovka
- Novogeorgiyevsk
- Oleynikovo
- Olya
- Peschanoye
- Promyslovka
- Protochnoye
- Rynok
- Sudachye
- Voskresenovka
- Vyshka
- Yandyki
- Yar-Bazar
- Zaburunnoye
- Zarechnoye
- Zenzeli
- Zheleznodorozhnogo razezda №6
- Zorino

== Narimanovsky District ==
Rural localities in Narimanovsky District:

- Baranovka
- Barkhany
- Bishtyubinka
- Buruny
- Drofiny
- Dzhurak
- Karaagash
- Kovylny
- Krasnopeschany
- Kurchenko
- Lineynaya
- Lineynoye
- Mezhozyorny
- Mirny
- Nikolayevka
- Nitzan
- Nizhnelebyazhye
- Novokucherganovka
- Ostrov Dolgy
- Petropavlovka
- Prigorodny
- Prikaspiysky
- Rassvet
- Raznochinovka
- Rychansky
- Saygachny
- Sennoy
- Solyanka
- Solyony
- Starokucherganovka
- Tinaki
- Trusovo
- Tulata
- Tuluganovka
- Turkmenka
- Verkhnelebyazhye
- Volzhskoye
- Yango-Asker

== Privolzhsky District ==
Rural localities in Privolzhsky District:

- Assadulayevo
- Atal
- Biryukovka
- Boldinsky
- Bushma
- Chilimny
- Erle
- Funtovo-1
- Funtovo-2
- Ivanovsky
- Kaftanka
- Karagali
- Kilinchi
- Kinelle
- Kirpichnogo zavoda 1
- Kizan
- Kulakovka
- Kulpa
- Mansur
- Nachalovo
- Nartovsky
- Novonachalovsky
- Novy Kutum
- Osypnoy Bugor
- Pervoye Maya
- Polyana
- Poymenny
- Pridorozhny
- Rastopulovka
- Sadovy
- Steklozavoda
- Tatarskaya Bashmakovka
- Tri Protoka
- Vesyolaya Griva
- Vodyanovka
- Yaksatovo
- Yevpraksino

== Volodarsky District ==
Rural localities in Volodarsky District

- Aktyube
- Alexeyevka
- Altynzhar
- Baranovka
- Beregovoy
- Blinovo
- Boldyrevo
- Bolshoy Mogoy
- Churkin
- Chyorny Bugor
- Dianovka
- Forpost Starovatazhensky
- Goszapovednika
- Ilyinka
- Kalinino
- Kamardan
- Kazenny Bugor
- Konny Mogoy
- Korni
- Korovye
- Koshevanka
- Kostybe
- Kozlovo
- Krasny
- Krutoye
- Kudrino
- Kzyl-Tan
- Lebyazhye
- Makovo
- Maly Mogoy
- Marfino
- Meneshau
- Meshkovo
- Multanovo
- Narimanovo
- Nizhnyaya Sultanovka
- Novinka
- Novokrasnoye
- Novomayachnoye
- Novovasilyevo
- Novy Rychan
- Paromny
- Plotovinka
- Razdor
- Razino
- Sakhma
- Samoylovsky
- Sarmantayevka
- Shagano-Kondakovka
- Sizy Bugor
- Sorochye
- Srednyaya Sultanovka
- Stary Altynzhar
- Stolbovoy
- Talovinka
- Tishkovo
- Trubny
- Tsvetnoye
- Tuluganovka
- Tumak
- Tyurino
- Vatazhka
- Verkhniye Kolki
- Vinny
- Volodarsky
- Yablonka
- Yamnoye
- Yegin-Aul
- Zelenga
- Zelyony Ostrov

== Yenotayevsky District ==
Rural localities in Yenotayevsky District:

- Beregovoy
- Bloshnoy
- Fyodorovka
- Grachi
- Iki-Chibirsky
- Ivanovka
- Kopanovka
- Kosika
- Kozinka
- Lenino
- Mikhaylovka
- Nikolayevka
- Nikolskoye
- Novostroy
- Posyolok Gospitomnika
- Pribrezhny
- Prishib
- Promyslovy
- Seroglazka
- Tabun-Aral
- Vetlyanka
- Vladimirovka
- Volzhsky
- Vostok
- Yekaterinovka
- Yenotayevka
- Zamyany

== See also ==
- Lists of rural localities in Russia
