= Kuyanly =

Kuyanly Куянлы
- Selo
- Location within Astrakhan Oblast Location within Russia
- Coordinates: 46°46′N 47°58′E
- Country: Russia
- Region: Astrakhan Oblast
- District: Krasnoyarsky District
- Time zone: UTC+4:00

Kuyanly (Russian: Куянлы) is a rural locality (a selo) in Seitovsky Selsoviet, Krasnoyarsky District, Astrakhan Oblast, Russia. The population was 2 as of 2010. There are 3 streets.

== Geography ==
Kuyanly is located 67 km northwest of Krasny Yar (the district's administrative centre) by road. Aysapay is the nearest rural locality.
