= Rozhdestvenka, Astrakhan Oblast =

Rozhdestvenka Рождественка
- Selo
- Location within Astrakhan Oblast Location within Russia
- Coordinates: 48°05′N 46°21′E
- Country: Russia
- Region: Astrakhan Oblast
- District: Akhtubinsky District
- Time zone: UTC+4:00

Rozhdestvenka (Russian: Рождественка) is a rural locality (a selo) in Batayevsky Selsoviet of Akhtubinsky District, Astrakhan Oblast, Russia. The population was 5 as of 2010.

== Geography ==
It is located 20 km south-east from Akhtubinsk.
