= Raznochinovka =

Raznochinovka Разночиновка
- Selo
- Location within Astrakhan Oblast Location within Russia
- Coordinates: 46°38′N 47°54′E
- Country: Russia
- Region: Astrakhan Oblast
- District: Narimanovsky District
- Time zone: UTC+4:00

Raznochinovka (Russian: Разночиновка) is a rural locality (a selo) and the administrative center of Raznochinovsky Selsoviet, Narimanovsky District, Astrakhan Oblast, Russia. The population was 1,632 as of 2010. There are 33 streets.

== Geography ==
Raznochinovka is located on the Volga River, 91 km southeast of Narimanov (the district's administrative centre) by road. Volzhskoye is the nearest rural locality.
