= Sakhma =

Sakhma Сахма
- Selo
- Location within Astrakhan Oblast Location within Russia
- Coordinates: 46°14′N 48°27′E
- Country: Russia
- Region: Astrakhan Oblast
- District: Volodarsky District
- Time zone: UTC+4:00

Sakhma (Russian: Сахма) is a rural locality (a selo) in Sizobugorsky Selsoviet of Volodarsky District, Astrakhan Oblast, Russia. The population was 379 as of 2010. There are 3 streets.

== Geography ==
Sakhma is located 30 km (19 mi) south of Volodarsky (the district's administrative centre) by road. Plotovinka is the nearest rural locality.
