= Bely Ilmen =

Bely Ilmen Белый Ильмень
- Settlement
- Location within Astrakhan Oblast Location within Russia
- Coordinates: 46°26′N 48°15′E
- Country: Russia
- Region: Astrakhan Oblast
- District: Krasnoyarsky District
- Time zone: UTC+4:00

Bely Ilmen (Russian: Белый Ильмень) is a rural locality (a settlement) in Zabuzansky Selsoviet, Krasnoyarsky District, Astrakhan Oblast, Russia. The population was 86 as of 2010. There are 7 streets.

== Geography ==
Bely Ilmen is located 14 km southwest of Krasny Yar (the district's administrative centre) by road. Vinny is the nearest rural locality.
