= Oranzherei =

Oranzherei Оранжереи
- Selo
- Location within Astrakhan Oblast Location within Russia
- Coordinates: 45°50′N 47°33′E
- Country: Russia
- Region: Astrakhan Oblast
- District: Ikryaninsky District
- Time zone: UTC+4:00

Oranzherei (Russian: Оранжереи) is a rural locality (a selo) and the administrative center of Oranzhereininsky Selsoviet in Ikryaninsky District, Astrakhan Oblast, Russia. The population was 4,473 as of 2010. There are 23 streets.

== Geography ==
Oranzherei is located 34 km south of Ikryanoye (the district's administrative centre) by road. Sudachye is the nearest rural locality.
