= Karaagash =

Karaagash Караагаш
- Settlement
- Location within Astrakhan Oblast Location within Russia
- Coordinates: 46°28′N 47°59′E
- Country: Russia
- Region: Astrakhan Oblast
- District: Narimanovsky District
- Time zone: UTC+4:00

Karaagash (Russian: Караагаш) is a rural locality (a settlement) in Akhmatovsky Selsoviet, Narimanovsky District, Astrakhan Oblast, Russia. The population was 239 as of 2010. There are 10 streets.

== Geography ==
It is located on the Volga River, 66 km south of Narimanov (the district's administrative centre) by road. Tinaki 2-ye is the nearest rural locality.
