= Nizhnelebyazhye =

Nizhnelebyazhye Нижнелебяжье
- Selo
- Location within Astrakhan Oblast Location within Russia
- Coordinates: 46°41′N 47°53′E
- Country: Russia
- Region: Astrakhan Oblast
- District: Narimanovsky District
- Time zone: UTC+4:00

Nizhnelebyazhye (Russian: Нижнелебяжье) is a rural locality (a selo) in Raznochinovsky Selsoviet, Narimanovsky District, Astrakhan Oblast, Russia. The population was 225 as of 2010. There are 4 streets.

== Geography ==
Nizhnelebyazhye is located on the Volga River, 95 km east of Narimanov (the district's administrative centre) by road. Narimanov is the nearest rural locality.
