= Kochevaya =

Kochevaya Кочевая
- Settlement
- Location within Astrakhan Oblast Location within Russia
- Coordinates: 48°15′N 46°26′E
- Country: Russia
- Region: Astrakhan Oblast
- District: Akhtubinsky District
- Time zone: UTC+4:00

Kochevaya (Russian: Кочевая) is a rural locality (a settlement) in "Gorod Akthubinsk" of Akhtubinsky District, Astrakhan Oblast, Russia. The population was 13 as of 2010.

== Geography ==
It is located 244 km from Astrakhan, 19 km from Akhtubinsk.
