= Karalat =

Karalat Каралат
- Selo
- Location within Astrakhan Oblast Location within Russia
- Coordinates: 45°54′N 48°18′E
- Country: Russia
- Region: Astrakhan Oblast
- District: Kamyzyaksky District
- Time zone: UTC+4:00

Karalat (Russian: Каралат) is a rural locality (a selo) and the administrative center of Karalatsky Selsoviet, Kamyzyaksky District, Astrakhan Oblast, Russia. The population was 1,156 as of 2010. There are 24 streets.

== Geography ==
Karalat is located 34 km southeast of Kamyzyak (the district's administrative centre) by road. Chapayevo and Parygino are the nearest rural localities.
