= Stary Altynzhar =

Stary Altynzhar Старый Алтынжар
- Settlement
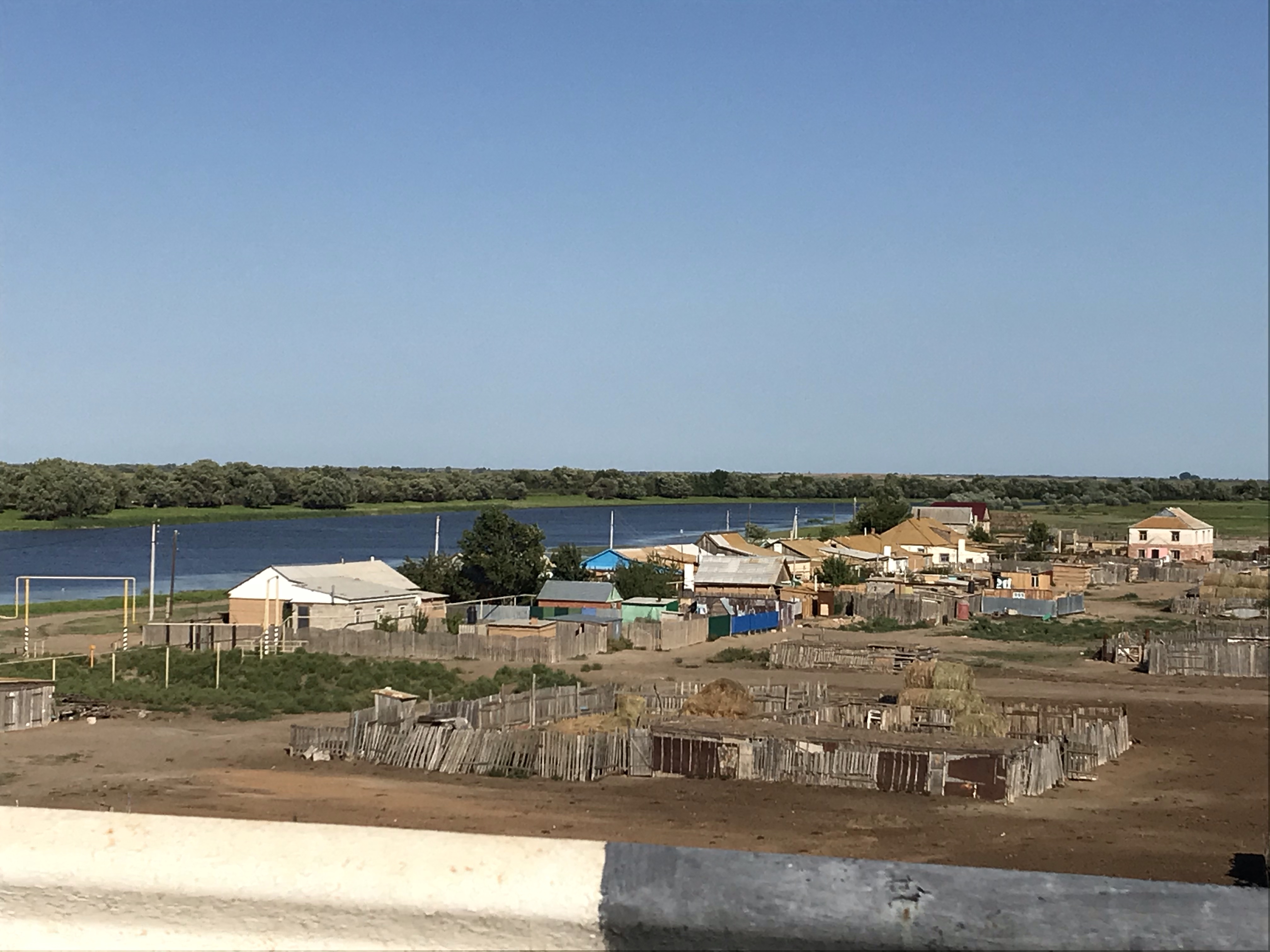
- Stary Altynzhar as seen from the bridge across the Kamardan

- Location within Astrakhan Oblast Location within Russia
- Coordinates: 46°19′N 48°29′E
- Country: Russia
- Region: Astrakhan Oblast
- District: Volodarsky District
- Time zone: UTC+4:00

Stary Altynzhar (Russian: Старый Алтынжар) is a rural locality (a settlement) in Novinsky Selsoviet of Volodarsky District, Astrakhan Oblast, Russia. The population was 102 as of 2010. There is 1 street.

== Geography ==
Stary Altynzhar is located 12 km (7.5 mi) southwest of Volodarsky (the district's administrative centre) by road. Tuluganovka is the nearest rural locality.
