= Bundin =

Bundin Бундин
- Khutor
- Location within Astrakhan Oblast Location within Russia
- Coordinates: 48°25′N 45°26′E
- Country: Russia
- Region: Astrakhan Oblast
- District: Chernoyarsky District
- Time zone: UTC+4:00

Bundin (Russian: Бундин) is a rural locality (a khutor) in Kamennoyarsky Selsoviet, Chernoyarsky District, Astrakhan Oblast, Russia. The population was 22 as of 2010. There are 3 streets.

== Geography ==
Bundin is located on the Volga River, 86 km northwest of Chyorny Yar (the district's administrative centre) by road. Kamenny Yar is the nearest rural locality.
