= Nartovsky =

Nartovsky Нартовский
- Settlement
- Location within Astrakhan Oblast Location within Russia
- Coordinates: 46°10′N 48°02′E
- Country: Russia
- Region: Astrakhan Oblast
- District: Privolzhsky District
- Time zone: UTC+4:00

Nartovsky (Russian: Нартовский) is a rural locality (a settlement) in Yaksatovsky Selsoviet, Privolzhsky District, Astrakhan Oblast, Russia. The population was 424 as of 2010. There are 5 streets.

== Geography ==
It is located on the Kizan River, 38 km southwest of Nachalovo (the district's administrative centre) by road. Atal is the nearest rural locality.
