= Verkhnelebyazhye =

Verkhnelebyazhye Верхнелебяжье
- Selo
- Location within Astrakhan Oblast Location within Russia
- Coordinates: 46°45′N 47°48′E
- Country: Russia
- Region: Astrakhan Oblast
- District: Narimanovsky District
- Time zone: UTC+4:00

Verkhnelebyazhye (Russian: Верхнелебяжье) is a rural locality (a selo) in Volzhsky Selsoviet, Narimanovsky District, Astrakhan Oblast, Russia. The population was 361 as of 2010. There are 14 streets.

== Geography ==
Verkhnelebyazhye is located 13 km north of Narimanov (the district's administrative centre) by road. Narimanov is the nearest rural locality.
