= Lineynaya =

Lineynaya Линейная
- Railway station
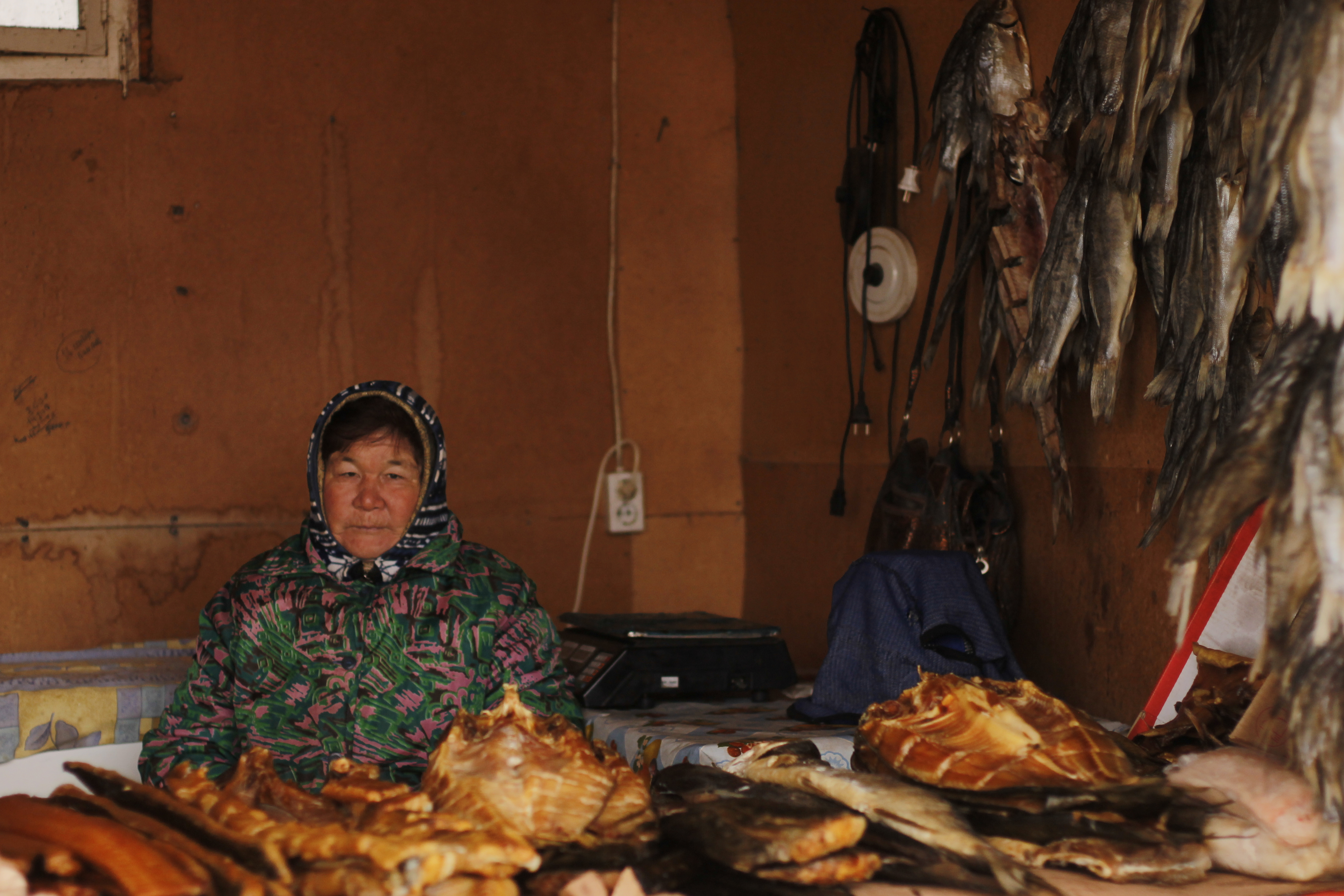
- A fish seller in Lineynaya

- Location within Astrakhan Oblast Location within Russia
- Coordinates: 46°15′N 47°25′E
- Country: Russia
- Region: Astrakhan Oblast
- District: Narimanovsky District
- Time zone: UTC+4:00

Lineynaya (Russian: Линейная) is a rural locality (a railway station) in Lineyninsky Selsoviet, Narimanovsky District, Astrakhan Oblast, Russia. The population was 561 as of 2010.

== Geography ==
It is located 57 km from Astrakhan, 88 km from Narimanov.
