= Khmelevoy =

Khmelevoy Хмелевой
- Settlement
- Location within Astrakhan Oblast Location within Russia
- Coordinates: 45°49′N 47°34′E
- Country: Russia
- Region: Astrakhan Oblast
- District: Ikryaninsky District
- Time zone: UTC+4:00

Khmelevoy (Russian: Хмелевой) is a rural locality (a settlement) in Ikryaninsky District, Astrakhan Oblast, Russia. The population was 371 as of 2010. There are 7 streets.

== Geography ==
Khmelevoy is located 36 km south of Ikryanoye (the district's administrative centre) by road. Vakhromeyevo is the nearest rural locality.
