= Sorochye =

Sorochye Сорочье
- Selo
- Location within Astrakhan Oblast Location within Russia
- Coordinates: 46°15′N 48°42′E
- Country: Russia
- Region: Astrakhan Oblast
- District: Volodarsky District
- Time zone: UTC+4:00

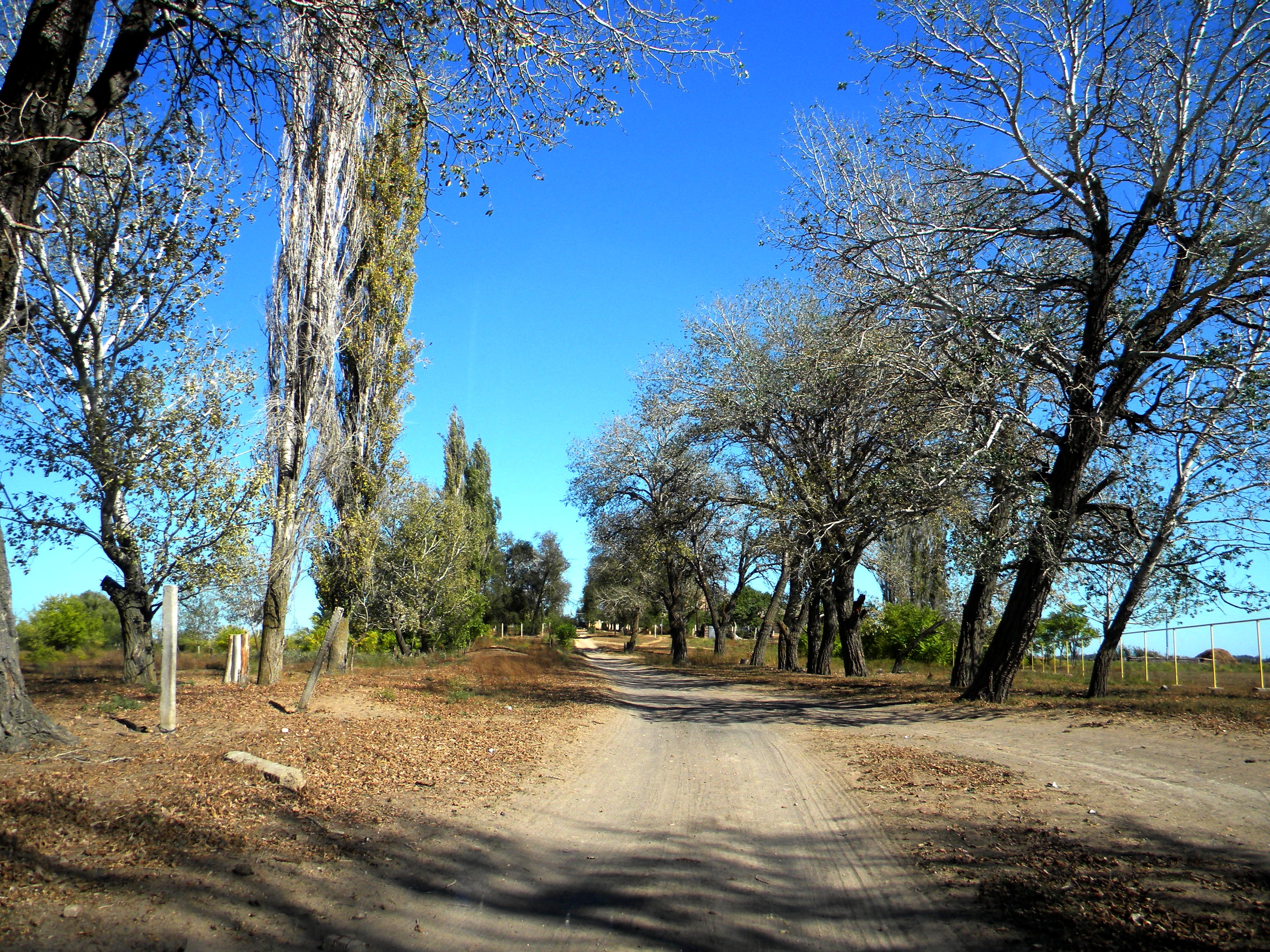
The road to the village of Sorochye, Volodar district

Sorochye (Russian: Сорочье) is a rural locality (a selo) in Tsvetnovsky Selsoviet of Volodarsky District, Astrakhan Oblast, Russia. The population was 945 as of 2010. There are 4 streets.

== Geography ==
Sorochye is located 28 km (17 mi) southeast of Volodarsky (the district's administrative centre) by road. Kazenny Bugor is the nearest rural locality.
