= Plotovinka =

Plotovinka Плотовинка
- Settlement
- Location within Astrakhan Oblast Location within Russia
- Coordinates: 46°13′N 48°29′E
- Country: Russia
- Region: Astrakhan Oblast
- District: Volodarsky District
- Time zone: UTC+4:00

Plotovinka (Russian: Плотовинка) is a rural locality (a settlement) in Sizobugorsky Selsoviet of Volodarsky District, Astrakhan Oblast, Russia. The population was 175 as of 2010. There are 2 streets.

== Geography ==
It is located on the Bushma River, 28 km (17 mi) south of Volodarsky (the district's administrative centre) by road. Sizy Bugor is the nearest rural locality.
