= Verkhny Buzan =

Verkhny Buzan Верхний Бузан
- Settlement
- Location within Astrakhan Oblast Location within Russia
- Coordinates: 46°37′N 48°09′E
- Country: Russia
- Region: Astrakhan Oblast
- District: Krasnoyarsky District
- Time zone: UTC+4:00

Verkhny Buzan (Russian: Верхний Бузан) is a rural locality (a settlement) in Buzansky Selsoviet, Krasnoyarsky District, Astrakhan Oblast, Russia. The population was 1,826 as of 2010. There are 14 streets.

== Geography ==
Verkhny Buzan is located 39 km northwest of Krasny Yar (the district's administrative centre) by road. Shmagino is the nearest rural locality.
