= Novovasilyevo =

Novovasilyevo Нововасильево
- Selo
- Location within Astrakhan Oblast Location within Russia
- Coordinates: 46°16′N 48°48′E
- Country: Russia
- Region: Astrakhan Oblast
- District: Volodarsky District
- Time zone: UTC+4:00

Novovasilyevo (Russian: Нововасильево) is a rural locality (a selo) in Volodarsky District, Astrakhan Oblast, Russia. The population was 409 as of 2010. There are 14 streets.

== Geography ==
Novovasilyevo is located 33 km (21 mi) southeast of Volodarsky (the district's administrative centre) by road. Blinovo is the nearest rural locality.
