= Sizova Griva =

Sizova Griva Сизова Грива
- Settlement
- Location within Astrakhan Oblast Location within Russia
- Coordinates: 46°05′N 48°23′E
- Country: Russia
- Region: Astrakhan Oblast
- District: Kamyzyaksky District
- Time zone: UTC+4:00

Sizova Griva (Russian: Сизова Грива) is a rural locality (a settlement) in Novotuzukleysky Selsoviet, Kamyzyaksky District, Astrakhan Oblast, Russia. The population was 129 as of 2010. There is 1 street.

== Geography ==
Sizova Griva is located 39 km east of Kamyzyak (the district's administrative centre) by road. Tuzukley is the nearest rural locality.
