= Forpost Starovatazhensky =

Forpost Starovatazhensky Форпост Староватаженский
- Selo
- Location within Astrakhan Oblast Location within Russia
- Coordinates: 46°01′N 48°35′E
- Country: Russia
- Region: Astrakhan Oblast
- District: Volodarsky District
- Time zone: UTC+4:00

Forpost Starovatazhensky (Russian: Форпост Староватаженский) is a rural locality (a selo) in Tishkovsky Selsoviet of Volodarsky District, Astrakhan Oblast, Russia. The population was 281 as of 2010. There is 1 street.

== Geography ==
Forpost Starovatazhensky is located 109 km (68 mi) south of Volodarsky (the district's administrative centre) by road. Tishkovo is the nearest rural locality.
