= Kamyshovo =

Kamyshovo Камышово
- Selo
- Location within Astrakhan Oblast Location within Russia
- Coordinates: 45°56′N 47°27′E
- Country: Russia
- Region: Astrakhan Oblast
- District: Limansky District
- Time zone: UTC+4:00

Kamyshovo (Russian: Камышово) is a rural locality (a selo) and the administrative center of Kamyshovsky Selsoviet, Limansky District, Astrakhan Oblast, Russia. The population was 654 as of 2010. There are 4 streets.

== Geography ==
Kamyshovo is located 35 km northeast of Liman (the district's administrative centre) by road. Yar-Bazar is the nearest rural locality.
