= Uvary =

Uvary Увары
- Selo
- Location within Astrakhan Oblast Location within Russia
- Coordinates: 46°02′N 48°02′E
- Country: Russia
- Region: Astrakhan Oblast
- District: Kamyzyaksky District
- Time zone: UTC+4:00

Uvary (Russian: Увары) is a rural locality (a selo) in Kamyzyaksky District, Astrakhan Oblast, Russia. The population was 1,034 as of 2010. There are 13 streets.

== Geography ==
It is located on the Uvary River, 12 km south of Kamyzyak (the district's administrative centre) by road. Uspekh is the nearest rural locality.
