= Novomayachnoye =

Novomayachnoye Новомаячное
- Selo
- Location within Astrakhan Oblast Location within Russia
- Coordinates: 46°25′N 48°51′E
- Country: Russia
- Region: Astrakhan Oblast
- District: Volodarsky District
- Time zone: UTC+4:00

Novomayachnoye (Russian: Новомаячное) is a rural locality (a selo) in Novokrasinsky Selsoviet of Volodarsky District, Astrakhan Oblast, Russia. The population was 295 as of 2010. There are 3 streets.

== Geography ==
Novomayachnoye is located 27 km (17 mi) east of Volodarsky (the district's administrative centre) by road. Novokrasnoye is the nearest rural locality.
