= Kamardan =

Kamardan Камардан
- Settlement
- Location within Astrakhan Oblast Location within Russia
- Coordinates: 46°16′N 48°33′E
- Country: Russia
- Region: Astrakhan Oblast
- District: Volodarsky District
- Time zone: UTC+4:00

Kamardan (Russian: Камардан) is a rural locality (a settlement) in Altynzharsky Selsoviet of Volodarsky District, Astrakhan Oblast, Russia. The population was 649 as of 2010. There are 8 streets.

== Geography ==
Kamardan is located on the Kamardan River, 22 km (14 mi) south of Volodarsky (the district's administrative centre) by road. Novinka is the nearest rural locality.
