= Krasnopeschany =

Krasnopeschany Краснопесчаный
- Settlement
- Location within Astrakhan Oblast Location within Russia
- Coordinates: 46°38′N 47°25′E
- Country: Russia
- Region: Astrakhan Oblast
- District: Narimanovsky District
- Time zone: UTC+4:00

Krasnopeschany (Russian: Краснопесчаный) is a rural locality (a settlement) in Volzhsky Selsoviet, Narimanovsky District, Astrakhan Oblast, Russia. The population was 58 as of 2010.

== Geography ==
Krasnopeschany is located 29 km west of Narimanov (the district's administrative centre) by road.
