= Yegin-Aul =

Yegin-Aul Егин-Аул
- Selo
- Location within Astrakhan Oblast Location within Russia
- Coordinates: 46°16′N 48°31′E
- Country: Russia
- Region: Astrakhan Oblast
- District: Volodarsky District
- Time zone: UTC+4:00

Yegin-Aul (Russian: Егин-Аул) is a rural locality (a selo) in Altynzharsky Selsoviet of Volodarsky District, Astrakhan Oblast, Russia. The population was 185 as of 2010. There are 2 streets.

== Geography ==
Yegin-Aul is located on the Kamardan River, 19 km (12 mi) south of Volodarsky (the district's administrative centre) by road. Novinka is the nearest rural locality.
