= Bloshnoy =

Bloshnoy Блошной
- Khutor
- Location within Astrakhan Oblast Location within Russia
- Coordinates: 47°03′N 47°24′E
- Country: Russia
- Region: Astrakhan Oblast
- District: Yenotayevsky District
- Time zone: UTC+4:00

Bloshnoy (Russian: Блошной) is a rural locality (a khutor) in Tabun-Aralsky Selsoviet of Yenotayevsky District, Astrakhan Oblast, Russia. The population was 3 as of 2010.

== Geography ==
It is located 34 km south-east from Yenotayevka.
