= Dzhelga =

Dzhelga Джелга
- Settlement
- Location within Astrakhan Oblast Location within Russia
- Coordinates: 48°14′N 46°12′E
- Country: Russia
- Region: Astrakhan Oblast
- District: Akhtubinsky District
- Time zone: UTC+4:00

Dzhelga (Russian: Джелга) is a rural locality (a settlement) in Gorod Akhtubinsk, Akhtubinsky District, Astrakhan Oblast, Russia. The population was 37 as of 2010. There are 11 streets.

== Geography ==
Dzhelga is located 9 km (5.6 mi) southeast of Akhtubinsk (the district's administrative centre) by road. Akhtubinsk is the nearest rural locality.
