= Novy Rychan =

Novy Rychan Новый Рычан
- Selo
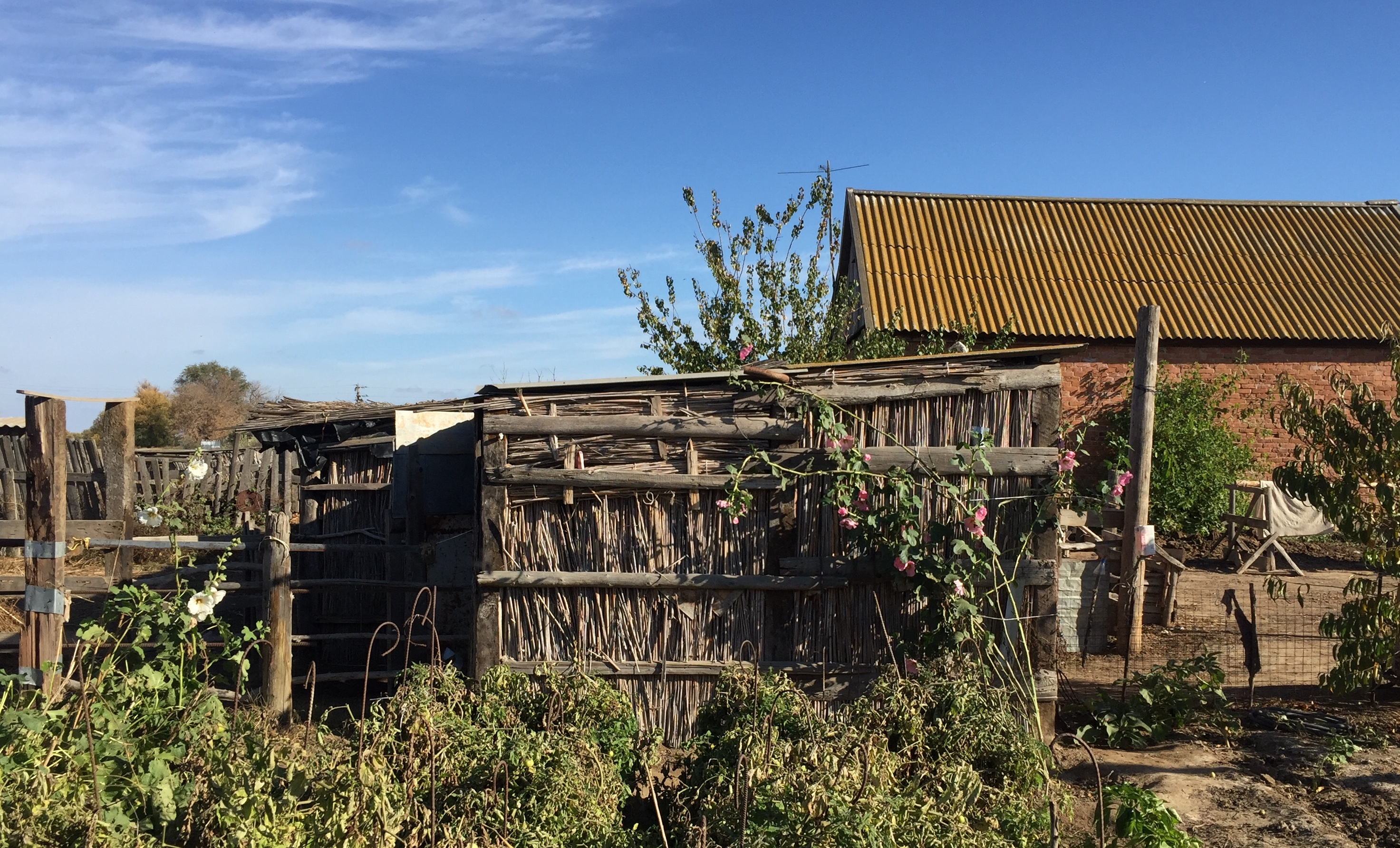
- Image of the community

- Location within Astrakhan Oblast Location within Russia
- Coordinates: 46°22′N 48°21′E
- Country: Russia
- Region: Astrakhan Oblast
- District: Volodarsky District
- Time zone: UTC+4:00

Novy Rychan (Russian: Новый Рычан) is a rural locality (a selo) and the administrative center of Khutorskoy Selsoviet of Volodarsky District, Astrakhan Oblast, Russia. The population was 997 as of 2010. There are 20 streets.

== Geography ==
Novy Rychan is located 23 km (14 mi) west of Volodarsky (the district's administrative centre) by road. Razdor is the nearest rural locality.

== Gallery ==
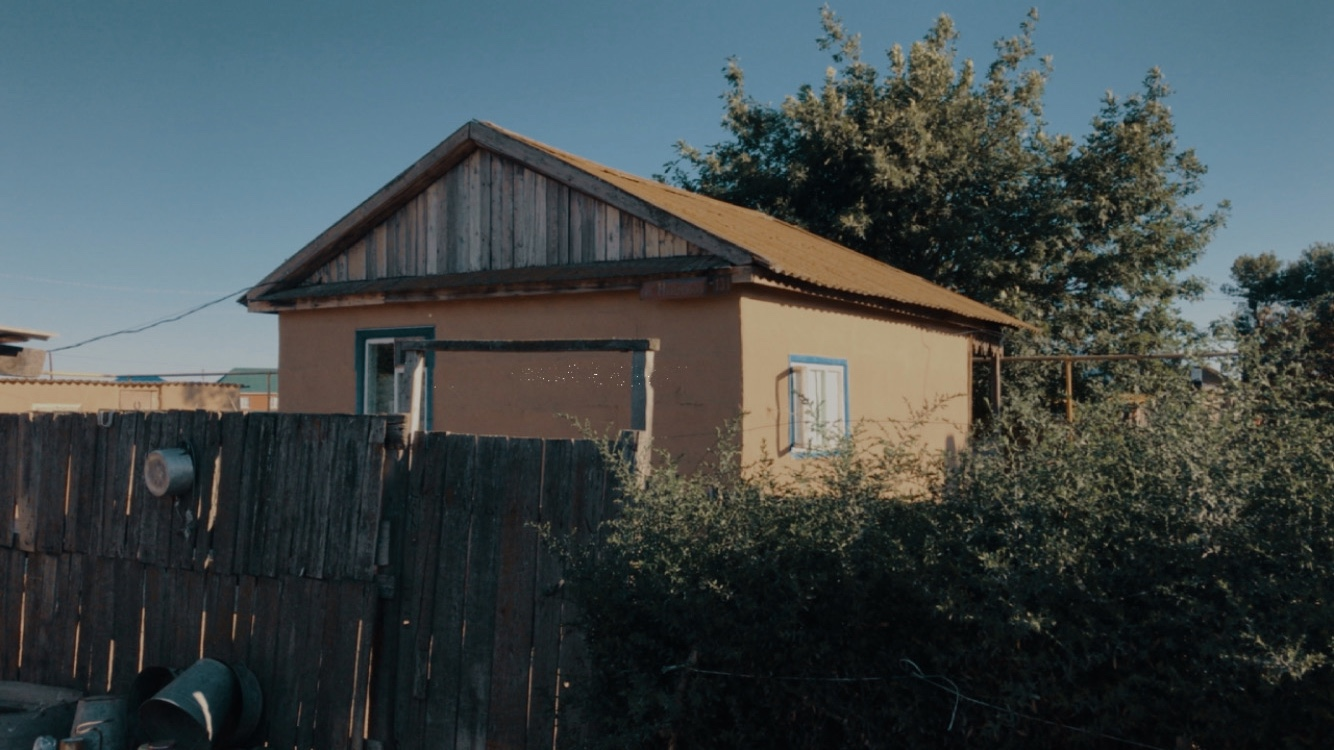

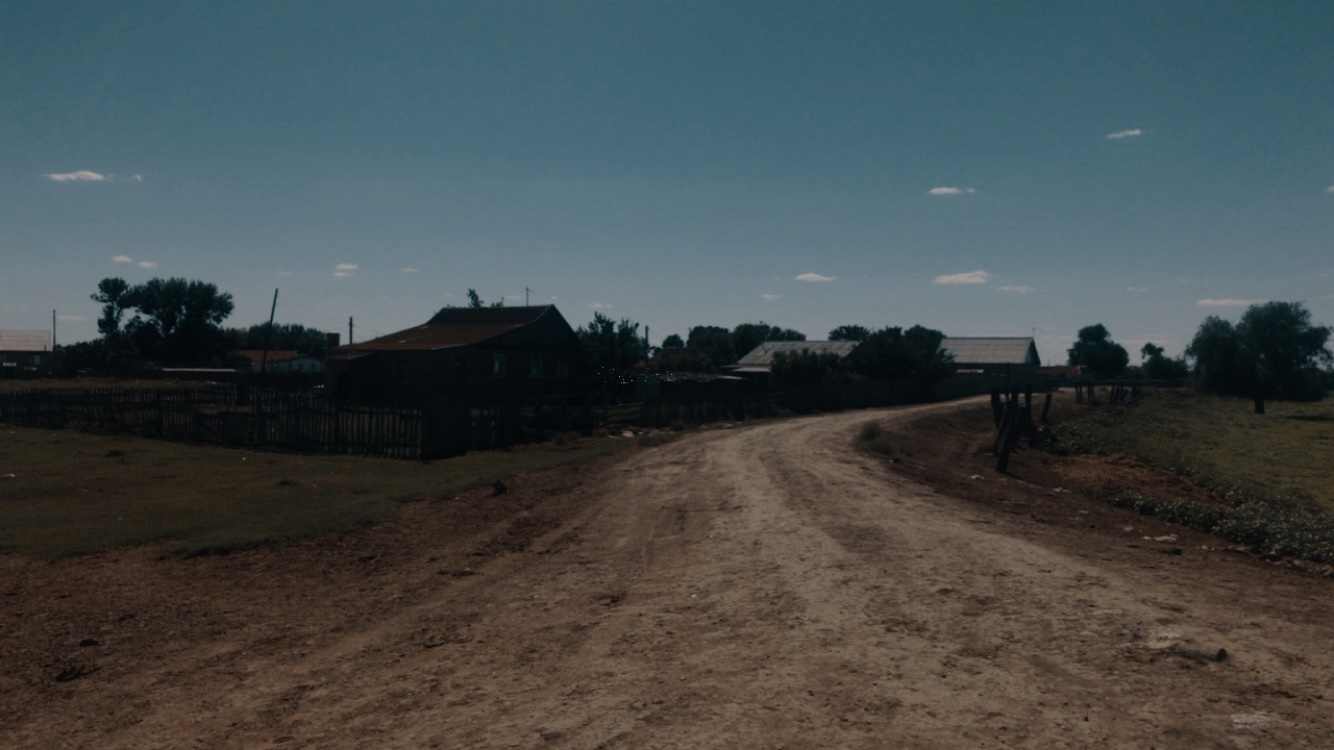

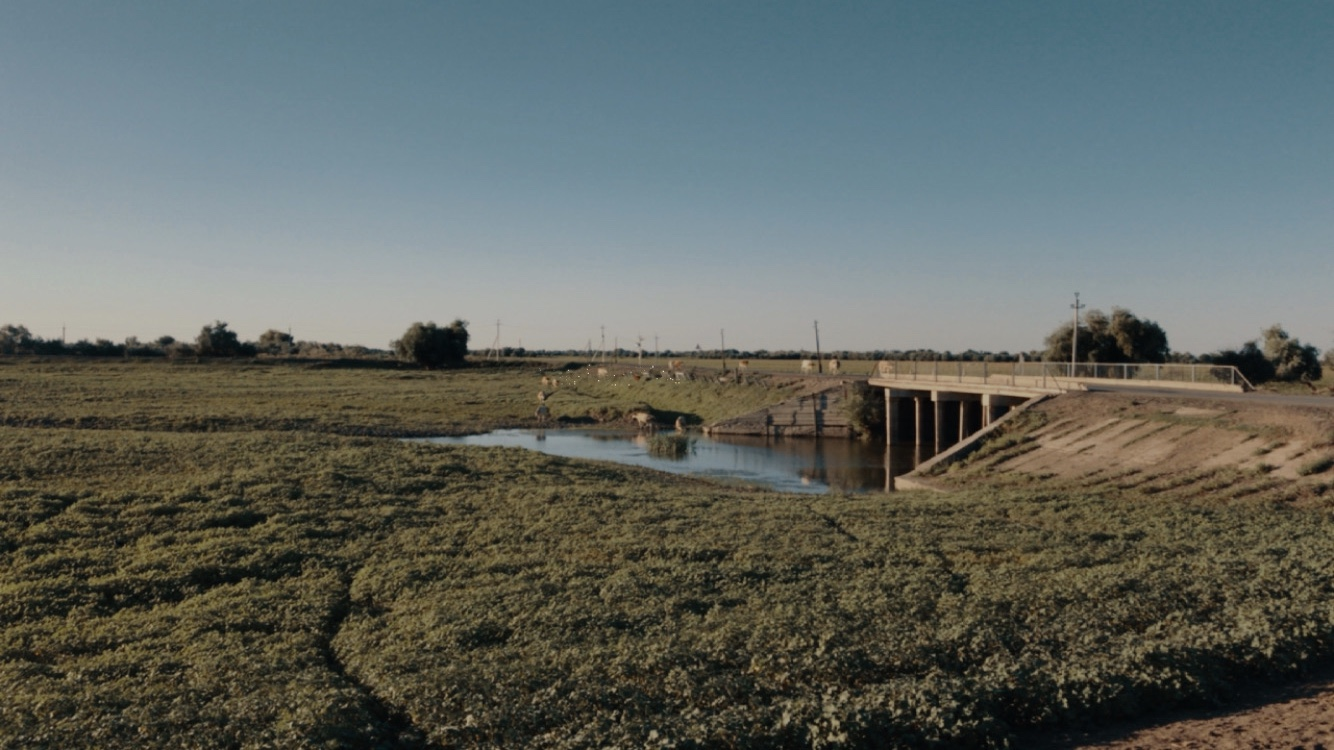
