= Gandurino =

Gandurino Гандурино
- Selo
- Location within Astrakhan Oblast Location within Russia
- Coordinates: 45°51′N 48°00′E
- Country: Russia
- Region: Astrakhan Oblast
- District: Kamyzyaksky District
- Time zone: UTC+4:00

Gandurino (Russian: Гандурино) is a rural locality (a selo) in Obrastsovo-Travinsky Selsoviet, Kamyzyaksky District, Astrakhan Oblast, Russia. The population was 374 as of 2010. There are 5 streets.

== Geography ==
Gandurino is located 39 km south of Kamyzyak (the district's administrative centre) by road. Poldnevnoye is the nearest rural locality.
