= Damchik =

Damchik Дамчик
- Settlement
- Location within Astrakhan Oblast Location within Russia
- Coordinates: 45°47′N 47°53′E
- Country: Russia
- Region: Astrakhan Oblast
- District: Kamyzyaksky District
- Time zone: UTC+4:00

Damchik (Russian: Дамчик) is a rural locality (a settlement) in Obrastsovo-Travinsky Selsoviet, Kamyzyaksky District, Astrakhan Oblast, Russia. The population was 40 as of 2010.

== Geography ==
Damchik is located 50 km south of Kamyzyak (the district's administrative centre) by road. Poldnevnoye is the nearest rural locality.
