= Novokrasnoye =

Novokrasnoye Новокрасное
- Selo
- Location within Astrakhan Oblast Location within Russia
- Coordinates: 46°26′N 48°50′E
- Country: Russia
- Region: Astrakhan Oblast
- District: Volodarsky District
- Time zone: UTC+4:00

Novokrasnoye (Russian: Новокрасное) is a rural locality (a selo) and the administrative center of Novokrasinsky Selsoviet of Volodarsky District, Astrakhan Oblast, Russia. The population was 295 as of 2010. There are 9 streets.

== Geography ==
Novokrasnoye is located 26 km (16 mi) east of Volodarsky (the district's administrative centre) by road. Novomayachnoye and Konny Mogoy are the nearest rural localities.
