= Sizy Bugor =

Sizy Bugor Сизый Бугор
- Selo
- Location within Astrakhan Oblast Location within Russia
- Coordinates: 46°12′N 48°30′E
- Country: Russia
- Region: Astrakhan Oblast
- District: Volodarsky District
- Time zone: UTC+4:00

Sizy Bugor (Russian: Сизый Бугор) is a rural locality (a selo) and the administrative center of Sizobugorsky Selsoviet of Volodarsky District, Astrakhan Oblast, Russia. The population was 1,582 as of 2010. There are 3 streets.

== Geography ==
Sizy Bugor is located on the Bushma River, 26 km (16 mi) south of Volodarsky (the district's administrative centre) by road. Tumak is the nearest rural locality.
