= Bolkhuny =

Bolkhuny Болхуны
- Selo
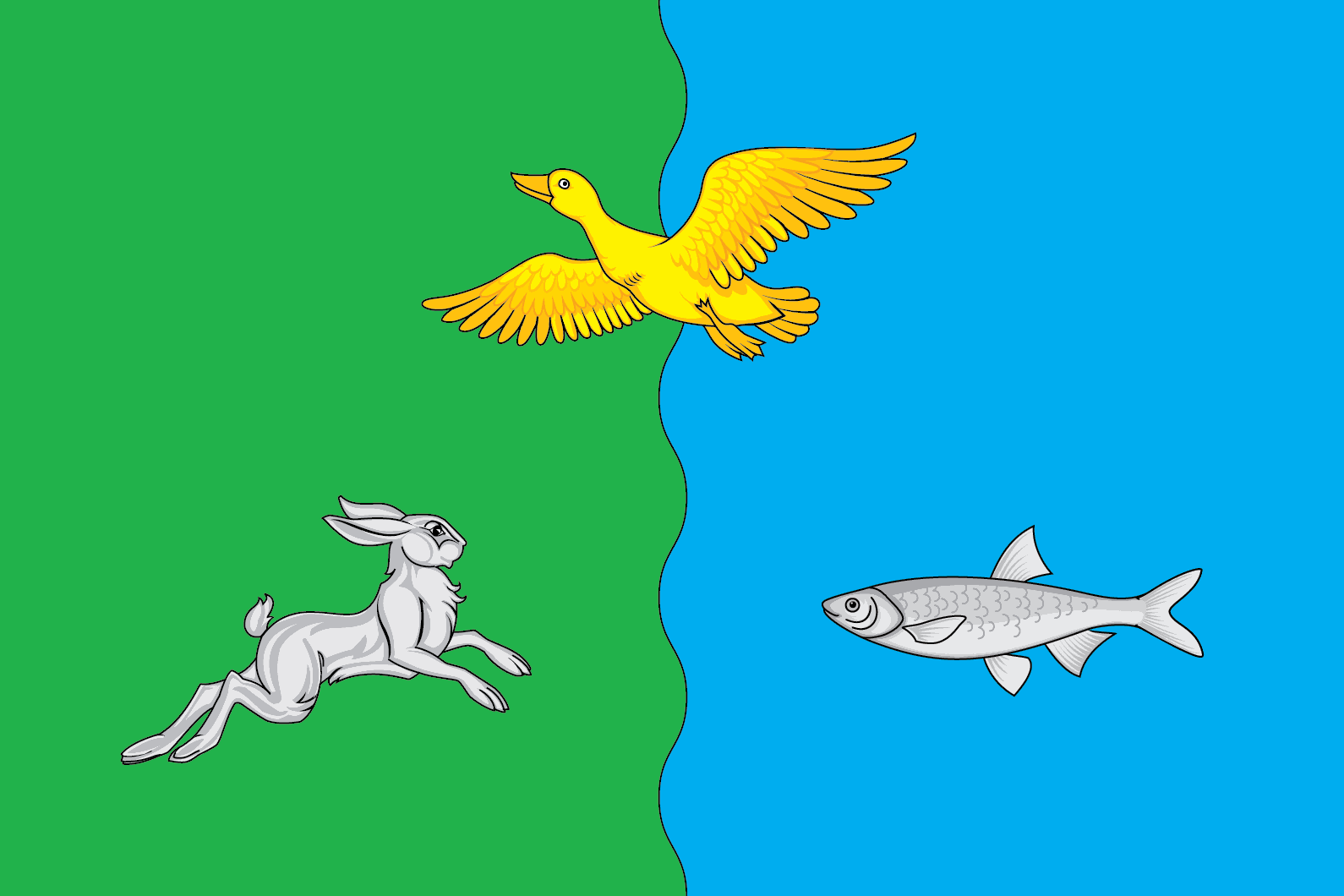
- Flag

- Location within Astrakhan Oblast Location within Russia
- Coordinates: 47°59′N 46°25′E
- Country: Russia
- Region: Astrakhan Oblast
- District: Akhtubinsky District
- Time zone: UTC+4:00

Bolkhuny (Russian: Болхуны) is a rural locality (a selo) in Akhtubinsky District, Astrakhan Oblast, Russia. The population was 2,202 as of 2010. There are 76 streets.

== Geography ==
Bolkhuny is located 44 km (27 mi) southeast of Akhtubinsk (the district's administrative centre) by road. Novo-Nikolayevka is the nearest rural locality.
