= Allaysky =

Allaysky Аллайский
- Settlement
- Location within Astrakhan Oblast Location within Russia
- Coordinates: 46°39′N 48°00′E
- Country: Russia
- Region: Astrakhan Oblast
- District: Krasnoyarsky District
- Time zone: UTC+4:00

Allaysky (Russian: Аллайский) is a rural locality (a settlement) in Buzansky Selsoviet, Krasnoyarsky District, Astrakhan Oblast, Russia. The population was 196 as of 2010.

== Geography ==
Allaysky is located 45 km northwest of Krasny Yar (the district's administrative centre) by road. Delta is the nearest rural locality.
