= Kzyl-Tan =

Kzyl-Tan Кзыл-Тан
- Selo
- Location within Astrakhan Oblast Location within Russia
- Coordinates: 46°22′N 48°32′E
- Country: Russia
- Region: Astrakhan Oblast
- District: Volodarsky District
- Time zone: UTC+4:00

Kzyl-Tan (Russian: Кзыл-Тан) is a rural locality (a selo) in Aktyubinnsky Selsoviet of Volodarsky District, Astrakhan Oblast, Russia. The population was 141 as of 2010. There are 5 streets.

== Geography ==
Kzyl-Tan is located on the Kornevaya River, 3 km (1.9 mi) south of Volodarsky (the district's administrative centre) by road. Volodarsky is the nearest rural locality.
