= Novo-Nikolayevka =

Novo-Nikolayevka Ново-Николаевка
- Selo
- Location within Astrakhan Oblast Location within Russia
- Coordinates: 48°02′N 46°21′E
- Country: Russia
- Region: Astrakhan Oblast
- District: Akhtubinsky District
- Time zone: UTC+4:00

Novo-Nikolayevka (Russian: Ново-Николаевка) is a rural locality (a selo) in Akhtubinsky District, Astrakhan Oblast, Russia. The population was 1,118 as of 2010. There are 15 streets.

== Geography ==
Novo-Nikolayevka is located 35 km (22 mi) south of Akhtubinsk (the district's administrative centre) by road. Bolkhuny is the nearest rural locality.
