= Biryuchek =

Biryuchek Бирючек
- Selo
- Location within Astrakhan Oblast Location within Russia
- Coordinates: 46°07′N 48°13′E
- Country: Russia
- Region: Astrakhan Oblast
- District: Kamyzyaksky District
- Time zone: UTC+4:00

Biryuchek (Russian: Бирючек) is a rural locality (a selo) in Semibugrinsky Selsoviet, Kamyzyaksky District, Astrakhan Oblast, Russia. The population was 552 as of 2010. There are 5 streets.

== Geography ==
Biryuchek is located on the Chyornaya River, 23 km east of Kamyzyak (the district's administrative centre) by road. Razdor is the nearest rural locality.
