= Nizhnekalinovsky =

Nizhnekalinovsky Нижнекалиновский
- Settlement
- Location within Astrakhan Oblast Location within Russia
- Coordinates: 45°58′N 48°10′E
- Country: Russia
- Region: Astrakhan Oblast
- District: Kamyzyaksky District
- Time zone: UTC+4:00

Nizhnekalinovsky (Russian: Нижнекалиновский) is a rural locality (a settlement) in Zhan-Aulsky Selsoviet, Kamyzyaksky District, Astrakhan Oblast, Russia. The population was 161 as of 2010.
