= Bakharevsky =

Bakharevsky Бахаревский
- Settlement
- Location within Astrakhan Oblast Location within Russia
- Coordinates: 46°48′N 47°57′E
- Country: Russia
- Region: Astrakhan Oblast
- District: Krasnoyarsky District
- Time zone: UTC+4:00

Bakharevsky (Russian: Бахаревский) is a rural locality (a settlement) in Akhtubinsky Selsoviet, Krasnoyarsky District, Astrakhan Oblast, Russia. The population was 266 as of 2010. There are 2 streets.

== Geography ==
Bakharevsky is located 63 km northwest of Krasny Yar (the district's administrative centre) by road. Vishnyovy is the nearest rural locality.
