= Dzhamba =

Dzhamba Джамба
- Selo
- Location within Astrakhan Oblast Location within Russia
- Coordinates: 46°06′N 47°39′E
- Country: Russia
- Region: Astrakhan Oblast
- District: Ikryaninsky District
- Time zone: UTC+4:00

Dzhamba (Russian: Джамба) is a rural locality (a selo) in Vostochny Selsoviet, Ikryaninsky District, Astrakhan Oblast, Russia. The population was 119 as of 2010. There are 2 streets.

== Geography ==
Dzhamba is located 14 km northwest of Ikryanoye (the district's administrative centre) by road. Vostochnoye is the nearest rural locality.
