= Trekhizbinka =

Trekhizbinka Трехизбинка
- Selo
- Location within Astrakhan Oblast Location within Russia
- Coordinates: 46°09′N 48°21′E
- Country: Russia
- Region: Astrakhan Oblast
- District: Kamyzyaksky District
- Time zone: UTC+4:00

Trekhizbinka (Russian: Трехизбинка) is a rural locality (a selo) in Novotuzukleysky Selsoviet, Kamyzyaksky District, Astrakhan Oblast, Russia. The population was 199 as of 2010. There is 1 street.

== Geography ==
Trekhizbinka is located 40 km east of Kamyzyak (the district's administrative centre) by road. Tuzukley is the nearest rural locality.
