= Korovye =

Korovye Коровье
- Selo
- Location within Astrakhan Oblast Location within Russia
- Coordinates: 46°18′N 48°34′E
- Country: Russia
- Region: Astrakhan Oblast
- District: Volodarsky District
- Time zone: UTC+4:00

Korovye (Russian: Коровье) is a rural locality (a selo) in Altynzharsky Selsoviet of Volodarsky District, Astrakhan Oblast, Russia. The population was 157 as of 2010. There is 1 street.

== Geography ==
Korovye is located on the Kornevaya River, 15 km (9.3 mi) south of Volodarsky (the district's administrative centre) by road. Kara-Biryuk is the nearest rural locality.
