= Vatazhka =

Vatazhka Ватажка
- Selo
- Location within Astrakhan Oblast Location within Russia
- Coordinates: 46°25′N 48°43′E
- Country: Russia
- Region: Astrakhan Oblast
- District: Volodarsky District
- Time zone: UTC+4:00

Vatazhka (Russian: Ватажка) is a rural locality (a selo) in Marfinsky Selsoviet of Volodarsky District, Astrakhan Oblast, Russia. The population was 172 as of 2010. There are 4 streets.

== Geography ==
Vatazhka is located 19 km (12 mi) east of Volodarsky (the district's administrative centre) by road. Marfino is the nearest rural locality.
