= Kononenko, Astrakhan Oblast =

Kononenko Кононенко
- Khutor
- Location within Astrakhan Oblast Location within Russia
- Coordinates: 48°09′N 46°13′E
- Country: Russia
- Region: Astrakhan Oblast
- District: Akhtubinsky District
- Time zone: UTC+4:00

Kononenko (Russian: Кононенко) is a rural locality (a khutor) in Uspensky Selsoviet of Akhtubinsky District, Astrakhan Oblast, Russia. The population was 8 as of 2010.

== Geography ==
Kononenko is located 23 km southeast of Akhtubinsk (the district's administrative centre) by road.
