= Krutoye =

Krutoye Крутое
- Selo
- Location within Astrakhan Oblast Location within Russia
- Coordinates: 46°15′N 48°38′E
- Country: Russia
- Region: Astrakhan Oblast
- District: Volodarsky District
- Time zone: UTC+4:00

Krutoye (Russian: Крутое) is a rural locality (a selo) and the administrative center of Krutovsky Selsoviet of Volodarsky District, Astrakhan Oblast, Russia. The population was 754 as of 2010. There are 9 streets.

== Geography ==
Krutoye is located 25 km (16 mi) southeast of Volodarsky (the district's administrative centre) by road. Korni is the nearest rural locality.
