= Mikhaylovka, Kharabalinsky District, Astrakhan Oblast =

Mikhaylovka Михайловка
- Selo
- Interactive map of Mikhaylovka
- Location within Astrakhan Oblast Location within Russia
- Coordinates: 47°38′47″N 46°52′11″E
- Country: Russia
- Region: Astrakhan Oblast
- District: Kharabalinsky District
- Time zone: UTC+4:00

Mikhaylovka (Russian: Михайловка) is a rural locality (a selo) and the administrative center of Mikhaylovsky Selsoviet, Kharabalinsky District, Astrakhan Oblast, Russia. The population was 1,189 as of 2010. There are 14 streets.

== Geography ==
It is located on the Akhtuba River, 42 km north-west from Kharabali.
