= Aysapay =

Aysapay Айсапай
- Settlement
- Interactive map of Aysapay
- Location within Astrakhan Oblast Location within Russia
- Coordinates: 46°45′N 47°59′E
- Country: Russia
- Region: Astrakhan Oblast
- District: Krasnoyarsky District
- Time zone: UTC+4:00

Aysapay (Russian: Айсапай) is a rural locality (a settlement) in Seitovsky Selsoviet, Krasnoyarsky District, Astrakhan Oblast, Russia. The population was 37 as of 2010. There are 3 streets.

== Geography ==
Aysapay is located 45 km northwest of Krasny Yar (the district's administrative centre) by road. Kuyanly is the nearest rural locality.
