= Krasa, Astrakhan Oblast =

Krasa Краса
- Selo
- Location within Astrakhan Oblast Location within Russia
- Coordinates: 45°47′N 47°42′E
- Country: Russia
- Region: Astrakhan Oblast
- District: Ikryaninsky District
- Time zone: UTC+4:00

Krasa (Russian: Краса) is a rural locality (a selo) in Zhitninsky Selsoviet, Ikryaninsky District, Astrakhan Oblast, Russia. The population was 105 as of 2010. There is one street.

== Geography ==
Krasa is located 45 km south of Ikryanoye (the district's administrative centre) by road. Zhitnoye is the nearest rural locality.
