= Bolshoy Mogoy =

Bolshoy Mogoy Большой Могой
- Selo
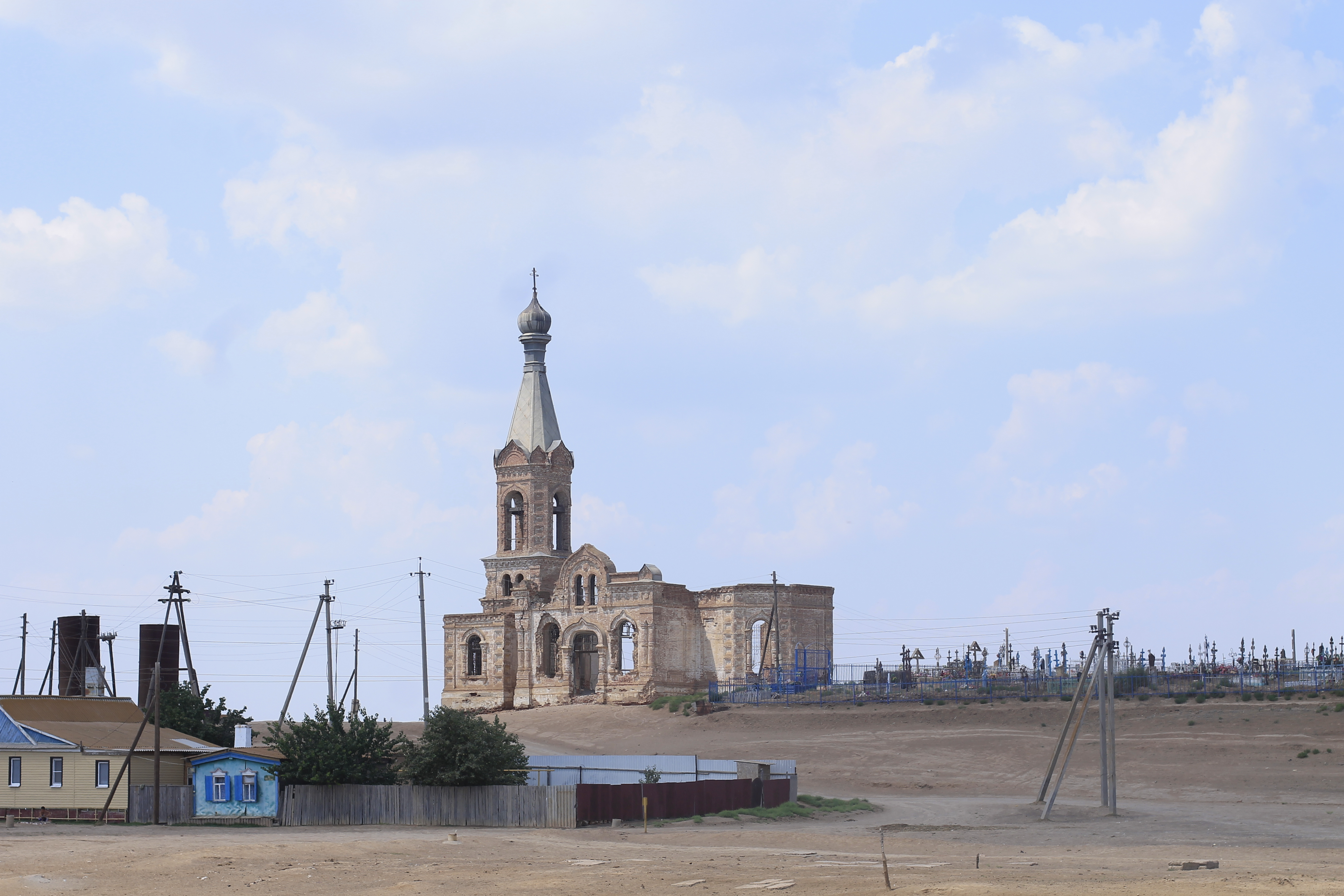

- Location within Astrakhan Oblast Location within Russia
- Coordinates: 46°18′N 48°39′E
- Country: Russia
- Region: Astrakhan Oblast
- District: Volodarsky District
- Time zone: UTC+4:00

Bolshoy Mogoy (Russian: Большой Могой) is a rural locality (a selo) and the administrative center of Bolshemogoysky Selsoviet of Volodarsky District, Astrakhan Oblast, Russia. The population was 1,048 as of 2010. There are 10 streets.

== Geography ==
Bolshoy Mogoy is located on the Sarbay River, 19 km (12 mi) southeast of Volodarsky (the district's administrative centre) by road. Maly Mogoy is the nearest rural locality.
