= Novy Kutum =

Novy Kutum Новый Кутум
- Settlement
- Location within Astrakhan Oblast Location within Russia
- Coordinates: 46°19′N 48°08′E
- Country: Russia
- Region: Astrakhan Oblast
- District: Privolzhsky District
- Time zone: UTC+4:00

Novy Kutum (Russian: Новый Кутум) is a rural locality (a settlement) in Tryokhprotoksky Selsoviet, Privolzhsky District, Astrakhan Oblast, Russia. The population was 134 as of 2010. There are 11 streets.

== Geography ==
Novy Kutum is located 6 km west of Nachalovo (the district's administrative centre) by road. Tri Potoka is the nearest rural locality.
