= Zhan-Aul =

Zhan-Aul Жан-Аул
- Settlement
- Location within Astrakhan Oblast Location within Russia
- Coordinates: 45°58′N 48°07′E
- Country: Russia
- Region: Astrakhan Oblast
- District: Kamyzyaksky District
- Time zone: UTC+4:00

Zhan-Aul (Russian: Жан-Аул; Kazakh: Жаңаауыл, Jañaauyl) is a rural locality (a settlement) and the administrative center of Zhan-Aulsky Selsoviet, Kamyzyaksky District, Astrakhan Oblast, Russia. The population was 875 as of 2010. There are 8 streets.

== Geography ==
Zhan-Aul is located 20 km south of Kamyzyak (the district's administrative centre) by road. Verkhnekalinovsky is the nearest rural locality.
