= Goszapovednika =

Goszapovednika Госзаповедника
- Settlement
- Location within Astrakhan Oblast Location within Russia
- Coordinates: 46°18′N 48°58′E
- Country: Russia
- Region: Astrakhan Oblast
- District: Volodarsky District
- Time zone: UTC+4:00

Goszapovednika (Russian: Госзаповедника) is a rural locality (a settlement) in Kalininsky Selsoviet of Volodarsky District, Astrakhan Oblast, Russia. The population was 7 as of 2010.
