= Novonachalovsky =

Novonachalovsky Новоначаловский
- Settlement
- Location within Astrakhan Oblast Location within Russia
- Coordinates: 46°20′N 48°08′E
- Country: Russia
- Region: Astrakhan Oblast
- District: Privolzhsky District
- Time zone: UTC+4:00

Novonachalovsky (Russian: Новоначаловский) is a rural locality (a settlement) in Nachalovsky Selsoviet, Privolzhsky District, Astrakhan Oblast, Russia. The population was 808 as of 2010. There are 36 streets.

== Geography ==
Novonachalovsky is located 5 km west of Nachalovo (the district's administrative centre) by road. Tri Potoka is the nearest rural locality.
