= Gromov, Astrakhan Oblast =

Gromov Громов
- Khutor
- Location within Astrakhan Oblast Location within Russia
- Coordinates: 48°21′N 45°54′E
- Country: Russia
- Region: Astrakhan Oblast
- District: Akhtubinsky District
- Time zone: UTC+4:00

Gromov (Russian: Громов) is a rural locality (a khutor) in Pologozaymishchensky Selsoviet of Akhtubinsky District, Astrakhan Oblast, Russia. The population was 23 as of 2010. There is 1 street.

== Geography ==
Gromov is located 47 km (29 mi) northwest of Akhtubinsk (the district's administrative centre) by road. Klochkov is the nearest rural locality.
