= Maly Mogoy =

Maly Mogoy Малый Могой
- Selo
- Location within Astrakhan Oblast Location within Russia
- Coordinates: 46°19′N 48°38′E
- Country: Russia
- Region: Astrakhan Oblast
- District: Volodarsky District
- Time zone: UTC+4:00

Maly Mogoy (Russian: Малый Могой) is a rural locality (a selo) in Bolshemogoysky Selsoviet of Volodarsky District, Astrakhan Oblast, Russia. The population was 95 as of 2010. There are 2 streets.

== Geography ==
Maly Mogoy is located on the Sarbay River, 21 km (13 mi) southeast of Volodarsky (the district's administrative centre) by road. Bolshoy Mogoy is the nearest rural locality.
