= Multanovo =

Multanovo Мултаново
- Selo
- Location within Astrakhan Oblast Location within Russia
- Coordinates: 46°19′N 48°46′E
- Country: Russia
- Region: Astrakhan Oblast
- District: Volodarsky District
- Time zone: UTC+4:00

Multanovo (Russian: Мултаново) is a rural locality (a selo) and the administrative center of Multanovsky Selsoviet of Volodarsky District, Astrakhan Oblast, Russia. The population was 1,170 as of 2010. There are 21 streets.

== Geography ==
Multanovo is located 24 km (15 mi) southeast of Volodarsky (the district's administrative centre) by road. Sarmantayevka is the nearest rural locality.
