= Biryukovka =

Biryukovka Бирюковка
- Selo
- Location within Astrakhan Oblast Location within Russia
- Coordinates: 46°19′N 48°18′E
- Country: Russia
- Region: Astrakhan Oblast
- District: Privolzhsky District
- Time zone: UTC+4:00

Biryukovka (Russian: Бирюковка) is a rural locality (a selo) and the administrative center of Biryukovsky Selsoviet, Privolzhsky District, Astrakhan Oblast, Russia. The population was 1,857 as of 2010. There are 16 streets.

== Geography ==
Biryukovka is located 12 km southeast of Nachalovo (the district's administrative centre) by road. Kulpa is the nearest rural locality.
