= Barkhany =

Barkhany Барханы
- Settlement
- Location within Astrakhan Oblast Location within Russia
- Coordinates: 46°18′N 46°51′E
- Country: Russia
- Region: Astrakhan Oblast
- District: Narimanovsky District
- Time zone: UTC+4:00

Barkhany (Russian: Барханы) is a rural locality (a settlement) in Prikaspiysky Selsoviet, Narimanovsky District, Astrakhan Oblast, Russia. The population was 150 as of 2010. There is one street.

== Geography ==
Barkhany is located on the Volga River, 133 km southwest of Narimanov (the district's administrative centre) by road. Solyony is the nearest rural locality.
