= Zaburunnoye =

Zaburunnoye Забурунное
- Selo
- Location within Astrakhan Oblast Location within Russia
- Coordinates: 45°43′N 47°32′E
- Country: Russia
- Region: Astrakhan Oblast
- District: Limansky District
- Time zone: UTC+4:00

Zaburunnoye (Russian: Забурунное) is a rural locality (a selo) in Biryuchekosinsky Selsoviet, Limansky District, Astrakhan Oblast, Russia. The population was 109 as of 2010. There are 4 streets.

== Geography ==
Zaburunnoye is located 32 km southeast of Liman (the district's administrative centre) by road. Biryuchya Kosa is the nearest rural locality.
