= Sazany Ugol =

Sazany Ugol Сазаний Угол
- Khutor
- Interactive map of Sazany Ugol
- Location within Astrakhan Oblast Location within Russia
- Coordinates: 47°25′N 47°05′E
- Country: Russia
- Region: Astrakhan Oblast
- District: Kharabalinsky District
- Time zone: UTC+4:00

Sazany Ugol (Russian: Сазаний Угол) is a rural locality (a khutor) in Kochkovatsky Selsoviet, Kharabalinsky District, Astrakhan Oblast, Russia. The population was 13 as of 2010. There are 2 streets.

== Geography ==
Sazany Ugol is located 17 km west of Kharabali (the district's administrative centre) by road. Kharabali is the nearest rural locality.
