= Vatazhnoye =

Vatazhnoye Ватажное
- Selo
- Location within Astrakhan Oblast Location within Russia
- Coordinates: 46°33′N 48°23′E
- Country: Russia
- Region: Astrakhan Oblast
- District: Krasnoyarsky District
- Time zone: UTC+4:00

Vatazhnoye (Russian: Ватажное) is a rural locality (a selo) and the administrative center of Vatazhensky Selsoviet, Krasnoyarsky District, Astrakhan Oblast, Russia. The population was 1,242 as of 2010. There are 24 streets.

== Geography ==
Vatazhnoye is located 6 km northeast of Krasny Yar (the district's administrative centre) by road. Kondakovka is the nearest rural locality.
