= Novogeorgiyevsk, Astrakhan Oblast =

Novogeorgiyevsk Новогеоргиевск
- Selo
- Location within Astrakhan Oblast Location within Russia
- Coordinates: 45°52′N 47°27′E
- Country: Russia
- Region: Astrakhan Oblast
- District: Limansky District
- Time zone: UTC+4:00

Novogeorgiyevsk (Russian: Новогеоргиевск) is a rural locality (a selo) in Novogeorgiyevsky Selsoviet, Limansky District, Astrakhan Oblast, Russia. The population was 530 as of 2010.

== Geography ==
Novogeorgiyevsk is located 23 km northeast of Liman (the district's administrative centre) by road. Zarechnoye is the nearest rural locality.
