= Posyolok Gospitomnika =

Posyolok Gospitomnika Посёлок Госпитомника
- Settlement
- Location within Astrakhan Oblast Location within Russia
- Coordinates: 47°15′N 47°02′E
- Country: Russia
- Region: Astrakhan Oblast
- District: Yenotayevsky District
- Time zone: UTC+4:00

Posyolok Gospitomnika (Russian: Посёлок Госпитомника) is a rural locality (a settlement) in Selo Yenotayevka of Yenotayevsky District, Astrakhan Oblast, Russia. The population was 20 as of 2010.
