= Tri Protoka =

Tri Protoka Три Протока
- Selo
- Location within Astrakhan Oblast Location within Russia
- Coordinates: 46°19′N 48°07′E
- Country: Russia
- Region: Astrakhan Oblast
- District: Privolzhsky District
- Time zone: UTC+4:00

Tri Protoka (Russian: Три Протока) is a rural locality (a selo) and the administrative center of Tryokhprotoksky Selsoviet, Privolzhsky District, Astrakhan Oblast, Russia. The population was 2,569 as of 2010. There are 113 streets.

== Geography ==
Tri Protoka is located 9 km west of Nachalovo (the district's administrative centre) by road. Polyana is the nearest rural locality.
