= Ushakovka =

Ushakovka Ушаковка
- Selo
- Location within Astrakhan Oblast Location within Russia
- Coordinates: 48°25′N 45°06′E
- Country: Russia
- Region: Astrakhan Oblast
- District: Chernoyarsky District
- Time zone: UTC+4:00

Ushakovka (Russian: Ушаковка) is a rural locality (a selo) in Chernoyarsky District, Astrakhan Oblast, Russia. The population was 1,565 as of 2010. There are 19 streets.

== Geography ==
Ushakovka is located 93 km northwest of Chyorny Yar (the district's administrative centre) by road. Solodniki is the nearest rural locality.
