= Akhtubinka =

Akhtubinka Ахтубинка
- Selo
- Interactive map of Akhtubinka
- Location within Astrakhan Oblast Location within Russia
- Coordinates: 47°04′N 47°46′E
- Country: Russia
- Region: Astrakhan Oblast
- District: Kharabalinsky District
- Time zone: UTC+4:00

Akhtubinka (Russian: Ахтубинка) is a rural locality (a selo) in Khosheutovsky Selsoviet, Kharabalinsky District, Astrakhan Oblast, Russia. The population was 417 as of 2010. There are 5 streets.

== Geography ==
Akhtubinka is located on the Ashuluk River, 67 km southeast of Kharabali (the district's administrative centre) by road. Khosheutovo is the nearest rural locality.
