= Novostroy =

Novostroy Новострой
- Settlement
- Location within Astrakhan Oblast Location within Russia
- Coordinates: 46°53′N 47°35′E
- Country: Russia
- Region: Astrakhan Oblast
- District: Yenotayevsky District
- Time zone: UTC+4:00

Novostroy (Russian: Новострой) is a rural locality (a settlement) in Zamyansky Selsoviet of Yenotayevsky District, Astrakhan Oblast, Russia. The population was 406 as of 2010. There are 8 streets.

== Geography ==
Novostroy is located 240 km southeast of Yenotayevka (the district's administrative centre) by road. Pribrezhny is the nearest rural locality.
