= Vakhromeyevo =

Vakhromeyevo Вахромеево
- Selo
- Location within Astrakhan Oblast Location within Russia
- Coordinates: 45°49′N 47°34′E
- Country: Russia
- Region: Astrakhan Oblast
- District: Ikryaninsky District
- Time zone: UTC+4:00

Vakhromeyevo (Russian: Вахромеево) is a rural locality (a selo) in Mayachninsky Selsoviet of Ikryaninsky District, Astrakhan Oblast, Russia. The population was 150 as of 2010. There are 5 streets.

== Geography ==
Vakhromeyevo is located 45 km south of Ikryanoye (the district's administrative centre) by road. Khmelevoy is the nearest rural locality.
