= Talnikovy, Astrakhan Oblast =

Talnikovy Тальниковый
- Settlement
- Location within Astrakhan Oblast Location within Russia
- Coordinates: 46°38′N 48°03′E
- Country: Russia
- Region: Astrakhan Oblast
- District: Krasnoyarsky District
- Time zone: UTC+4:00

Talnikovy (Russian: Тальниковый) is a rural locality (a settlement) in Buzansky Selsoviet, Krasnoyarsky District, Astrakhan Oblast, Russia. The population was 443 as of 2010.

== Geography ==
Talnikovy is 42 km northwest of Krasny Yar (the district's administrative centre) by road. Delta is the nearest rural locality.
