= Pervomaysky, Astrakhan Oblast =

Pervomaysky Первомайский
- Settlement
- Location within Astrakhan Oblast Location within Russia
- Coordinates: 46°34′N 48°19′E
- Country: Russia
- Region: Astrakhan Oblast
- District: Krasnoyarsky District
- Time zone: UTC+4:00

Pervomaysky (Russian: Первомайский) is a rural locality (a settlement) in Krasnoyarsky Selsoviet, Krasnoyarsky District, Astrakhan Oblast, Russia. The population was 31 as of 2010. There are 4 streets.

== Geography ==
It is located 3 km north from Krasny Yar.
