= Kosika, Astrakhan Oblast =

Ivanovka Косика
- Selo
- Location within Astrakhan Oblast Location within Russia
- Coordinates: 47°05′N 47°12′E
- Country: Russia
- Region: Astrakhan Oblast
- District: Yenotayevsky District
- Time zone: UTC+4:00

Ivanovka (Russian: Косика) is a rural locality (a selo) and the administrative center of Kosikinsky Selsoviet of Yenotayevsky District, Astrakhan Oblast, Russia. The population was 563 as of 2010. There are 10 streets.

== Geography ==
Kosika is located 29 km southeast of Yenotayevka (the district's administrative centre) by road. Vostok is the nearest rural locality.
