= Belyachy =

Belyachy Белячий
- Settlement
- Location within Astrakhan Oblast Location within Russia
- Coordinates: 46°42′N 48°03′E
- Country: Russia
- Region: Astrakhan Oblast
- District: Krasnoyarsky District
- Time zone: UTC+4:00

Belyachy (Russian: Белячий) is a rural locality (a settlement) in Seitovsky Selsoviet, Krasnoyarsky District, Astrakhan Oblast, Russia. The population was 378 as of 2010. There are 11 streets.

== Geography ==
Belyachy is located 38 km northwest of Krasny Yar (the district's administrative centre) by road. Buzan-Pristan is the nearest rural locality.
