= Fyodorovka, Ikryaninsky District, Astrakhan Oblast =

Fyodorovka Фёдоровка
- Selo
- Location within Astrakhan Oblast Location within Russia
- Coordinates: 45°51′N 47°38′E
- Country: Russia
- Region: Astrakhan Oblast
- District: Ikryaninsky District
- Time zone: UTC+4:00

Fyodorovka (Russian: Фёдоровка) is a rural locality (a selo) in Ikryaninsky District, Astrakhan Oblast, Russia. The population was 682 as of 2010. There are twelve streets.

== Geography ==
Fyodorovka is 34 kilometres (21 mi) south of Ikryanoye (the district's administrative centre) by road. Ninovka is the nearest rural locality.
