= Nizhnyaya Sultanovka =

Nizhnyaya Sultanovka Нижняя Султановка
- Selo
- Location within Astrakhan Oblast Location within Russia
- Coordinates: 46°16′N 48°27′E
- Country: Russia
- Region: Astrakhan Oblast
- District: Volodarsky District
- Time zone: UTC+4:00

Nizhnyaya Sultanovka (Russian: Нижняя Султановка) is a rural locality (a selo) in Sultanovsky Selsoviet of Volodarsky District, Astrakhan Oblast, Russia. The population was 452 as of 2010. There are 2 streets.

== Geography ==
Nizhnyaya Sultanovka is located 38 km (24 mi) southwest of Volodarsky (the district's administrative centre) by road. Sakhma is the nearest rural locality.
