= Funtovo-1 =

Funtovo-1 Фунтово-1
- Selo
- Location within Astrakhan Oblast Location within Russia
- Coordinates: 46°14′N 48°05′E
- Country: Russia
- Region: Astrakhan Oblast
- District: Privolzhsky District
- Time zone: UTC+4:00

Funtovo-1 (Russian: Фунтово-1) is a rural locality (a selo) and the administrative center of Funtovsky Selsoviet, Privolzhsky District, Astrakhan Oblast, Russia. The population was 1,064 as of 2010. There are 55 streets.

== Geography ==
Funtovo-1 is located 21 km southwest of Nachalovo (the district's administrative centre) by road. Kirpichnogo zavoda #1 is the nearest rural locality.
