= Dedushkin =

Dedushkin Дедушкин
- Settlement
- Interactive map of Dedushkin
- Location within Astrakhan Oblast Location within Russia
- Coordinates: 47°22′N 47°03′E
- Country: Russia
- Region: Astrakhan Oblast
- District: Kharabalinsky District
- Time zone: UTC+4:00

Dedushkin (Russian: Дедушкин) is a rural locality (a selo) in Kharabali, Kharabalinsky District, Astrakhan Oblast, Russia. The population was 23 as of 2010.

== Geography ==
Dedushkin is located on the Volga River, 20 km west of Kharabali (the district's administrative centre) by road. Yekaterinovka is the nearest rural locality.
