= Dubovy =

Dubovy Дубовый
- Khutor
- Location within Astrakhan Oblast Location within Russia
- Coordinates: 48°26′N 45°51′E
- Country: Russia
- Region: Astrakhan Oblast
- District: Akhtubinsky District
- Time zone: UTC+4:00

Dubovy (Russian: Дубовый) is a rural locality (a khutor) in Pologozaymishchensky Selsoviet of Akhtubinsky District, Astrakhan Oblast, Russia. The population was 11 as of 2010. There is 1 street.

== Geography ==
Dubovy is located 38 km (24 mi) northwest of Akhtubinsk (the district's administrative centre) by road. Rogozin is the nearest rural locality.
