= Sudachye =

Sudachye Судачье
- Selo
- Location within Astrakhan Oblast Location within Russia
- Coordinates: 45°51′N 47°33′E
- Country: Russia
- Region: Astrakhan Oblast
- District: Limansky District
- Time zone: UTC+4:00

Sudachye (Russian: Судачье) is a rural locality (a selo) in Kryazhevinsky Selsoviet, Limansky District, Astrakhan Oblast, Russia. The population was 284 as of 2010. There are 4 streets.

== Geography ==
Sudachye is located 34 km northeast of Liman (the district's administrative centre) by road. Oranzherei is the nearest rural locality.
