= Seroglazka =

Seroglazka Сероглазка
- Selo
- Location within Astrakhan Oblast Location within Russia
- Coordinates: 47°00′N 47°28′E
- Country: Russia
- Region: Astrakhan Oblast
- District: Yenotayevsky District
- Time zone: UTC+4:00

Seroglazka (Russian: Сероглазка) is a rural locality (a selo) in Srednevolzhsky Selsoviet of Yenotayevsky District, Astrakhan Oblast, Russia. The population was 409 as of 2010. There are 7 streets.

== Geography ==
Seroglazka is located 56 km southeast of Yenotayevka (the district's administrative centre) by road. Promyslovy is the nearest rural locality.
