= Protochnoye =

Protochnoye Проточное
- Selo
- Location within Astrakhan Oblast Location within Russia
- Coordinates: 45°53′N 47°17′E
- Country: Russia
- Region: Astrakhan Oblast
- District: Limansky District
- Time zone: UTC+4:00

Protochnoye (Russian: Проточное) is a rural locality (a selo) and the administrative center of Protochensky Selsoviet, Limansky District, Astrakhan Oblast, Russia. The population was 610 as of 2010. There are 3 streets.

== Geography ==
Protochnoye is located 33 km northeast of Liman (the district's administrative centre) by road. Zarechnoye is the nearest rural locality.
