= Bakhtemir =

Bakhtemir Бахтемир
- Selo
- Location within Astrakhan Oblast Location within Russia
- Coordinates: 46°09′N 47°48′E
- Country: Russia
- Region: Astrakhan Oblast
- District: Ikryaninsky District
- Time zone: UTC+4:00

Bakhtemir (Russian: Бахтемир) is a rural locality (a selo) and the administrative center of Bakhtemirsky Selsoviet of Ikryaninsky District, Astrakhan Oblast, Russia. The population was 2,532 as of 2010. There are 38 streets.

== Geography ==
Bakhtemir is located 12 km northeast of Ikryanoye (the district's administrative centre) by road. Novo-Bulgary is the nearest rural locality.
