= Tatarskaya Bashmakovka =

Tatarskaya Bashmakovka Татарская Башмаковка
- Selo
- Location within Astrakhan Oblast Location within Russia
- Coordinates: 46°15′N 47°58′E
- Country: Russia
- Region: Astrakhan Oblast
- District: Privolzhsky District
- Time zone: UTC+4:00

Tatarskaya Bashmakovka (Russian: Татарская Башмаковка, Tatar: Qızan) is a rural locality (a selo) and the administrative center of Tatarobashmakovsky Selsoviet, Privolzhsky District, Astrakhan Oblast, Russia. The population was 2,497 as of 2010. There are 64 streets.

== Geography ==
Tatarskaya Bashmakovka is located 31 km southwest of Nachalovo (the district's administrative centre) by road. Steklozavoda is the nearest rural locality.
