= Talovinka =

Talovinka Таловинка
- Settlement
- Location within Astrakhan Oblast Location within Russia
- Coordinates: 46°22′N 48°32′E
- Country: Russia
- Region: Astrakhan Oblast
- District: Volodarsky District
- Time zone: UTC+4:00

Talovinka (Russian: Таловинка) is a rural locality (a settlement) in Aktyubinsky Selsoviet of Volodarsky District, Astrakhan Oblast, Russia. The population was 158 as of 2010. There are 2 streets.

== Geography ==
Talovinka is located on the Kornevaya River, 4 km (2.5 mi) south of Volodarsky (the district's administrative centre) by road. Kzyl-Tan is the nearest rural locality.
