= Gremuchy =

Gremuchy Гремучий
- Settlement
- Interactive map of Gremuchy
- Location within Astrakhan Oblast Location within Russia
- Coordinates: 47°20′N 47°12′E
- Country: Russia
- Region: Astrakhan Oblast
- District: Kharabalinsky District
- Time zone: UTC+4:00

Gremuchy (Russian: Гремучий) is a rural locality (a settlement) in Kharabali, Kharabalinsky District, Astrakhan Oblast, Russia. The population was 147 as of 2010. There are 6 streets.

== Geography ==
Gremuchy is located on the Akhtuba River, 17 km southwest of Kharabali (the district's administrative centre) by road. Kharabali is the nearest rural locality.
