= Funtovo-2 =

Funtovo-2 Фунтово-2
- Selo
- Location within Astrakhan Oblast Location within Russia
- Coordinates: 46°12′N 48°07′E
- Country: Russia
- Region: Astrakhan Oblast
- District: Privolzhsky District
- Time zone: UTC+4:00

Funtovo-2 (Russian: Фунтово-2) is a rural locality (a selo) and the administrative center of Funtovsky Selsoviet, Privolzhsky District, Astrakhan Oblast, Russia. The population was 430 as of 2010. There are 11 streets.

== Geography ==
Funtovo-2 is located 24 km southwest of Nachalovo (the district's administrative centre) by road. Funtovo-1 is the nearest rural locality.
