= Tuzukley =

Tuzukley Тузуклей
- Selo
- Location within Astrakhan Oblast Location within Russia
- Coordinates: 46°08′N 48°19′E
- Country: Russia
- Region: Astrakhan Oblast
- District: Kamyzyaksky District
- Time zone: UTC+4:00

Tuzukley (Russian: Тузуклей) is a rural locality (a selo) and the administrative center of Novotuzukleysky Selsoviet, Kamyzyaksky District, Astrakhan Oblast, Russia. The population was 2,273 as of 2010. There are 22 streets.

== Geography ==
Tuzukley is located 32 km east of Kamyzyak (the district's administrative centre) by road. Trekhizbinka is the nearest rural locality.
