= Meneshau =

Meneshau Менешау
- Settlement
- Location within Astrakhan Oblast Location within Russia
- Coordinates: 46°19′N 48°33′E
- Country: Russia
- Region: Astrakhan Oblast
- District: Volodarsky District
- Time zone: UTC+4:00

Meneshau (Russian: Менешау) is a rural locality (a settlement) in Bolshemogoysky Selsoviet of Volodarsky District, Astrakhan Oblast, Russia. The population was 116 as of 2010. There is 1 street.

== Geography ==
Meneshau is located 11 km (6.8 mi) south of Volodarsky (the district's administrative centre) by road. Boldyrevo is the nearest rural locality.
