= Nikonov, Astrakhan Oblast =

Nikonov Никонов
- Khutor
- Location within Astrakhan Oblast Location within Russia
- Coordinates: 48°31′N 45°43′E
- Country: Russia
- Region: Astrakhan Oblast
- District: Akhtubinsky District
- Time zone: UTC+4:00

Nikonov (Russian: Никонов) is a rural locality (a khutor) in Kapustinoyarsky Selsoviet of Akhtubinsky District, Astrakhan Oblast, Russia. The population was 3 as of 2010.

== Geography ==
It is located 39 km north-west from Akhtubinsk.
