= Gusinoye =

Gusinoye Гусиное
- Selo
- Location within Astrakhan Oblast Location within Russia
- Coordinates: 46°02′N 47°28′E
- Country: Russia
- Region: Astrakhan Oblast
- District: Ikryaninsky District
- Time zone: UTC+4:00

Gusinoye (Russian: Гусиное) is a rural locality (a selo) and the administrative center of Ozernovsky Selsoviet of Ikryaninsky District, Astrakhan Oblast, Russia. The population was 46 as of 2010. There is 1 street.

== Geography ==
Gusinoye is located 29 km west of Ikryanoye (the district's administrative centre) by road. Ozyornoye is the nearest rural locality.
