= Maly Aral =

Maly Aral Малый Арал
- Selo
- Location within Astrakhan Oblast Location within Russia
- Coordinates: 46°39′N 48°27′E
- Country: Russia
- Region: Astrakhan Oblast
- District: Krasnoyarsky District
- Time zone: UTC+4:00

Maly Aral (Russian: Малый Арал) is a rural locality (a selo) in Aksaraysky Selsoviet, Krasnoyarsky District, Astrakhan Oblast, Russia. The population was 513 as of 2010. There are 7 streets.

== Geography ==
Maly Aral is located 23 km northeast of Krasny Yar (the district's administrative centre) by road. Baybek is the nearest rural locality.
