= Dianovka =

Dianovka Диановка
- Settlement
- Location within Astrakhan Oblast Location within Russia
- Coordinates: 46°25′N 48°36′E
- Country: Russia
- Region: Astrakhan Oblast
- District: Volodarsky District
- Time zone: UTC+4:00

Dianovka (Russian: Диановка) is a rural locality (a settlement) in Kozlovsky Selsoviet of Volodarsky District, Astrakhan Oblast, Russia. The population was 98 as of 2010. There are 3 streets.

== Geography ==
Dianovka is located 6 km (3.7 mi) northeast of Volodarsky (the district's administrative centre) by road. Kozlovo is the nearest rural locality.
