= Pereprava Korsaka =

Pereprava Korsaka Переправа Корсака
- Settlement
- Location within Astrakhan Oblast Location within Russia
- Coordinates: 46°36′N 48°16′E
- Country: Russia
- Region: Astrakhan Oblast
- District: Krasnoyarsky District
- Time zone: UTC+4:00

Pereprava Korsaka (Russian: Переправа Корсака) is a rural locality (a settlement) in Baybeksky Selsoviet, Krasnoyarsky District, Astrakhan Oblast, Russia. The population was 52 as of 2010. There are 2 streets.

== Geography ==
It is located on the Akhtuba River, 11 km northwest of Krasny Yar (the district's administrative centre) by road. Podchalyk is the nearest rural locality.
