= Sokrutovka =

Sokrutovka Сокрутовка
- Selo
- Location within Astrakhan Oblast Location within Russia
- Coordinates: 47°54′N 46°32′E
- Country: Russia
- Region: Astrakhan Oblast
- District: Akhtubinsky District
- Time zone: UTC+4:00

Sokrutovka (Russian: Сокрутовка) is a rural locality (a selo) and the administrative center of Sokrutovsky Selsoviet of Akhtubinsky District, Astrakhan Oblast, Russia. The population was 826 as of 2010. There are 22 streets.

== Geography ==
Sokrutovka is located 65 km southeast of Akhtubinsk (the district's administrative centre) by road. Pirogovka is the nearest rural locality.
