= Buzan-pristan =

Buzan-pristan Бузан-пристань
- Settlement
- Location within Astrakhan Oblast Location within Russia
- Coordinates: 46°42′N 48°02′E
- Country: Russia
- Region: Astrakhan Oblast
- District: Krasnoyarsky District
- Time zone: UTC+4:00

Buzan-pristan (Russian: Бузан-пристань) is a rural locality (a settlement) in Seitovsky Selsoviet, Krasnoyarsky District, Astrakhan Oblast, Russia. The population was 473 as of 2010. There are 13 streets.

== Geography ==
It is located on the Buzan River, 37 km northwest of Krasny Yar (the district's administrative centre) by road. Belyachy is the nearest rural locality.
