= Stolbovoy =

Stolbovoy Столбовой
- Settlement
- Location within Astrakhan Oblast Location within Russia
- Coordinates: 46°26′N 48°25′E
- Country: Russia
- Region: Astrakhan Oblast
- District: Volodarsky District

Population (2010)
  - Total: 128
- Time zone: UTC+4:00

Stolbovoy (Russian: Столбовой) is a rural locality (a settlement) in Aktyubinsky Selsoviet of Volodarsky District, Astrakhan Oblast, Russia. The population was 128 as of 2010. There are 2 streets.

== Geography ==
Stolbovoy is located on the Krivaya Srednyaya River, 12 km (7.5 mi) northwest of Volodarsky (the district's administrative centre) by road. Kostyube is the nearest rural locality.
