= Ivanchug =

Ivanchug Иванчуг
- Selo
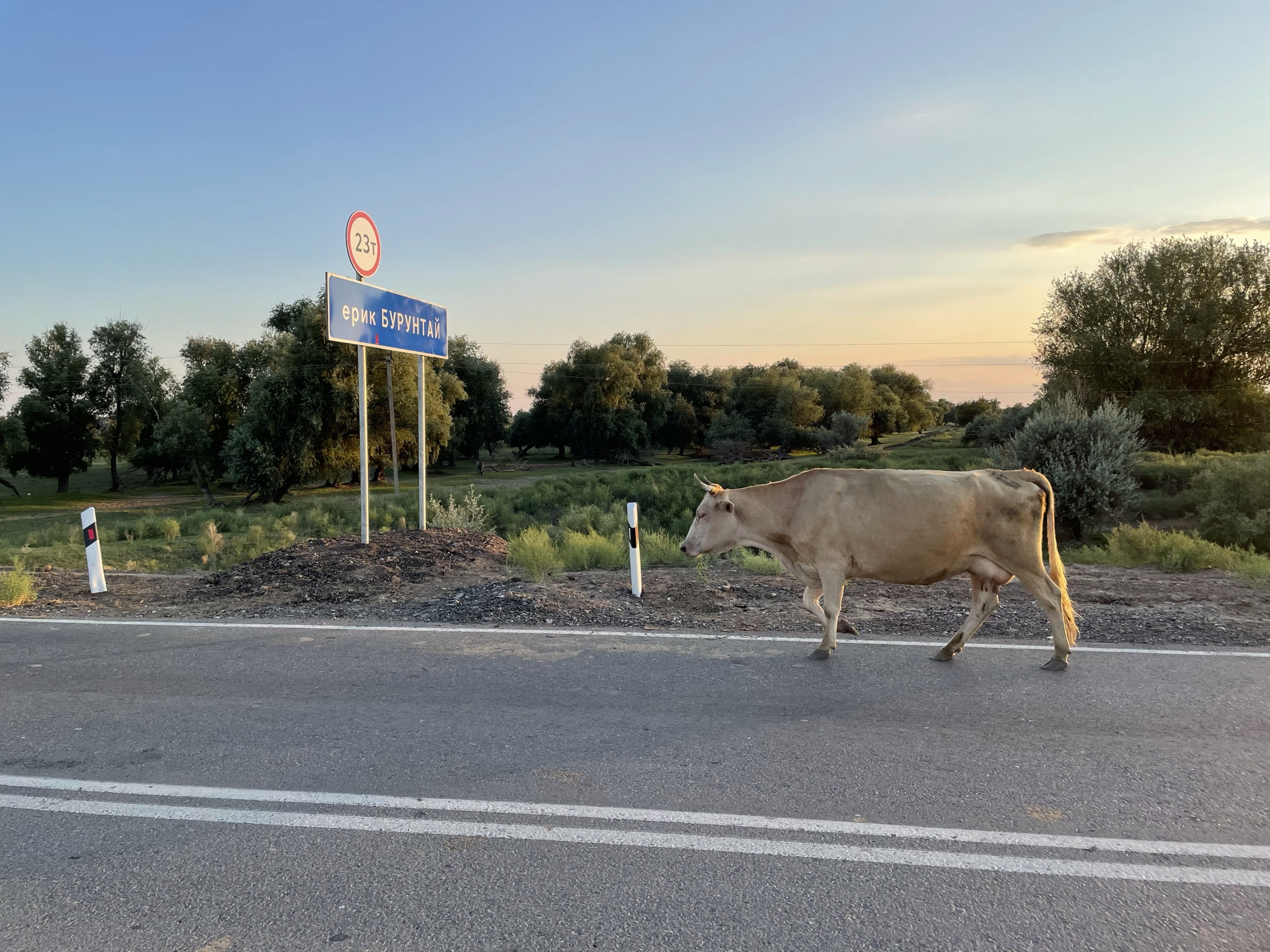

- Location within Astrakhan Oblast Location within Russia
- Coordinates: 46°04′N 47°58′E
- Country: Russia
- Region: Astrakhan Oblast
- District: Kamyzyaksky District
- Time zone: UTC+4:00

Ivanchug (Russian: Иванчуг) is a rural locality (a selo) and the administrative center of Ivanchugsky Selsoviet, Kamyzyaksky District, Astrakhan Oblast, Russia. The population was 1,423 as of 2010. There are 14 streets.

== Geography ==
Ivanchug is located on the Gandurino River, 16 km southwest of Kamyzyak (the district's administrative centre) by road. Uvary is the nearest rural locality.
