= Kaftanka =

Kaftanka Кафтанка
- Settlement
- Location within Astrakhan Oblast Location within Russia
- Coordinates: 46°18′N 48°17′E
- Country: Russia
- Region: Astrakhan Oblast
- District: Privolzhsky District
- Time zone: UTC+4:00

Kaftanka (Russian: Кафтанка) is a rural locality (a settlement) in Kilinchinsky Selsoviet, Privolzhsky District, Astrakhan Oblast, Russia. The population was 31 as of 2010. There is one street.

== Geography ==
Kaftanka is located 14 km southeast of Nachalovo (the district's administrative centre) by road. Biryukovka is the nearest rural locality.
