= Khmelyovka =

Khmelyovka Хмелёвка
- Selo
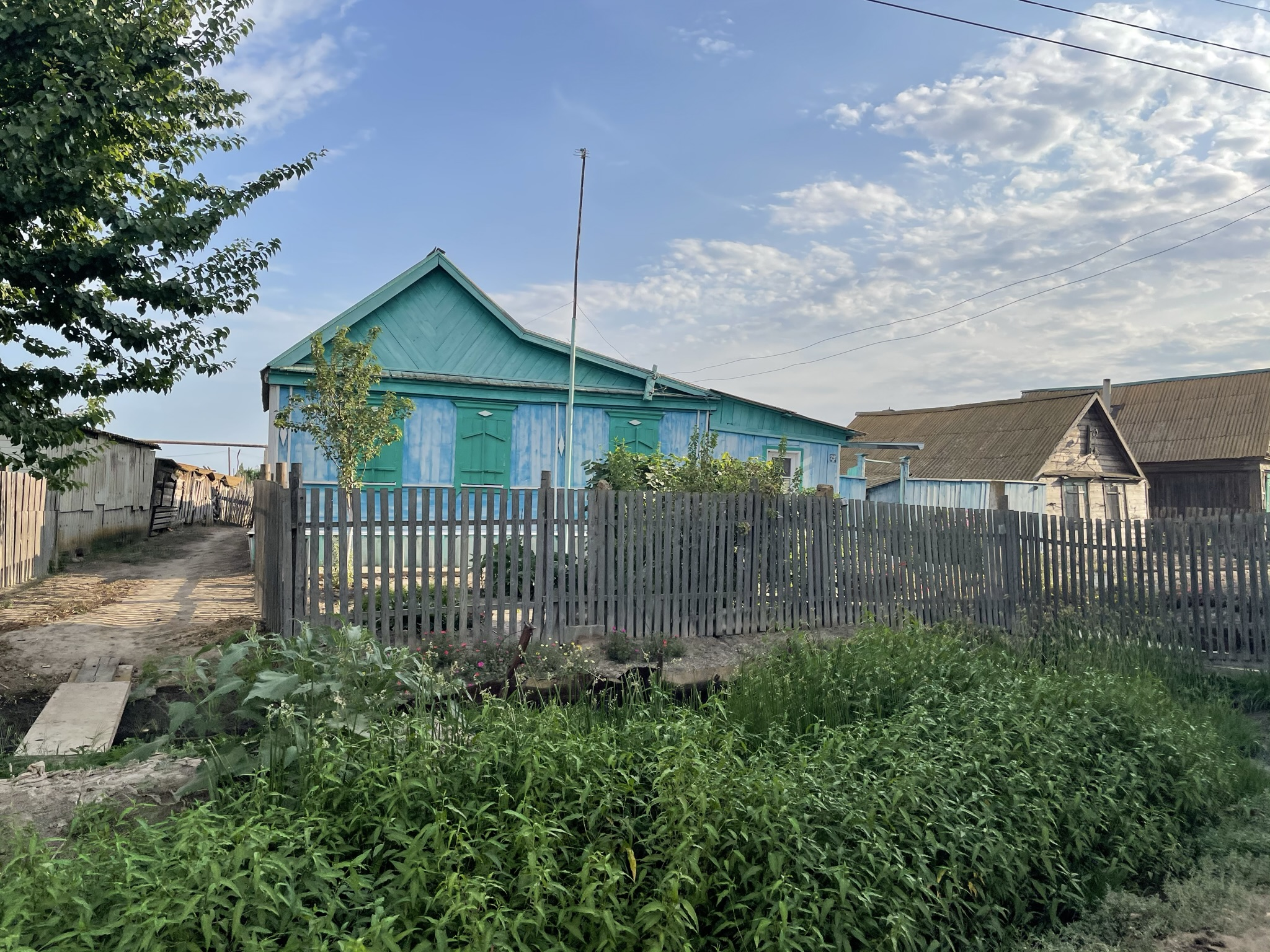

- Location within Astrakhan Oblast Location within Russia
- Coordinates: 46°05′N 47°54′E
- Country: Russia
- Region: Astrakhan Oblast
- District: Kamyzyaksky District
- Time zone: UTC+4:00

Khmelyovka (Russian: Хмелёвка) is a rural locality (a selo) in Ivanchugsky Selsoviet, Kamyzyaksky District, Astrakhan Oblast, Russia. The population was 467 as of 2010. There are 7 streets.

== Geography ==
Khmelyovka is located 25 km west of Kamyzyak (the district's administrative centre) by road. Ivanchug is the nearest rural locality.
