= Kinelle =

Kinelle Кинелле
- Settlement
- Location within Astrakhan Oblast Location within Russia
- Coordinates: 46°14′N 48°13′E
- Country: Russia
- Region: Astrakhan Oblast
- District: Privolzhsky District
- Time zone: UTC+4:00

Kinelle (Russian: Кинелле) is a rural locality (a settlement) in Kilinchinsky Selsoviet, Privolzhsky District, Astrakhan Oblast, Russia. The population was 96 as of 2010. There are 2 streets.

== Geography ==
Kinelle is located 25 km south of Nachalovo (the district's administrative centre) by road. Yevpraksino is the nearest rural locality.
