= Bushma =

Bushma Бушма
- Settlement
- Location within Astrakhan Oblast Location within Russia
- Coordinates: 46°21′N 48°18′E
- Country: Russia
- Region: Astrakhan Oblast
- District: Privolzhsky District
- Time zone: UTC+4:00

Bushma (Russian: Бушма) is a rural locality (a settlement) in Biryukovsky Selsoviet, Privolzhsky District, Astrakhan Oblast, Russia. The population was 262 as of 2010. There are 3 streets.

== Geography ==
Bushma is located 21 km east of Nachalovo (the district's administrative centre) by road. Ivanovsky is the nearest rural locality.
