= Turkmenka =

Turkmenka Туркменка
- Selo
- Location within Astrakhan Oblast Location within Russia
- Coordinates: 46°15′N 47°27′E
- Country: Russia
- Region: Astrakhan Oblast
- District: Narimanovsky District
- Time zone: UTC+4:00

Turkmenka (Russian: Туркменка, Tatar: Yaña awıl) is a rural locality (a selo) in Lineyninsky Selsoviet, Narimanovsky District, Astrakhan Oblast, Russia. The population was 417 as of 2010. There are 3 streets.

== Geography ==
Turkmenka is located 86 km southwest of Narimanov (the district's administrative centre) by road. Lineynaya is the nearest rural locality.
