= Vishnyovy =

Vishnyovy Вишнёвый
- Settlement
- Interactive map of Vishnyovy
- Location within Astrakhan Oblast Location within Russia
- Coordinates: 46°49′N 47°56′E
- Country: Russia
- Region: Astrakhan Oblast
- District: Krasnoyarsky District
- Time zone: UTC+4:00

Vishnyovy (Russian: Вишнёвый) is a rural locality (a settlement) in Akhtubinsky Selsoviet, Krasnoyarsky District, Astrakhan Oblast, Russia. The population was 445 as of 2010. There are 4 streets.

== Geography ==
Vishnyovy is located on the Akhtuba River, 60 km northwest of Krasny Yar (the district's administrative centre) by road. Bakharevsky is the nearest rural locality.
