= Boldinsky =

Boldinsky Болдинский
- Settlement
- Location within Astrakhan Oblast Location within Russia
- Coordinates: 46°19′N 48°15′E
- Country: Russia
- Region: Astrakhan Oblast
- District: Privolzhsky District
- Time zone: UTC+4:00

Boldinsky (Russian: Болдинский) is a rural locality (a settlement) in Nachalovsky Selsoviet, Privolzhsky District, Astrakhan Oblast, Russia. The population was 190 as of 2010. There are 11 streets.

== Geography ==
Boldinsky is located 9 km southeast of Nachalovo (the district's administrative centre) by road. Kilinchi is the nearest rural locality.
