= Tovarny =

Tovarny Товарный
- Settlement
- Location within Astrakhan Oblast Location within Russia
- Coordinates: 45°46′N 47°38′E
- Country: Russia
- Region: Astrakhan Oblast
- District: Ikryaninsky District
- Time zone: UTC+4:00

Tovarny (Russian: Товарный) is a rural locality (a settlement) in Ikryaninsky District, Astrakhan Oblast, Russia. The population was 639 as of 2010. There are 22 streets.

== Geography ==
Tovarny is located 45 km south of Ikryanoye (the district's administrative centre) by road. Mumra is the nearest rural locality.
