= Buruny =

Buruny Буруны
- Settlement
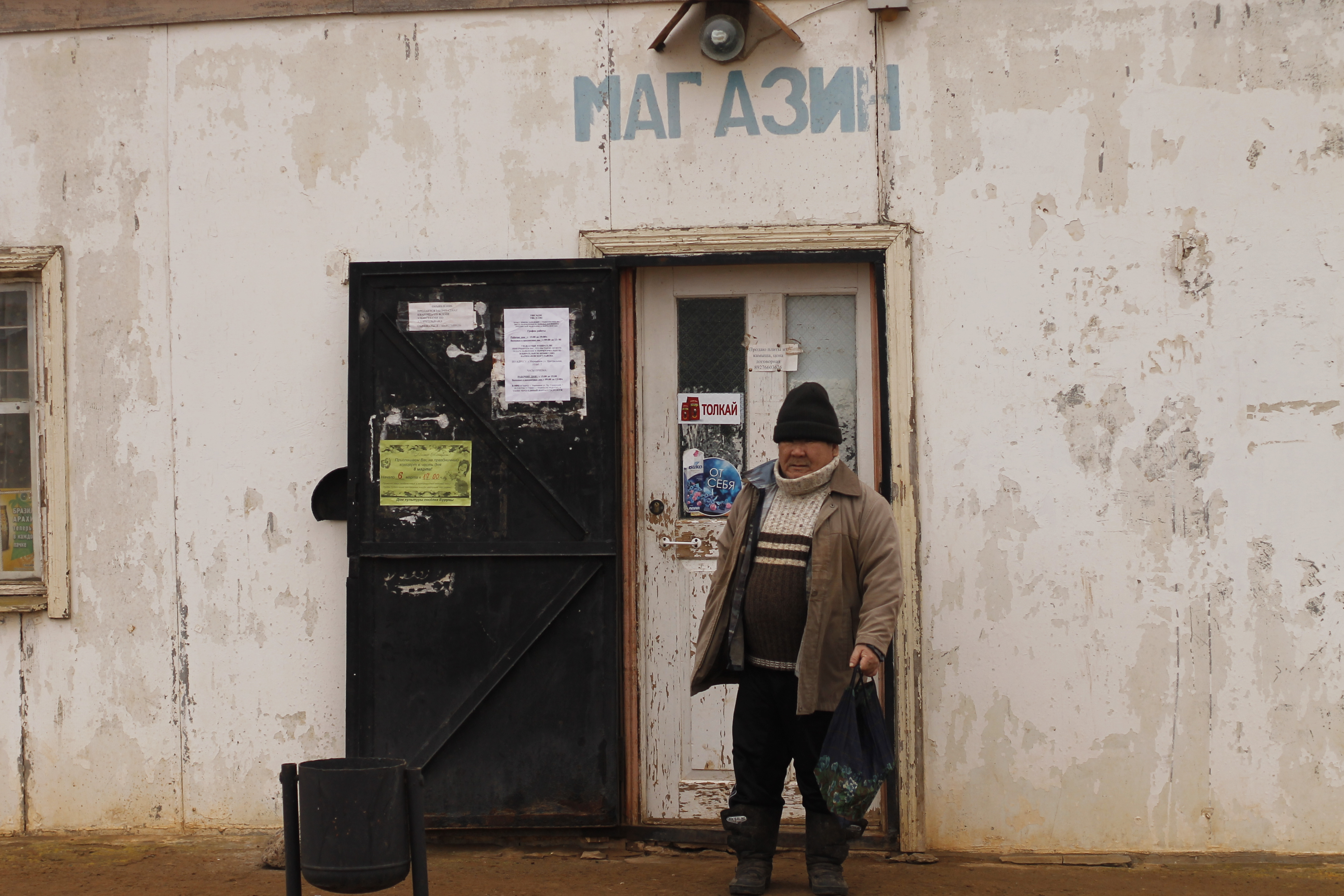
- A grocery store in Buruny

- Location within Astrakhan Oblast Location within Russia
- Coordinates: 46°11′N 47°15′E
- Country: Russia
- Region: Astrakhan Oblast
- District: Narimanovsky District
- Time zone: UTC+4:00

Buruny (Russian: Буруны) is a rural locality (a settlement) and the administrative center of Astrakhansky Selsoviet, Narimanovsky District, Astrakhan Oblast, Russia. The population was 2,147 as of 2010. There are 20 streets.

== Geography ==
Buruny is located 117 km southwest of Narimanov (the district's administrative centre) by road. Razyezd 3 is the nearest rural locality.
