= Pridorozhny =

Pridorozhny Придорожный
- Settlement
- Location within Astrakhan Oblast Location within Russia
- Coordinates: 46°12′N 48°00′E
- Country: Russia
- Region: Astrakhan Oblast
- District: Privolzhsky District
- Time zone: UTC+4:00

Pridorozhny (Russian: Придорожный) is a rural locality (a settlement) in Tatarobashmakovsky Selsoviet, Privolzhsky District, Astrakhan Oblast, Russia. The population was 164 as of 2010. There are 3 streets.

== Geography ==
Pridorozhny is located 36 km southwest of Nachalovo (the district's administrative centre) by road. Atal is the nearest rural locality.
