= Chilimny =

Chilimny Чилимный
- Settlement
- Location within Astrakhan Oblast Location within Russia
- Coordinates: 46°10′N 48°13′E
- Country: Russia
- Region: Astrakhan Oblast
- District: Privolzhsky District
- Time zone: UTC+4:00

Chilimny (Russian: Чилимный) is a rural locality (a settlement) in Kilinchinsky Selsoviet, Privolzhsky District, Astrakhan Oblast, Russia. The population was 46 as of 2010. There is 1 street.

== Geography ==
Chilimny is located 32 km south of Nachalovo (the district's administrative centre) by road. Vesyolaya Griva is the nearest rural locality.
