= Forpost, Astrakhan Oblast =

Forpost Форпост
- Settlement
- Location within Astrakhan Oblast Location within Russia
- Coordinates: 46°01′N 47°49′E
- Country: Russia
- Region: Astrakhan Oblast
- District: Kamyzyaksky District
- Time zone: UTC+4:00

Forpost (Russian: Форпост) is a rural locality (a settlement) in Samosdelsky Selsoviet, Kamyzyaksky District, Astrakhan Oblast, Russia. The population was 30 as of 2010. There is 1 street.

== Geography ==
Forpost is located 72 km southwest of Kamyzyak (the district's administrative centre) by road. Arshin is the nearest rural locality.
