= Vetlyanka =

Vetlyanka Ветлянка
- Selo
- Location within Astrakhan Oblast Location within Russia
- Coordinates: 47°38′N 46°37′E
- Country: Russia
- Region: Astrakhan Oblast
- District: Yenotayevsky District
- Time zone: UTC+4:00

Vetlyanka (Russian: Ветлянка) is a rural locality (a selo) in Vetlyansky Selsoviet of Yenotayevsky District, Astrakhan Oblast, Russia. The population was 609 as of 2010. There are 17 streets. It came to international attention as the site of the beginning of the plague epidemic in the Astrakhan region in November of 1878, which lasted through the following year.

== Geography ==
Vetlyanka is located 58 km northwest of Yenotayevka (the district's administrative centre) by road. Prishib is the nearest rural locality.
