= Obrastsovo-Travino =

Obrastsovo-Travino Образцово-Травино
- Selo
- Location within Astrakhan Oblast Location within Russia
- Coordinates: 45°57′N 48°00′E
- Country: Russia
- Region: Astrakhan Oblast
- District: Kamyzyaksky District
- Time zone: UTC+4:00

Obrastsovo-Travino (Russian: Образцово-Травино) is a rural locality (a selo) and the administrative center of Obrastsovo-Travinsky Selsoviet, Kamyzyaksky District, Astrakhan Oblast, Russia. The population was 2,730 as of 2010. There are 31 streets.

== Geography ==
Obrastsovo-Travino is located 26 km south of Kamyzyak (the district's administrative centre) by road. Nizhnenikolsky is the nearest rural locality.
