= Basinsk =

Basinsk Басинск
- Settlement
- Location within Astrakhan Oblast Location within Russia
- Coordinates: 46°08′N 47°10′E
- Country: Russia
- Region: Astrakhan Oblast
- District: Limansky District
- Time zone: UTC+4:00

Basinsk (Russian: Басинск) is a rural locality (a settlement) in Basinsky Selsoviet, Limansky District, Astrakhan Oblast, Russia. The population was 456 as of 2010. There are 3 streets.

== Geography ==
Basinsk is located 49 km north of Liman (the district's administrative centre) by road. Basinskaya is the nearest rural locality.
