= Novourusovka =

Novourusovka Новоурусовка
- Selo
- Location within Astrakhan Oblast Location within Russia
- Coordinates: 46°40′N 48°03′E
- Country: Russia
- Region: Astrakhan Oblast
- District: Krasnoyarsky District
- Time zone: UTC+4:00

Novourusovka (Russian: Новоурусовка) is a rural locality (a selo) and the administrative center of Buzansky Selsoviet, Krasnoyarsky District, Astrakhan Oblast, Russia. The population was 1,145 as of 2010. There are 24 streets.

== Geography ==
Novourusovka is located 37 km northwest of Krasny Yar (the district's administrative centre) by road. Belyachy is the nearest rural locality.
