= Osypnoy Bugor =

Osypnoy Bugor Осыпной Бугор
- Selo
- Location within Astrakhan Oblast Location within Russia
- Coordinates: 46°17′N 48°03′E
- Country: Russia
- Region: Astrakhan Oblast
- District: Privolzhsky District
- Time zone: UTC+4:00

Osypnoy Bugor (Russian: Осыпной Бугор) is a rural locality (a selo) in Privolzhsky District, Astrakhan Oblast, Russia. The population was 3,381 as of 2010. There are 94 streets.

== Geography ==
Osypnoy Bugor is located 16 km southwest of Nachalovo (the district's administrative centre) by road. Astrakhan is the nearest rural locality.
