= Vesyolaya Griva =

Vesyolaya Griva Весёлая Грива
- Selo
- Location within Astrakhan Oblast Location within Russia
- Coordinates: 46°10′N 48°12′E
- Country: Russia
- Region: Astrakhan Oblast
- District: Privolzhsky District
- Time zone: UTC+4:00

Vesyolaya Griva (Russian: Весёлая Грива) is a rural locality (a selo) in Yevpraksinsky Selsoviet, Privolzhsky District, Astrakhan Oblast, Russia. The population was 290 as of 2010. There are 5 streets.

== Geography ==
Vesyolaya Griva is located 34 km south of Nachalovo (the district's administrative centre) by road. Semibugry is the nearest rural locality.
