= Steklozavoda =

Steklozavoda Стеклозавода
- Settlement
- Location within Astrakhan Oblast Location within Russia
- Coordinates: 46°14′N 47°59′E
- Country: Russia
- Region: Astrakhan Oblast
- District: Privolzhsky District
- Time zone: UTC+4:00

Steklozavoda (Russian: Стеклозавода) is a rural locality (a settlement) in Tatarobashmakovsky Selsoviet, Privolzhsky District, Astrakhan Oblast, Russia. The population was 958 as of 2010. There are 13 streets.

== Geography ==
Steklozavoda is located 31 km southwest of Nachalovo (the district's administrative centre) by road. Tatarskaya Bashmakovka is the nearest rural locality.
