= Kalnovka =

Kalnovka Кальновка
- Selo
- Location within Astrakhan Oblast Location within Russia
- Coordinates: 48°19′N 45°36′E
- Country: Russia
- Region: Astrakhan Oblast
- District: Chernoyarsky District
- Time zone: UTC+4:00

Kalnovka (Russian: Кальновка) is a rural locality (a selo) in Vyazovsky Selsoviet, Chernoyarsky District, Astrakhan Oblast, Russia. The population was 102 as of 2010. There are 2 streets.

== Geography ==
Kalnovka is located on the Podgornoye Lake, 54 km northwest of Chyorny Yar (the district's administrative centre) by road. Vyazovka is the nearest rural locality.
