= Buzan-razezd =

Buzan-razezd Бузан-разъезд
- Settlement
- Location within Astrakhan Oblast Location within Russia
- Coordinates: 46°43′N 48°01′E
- Country: Russia
- Region: Astrakhan Oblast
- District: Krasnoyarsky District
- Time zone: UTC+4:00

Buzan-razezd (Russian: Бузан-разъезд) is a rural locality (a settlement) in Seitovsky Selsoviet, Krasnoyarsky District, Astrakhan Oblast, Russia. The population was 10 as of 2010.
