= Blinovo =

Blinovo Блиново
- Selo
- Location within Astrakhan Oblast Location within Russia
- Coordinates: 46°15′N 48°52′E
- Country: Russia
- Region: Astrakhan Oblast
- District: Volodarsky District
- Time zone: UTC+4:00

Blinovo (Russian: Блиново) is a rural locality (a selo) in Multanovsky Selsoviet of Volodarsky District, Astrakhan Oblast, Russia. The population was 283 as of 2010. There is 1 street.

== Geography ==
Blinovo is located 37 km (23 mi) southeast of Volodarsky (the district's administrative centre) by road. Novovasilyevo is the nearest rural locality.
