= Cheryomukha =

Cheryomukha Черёмуха
- Selo
- Location within Astrakhan Oblast Location within Russia
- Coordinates: 46°30′N 48°22′E
- Country: Russia
- Region: Astrakhan Oblast
- District: Krasnoyarsky District
- Time zone: UTC+4:00

Cheryomukha (Russian: Черёмуха) is a rural locality (a selo) in Krasnoyarsky Selsoviet, Krasnoyarsky District, Astrakhan Oblast, Russia. The population was 1,157 as of 2010. There are 18 streets.

== Geography ==
Cheryomukha is located 5 km south of Krasny Yar (the district's administrative centre) by road. Krasny Yar is the nearest rural locality.
