= Solonchak, Astrakhan Oblast =

Solonchak Солончак
- Settlement
- Location within Astrakhan Oblast Location within Russia
- Coordinates: 48°14′N 46°42′E
- Country: Russia
- Region: Astrakhan Oblast
- District: Akhtubinsky District
- Time zone: UTC+4:00

Solonchak (Russian: Солончак) is a rural locality (a settlement) in "Posyolok Verkhny Baskunchak" of Akhtubinsky District, Astrakhan Oblast, Russia. The population was 7 as of 2010.
