= Kostybe =

Kostybe Костюбе
- Settlement
- Location within Astrakhan Oblast Location within Russia
- Coordinates: 46°25′N 48°26′E
- Country: Russia
- Region: Astrakhan Oblast
- District: Volodarsky District
- Time zone: UTC+4:00

Kostybe (Russian: Костюбе) is a rural locality (a settlement) in Aktyubinsky Selsoviet of Volodarsky District, Astrakhan Oblast, Russia. The population was 528 as of 2010. There are 8 streets.

== Geography ==
Kostybe is located on the Ilmametyev River, 11 km (6.8 mi) northwest of Volodarsky (the district's administrative centre) by road. Stolbovoy is the nearest rural locality.
