= Altynzhar =

Altynzhar Алтынжар
- Selo
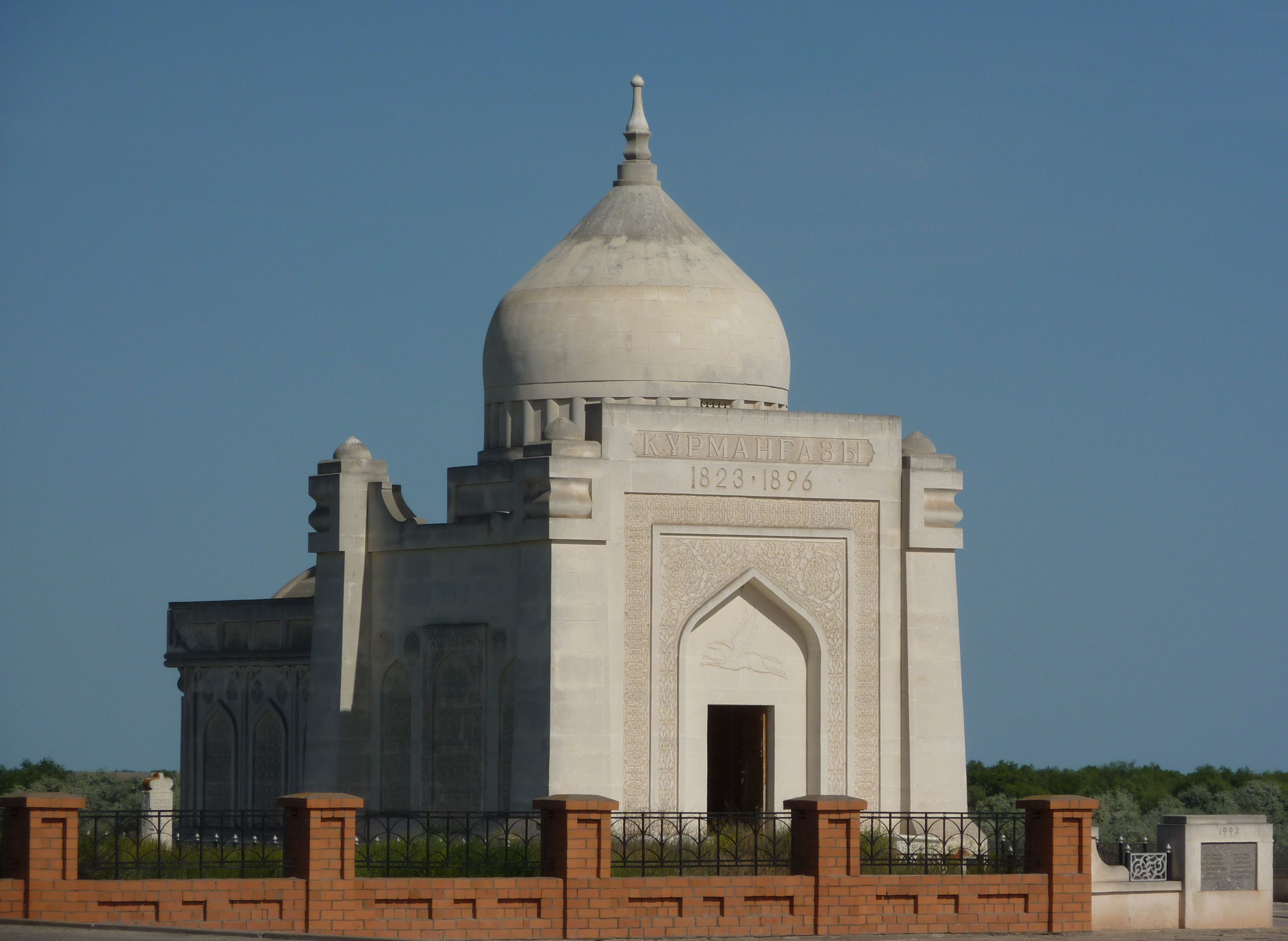

- Location within Astrakhan Oblast Location within Russia
- Coordinates: 46°16′N 48°30′E
- Country: Russia
- Region: Astrakhan Oblast
- District: Volodarsky District
- Time zone: UTC+4:00

Altynzhar (Russian: Алтынжар) is a rural locality (a selo) and the administrative center of Altynzharsky Selsoviet of Volodarsky District, Astrakhan Oblast, Russia. The population was 998 as of 2010. There are 18 streets.

== Geography ==
It is located on the Karazhar River, 18 km (11 mi) south of Volodarsky (the district's administrative centre) by road. Koshevanka is the nearest rural locality.

== Gallery ==
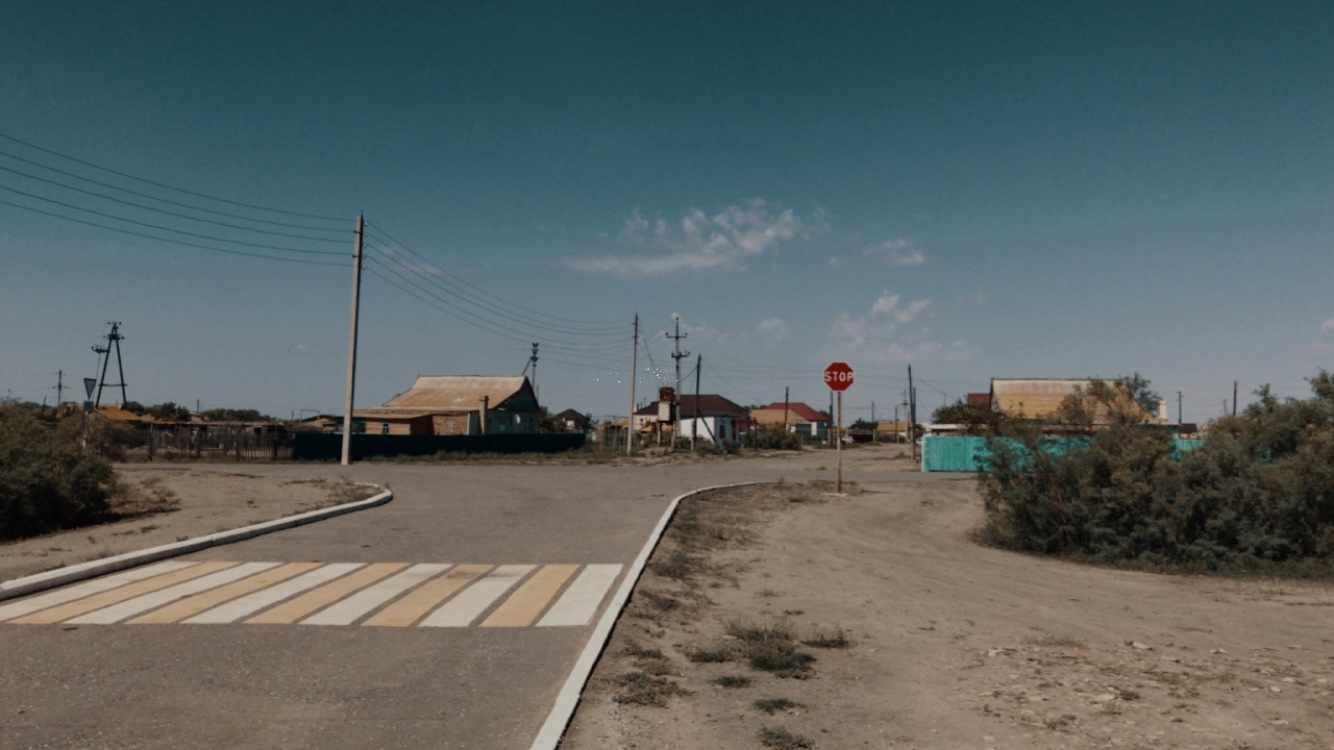
Novostroynaya Street in Altynzhar

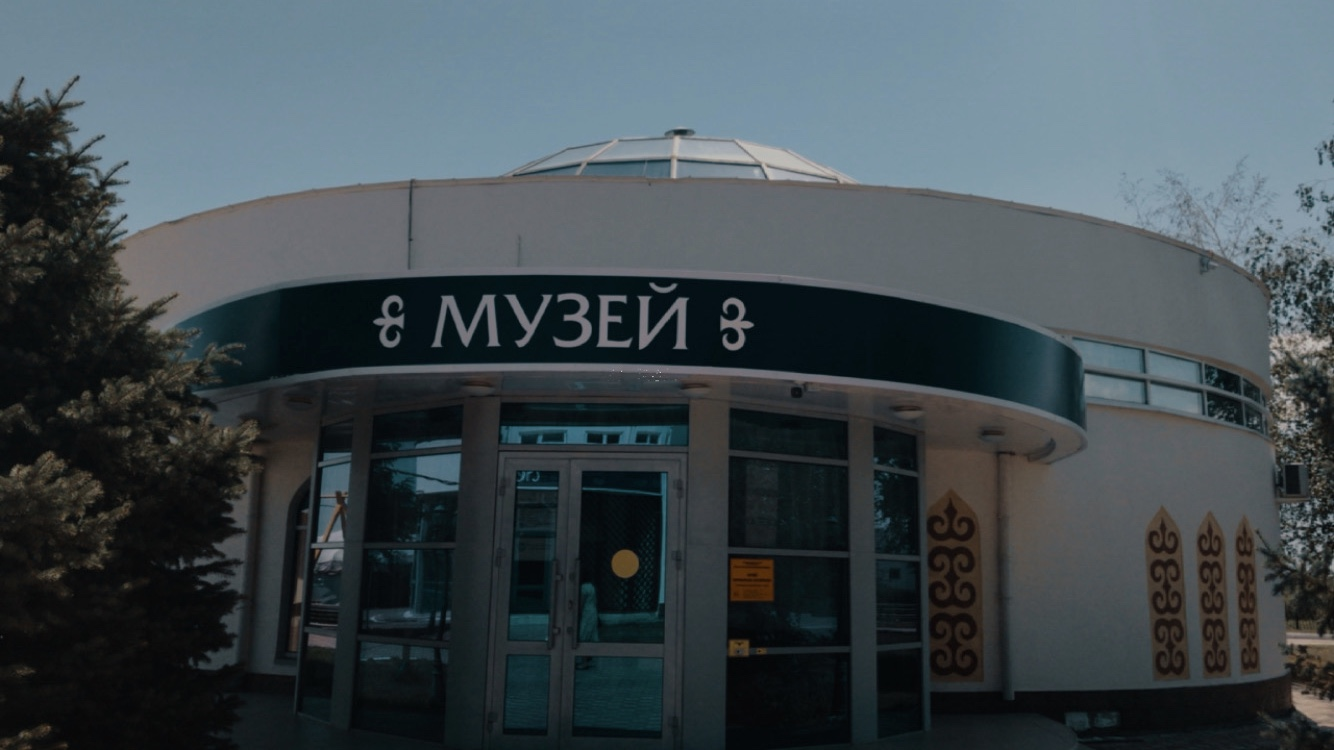
The Kurmangazy Museum

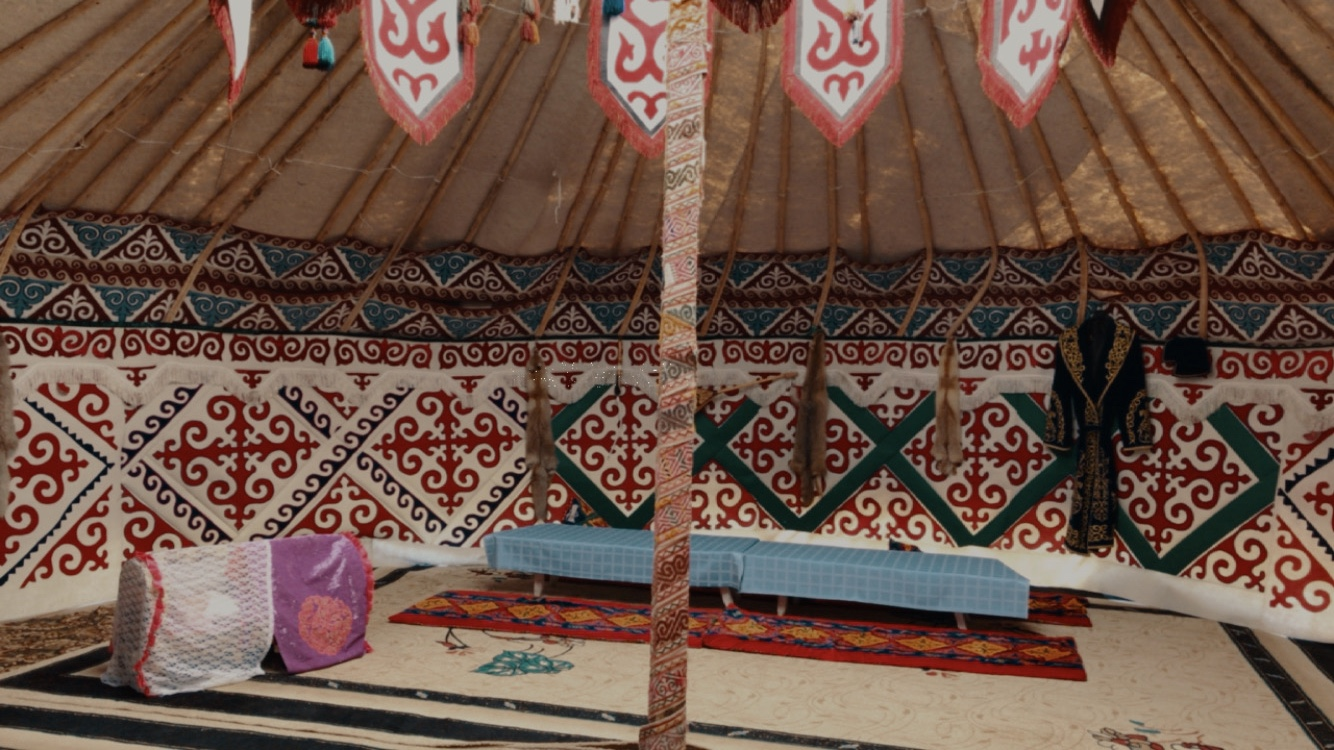
A Kazakh yurt by the museum

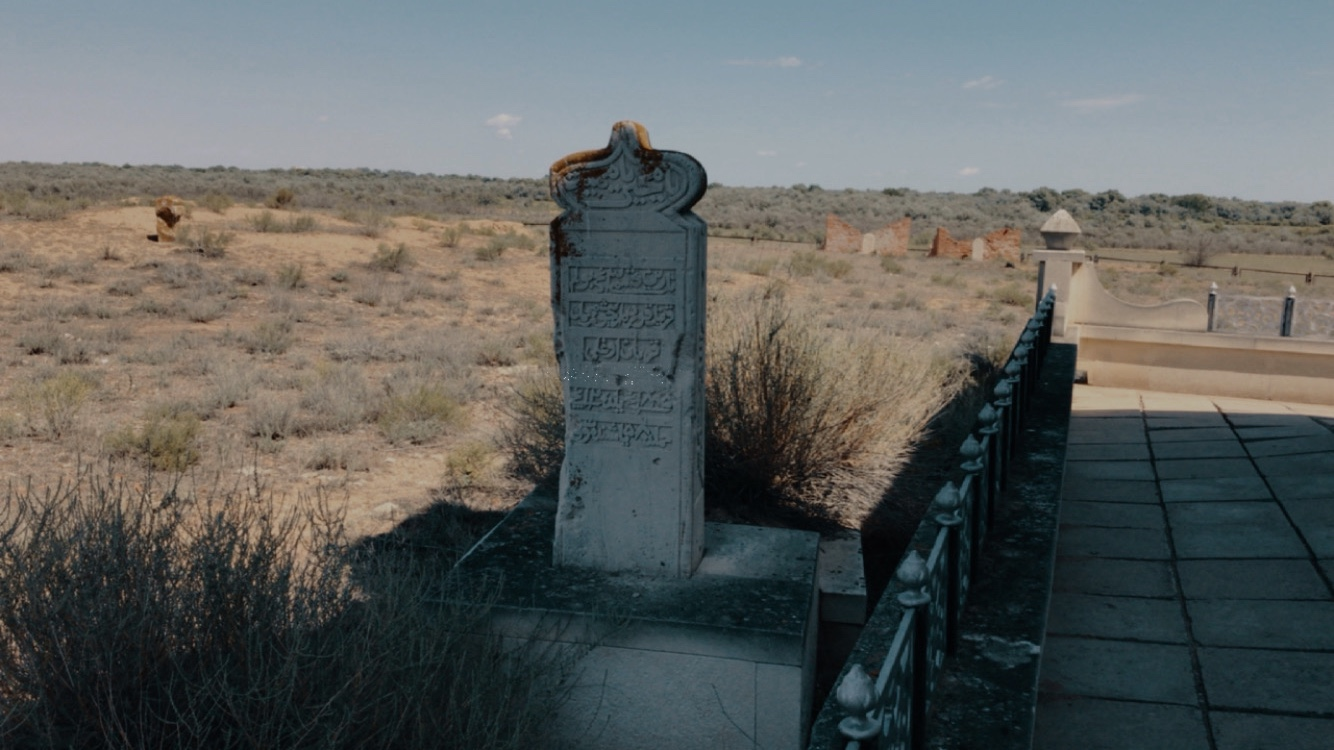
An old grave at the local cemetery
