= Batayevka =

Batayevka Батаевка
- Selo
- Location within Astrakhan Oblast Location within Russia
- Coordinates: 48°08′N 46°17′E
- Country: Russia
- Region: Astrakhan Oblast
- District: Akhtubinsky District
- Time zone: UTC+4:00

Batayevka (Russian: Батаевка) is a rural locality (a selo) and the administrative center of Batayevsky Selsoviet of Akhtubinsky District, Astrakhan Oblast, Russia. The population was 543 as of 2010. There are 16 streets.

== Geography ==
Batayevka is located 25 km (16 mi) southeast of Akhtubinsk (the district's administrative centre) by road. Uspenka is the nearest rural locality.
