= Sredny Baskunchak =

Sredny Baskunchak Средний Баскунчак
- Settlement
- Location within Astrakhan Oblast Location within Russia
- Coordinates: 48°12′N 46°47′E
- Country: Russia
- Region: Astrakhan Oblast
- District: Akhtubinsky District
- Time zone: UTC+4:00

Sredny Baskunchak (Russian: Средний Баскунчак) is a rural locality (a settlement) in "Posyolok Nizhny Baskunchak" of Akhtubinsky District, Astrakhan Oblast, Russia. The population was 365 as of 2010. There are 7 streets.

== Geography ==
Sredny Baskunchak is located 50 km east of Akhtubinsk (the district's administrative centre) by road. Nizhny Baskunchak is the nearest rural locality.
