= Tyurino =

Tyurino Тюрино
- Selo
- Location within Astrakhan Oblast Location within Russia
- Coordinates: 46°26′N 48°37′E
- Country: Russia
- Region: Astrakhan Oblast
- District: Volodarsky District
- Time zone: UTC+4:00

Tyurino (Russian: Тюрино) is a rural locality (a selo) in Kozlovsky Selsoviet of Volodarsky District, Astrakhan Oblast, Russia. The population was 525 as of 2010. There are 4 streets.

== Geography ==
Tyurino is located 28 km (17 mi) northeast of Volodarsky (the district's administrative centre) by road. Dianovka is the nearest rural locality.
