= Posyolok Anatoliya Zvereva =

Posyolok Anatoliya Zvereva Посёлок Анатолия Зверева
- Settlement
- Location within Astrakhan Oblast Location within Russia
- Coordinates: 46°08′N 47°47′E
- Country: Russia
- Region: Astrakhan Oblast
- District: Ikryaninsky District
- Time zone: UTC+4:00

Posyolok Anatoliya Zvereva (Russian: Посёлок Анатолия Зверева) is a rural locality (a settlement) in Ikryaninsky District, Astrakhan Oblast, Russia. The population was 518 as of 2010. There are 11 streets.

== Geography ==
Posyolok Anatoliya Zvereva is located 8 km northeast of Ikryanoye (the district's administrative centre) by road. Bakhtemir is the nearest rural locality.
