= Astrakhan metropolitan area =

Astrakhan metropolitan area Астраханская агломерация
- Metropolitan area
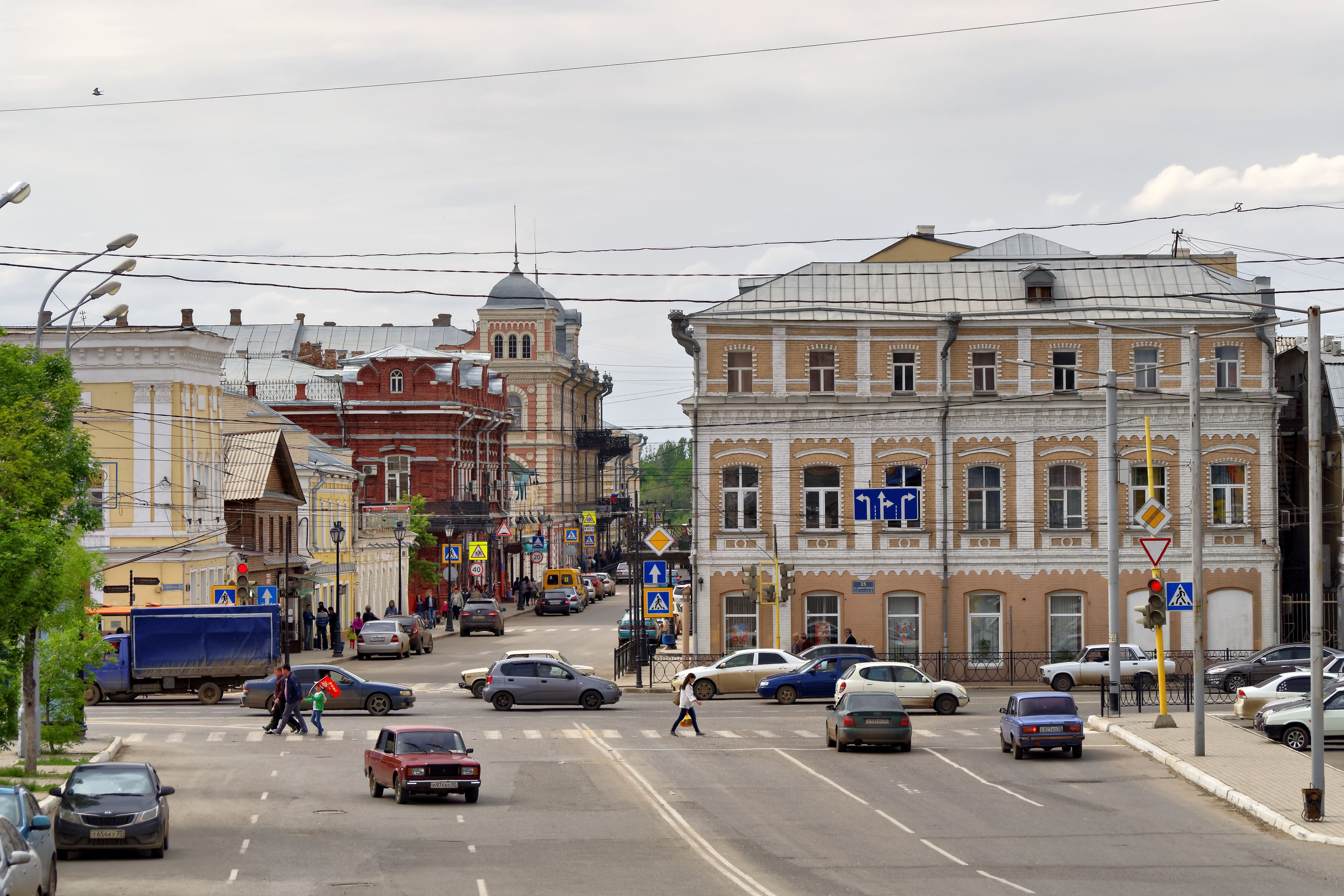

- Location within Astrakhan Oblast Location within Russia
- Coordinates: 46.3476°N 48.0301°E
- Country: Russia
- Region: Astrakhan Oblast

Population
  - Total: 810,763
- Time zone: UTC+4:00

The Astrakhan metropolitan area (Russian: Астраханская агломерация) is a metropolitan area in the Volga Delta area of Astrakhan Oblast, Russia centered around its capital city, Astrakhan.

It is one of the most multicultural urban areas in the country. The three largest ethnic communities are Russians (58.9%), Kazakhs (14.3%) and Tatars (7.3%). Various Dagestani peoples make up a few more percent. Smaller but significant communities include Armenians, Ukrainians, Chechens, Jews and the Roma.

== Borders ==
While the term agglomeration, synonymous to metro area, is commonly used by various government agencies and media outlets in Russia, it does not have a legal definition. That makes precise population and area figures as well as definite borders unavailable for most such areas in the country. This is the case for Astrakhan, too. A map by the Ministry of Transport suggests that the metropolitan region covers the entirety of Astrakhan City and Privolzhsky District as well as parts of Kamyzyaksky, Ikryaninsky, Krasnoyarsky, Narimanovsky, and Volodarsky districts. It does not specify which municipalities of the latter districts belong to the agglomeration and only shows a rough approximation of where it ends, so all of these districts will be counted in their entirety when it comes to population figures on this page.

The metropolitan area includes ten localities with a population of over 5,000 people each, as well as dozens of smaller villages scattered between them.

Locality	Type	Population
Astrakhan	city, oblast seat	529,793
Kamyzyak	city, district seat	15,749
Krasny Yar	village, district seat	12,214
Narimanov	city, district seat	10,764
Volodarsky	settlement, district seat	10,136
Ikryanoye	village, district seat	10,036
Krasnye Barrikady	settlement	6,397
Starokucherganovka	village	6,343
Nachalovo	village, district seat	5,451
Solyanka	village	5,332
