= Astrakhan Jews =

Culturally heterogeneous group

Astrakhan Jews יהדות אסטרחן Астраханские евреи
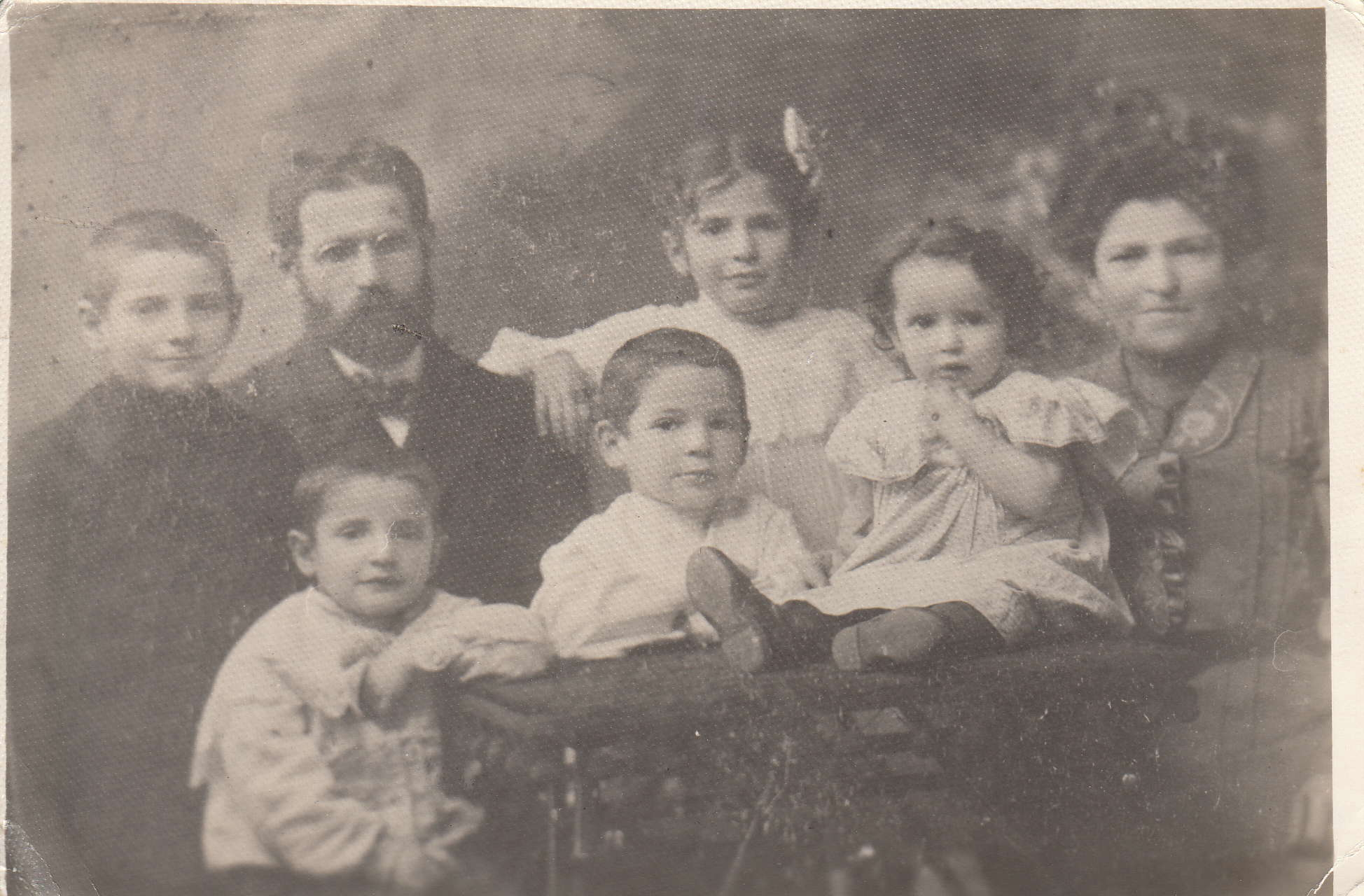
- Astrakhan rabbi with his family

Total population
- c. 5,000

Regions with significant populations
- Astrakhan: 3,000
- Israel: 436

Languages
- Russian, Hebrew, Yiddish, Bukhori, Juhuri

Religion
- Judaism, other (including atheism)

Astrakhan Jews are people of Jewish ethnicity and faith originating from or living in the historically Central Asian city and region of Astrakhan in South-Western Russia. They are a culturally heterogenous entity, coming from various sub-ethnic backgrounds such as Ashkenazi, Juhuri, Sephardi and Bukhori, but share a common Jewish identity and form a united community.

== History ==
The first significant group of followers of Judaism in Astrakhan were the Turkic-speaking Khazars who disappeared as a khaganate and a distinct ethnic group over a millennium ago. After that, there was no significant Jewish population in and around Astrakhan until the 18th century, occasional Bukhori and Juhuri merchants being the only known exception.

The Jews of the Russian Empire were granted the right to settle in the area in 1791, and the first known Russian Jewish settler in Astrakhan was Leiba Davydov from Viciebsk. Virtually all Jews living in Astrakhan were Ashkenazi, until an influx of Mountain Jewish settlers began around 1850. Many of them settled in the southern part of the Old Town to the west of the Bolshiye Isady market along and around the street now known as Shaumyana. The quarter was informally known as Jewish Street or Jewish Town.

== Religion ==
Even though historically Astrakhan had four synagogues, only one exists today. It was originally built in 1879, but was then destroyed in the 20th century and rebuilt in the same place in 2003. It is located within the historically Jewish quarter, on the street now known as Babushkina (historically Katolicheskaya after the Catholic church located in its opposite end). It was originally maintained and frequented by the local Sephardic community and thus called Sphard. It still bears this name, even though many of the regular worshippers, including the current rabbi, are Ashkenazi. The bigger Ashkenazi synagogue was demolished by the order of the Soviet government during its anti-religious campaign.

Another synagogue was built during/after World War I, in the 1910s. It was designed by two Hungarian prisoners (Teofil Makra, Sándor Gerő) of war who were interned there and won the construction in a design competition.

== Language ==
The Jews who remain in Astrakhan typically speak Russian as their native language, with some being native or fluent in various Jewish languages such as Juhuri, Yiddish and Bukhori. Those who practice Judaism are also familiar with Hebrew.

== Notable people ==
Sergey Lagodinsky - lawyer and politician.
