= Russian Institute of Theatre Arts =

Theatrical academy in Moscow Russia

Russian Institute of Theatre Arts – GITIS
- Российский институт театрального искусства – ГИТИС
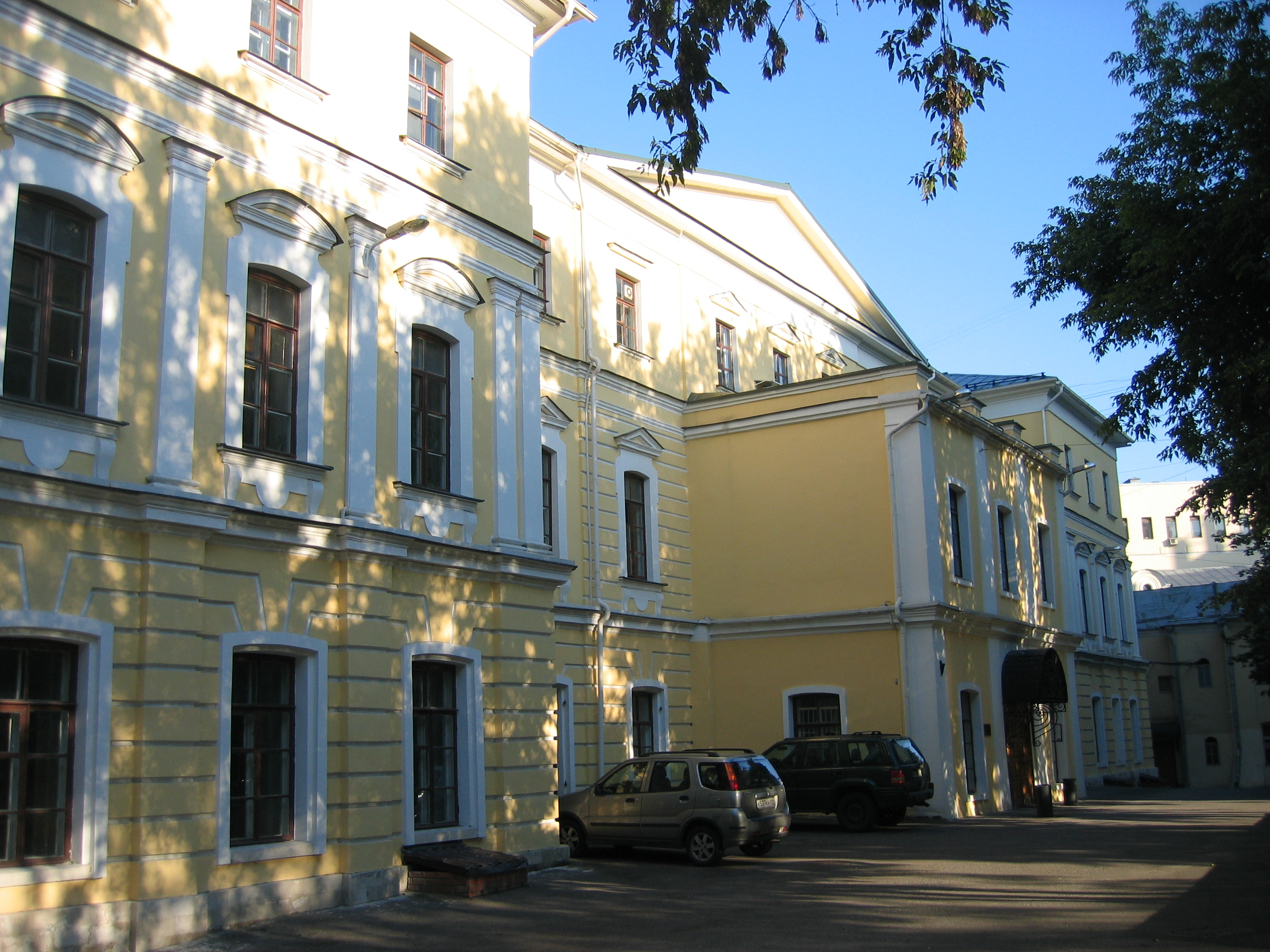
- Former name: State Institute of Theatre Arts (Gosudarstvenniy institut teatralnogo iskusstva/GITIS)
- Type: Public
- Established: 22 September 1878
- Rector: Григорий Заславский
- Head of International Department: Natalia Plusnina
- Faculty: 185
- Students: 1,500
- Location: 6 Maly Kislovsky, Moscow, Moscow, Russia, Russian Federation; 55.755°N 37.603°E
- Campus: Urban
- Website: gitis.net/en/

The Russian Institute of Theatre Arts (GITIS) (Russian: Российский институт театрального искусства – ГИТИС, romanized: Rossiyskiy institut teatralnogo iskusstva – GITIS) is the largest and oldest independent theatrical arts school in Russia. Located in Moscow, the school was founded on 22 September 1878 as the Shostakovsky Music School. It became the School of Music and Drama of the Moscow Philharmonic Society in 1883, was elevated to the status of a conservatory in 1886 during which time the institution was colloquially referred to as the Philharmonic Conservatory. It was renamed the Institute of Music and Drama in 1918, and was known as the Lunacharsky State Institute for Theatre Arts (GITIS) from 1934 to 1991.

== Mission and background ==
GITIS trains students in various professions in the theatrical arts (including ballet, acting, etc.) and simultaneously provides a traditional university education in liberal arts and humanities. Approximately 1,500 students, qualification-advancement students, and post-graduate students from various countries study at GITIS.

== History ==
=== Nineteenth century ===
The university was founded as the Shestakovskiy Music School for Coming People in Moscow at the end of the 19th century, patronized by the Society of Musical and Dramatic Arts Lovers. In 1883 the Society was renamed the Moscow Philharmonic Society and the school obtained the status of Specialized School of Music and Drama, subordinated by the Society.

Drama classes of the musical-drama school were headed by actors, teachers and theatrical figures such as Alexander Yuzhin (1883–1889), Osyp Pravdin (1889–1891) and Vladimir Nemirovich-Danchenko (1891–1901). The 1898 class graduates included Olga Knipper, Margarita Savitskaya, and Vsevolod Meyerhold.

=== Twentieth century ===
In 1902, the school moved into the antique Soldatenkov Family building at Maly Kislovsky, where it has been located since. On 24 October 1903 "The Charter of Musical-Drama School of the Moscow Philharmonic Society under the protection of Her Imperial Highness Princess Elisaveta Fedorovna" was approved. According to the Charter, the School was a department of the Ministry of Internal Affairs.

Since the Revolution in Russia of 1917, the Musical-Drama School has undergone a number of reorganization and changes of names caused by reforms in the state education system. In August 1922, the school was renamed the State Institute of Musical Drama and was joined with Vsevolod Meyerhold's State Theatrical Workshops. This association received the name of State Institute of Theatrical Art – GITIS. The official date of its formation was 17 September 1922.

In June 1923, the State Practical Institute of Choreography joined GITIS as a separate department and the plan was achieved.

In 1924, the existing theatrical institutes of Moscow and St.Petersburg were closed by Sovnarkom Edict because "of failures in the quality of theatrical education," but in spite of this, GITIS was authorized to graduate students in the accelerated manner. Clubs by interests and the club movement actively developed those years, were the main stimulus for the subsequent creation of theatrically instructor classes on the basis of already disbanded GITIS. In 1925 the Central technical school of a theatrical art (CETETIS) an educational institution with the four-year training was created.

In 1926, on the basis of graduates of GITIS and CETETIS theatre, Musical Drama in Zamoskvorechye has been generated.

On 2 August 1931 by decision of Sovnarkom RSFSR "About reorganization of system of art education in RSFSR", regulated activity of art higher educational institutions has been published. And on 1 October of the same year the theatrical high school was created by Sovnarkom order which has received the name already familiar to all – GITIS.

In July 1935 Theatrical Combine again transformed to the State Institute of Theatrical Art with three faculties: production management (with three years training), directing (with four years training), acting (with four years training). The Faculty of those years in GITIS were such known theatrical figures as Serafima Birman, Leonid Baratov, Boris Mordvinov, Boris Sushkevich, Leonid Leonidov, Mikhail Tarkhanov, Vasily Sakhnovsky, Olga Pyzhova, Boris Bibikov, Olga Androvskaya, Yosif Raevsky, Vasily Orlov, Andrey Lobanov, Mikhail Astangov, Ilya Sudakov, Yury Zavadsky.

==== World War Two ====
After the beginning of Second World War in September – October 1941 the education process in GITIS has been temporarily stopped. GITIS students were evacuated from Moscow to Saratov on 23 October. The GITIS Front Theater was organized out of acting and directing faculties graduates in the summer of 1942 in Saratov. It made its contribution to a movement of front theaters in Second World War. For one thousand four hundred eighteen days of war the theater has given more than one thousand and five hundred performances. Many GITIS graduates, students and teachers were fighting at several fronts.

==== Post-war years ====
In post-war years GITIS is widely growing. Few new faculties were organized. In 1946 faculty of a choreography has been created. Since 1958 GITIS Educational Theater was opened. GITIS Theater known for many theater productions and playing the major in preparation of students for all theatrical specialties.

In 1991, the status of an academy was given to GITIS, and the Institute was renamed as the Russian Academy of Theater Arts – GITIS.

== Present day ==
Today the Russian University of Theatre Arts (GITIS) is integrated into the world system of theatrical education. There are 8 faculties at the Russian University of Theatre Arts (GITIS).

== Faculties ==
Acting, Directing, Musical Theater, Theater Studies, Choreography, New Directions in Performing Arts, Producing and Scenography.

== Alumni ==
- Yuliya Abakumovskaya (born 1942), Russian mezzo-soprano
- Jurij Alschitz (born 1947), Ukrainian-German theatre director, educator and researcher
- Dmitry Bertman (born 1967), theatre and opera director
- Mikhail Butkevich (1926–1995), theatre director and professor
- Nazim Baykishiyev (1948–2025), Azerbaijani artist and stage designer
- Anatoly Efros (1925–1987), theatre and film director
- Pyotr Fomenko (1932–2012), film and theatre director, educator and artistic director
- Audronė Girdzijauskaitė (born 1938), Lithuanian writer, theater scholar, art critic and historian
- Simion Ghimpu (1939–2010) Moldovan writer, poet, and essayist
- Jerzy Grotowski (1933–1999), Polish theatre director and dramatic theorist
- Angel Gutierrez, niño de Rusia, theater director and actor, founder of Chekhov Theatre in Madrid, one of the most important popularizers of Chekhov in Spain.
- Elena Gutiérrez (born 1944), Costa Rican-Chilean ballet dancer and choreographer
- Tankho Israelov (1917–1981) ballet dancer and choreographer
- Chulpan Khamatova (born 1975), actress
- Igor Korošec (born 1972), Slovenian-Russian actor
- Alim Kouliev (born 1959), Soviet-born American actor, theatre director and screenwriter
- Savely Kramarov (1934–1995) Russian–American actor and comedian.
- Lev Leshchenko (born 1942), singer
- Māris Liepa (1936–1989), Latvian and Soviet ballet dancer
- Olga Lyubimova (born 1980), politician
- Erkin Mademilova (1929–2018), Kyrgyz ballet dancer
- Alexandre Marine (born 1958), actor. theatre director and playwright
- Eimuntas Nekrošius (1952–2018), Lithuanian theatre director
- Elena Nikolaeva (born 1983), actress
- Alla Pugacheva (born 1949), singer and songwriter
- Tatiana Samoilova (1934–2014), actress
- Larisa Sinelshchikova (born 1963), media manager and producer
- Tatyana Shmyga (1928–2011), opera singer and actress
- Georgy Tovstonogov (1915–989) Georgian and Soviet theatre director.
- Anatoly Vasiliev (born 1942), theatre director
- Roman Viktyuk (1936–2020), theatre director, actor and screenwriter
- Mark Zakharov (1933–2019), theater and film director
- Andrey Zvyagintsev (born 1964), actor and film director
- Skënder Selimi (1933–2015), Albanian ballet master, choreographer and professor
- Mariya Fomina (born 1993), actress
- Sergei Yakushev (1910–1995), Azerbaijani and Soviet actor

== Sources ==
- A. Yu. Smoliakov Тот самый ГИТИС. – (Moscow: Алгоритм-Книга, 2004. – 288 p.) – ISBN 5-9265-0141-5.
