= Yamgurchev =

Yamgurchev Ямгурчев
- Neighborhood of Astrakhan
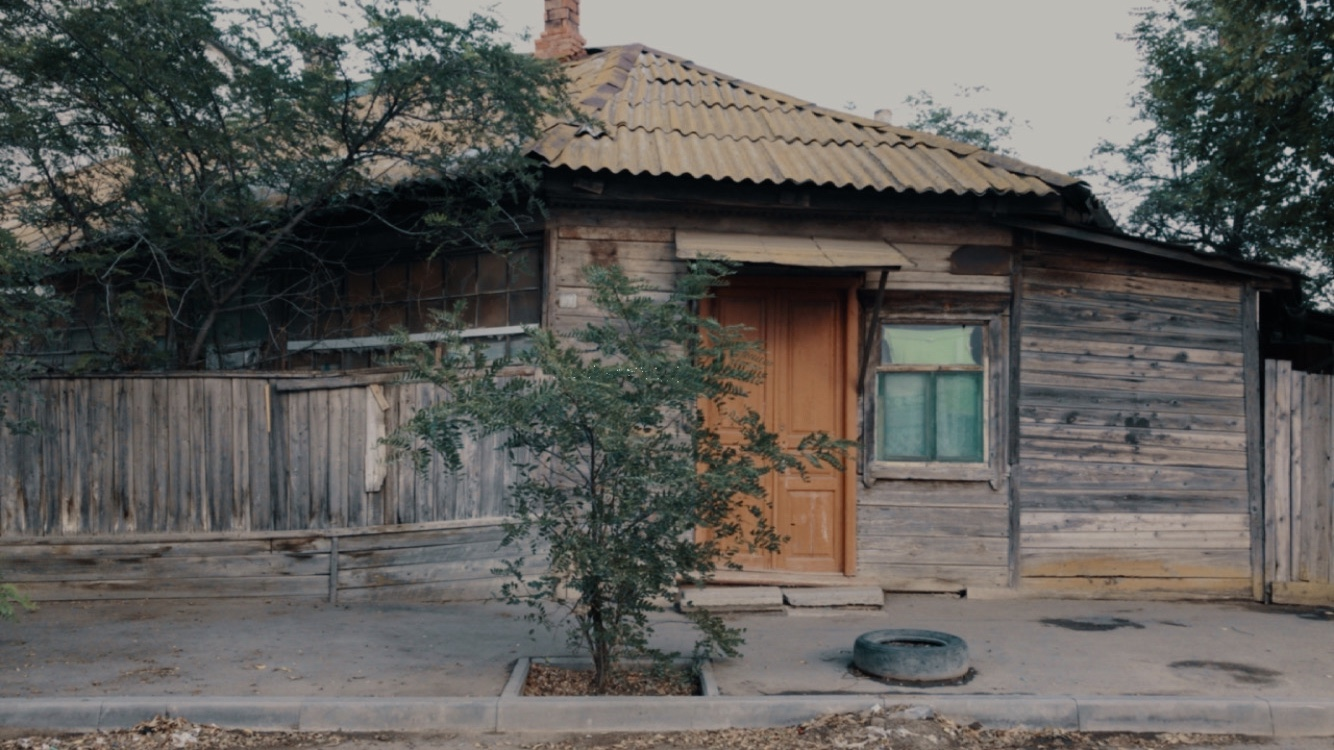
- Building at the intersection of Red Embankment and Tsiolkovsky Street in Yamgurchev
- Coordinates: 46°20′30″N 48°03′25″E
- Country: Russia
- Federal subject: Astrakhan Oblast
- City: Astrakhan
- City district: Kirovsky
- Postal code(s): 414004

Yamgurchev (Russian: Ямгурчев) is a neighborhood and historic district in Astrakhan, Russia. It is located southeast of the city center, across the river Kutum from the Bolshiye Isady bazaar.

== History ==
According to the 18th-century historian Vasily Tatishchev, the name of the neighborhood comes from Yamgurchi Khan, the second-to-last ruler of the Astrakhan Khanate before it was conquered and annexed by Muscovy. Other historic names of the area include the Russified versions Ogurcheyeva Sloboda and Yemgurcheyeva Sloboda.

Most buildings in today's Yamgurchev are single and two-storey family homes built of wood in the late 19th and early 20th centuries. Although some of them are registered heritage sites, they are largely run-down and sometimes abandoned. Yamgurchev is home to a weekly flea market known as Vesyolaya Slobodka ("Jolly Quarter").
