= Agrizhan =

Ethnic group

The Agrizhan (Russian: Агрыжанские татары Agryzhanskie tatary) are primarily Muslim descendants of Tatar women and Indian merchants who operated in Astrakhan. The children of these Indo-Tatar unions were known as Agrizhan Tatars.

== History ==
The community's decline began in the early 19th century, when the Russian Empire imposed strict regulations on foreign trade. By 1857, their population had dwindled to 107, and they eventually assimilated into the broader Astrakhan Tatar population.

Some of the earliest Indian merchants were Hindus, closely linked to Bukharan merchants in Astrakhan. They were part of a vibrant trade network that connected Astrakhan with Bukhara and Iran, both before and after the Russian conquest of the city. Over time, these merchants converted to Islam. Like the Gilani Tatars and the Bukharan Tatars, they retained special privileges until 1836

Between 1860 and 1914, some Agrizhan Tatars migrated to the Ottoman Empire alongside other Muslim groups from Russia.
