= Maksim Gleykin =

Russian footballer

Personal information
- Full name: Maksim Nikolayevich Gleykin
- Date of birth: 9 May 1985 (age 41)
- Place of birth: Astrakhan, Russian SFSR
- Height: 1.80 m (5 ft 11 in)
- Position: Goalkeeper

Youth career
- FC Volgar Astrakhan

Senior career*
Years	Team	Apps	(Gls)
2003	FC Volgar-Gazprom-2 Astrakhan (amateur)		
2004	FC Sudostroitel Astrakhan	3	(0)
2005	FC Volgar-Gazprom-2 Astrakhan (amateur)		
2006	FC Volgar-Gazprom Astrakhan	1	(0)
2007	FC Volgar-Gazprom-2 Astrakhan (amateur)		
2008	FC Fakel-StroyArt Voronezh (amateur)		
2009	FC FSA Voronezh	14	(0)
2010	FC Raspadskaya Mezhdurechensk (amateur)		
2011–2012	FC Yakutiya Yakutsk	23	(0)
2012–2013	FC Dynamo Biysk		
2013	FC Titan Klin		
2015–2019	FC CFKiS Lobnya (amateur)		
- * Club domestic league appearances and goals

Maksim Nikolayevich Gleykin (Russian: Максим Николаевич Глейкин; born 9 May 1985) is a Russian former professional football player.

== Club career ==
He played in the Russian Football National League for FC Volgar-Gazprom Astrakhan in 2006.
