= Bolshiye Isady =

Bolshiye Isady Большие Исады
- Neighborhood of Astrakhan
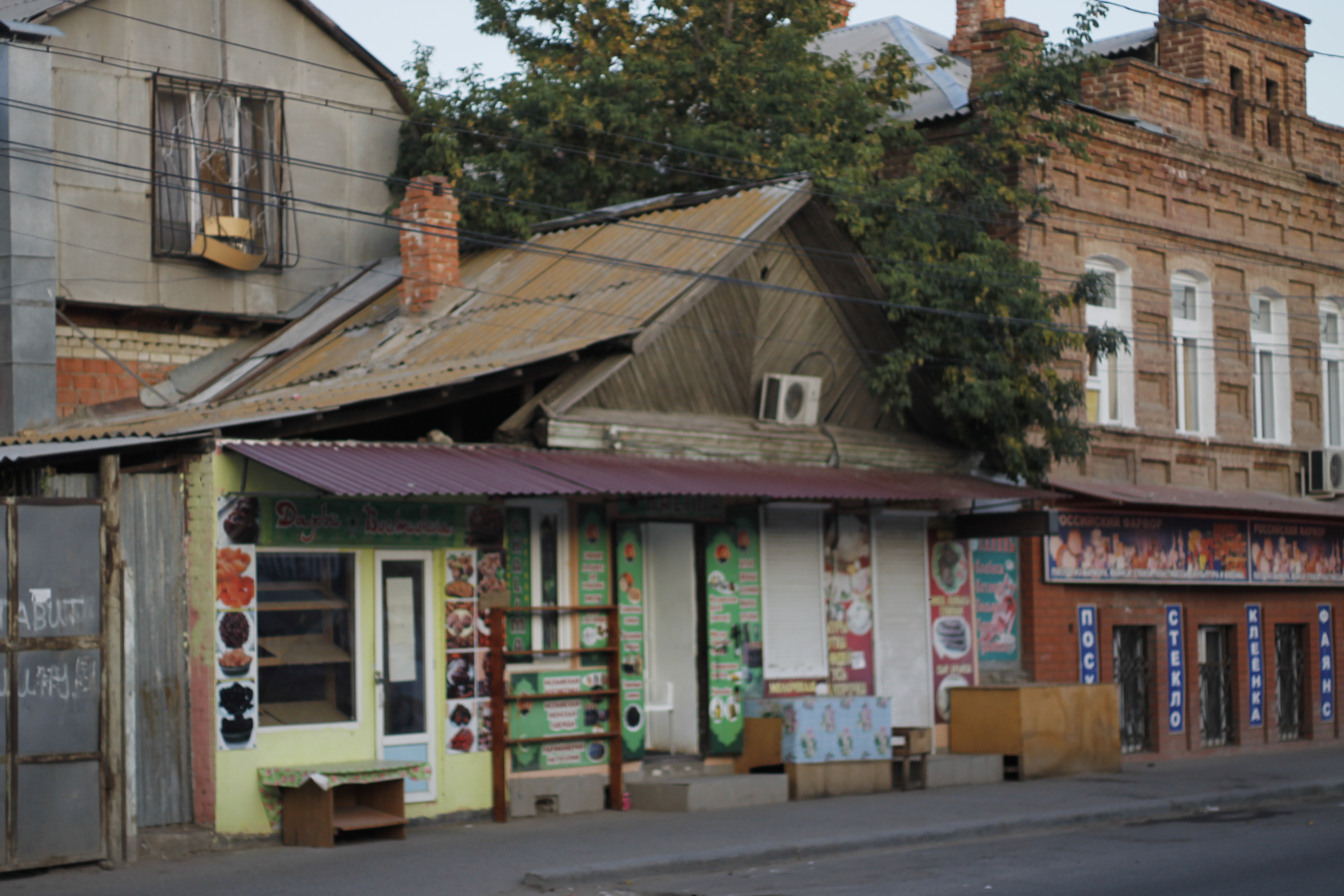
- Small shops on Sverdlov Street in Bolshiye Isady
- Coordinates: 46°20′46″N 48°03′11″E
- Country: Russia
- Federal subject: Astrakhan Oblast
- City: Astrakhan
- City district: Kirovsky
- Postal code(s): 414000

Bolshie Isady (Russian: Большие Исады) is a neighborhood, historic district and bazaar in Astrakhan, Russia. It is located in the eastern end of the island created by the rivers Volga and Kutum and the Varvakis Canal, northwest of Yamgurchev.

== History ==
There has been a large market in the area since the 15th or 16th century, and this is where the name of the area comes from. The word isady, meaning "bazaar" or "market" in the local dialect, comes from the archaic verb issazhivatsya "to disembark [from boat or ship]". The descriptor bolshiye means "big", hinting at the fact that Bolshiye Isady is the largest of Astrakhan's numerous historic riverside markets.

Today Bolshiye Isady is home to a growing population of Dagestanis and Central Asian immigrants. A large mosque in the area, historically known as the Tatar Mosque, is more commonly called the Caucasian Mosque because it is mostly frequented by people from the North Caucasus.
