= Astrakhan Tatars =

Subgroup of the Volga Tatars

Total population
- 60,000

Regions with significant populations
- Russia: 30,000–60,000

Languages
- Tatar, Nogai, Russian

Religion
- Sunni Islam

Related ethnic groups
- Tatars

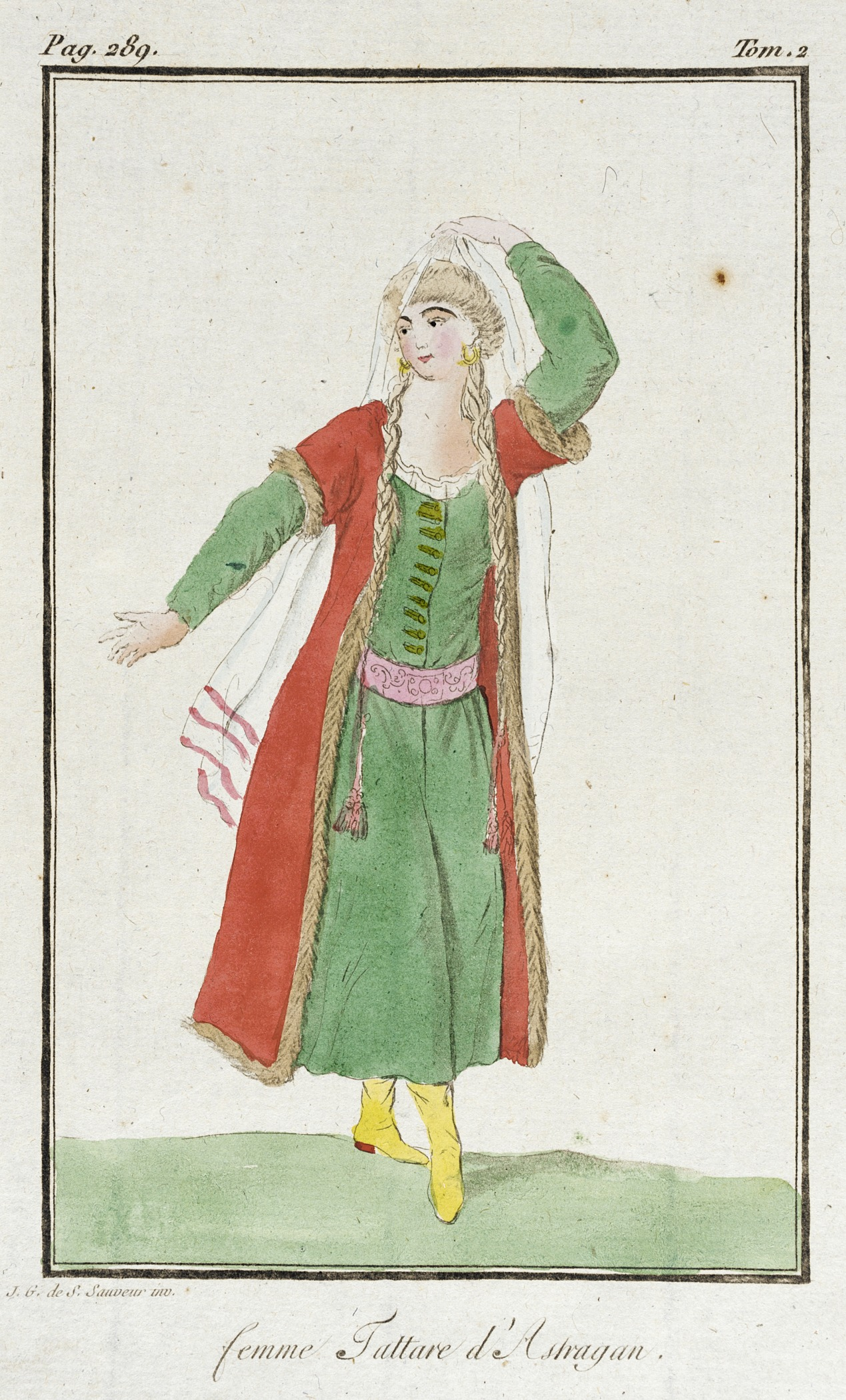

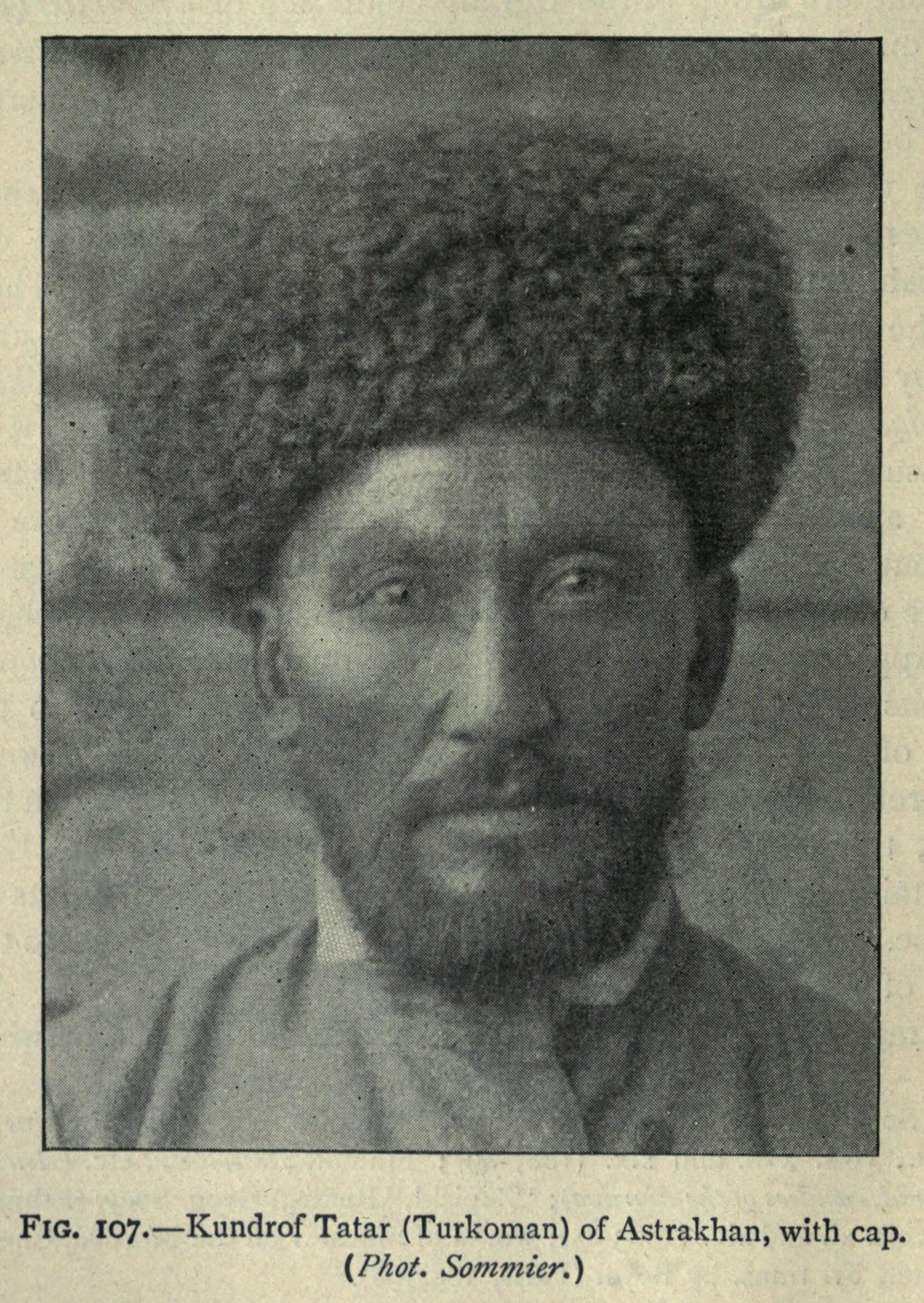

Astrakhan Tatars (Tatar: Əsterxan tatarları, Əsterhan tatarlary, Ashtarkhan tatarları; Russian: Астраханские Татары) are an ethnic subgroup of the Tatars.

In the 15th to 17th-centuries, the Astrakhan Tatars inhabited the Astrakhan Khanate (1459–1556), which was also inhabited by the Nogai Horde, and the Astrakhan Tatars exerted a profound effect on Nogais. Since the 17th century, there has been an increased interaction and ethnic mixing of the Astrakhan Tatars with Volga Tatars.

== Population ==
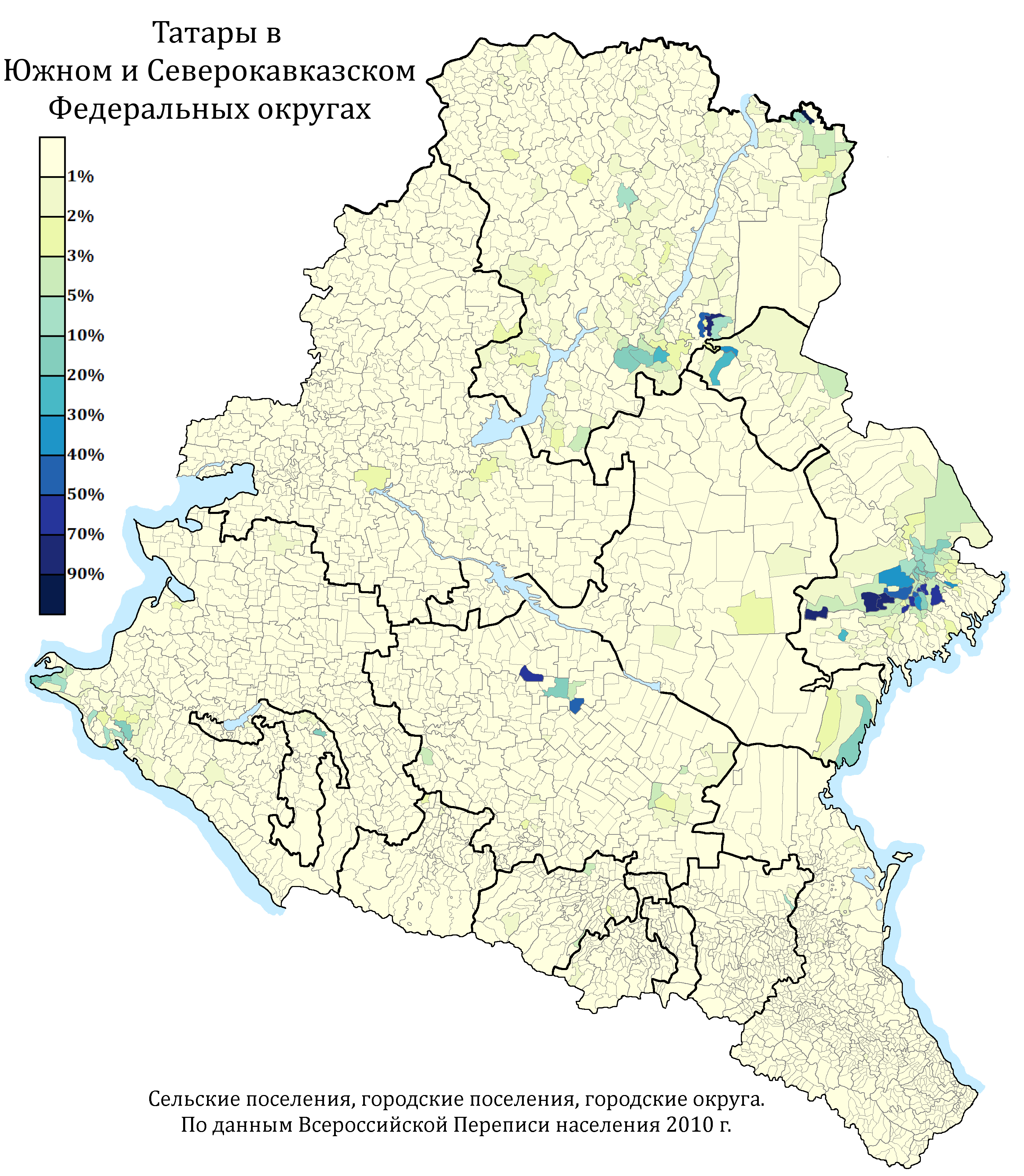
The distribution of Tatars in the Southern and North Caucasian Federal District by urban and rural settlements in %, 2010 census

The Astrakhan Tatars (around 60,000) are a group of Tatars, descendants of the Astrakhan Khanate's nomadic population, who live mostly in Astrakhan Oblast. For the Russian Census in 2010, most Astrakhan Tatars declared themselves simply as Tatars and few declared themselves as Astrakhan Tatars. A large number of Volga Tatars live in Astrakhan Oblast and differences between them have been disappearing.

According to the Encyclopædia Britannica Eleventh Edition, writing in 1911, "The Astrakhan Tatars (about 10,000) are, with the Mongol Kalmucks, all that now remains of the once so powerful Astrakhan empire. They also are agriculturists and gardeners..."

While Astrakhan (Ästerxan) Tatar is a mixed dialect, around 43,000 have assimilated to the Middle (i.e., Kazan) dialect. Their ancestors are Kipchaks, Khazars, and some Volga Bulgars. (Volga Bulgars had trade colonies in modern Astrakhan and Volgograd oblasts of Russia.)

The Astrakhan Tatars also assimilated the Agrzhan.

The Astrakhan Tatars are further divided into the Kundrov, Yurt, and Karagash. The latter are also at times called the Karashi Tatars.

== Notable Astrakhan Tatars ==
- Alex Battler – Russian-Canadian scholar and political writer. (Tatar father)
- Rinat Dasayev – Russian football coach and a former Soviet goalkeeper
- Renat Davletyarov - Russian film director, film producer and screenwriter (Tatar father)
- Marziyya Davudova – Russian-born Soviet Azerbaijani actress

== Sources ==
- DM Iskhakov. Астраханские татары: этническое расселение и динамика численности в XVIII – начале XX вв. (The Astrakhan Tatars: Ethnic Settlement and Population Dynamics from the 18th to Beginning of the 20th Century). Kazan, 1992. - pp. 5–33.
- The Tartars. The people of Russia. Encyclopedia. - Moscow, 1994. - pp. 320–321.
