= Astrakhan Kremlin =

Fortress in Astrakhan, Russia

- Астраханский Кремль (Russian)
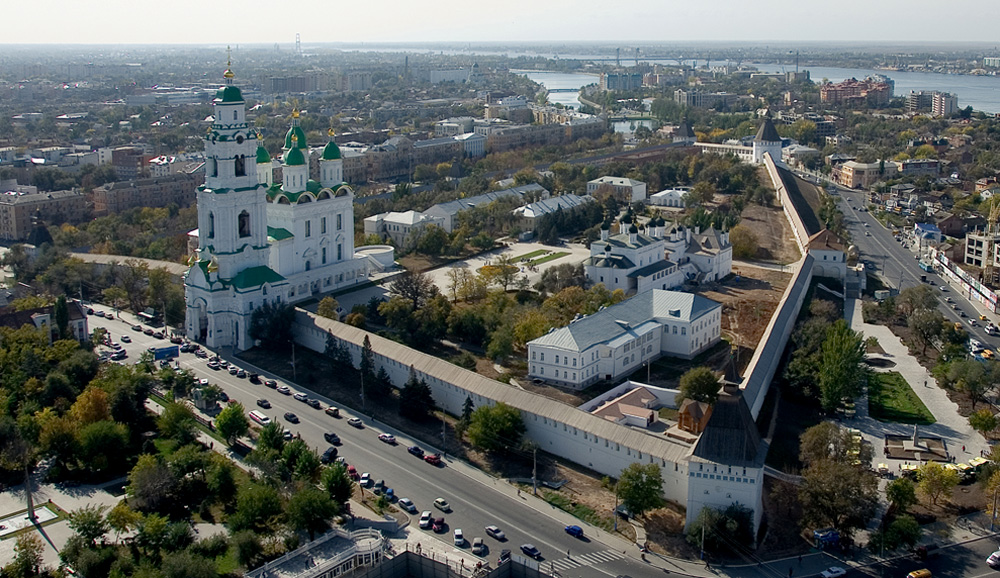
- Interactive map of Astrakhan Kremlin
- 46.3494°N 48.0322°E
- Location: Astrakhan, Russia

History
- Built: 1562—1581

Site notes
- Height: Archbishop Tower (min. height): 12.5 m (41 ft); Prechistinsky Gate (max. height): 84.8 m (278 ft); Avg. height of walls from 7 m (23 ft) to 11.3 m (37 ft)
- Area: 11 ha (0.11 km^{2})

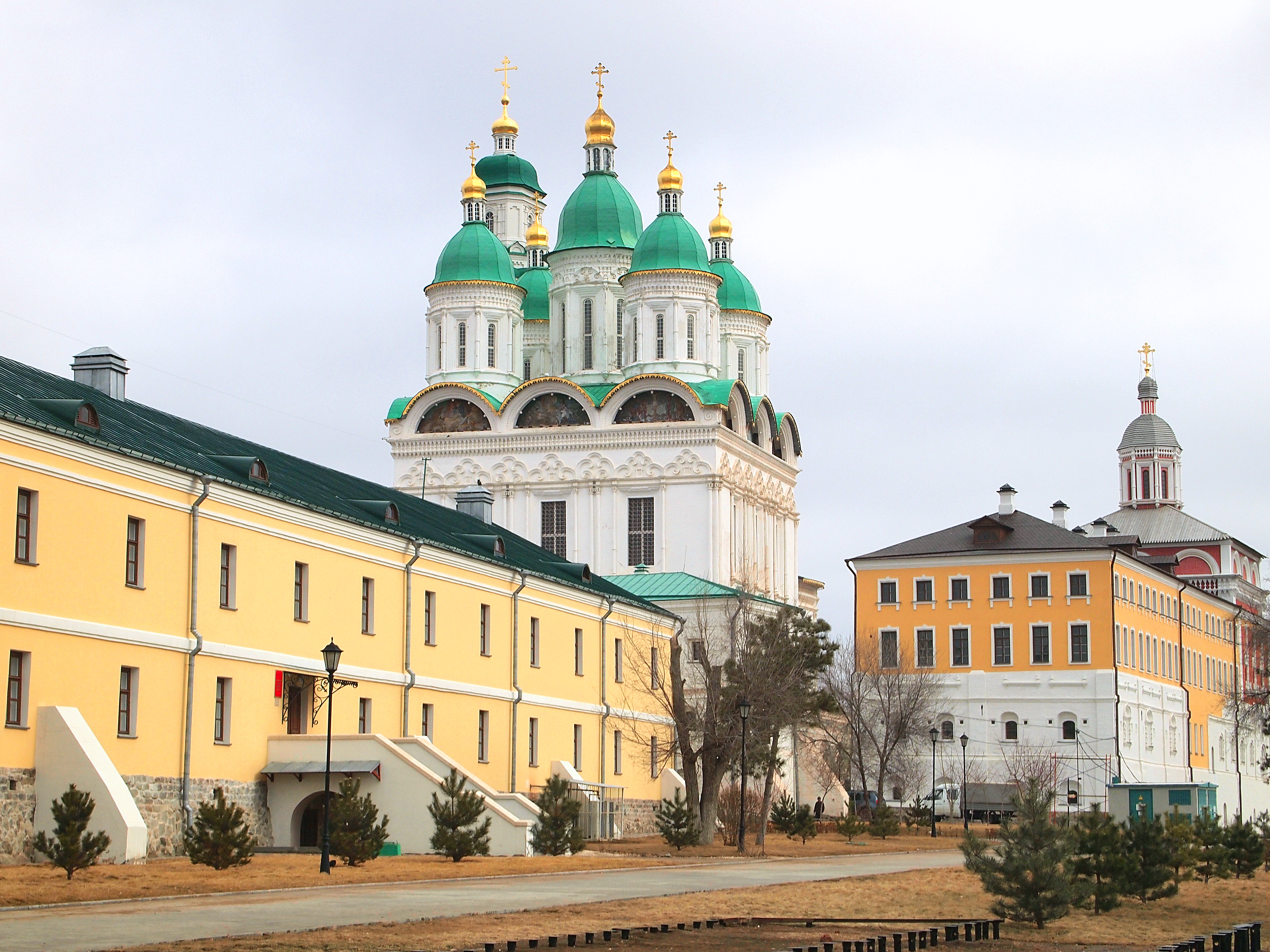
The Maria Ascension cathedral in Astrakhan.

Astrakhan Kremlin (Russian: Астраханский кремль, romanized: Astrakhanskiy kreml) is a fortress in Astrakhan, Russia. It is located on a hill on an island in the Volga Delta, between the Volga, the Kutum, and the Tsarev.

== About ==
For centuries, the Astrakhan Kremlin was an inapproachable stronghold on the south-eastern border of Russia. A series of historical events are related to the fortress: the Crimean Turkish hiking on the lower Volga in the 16th century, the Time of Troubles in Russia and the peasant uprising led by Stenka Razin in the 17th century, the transformation during the reign of Tsar Peter the Great, revolt of archers in 1705–1706, development of the Caspian navy in the 18th century, the reinforcement of the country's borders and entry into a part of Russian territories of the Caucasus and Central Asia.

In 1552, Tsar Ivan IV conquered the Kazan Khanate. Four years later, Russian troops took Astrakhan. With the incorporation of the Middle and Lower Volga regions, the Moscow state gained access to the Caspian Sea.

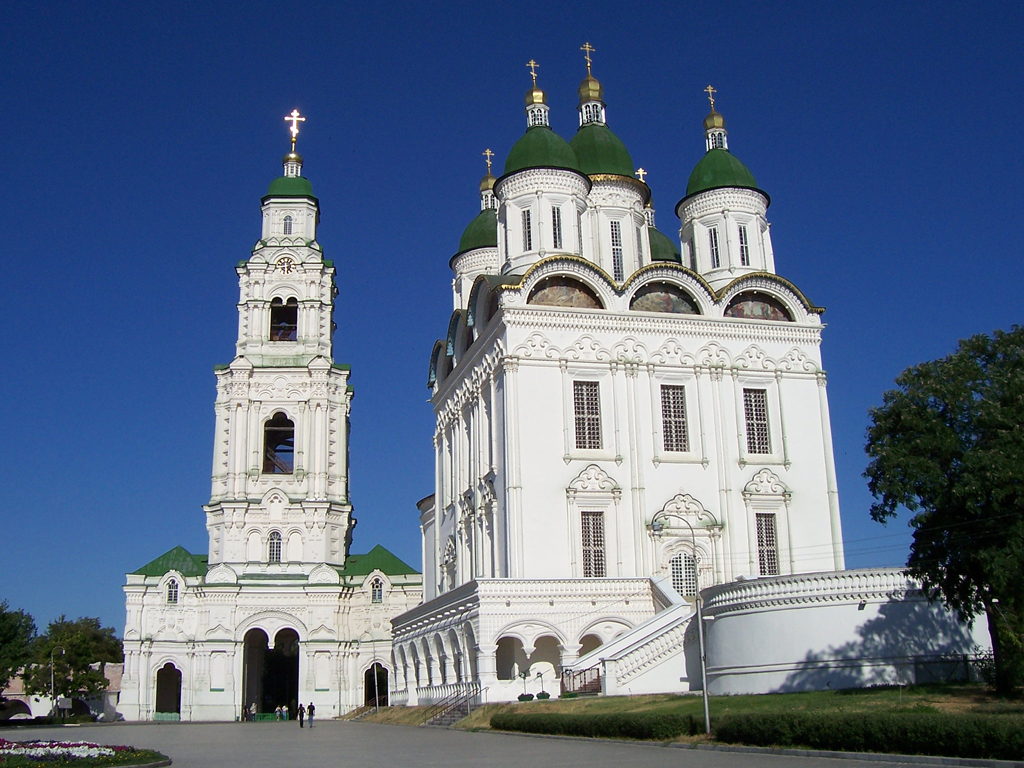
Astrakhan Uspenskii sobor of kreml

The first construction of the Kremlin began in 1587–1588 under the guidance of I.G. Vorodkov, a sapper and a lector of Discharge Order. He laid the first wooden fortress with powerful solid walls and towers. The construction site was chosen on the highest hill, known as “Rabbit” or “Zayachii” in Russian. It was the ideal location for a fortress, as the hill is surrounded by the Volga River to the west and north, and by lakes and marshes to the south and east.

During the reign of Tsar Ivan IV and Boris Godunov, the wooden fortress was rebuilt into a stone one. To construct the Kremlin walls and towers, state-appointed master builders were sent from Moscow to Astrakhan. The chiefs responsible for the construction and planning of the stone fortress were Mikhail Ivanovich Veliyaminov, Grigorii Ovcin and lecturer Dei Gubastii. To achieve the best results, they used old but very strong Tatar plinths, brought from the ruins of Golden Horde cities. The stone citadel was built in the style of the Moscow Kremlin.

== History ==
=== Construction and early history ===
The walls of the Astrakhan Kremlin were equipped with prongs the slots of which allowed to fire from handguns against enemies. At the top tier, there were machicolations (Russian: варницы) —holes through which boiled water or hot tar could be poured on attackers. At that time, the fortress's fire-fighting system was considered one of the most modern in all of Russia.

The construction of Assumption Cathedral, which began on October 1, 1699, was likely the most significant event that was held on the territory of the Astrakhan Kremlin. Thirty professional stonemasons, led by bondman architect Dorotheos Myakisheva, were invited to undertake the project. The construction of the Cathedral lasted almost 12 years. During this time, the architects created a temple with a proper cubic form and five domes. The exterior of the cathedral was decorated with molded brick and carved white stone. Windows and dome heads were framed by columns in the Corinthian style, and semicircular arches were filled with paintings depicting biblical scenes. Three such arches were arranged on each side of the temple.

The cathedral was divided into two floors. The upper church, dedicated to the Dormition of the Mother of God, is a tall and light-filled temple intended for ceremonial worship during the warm months. The lower church is dimly lit and surrounded by the gallery columns.

In 1710, the bell tower cathedral was constructed under the control of architect Dorothea Myakisheva. In addition to bells, the watch was also installed, which created freshness and uniqueness in the city. The next two centuries were relatively calm for the Kremlin. Its buildings were repaired, rebuilt and renewed.

=== Twentieth century ===
At the beginning of the 20th century, after the October Revolution, access to the Kremlin's territory was closed. It was transformed into a military post, where groups of Red Guards were formed, and the Military Revolutionary Committee was established.

In January 1918, Astrakhan Kremlin was once again at the center of fateful events, when supporters of Soviet power fought with Astrakhan Cossacks. The Cossacks attacked The Red Army, entrenched in the Kremlin, from the roofs of nearby buildings. During the battle, the Kremlin suffered serious destruction. Miraculously the temples within Kremlin have survived. In 1919, the Red Army was reorganized under the leadership of Sergei Kirov to protect the Volga's outfall and to defeat the White Guard troops and foreign interventionists. Thus, in the early 20th century the Kremlin retained its military significance and was popularly named as “The Town of Trotsky” (in 1992–1926). Only after the end of World War II was access to the Kremlin reopened. At the same time, the Kremlin ceased to serve military purposes. In the mid-20th century, significant restoration works were undertaken, saving many buildings that required urgent repairs.

=== Museum ===
In 1974, the Astrakhan Kremlin became a museum, and in 1980, it became part of the Astrakhan State United Historical-Architectural Museum-Reserve. Today, citizens and tourists of Astrakhan can access museum exhibits showcasing the lifestyle of the Astrakhan Garrison. Visitors can see Casual Suits archers and scorers, elements of their weapons and ammunition, and an exhibition dedicated to the history of popular uprisings and corporal punishment. In 2011, after the restoration of the Kremlin, the Guardhouse exposition was opened, providing insights into the life of the Astrakhan military garrison in the 19th century.

== Plan ==
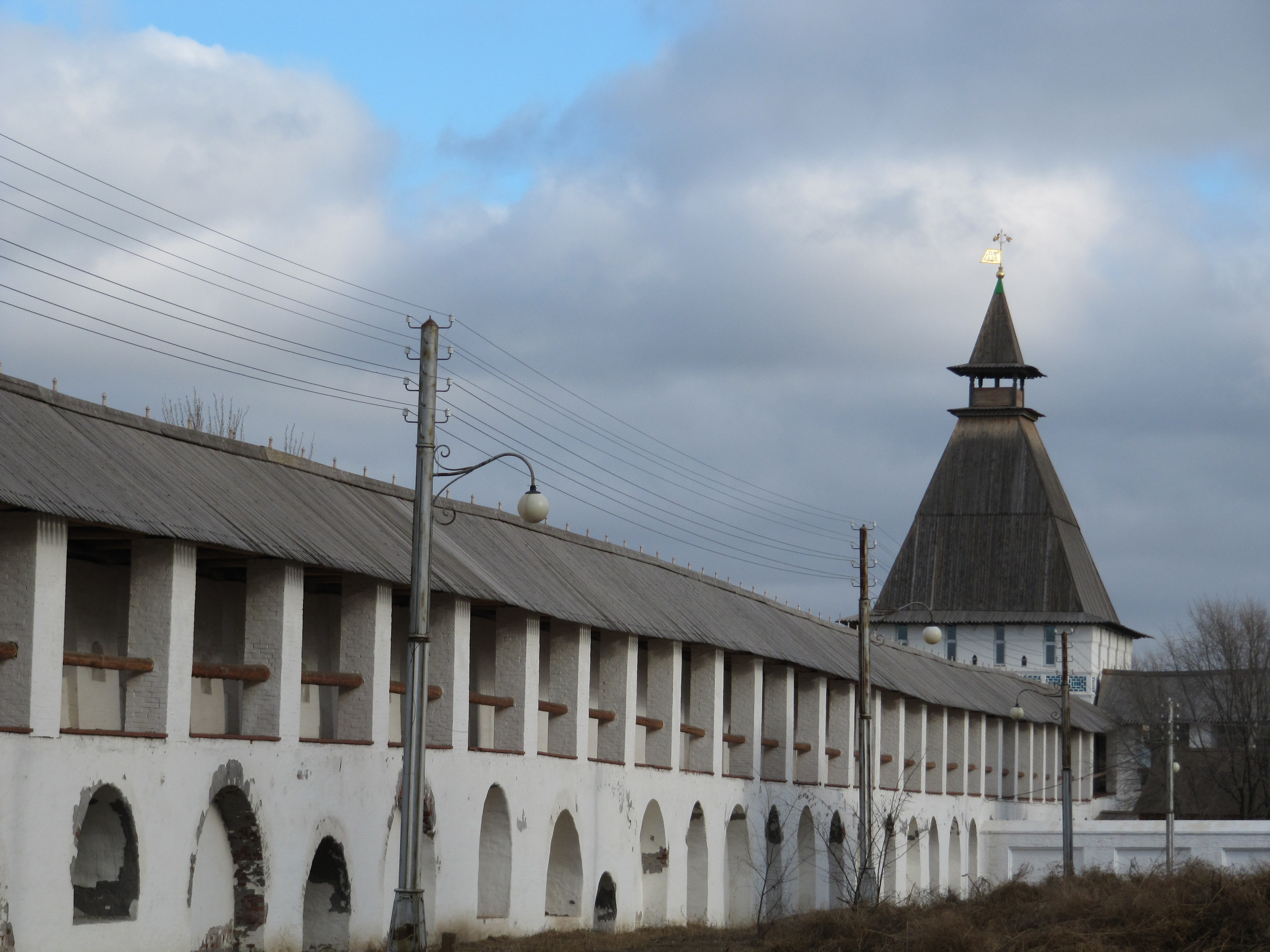
Walls and towers

- Walls of Kremlin, 1582–1589
- The cathedral bell tower with Prechistinsky Gate (Пречистенские ворота), 1910–1912
- Archbishop Tower (Архиерейская башня), 1812–1813
- Zhitnyaya Tower (Житная Башня), 1582–1589
- Crimean Tower (Крымская Башня), 1582–1589
- 'Red Gate' Tower (Башня «Красные Ворота»)
- Water Gate (Ворота Водяные)
- St. Nicholas Church Gate (Никольская Надвратная Церковь), 1729–1738
- Artillery Tower and Yard (now it is museum with the same name), 1582–1589
- Cathedral of the Assumption, 1698–1710
- Trinity Cathedral with the churches of the Presentation of the Lord and the Introduction in Virgin Mary Church, House of Holy Trinity Monastery, 1602–1605
- Cyril's Chapel (Кирилловская часовня), 1677
- Archbishop's (Metropolitan's) House and the Church of Savior
- House of Clergy, 1622–1624
- Place of execution, 1710–1711
- Officer's houses, 1805
- Soldier's Barracks, 1805
- Administrative housing (now it is a museum of the culture and life of the peoples of the Astrakhan region from the 18th to the 20th centuries.)
