= Erkin Mademilova =

Kyrgyz ballet dancer (1929–2018)

Kulbubu (Erkin) Chortonovna Mademilova (27 February 1929 - 27 July 2018) was a Kyrgyz ballet dancer and soloist of the Kyrgyz Opera and Ballet Theater (1947-1953). People's Artist of the Kirghiz SSR (1979).

== Early life and education ==
Kulbubu Mademilova was born on 27 February 1929 in Frunze, Kirghiz Autonomous Socialist Soviet Republic. Her father was Chorton Bekbulatov, the head of the printing house. Mother - Kalbubu Mademilova, an artist of the Kyrgyz Theater Studio.

From 1937 to 1941, Mademilova studied at the Leningrad State Choreographic Institute. After the start of World War II, she returned to Frunze and studied at the choreographic studio.

== Career ==
From 1947 to 1953, Mademilova was a soloist at the Kirghiz Opera and Ballet Theater. She took the stage name Erkin to avoid being confused with her mother. Mademilova performed leading solo parts in performances of Swan Lake, Raymonda, Laurencia, The Fountain of Bakhchisarai, Coppelia, Cholpon, Anar, and others.

From 1953 to 1958, Mademilova was a student at Lunacharsky State Institute for Theatre Arts (GITIS), majoring in "director-choreographer" (class of the laureate of the Stalin Prizes, People's Artist of the USSR, Academician Rostislav Zakharov).

In 1958, Mademilova was awarded the Order of the Badge of Honor as the chief choreographer of the cultural program "Blossom, Our Youth!" at the VI World Festival of Youth and Students in Moscow, awarding the First Prize.

Since 1959 Mademilova has been the chief ballet master of the Kirghiz Opera and Ballet Theater. She staged the ballets Giselle, Grand Waltz, Egyptian Nights, and productions of Francesca da Rimini, Spanish Capriccio, and others.

From 1966 to 1969, Mademilova interned at the Stanislavski and Nemirovich-Danchenko Moscow Academic Music Theatre and the Bolshoi Theater of the USSR.

Since 1969 Mademilova has been the chief choreographer of the Kirghiz Opera and Ballet Theater. She staged the ballets Giselle, The Path of Thunder, The Grand Waltz, Laurencia, The Fountain of Bakhchisarai, Egyptian Nights, and others.

In 1970, Mademilova was sent to Mongolia as a choreographer of the Song and Dance Ensemble of the Mongolian People's Republic and director of the anniversary program dedicated to the 50th anniversary of the republic's founding. From 1974 to 1976, she created dance groups as a choreographer and teacher in Vietnam.

From 1977 to 1987, Mademilova was an artistic director of the Kirghiz State Dance Ensemble. In 1981, she created the Issyk-Kul Song and Dance Ensemble "Boz Salkyn".

Since 1993 Mademilova has been a professor at the Department of Solo Singing at the Kyrgyz National Conservatory. In 1997 she founded the Department of Directing Choreography and was its first head. Since 2002 she was a professor.

Mademilova died on 27 July 2018.

== Personal life ==
Husband: Asankhan Dzhumakhmatovich Dzhumakhmatov, a conductor, People's Artist of the USSR.

Children:

- Zarema Nurdinovna Mademilova, an actress, director, cinematographer, screenwriter, and public figure.
- Erkin Asankhanovich Dzhumakhmatov, a creative worker.
- Lolita Baktybekovna Mademilova, a film director.

== Awards ==
- 1958 - Order of the Badge of Honor
- 1963 - Honored Worker of Culture of the Kirghiz SSR.
- 1979 - People's Artist of the Kirghiz SSR.
