= Sergei Yakushev =

- Born: September 25, 1910; Astrakhan, Astrakhan Governorate, Russian Empire
- Died: April 30, 1995 (aged 84); Baku, Azerbaijan
- Citizenship: Russian empire USSR; Azerbaijan
- Occupation: Theatre actor
- Awards: People's Artist of the Azerbaijan SSR Order of the Red Banner of Labour Order of the Badge of Honour

Sergei Ilyich Yakushev (Russian: Серге́й Ильи́ч Я́кушев, September 25, 1910 – April 30, 1995) was a Soviet and Azerbaijani actor and Deputy of the 6th–8th convocation of the Supreme Soviet of the Azerbaijan SSR.

== Biography ==
Sergei Yakushev was born on September 25, 1910, in Astrakhan. He began his stage career in 1931 at the Lensovet Theatre and graduated in 1933 from the State Institute of Theatre Arts (GITIS) in Moscow.

He served in the Soviet Army from 1934 to 1935. From 1936 to 1948 he worked in the Leningrad, Stalinabad and Irkutsk theaters. From 1948 he worked as an actor at the Azerbaijan State Russian Drama Theater, from 1959 to 1968 as a director, and from 1968 as an actor again.

Sergei Yakushev had been a member of the CPSU since 1942, a deputy of the Supreme Soviet of the Azerbaijan SSR of the 6th–8th convocation, as well as a member of the Commission on Public Education, Science and Culture.

He died on April 30, 1995, in Baku.

== Awards ==
- People's Artist of the Azerbaijan SSR – June 10, 1959
- People's Artist of the Tajik SSR – April 28, 1945
- Honored Artist of the Tajik SSR – 1939
- Order of the Red Banner of Labour — 1970
- Order of Friendship of Peoples — September 24, 1980
- Order of the Badge of Honour — 1941
