= Solyanka, Narimanovsky District, Astrakhan Oblast =

Solyanka Солянка
- Selo
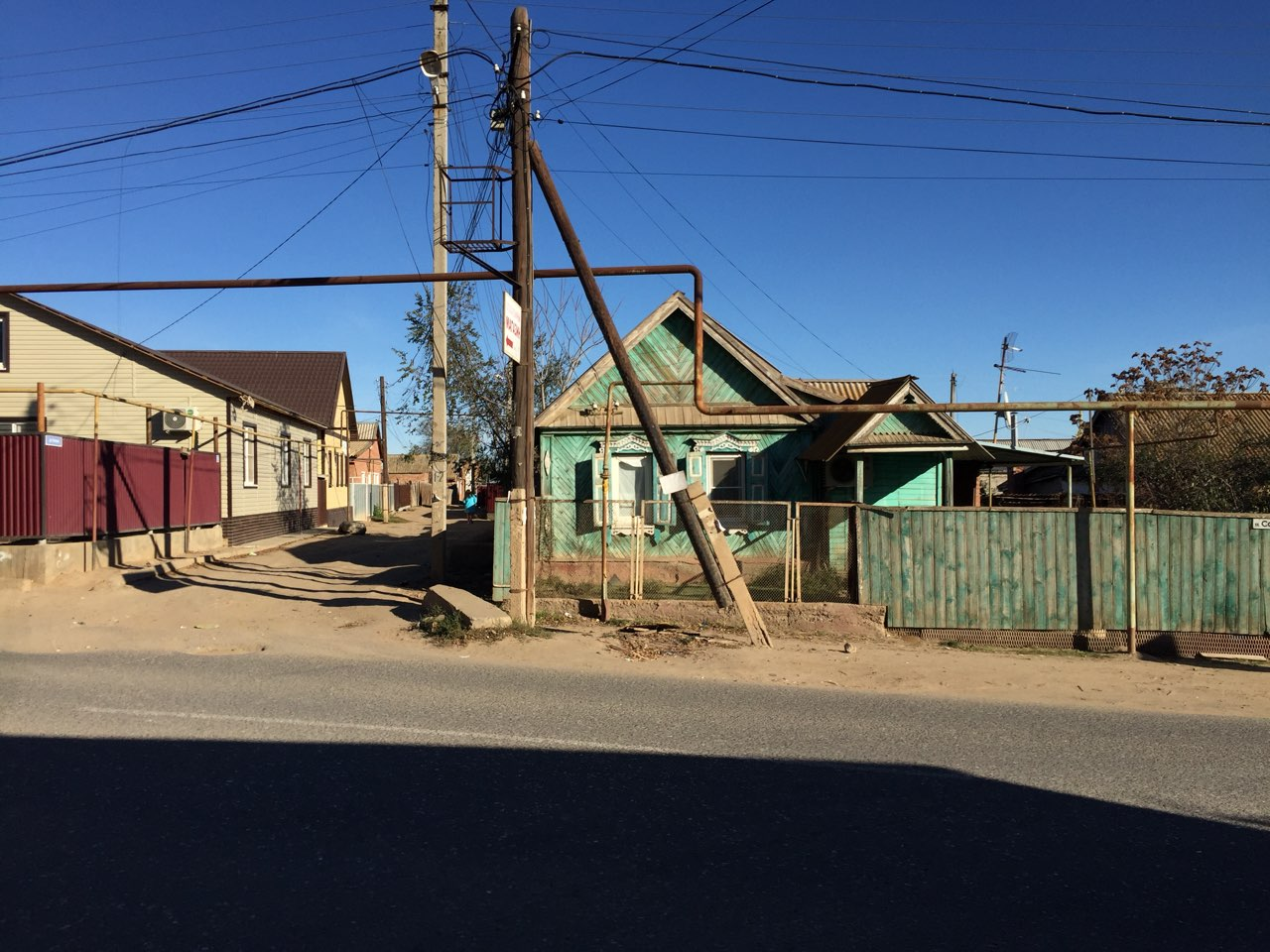

- Location within Astrakhan Oblast Location within Russia
- Coordinates: 46°23′N 48°00′E
- Country: Russia
- Region: Astrakhan Oblast
- District: Narimanovsky District
- Time zone: UTC+4:00

Solyanka (Russian: Солянка) is a rural locality (a selo) and the administrative center of Solyansky Selsoviet, Narimanovsky District, Astrakhan Oblast, Russia. The population was 3,738 as of 2010. There are 124 streets.

== Geography ==
It is located on the Volga River, 37 km south of Narimanov (the district's administrative centre) by road. Solyanka is the nearest rural locality.
