= Starokucherganovka =

Starokucherganovka Старокучергановка
- Selo
- Location within Astrakhan Oblast Location within Russia
- Coordinates: 46°19′N 47°57′E
- Country: Russia
- Region: Astrakhan Oblast
- District: Narimanovsky District
- Time zone: UTC+4:00

Starokucherganovka (Russian: Старокучергановка, Tatar: Qañga) is a rural locality (a selo) and the administrative center of Starokucherganovsky Selsoviet, Narimanovsky District, Astrakhan Oblast, Russia. The population was 6,042 as of 2010. There are 91 streets.

== Geography ==
Starokucherganovka is located 47 km south of Narimanov (the district's administrative centre) by road. Bishtyubinka is the nearest rural locality.
