= Igor Korošec =

Igor Korošec (pronounced ['egor ko'roshez]) is a Slovenian-Russian actor.

== Early life ==
He was born in the Slovenian town of Kranj. His first performance was in pre-school at age six. Five years later, he decided to visit a semi-professional theatre and audition. After a couple of months he started rehearsing the role of Rozle in "Dobra volja je najbolja." In high school, while performing in drama class, he realized that he wanted to move further, and established the theatrical group Izza Kulis (From Behind The Set). He produced and acted in all performances and directed Neil Simon's Barefoot in the Park. After high school Igor continued his career professionally. Introduced to Stanislavski's 'system', he traveled to Moscow to study at the Russian Academy of Dramatic Arts, where, in 1996, he graduated summa cum laude.

== Career ==
In 1993 Korošec worked with blind and vision impaired people, attracted sponsors, and organized the first Slovenian Acting Seminar for Blind and Vision Impaired. He directed Tennessee Williams' Glass Menagerie. The seminar launched careers for Slovenian vision impaired actors. After graduation Igor returned to Slovenia and accepted an employment offer from the Slovenian National Theater, Celje. He acted with the company for two years and continued to direct and teach. In 1998 he began traveling between Europe and the US in order to direct, act and teach.

From 2003 to 2012, he made guest appearances on Television shows, including Rizzoli and Isles, The Unit, and Alias.

== Awards ==
- Best Story Telling in City of Moscow - Best Story Teller & Performer, 1995—For a solo-performance of Anton Chekhov's short story The Good German".
- Visocky Award - Best Story Teller/Actor, 1995—For a solo-performance of Anton Chekhov's short story The Good German".
- Festival of Story Telling Best Story Teller/Actor, 1995—For a solo-performance of Anton Chekhov's short story The Good German".
- 1st Slovenian Acting Seminar for Blind & Vision Impaired People - Award for Innovative Contribution to Slovenian Blind & Vision Impaired Community, 1993
- The Actors Fund Awards: Encore Award, 2010—For extraordinary dedication and commitment to the performing arts by supporting the individuals (David Steinberg mostly recognized as Megosh in The Willow) who bring spectacular performances to the US.

== Sources ==
- IMDb details
