= Astrakhan =

Administrative centre of Astrakhan Oblast, Russia

Astrakhan Астрахань
- City
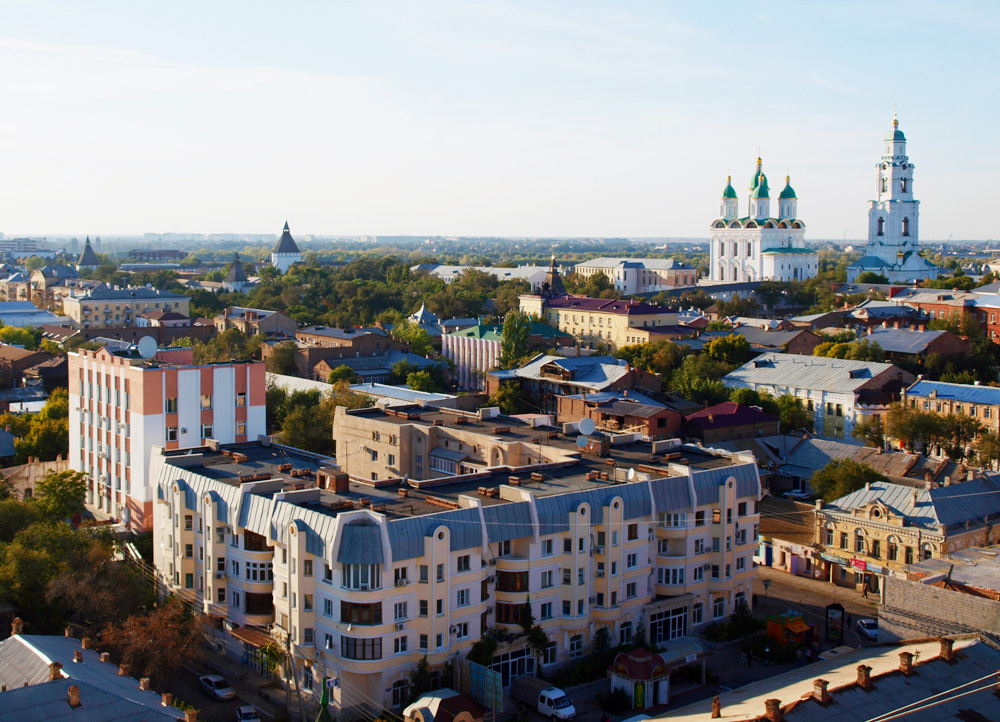
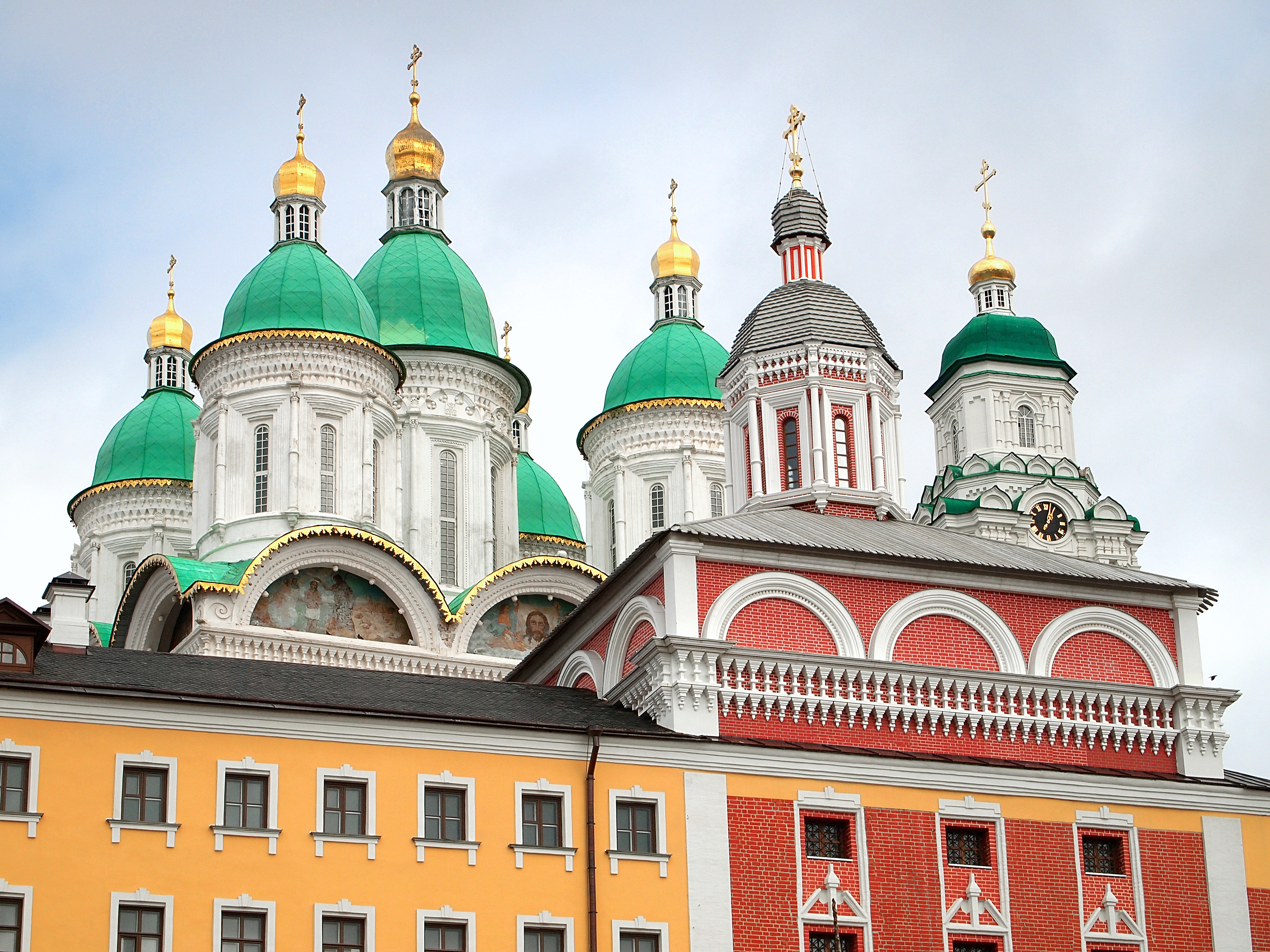
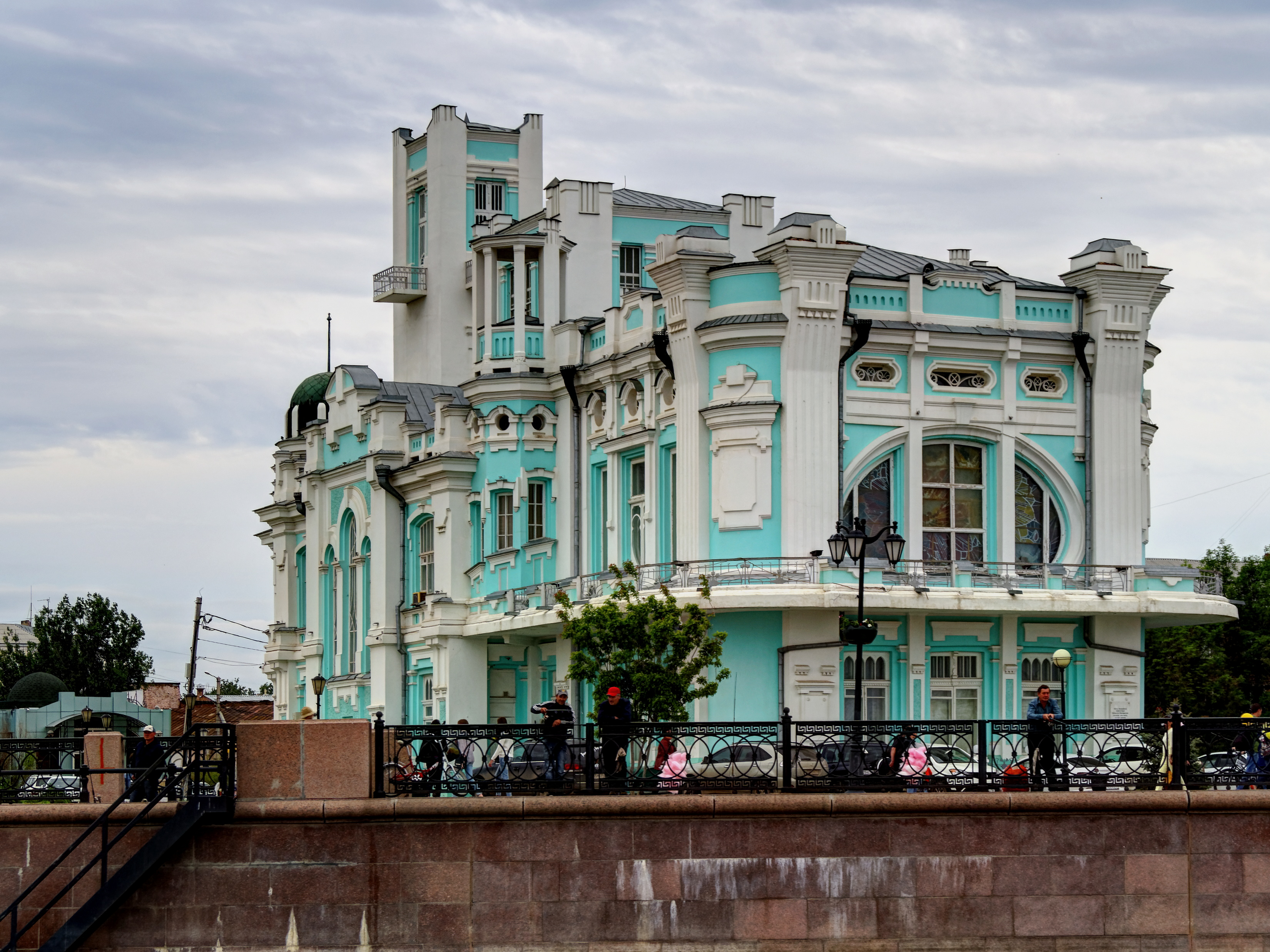
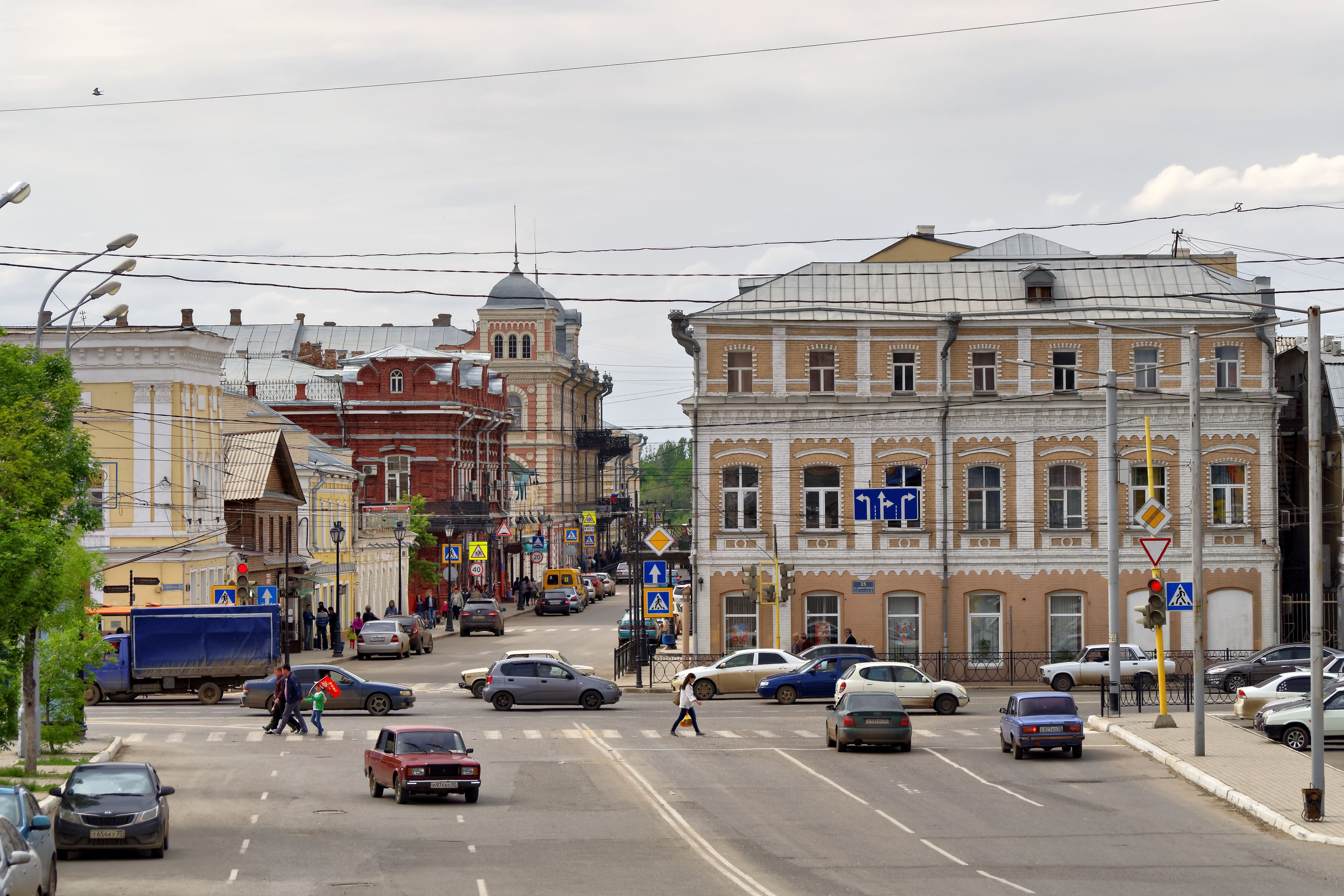
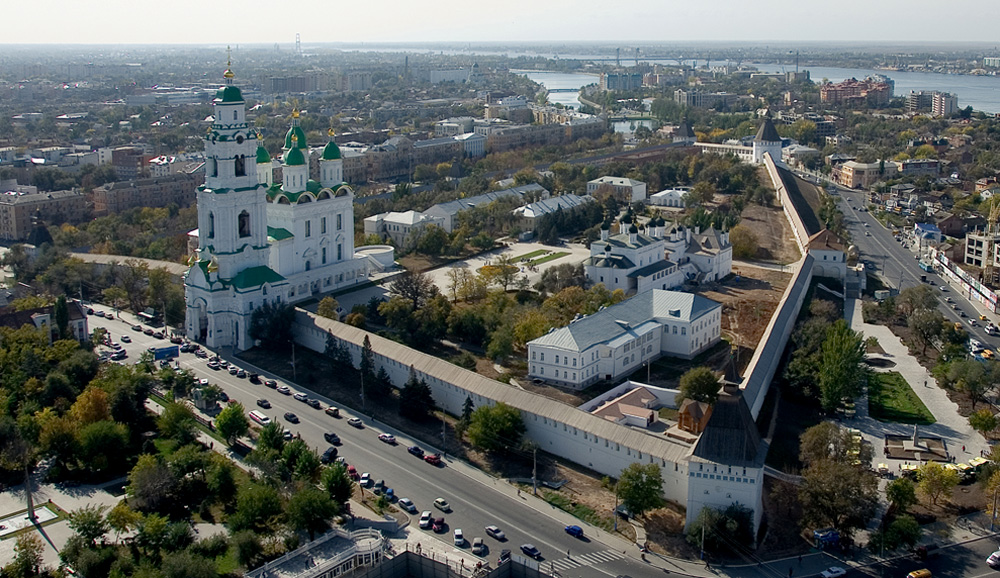
- View of Astrakhan Dormition of the Virgin Cathedral Astrakhan Stock Exchange Nikolskaya Street View of the Astrakhan Kremlin

- Flag Coat of arms
- Anthem: Anthem of Astrakhan
- Interactive map of Astrakhan
- Location of Astrakhan Astrakhan (European Russia) Astrakhan (Russia) Astrakhan (Europe) Astrakhan (Caspian Sea)
- Coordinates: 46°21′00″N 48°02′06″E
- Country: Russia
- Federal subject: Astrakhan Oblast
- Founded: 1558
- City status since: 1717

Government
  - Body: City Duma
  - Head: Oleg Polumordvinov

Area
  - Total: 208.70 km^{2} (80.58 sq mi)
- Elevation: −25 m (−82 ft)

Population (2010 Census)
  - Total: 520,339
  - Estimate (2025): 530,900 (+2%)
  - Rank: 33rd in 2010
  - Density: 2,493.2/km^{2} (6,457.5/sq mi)

Administrative status
  - Subordinated to: city of oblast significance of Astrakhan
  - Capital of: Astrakhan Oblast, city of oblast significance of Astrakhan

Municipal status
  - Urban okrug: Astrakhan Urban Okrug
  - Capital of: Astrakhan Urban Okrug
- Time zone: UTC+4 (MSK+1)
- Postal codes: 414000, 414004, 414006, 414008, 414009, 414011–414019, 414021, 414022, 414024–414026, 414028–414030, 414032, 414038, 414040–414042, 414044–414046, 414050–414052, 414056, 414057, 414700, 414890, 414899, 414950, 414960, 414961, 414999
- Dialing code: +7 8512
- OKTMO ID: 12701000001
- City Day: Third Sunday of September
- Website: www.astrgorod.ru

Astrakhan (Note: Russian: Астраха́н, romanized: Astrakhan, lit. 'pronounced [ˈastrəxənʲ]') is the largest city and administrative centre of Astrakhan Oblast in southern Russia. The city lies on two banks of the Volga, in the upper part of the Volga Delta, on eleven islands of the Caspian Depression, 100 km (62 mi) from the Caspian Sea, with a population of 475,629 residents at the 2021 Census. At an elevation of 28 meters (92 ft) below sea level, it is the lowest city in Russia.

Astrakhan was formerly the capital of the Khanate of Astrakhan (a remnant of the Golden Horde) of the Astrakhan Tatars, and was located on the higher right bank of the Volga, eleven kilometres (6.8 mi) from the present-day city. Situated on caravan and water routes, it developed from a village into a large trading centre, before being conquered by Timur in 1395 and captured by Ivan the Terrible in 1556. It was moved to its present site in 1558.

The oldest economic and cultural center of the Lower Volga region, it is often called the southernmost outpost of Russia, and the Caspian capital. The city is a member of the Eurasian Regional Office of the World Organization United Cities and Local Governments. The great ethnic diversity of its population gives a varied character to Astrakhan. The city is the center of the Astrakhan metropolitan area.

== Etymology ==
Astrakhan was originally the Russian name for Hajji Tarkhan, a Golden Horde city which was located 12 km (7.5 mi) from the site of today's Astrakhan. Hajji Tarkhan consists of the words hajji (an honorific title given to Muslims who have made the pilgrimage to Mecca) and tarkhan, a term used in the Mongol states for a man not subject to taxation. Other historical forms include al-Hajj Tarkhan (Arabic), Ejder Khan (Ottoman Turkish), Heshter Khan or Hashtarkhan (Persian), and Astorokhan (Russian). A Tatar legend first recorded by the Arab traveler Ibn Battuta relates that the settlement was founded by a Turkic pilgrim to Mecca, whose piety earned the future city exemption from taxation.

== History ==
=== Medieval history ===
Astrakhan is in the Volga Delta, which is rich in sturgeon and exotic plants. The fertile area formerly contained the capitals of Khazaria and the Golden Horde. Astrakhan was first mentioned by travelers in the early 13th century as Xacitarxan. Tamerlane burnt it to the ground in 1395 during his war with the Golden Horde. From 1459 to 1556, Xacitarxan was the capital of Astrakhan Khanate by the Astrakhan Tatars. The ruins of this medieval settlement were found by archaeologists 12 km upstream from the modern-day city.

Starting in A.D. 1324, Ibn Battuta, the famous Berber Muslim traveler, began his pilgrimage from his native city of Tangier, present-day Morocco to Mecca. Along the 12,100-kilometer (7,500 mi) trek, which took nearly 29 years, Battuta came in contact with many new cultures, which he writes about in his diaries. One specific country that he passed through on his journey was the Golden Horde ruled by the descendants of Genghis Khan, located on the Volga River in southern Russia; which Battuta refers to as the river Athal. He then claims the Athal is, "one of the greatest rivers in the world". In the winter, the Khan stays in Astrakhan. Due to the cold water, Özbeg Khan ordered the people of Astrakhan to lay many bundles of hay down on the frozen river. He does this to allow the people to travel over the ice. When Battuta and the Khan spoke about Battuta visiting Constantinople, which the Khan granted him permission to do, the Khan then gifted Battuta with fifteen hundred dinars, many horses, and a dress of honor.

In 1556, the khanate was conquered by Ivan the Terrible, who had a new fortress, or kremlin, built on a steep hill overlooking the Volga in 1558. This year is traditionally considered to be the foundation of the modern city.

In 1569, during the Russo-Turkish War, Astrakhan was besieged by the Ottomans, who had to retreat in disarray. A year later, the Ottoman sultan renounced his claims to Astrakhan, thus opening the entire Volga River to Russian traffic. The Ottoman Empire, though militarily defeated, insisted on safe passage for Muslim pilgrims and traders from Central Asia as well as the destruction of the Russian fort on the Terek River. In the 17th century, the city was developed as a Russian gate to the Orient. Many merchants from Armenia, Safavid Persia, Mughal India, and Khivan Khanate settled in the town, giving it a cosmopolitan character.

=== Modern history ===
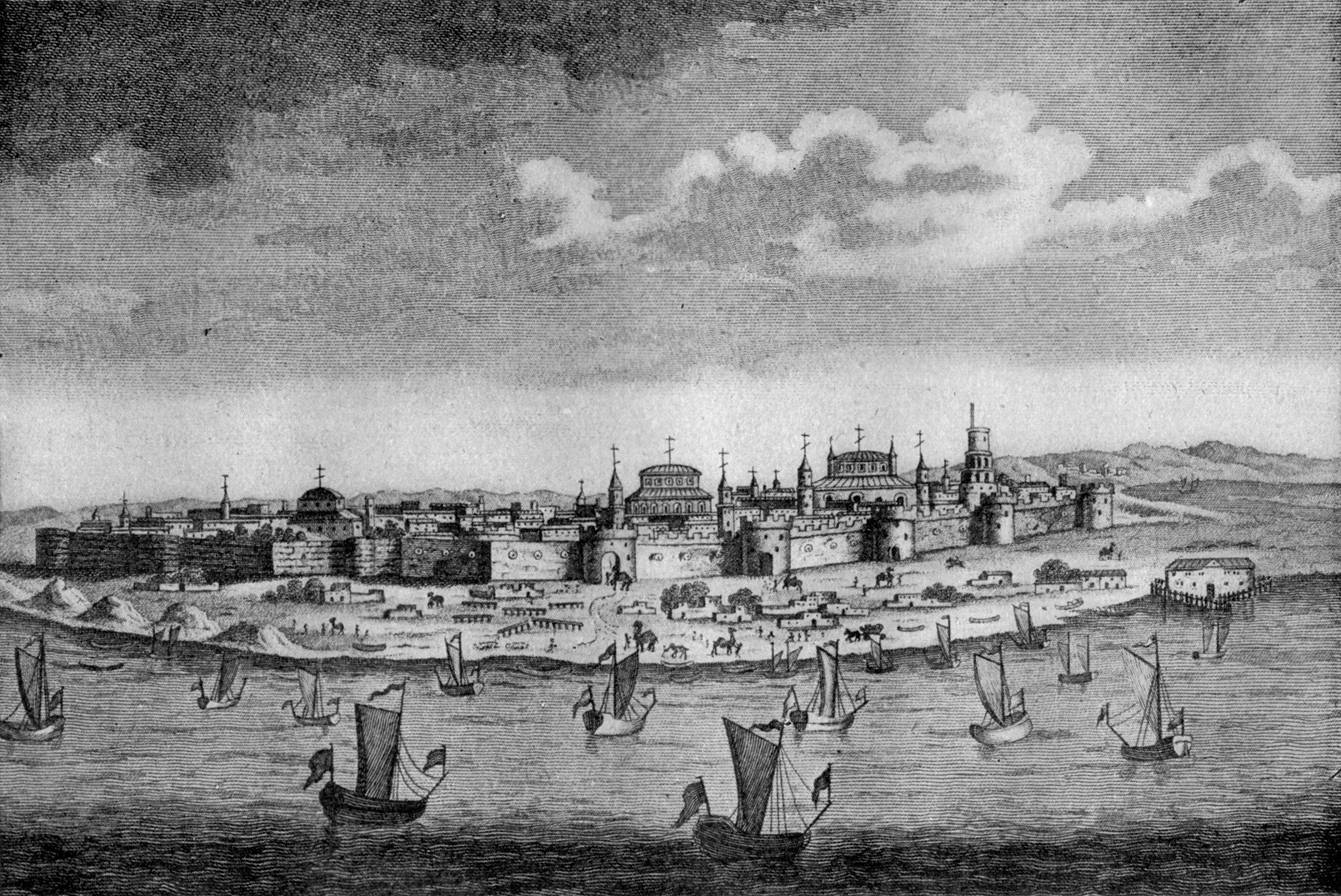
Astrakhan in the 17th century

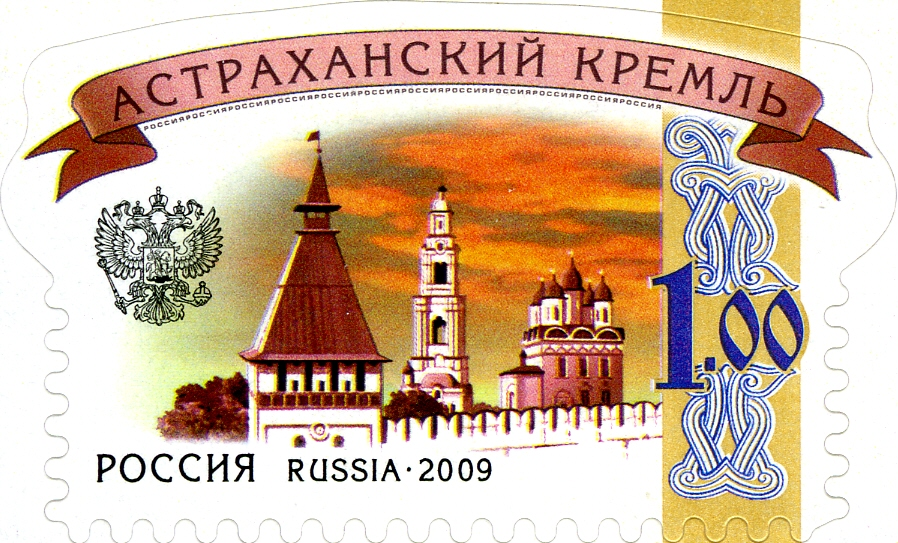
Astrakhan Kremlin on the definitive postage stamp of Russia

Historical population
Year	Pop.	±%
1897	112,880	—
1926	183,254	+62.3%
1939	253,595	+38.4%
1959	295,768	+16.6%
1970	410,473	+38.8%
1979	461,003	+12.3%
1989	509,210	+10.5%
2002	504,501	−0.9%
2010	520,339	+3.1%
2021	475,629	−8.6%
Source: Census Data

For seventeen months in 1670–1671, Astrakhan was held by Stenka Razin and his Cossacks. Early in the following century, Peter the Great constructed a shipyard here and made Astrakhan the base for his hostilities against Persia, and later in the same century Catherine the Great accorded the city important industrial privileges.

The city was held from 1707 by the Cossacks under Kondraty Bulavin during the Bulavin Rebellion until they were defeated the next year. A Kalmuck khan laid an abortive siege to the kremlin several years before that.

In 1717, it became the seat of Astrakhan Governorate, whose first governors included Artemy Petrovich Volynsky and Vasily Nikitich Tatishchev. Six years later, Astrakhan served as a base for the first Russian venture into Central Asia. In 1702, 1718 and 1767, it suffered severely from fires; in 1719 it was plundered by the Safavid Persians; and in 1830, cholera killed much of the populace.

The Astrakhan Kremlin was built from the 1580s to the 1620s from bricks taken from the site of Sarai Berke. Its two impressive cathedrals were consecrated in 1700 and 1710, respectively. Built by masters from Yaroslavl, they retain many traditional features of Russian church architecture, while their exterior decoration is definitely baroque.

In March 1919 after a failed workers' revolt against Bolshevik rule, 3,000 to 5,000 people were executed in less than a week by the Cheka under orders from Sergey Kirov. Some victims had stones tied around their necks and were thrown into the Volga.

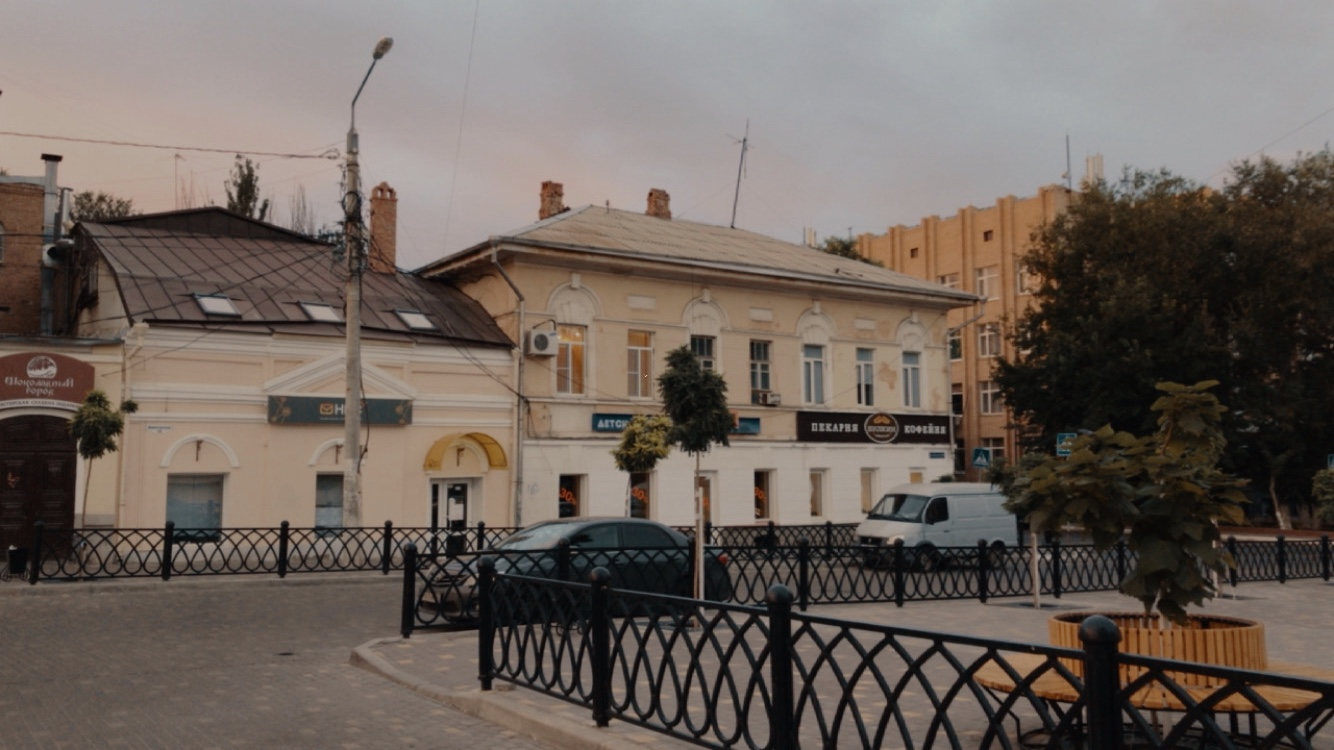
Akhamtovskaya Street

During Operation Barbarossa, the German invasion of the Soviet Union in 1941, the A–A line running from Astrakhan to Arkhangelsk was to be the eastern limit of German military operation and occupation. The plan was never carried out, as Germany captured neither the two cities nor Moscow. In the autumn of 1942, the region to the west of Astrakhan became one of the easternmost points in the Soviet Union reached by the invading German Wehrmacht, during Case Blue, the offensive which led to the Battle of Stalingrad. Light armored forces of German Army Group A made brief scouting missions as close as 35 km to Astrakhan before withdrawing. In the same period, elements of both the Luftwaffe's KG 4 and KG 100 bomber wings attacked Astrakhan, flying several air raids and bombing the city's oil terminals and harbor installations.

In 1943, Astrakhan was made the seat of a Soviet oblast within the RSFSR. The oblast was retained as a national province of the independent Russian Federation in the 1991 administrative reshuffle after the dissolution of the Soviet Union.

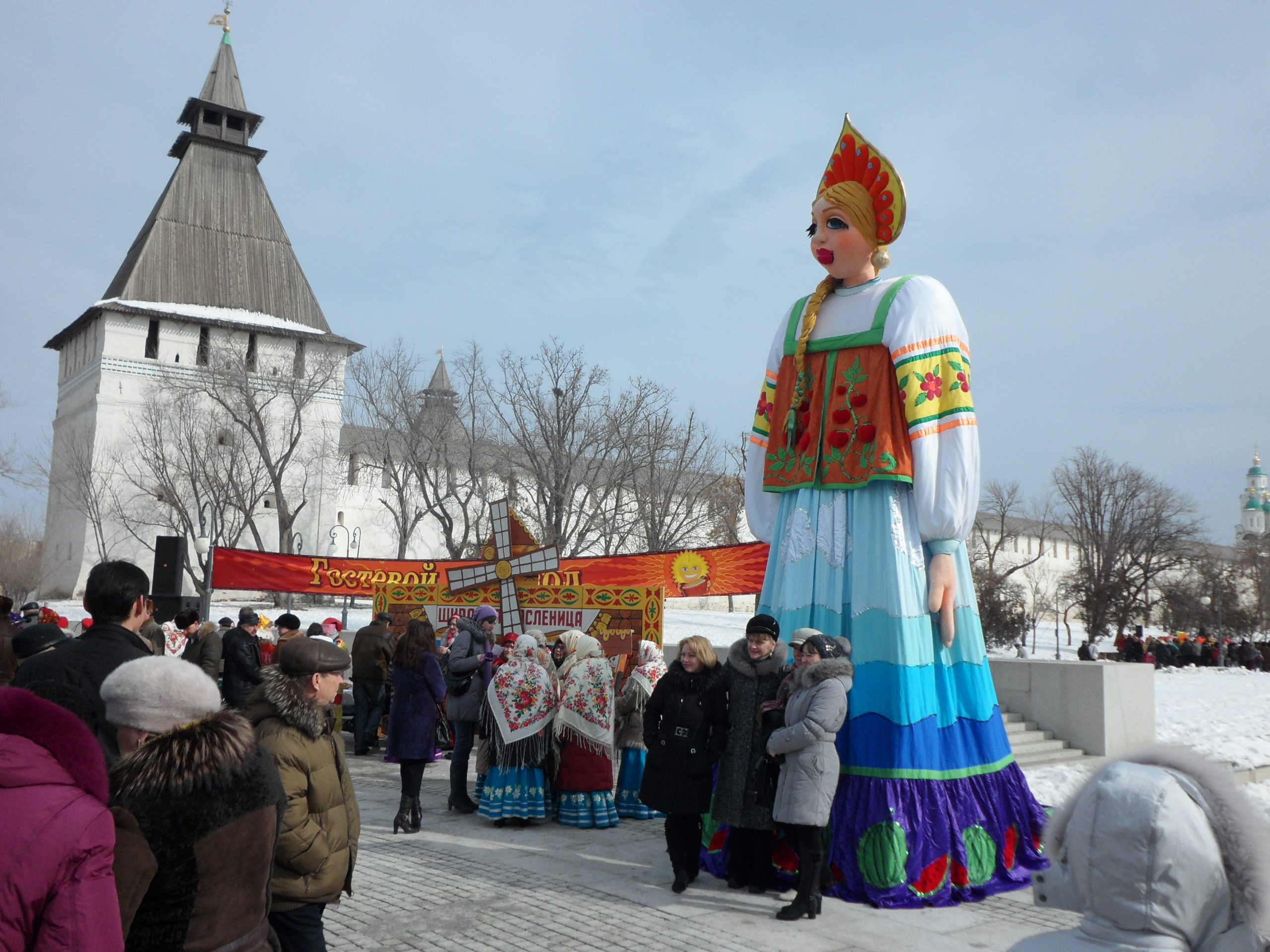
Astrakhan in 2012

In the present day, Astrakhan is a large industrial centre of the Volga country, Russia, with a population of over 500,000. Starting nearly 400 years ago and continuing to the present day, Astrakhan has been Russia's main center of fish processing. The market for fish is a large component of the economy in this city.

Owing to shared Caspian borders, Astrakhan recently has been playing a significant role in the relations between Russia and Azerbaijan. As the latter's government has been heavily investing into the wellbeing of the city, Astrakhan has recently begun to symbolize the friendship between both countries. In 2010 a bridge was constructed with donations from Azerbaijan, which was named "Bridge of Friendship". Moreover, Azerbaijani government sponsored secondary school number 11, which carries the name of the national leader Heydar Aliyev, as well as a children's entertainment center named "Dream". Apart from that, a park has been built in the center of Astrakhan which is dedicated to friendship between the two countries. In the last 5 years Astrakhan has been visited by top Azerbaijani delegations on several occasions.

After fraud was alleged in the mayoral election of 2012 and the United Russia candidate was declared the winner, organizers of the 2011–2012 Russian protests supported the defeated candidate, Oleg V. Shein of Just Russia, in a hunger strike. Protestors, buoyed by celebrities who support the reform movement, attracted 5,000 people to a rally on 14 April.

== Administrative and municipal status ==
Astrakhan is the administrative center of the oblast. Within the framework of administrative divisions, it is incorporated as the city of oblast significance of Astrakhan—an administrative unit with the status equal to that of the districts. As a municipal division, the city of oblast significance of Astrakhan is incorporated as Astrakhan Urban Okrug.

The city of Astrakhan is further subdivided into four administrative districts: Kirovsky, Leninsky, Sovetsky and Truskovsky.

== Demographics ==
=== Religion ===
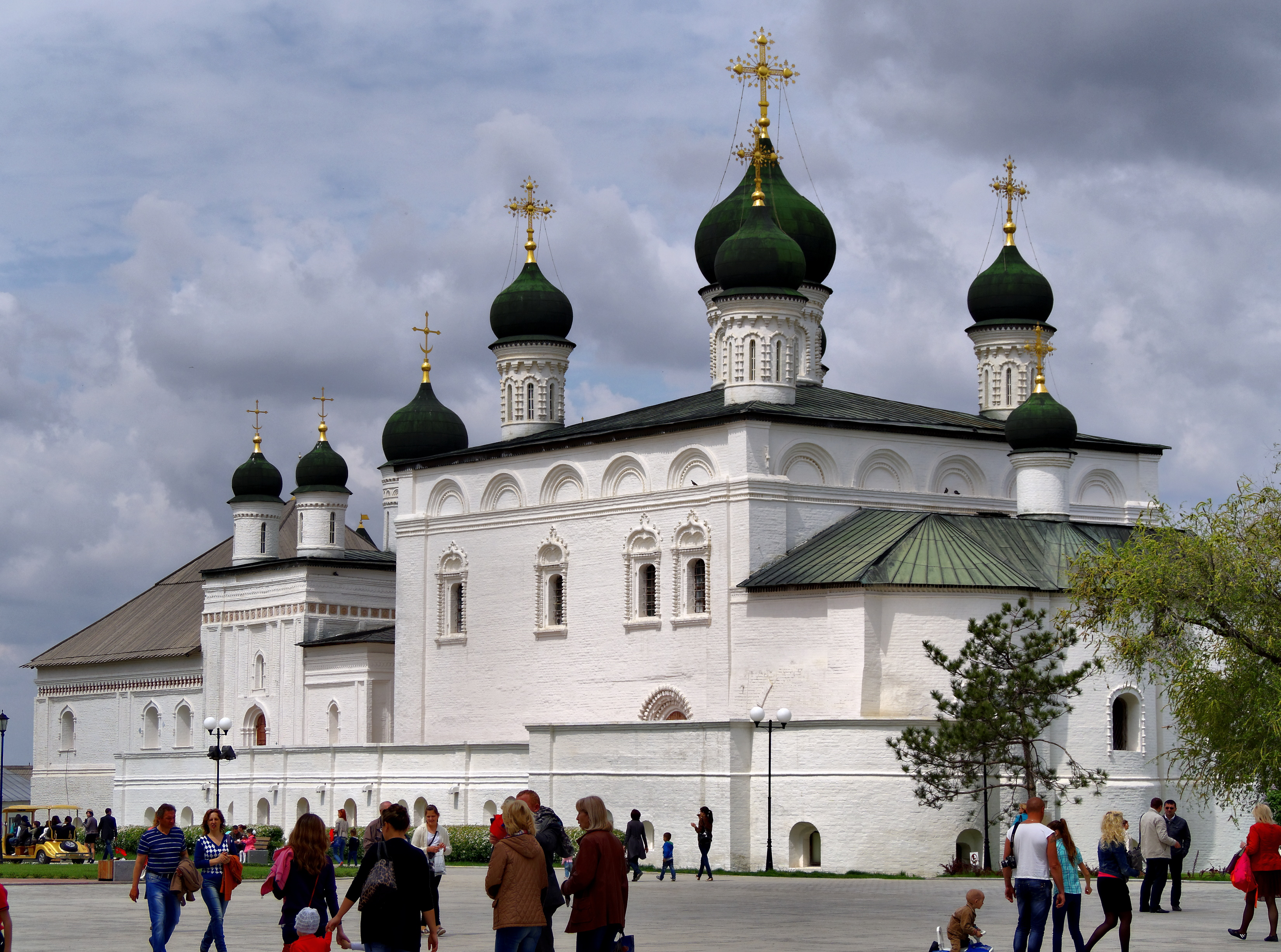
Trinity Cathedral in the Astrakhan Kremlin

Astrakhan is the archiepiscopal see of one of the metropolitanates and (as Astrakhan and Yenotayevka) eparchies of the Russian Orthodox Church, its only other suffragan being Akhtubinsk. There is also a Catholic community, served by the Church of the Assumption of Mary (Astrakhan). There is also a substantial Muslim population made up of Astrakhan Tatars and other Muslims. At 1777 the white Mosque was built, and the Baku Mosque was built in 1907–1909.

=== Population ===
According to the results of the 2021 Census, the population of Astrakhan was 475,629.

At the time of the official 2021 Census, the ethnic makeup of the city's population was:

Ethnicity	Population	Percentage
Russians	293,620	78.8%
Kazakhs	23,965	6.4%
Astrakhan Tatars	21,179	5.7%
Azerbaijanis	4,213	1.1%
Nogais	4,163	1.1%
Lezgins	2,823	0.8%
Armenians	2,727	0.7%
Avars	2,469	0.7%
Chechens	1,684	0.5%
Ukrainians	1,681	0.5%
Kalmyks	1,077	0.3%
Agrzhan	12,926	3.5%

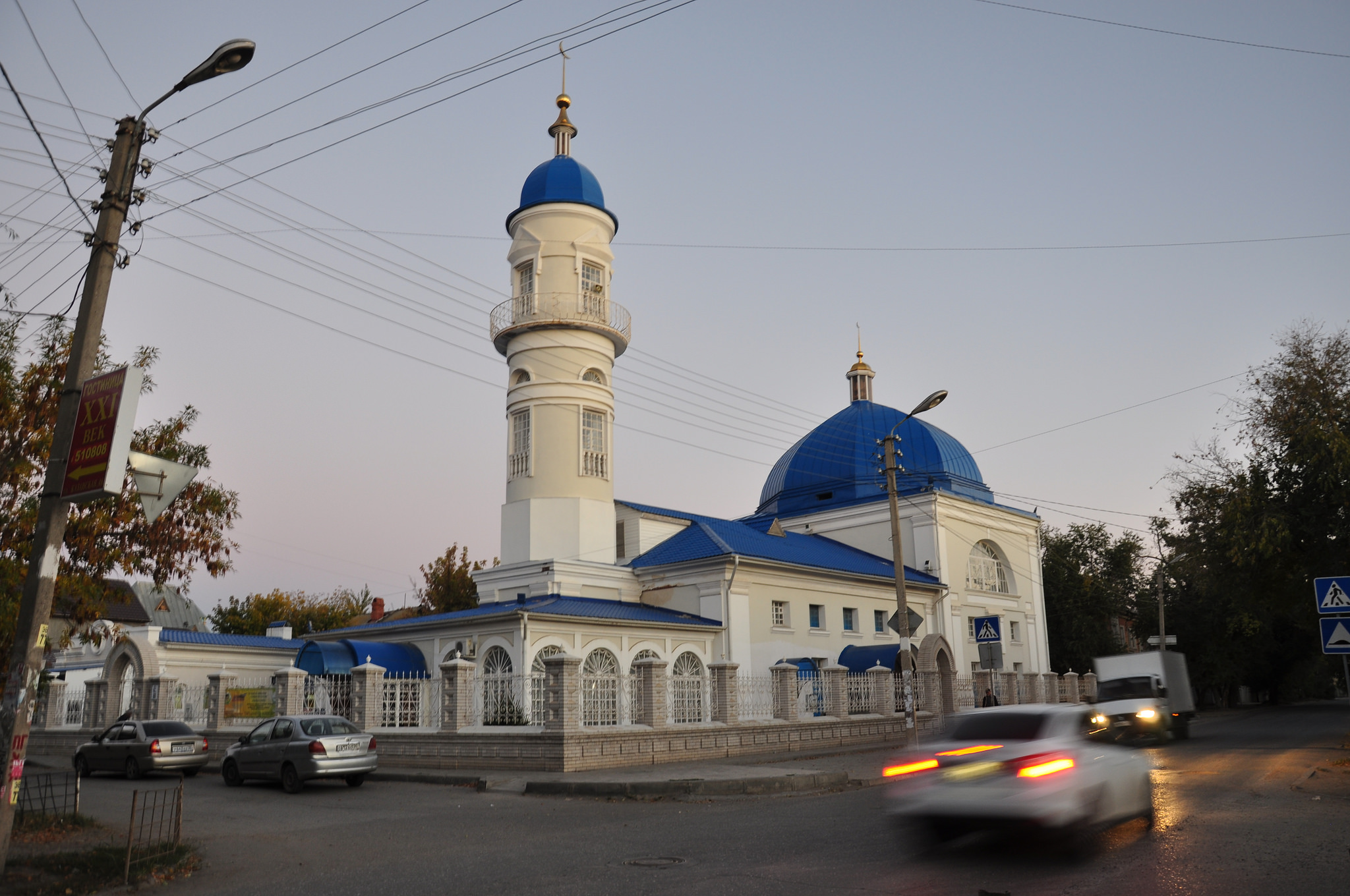
White Mosque of Astrakhan

== Geography ==
The city lies on two banks of the Volga, in the upper part of the Volga Delta, on eleven islands of the Caspian Depression, 60 miles (100 km) from the Caspian Sea. At an elevation of 28 meters (92 ft) below sea level, it is the lowest city in all of Russia.

=== Climate ===
Astrakhan features a continental cold semi-arid climate (Köppen climate classification: BSk) with cold winters and hot summers. Astrakhan is one of the driest cities in Europe. Rainfall is scarce but relatively evenly distributed throughout the course of the year with, however, more precipitation (58%) in the hot season (six hottest months of the year).

The below sea-level elevation and long distance from the ocean of Astrakhan significantly influences the climate. Winters are cold with average January temperature −3.6 °С (25.5 °F). Summer temperatures in Astrakhan are one of the highest in Russia with average July temperature 26.1 °С (79 °F) and may reach 40 °С (104 °F) and higher. The summers are much hotter than found further west on similar latitude in Europe and worldwide for 46°N apart from a few other desert cities such as Karamay in northwestern China and the town of Desert Aire, Washington in the United States. The mean annual temperature amplitude (difference between the mean monthly temperatures of the hottest and coldest months) is thus equal to 29.7 °С (85.5 °F) so the climate is truly continental.

Climate data for Astrakhan (1991–2020, extremes 1837–present)
Month	Jan	Feb	Mar	Apr	May	Jun	Jul	Aug	Sep	Oct	Nov	Dec	Year
Record high °C (°F)	14.2 (57.6)	17.1 (62.8)	27.5 (81.5)	32.0 (89.6)	36.8 (98.2)	40.6 (105.1)	41.0 (105.8)	40.8 (105.4)	38.0 (100.4)	29.9 (85.8)	21.6 (70.9)	16.4 (61.5)	41.0 (105.8)
Mean daily maximum °C (°F)	−0.1 (31.8)	1.5 (34.7)	8.8 (47.8)	17.6 (63.7)	24.7 (76.5)	30.1 (86.2)	32.6 (90.7)	31.4 (88.5)	24.6 (76.3)	16.8 (62.2)	7.3 (45.1)	1.3 (34.3)	16.4 (61.5)
Daily mean °C (°F)	−3.6 (25.5)	−3.0 (26.6)	3.2 (37.8)	11.3 (52.3)	18.5 (65.3)	23.8 (74.8)	26.1 (79.0)	24.6 (76.3)	18.0 (64.4)	10.9 (51.6)	3.1 (37.6)	−1.8 (28.8)	10.9 (51.6)
Mean daily minimum °C (°F)	−6.5 (20.3)	−6.5 (20.3)	−1.0 (30.2)	5.9 (42.6)	12.7 (54.9)	17.7 (63.9)	19.9 (67.8)	18.3 (64.9)	12.5 (54.5)	6.3 (43.3)	−0.1 (31.8)	−4.5 (23.9)	6.2 (43.2)
Record low °C (°F)	−31.8 (−25.2)	−33.6 (−28.5)	−26.9 (−16.4)	−8.9 (16.0)	−1.1 (30.0)	5.4 (41.7)	10.1 (50.2)	6.1 (43.0)	−2.0 (28.4)	−10.5 (13.1)	−25.8 (−14.4)	−29.9 (−21.8)	−33.6 (−28.5)
Average precipitation mm (inches)	15 (0.6)	12 (0.5)	17 (0.7)	25 (1.0)	28 (1.1)	25 (1.0)	22 (0.9)	17 (0.7)	16 (0.6)	19 (0.7)	17 (0.7)	18 (0.7)	231 (9.1)
Average extreme snow depth cm (inches)	2 (0.8)	2 (0.8)	1 (0.4)	0 (0)	0 (0)	0 (0)	0 (0)	0 (0)	0 (0)	0 (0)	0 (0)	1 (0.4)	2 (0.8)
Average rainy days	8	6	7	11	12	11	10	9	9	9	12	10	114
Average snowy days	14	12	7	0.4	0	0	0	0	0	0	6	12	51
Average relative humidity (%)	84	80	73	63	61	58	58	59	66	74	83	86	70
Mean monthly sunshine hours	87	106	163	226	293	316	332	309	252	181	84	58	2,407
Source 1: Pogoda.ru.net
Source 2: NOAA (sun, 1961–1990)

== Education ==
Astrakhan has five institutions of higher education. These include Astrakhan State Technical University, Astrakhan State University, and Astrakhan State Medical University.

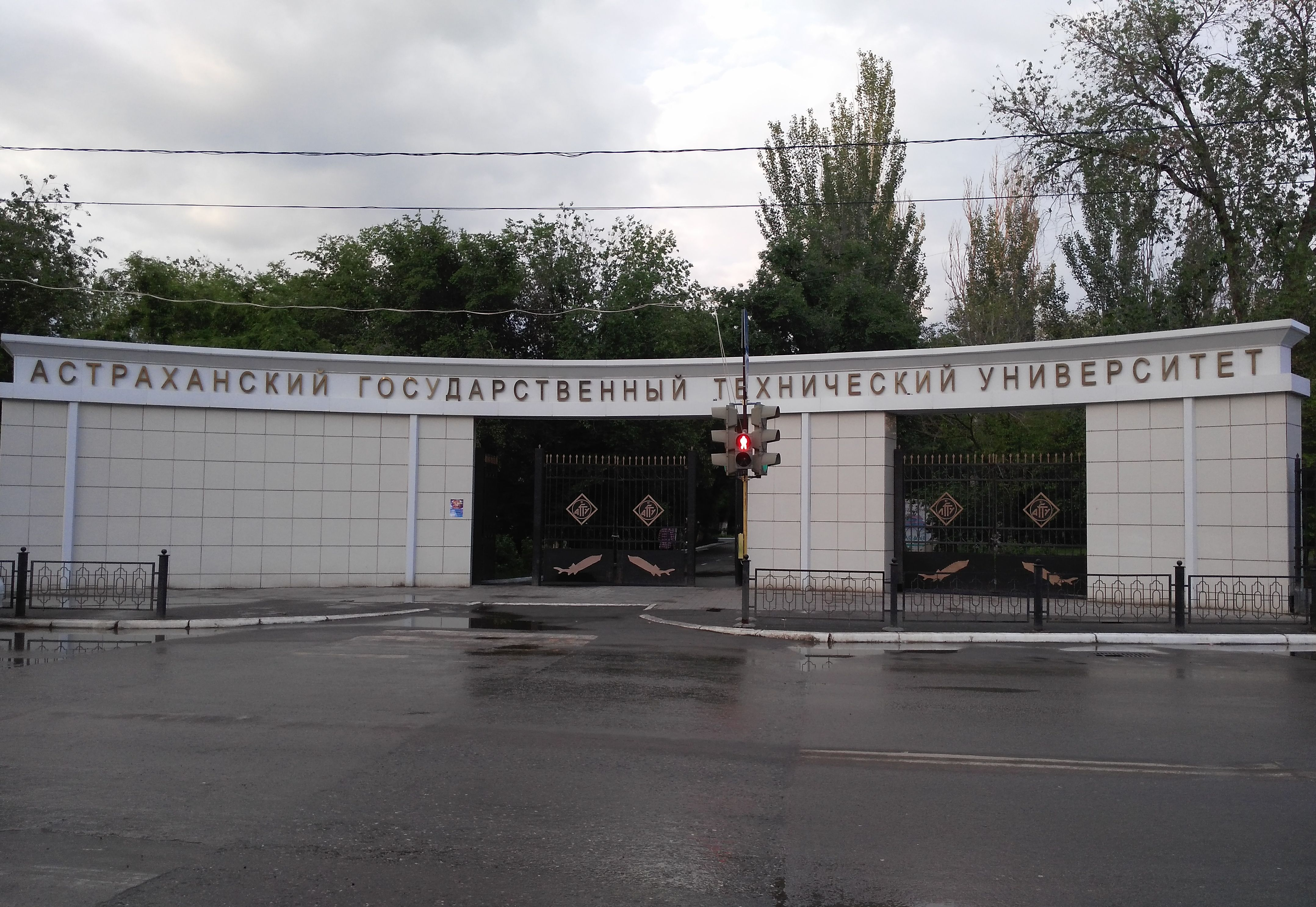
Astrakhan State Technical University

== Transportation ==
The city is served by Narimanovo Airport named after Soviet Azerbaijani politician Nariman Narimanov. It is managed by OAO Aeroport Astrakhan. After its reconstruction and the building of the international sector, opened in February 2011, Narimanovo Airport is one of the most modern regional airports in Russia. There are direct flights between Astrakhan and Aktau, Istanbul, St. Petersburg and Moscow.

There is also a military airbase nearby (Astrakhan (air base)).

Astrakhan is linked by rail to the north (Volgograd and Moscow), the east (Atyrau and Kazakhstan) and the south (Makhachkala and Baku). There are direct trains to Moscow, Volgograd, Saint Petersburg, Baku, Kyiv, Brest and other towns. Intercity and international buses are available as well. Public local transport is mainly provided by buses and minibuses called marshrutkas. Until 2007 there were also trams, and until 2017 trolleybuses.

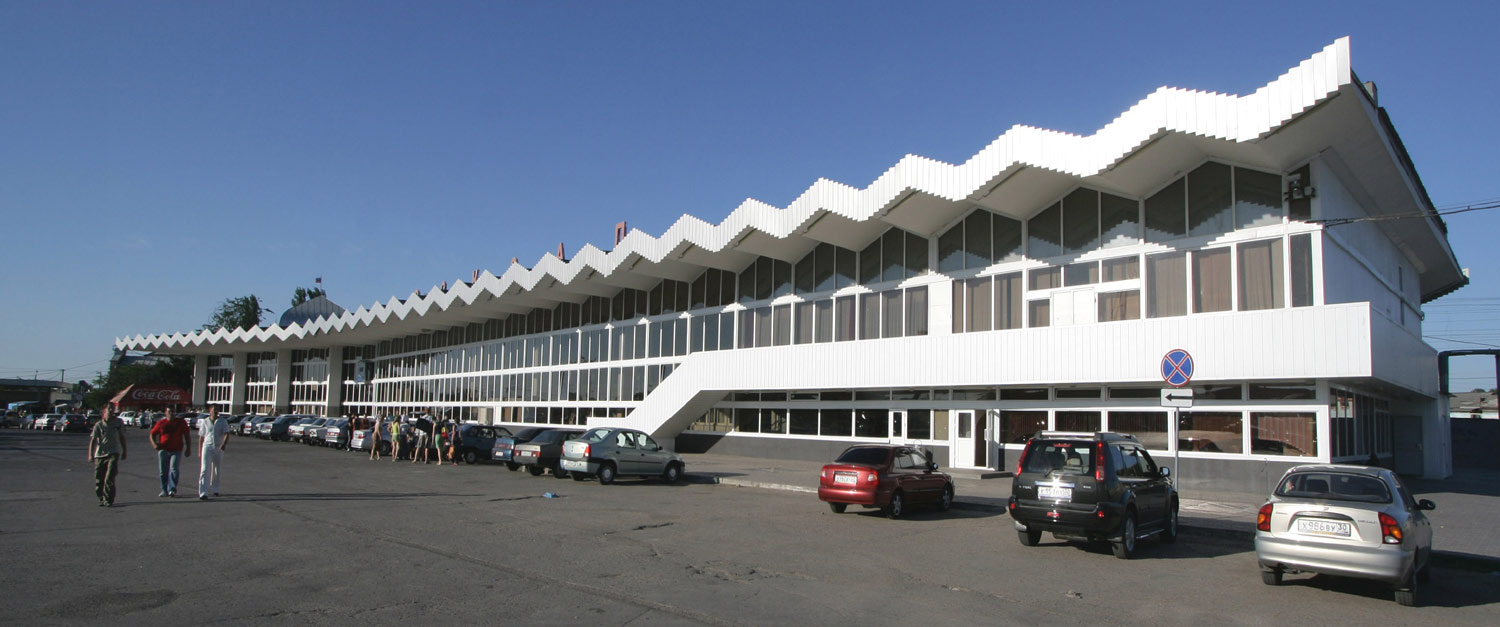
Astrakhan railroad station

European Route 40 runs through here.

== Notable people ==
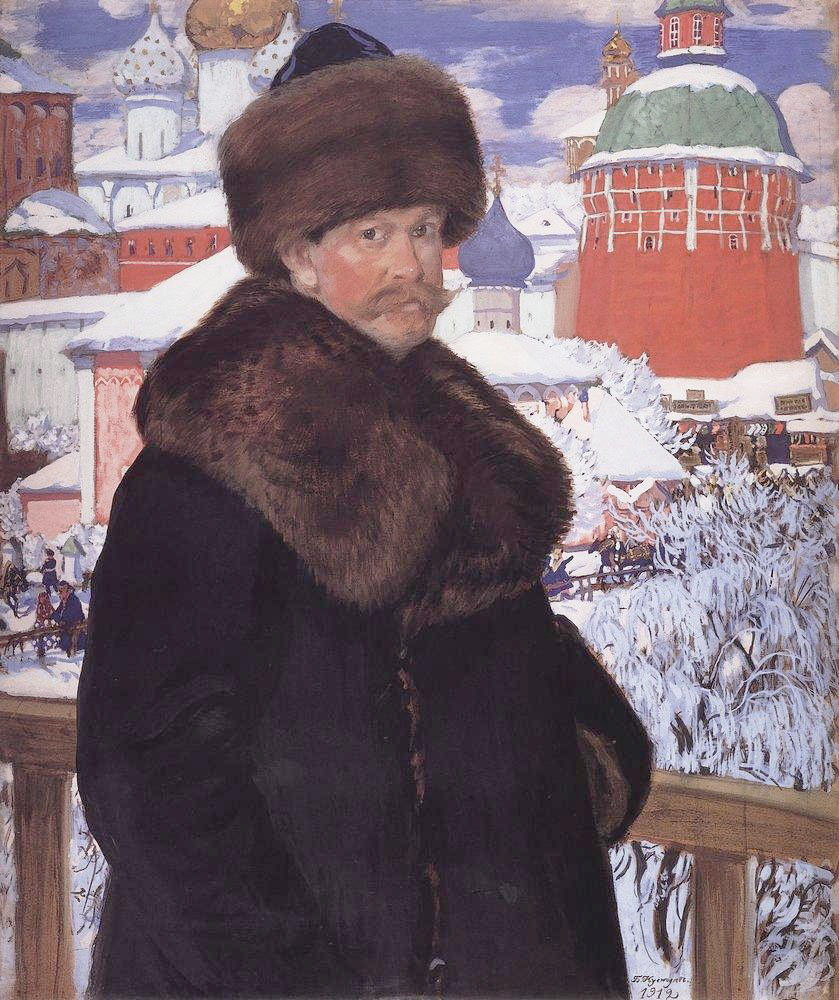
Self-portrait of Boris Kustodiev in front of Troitse-Sergiyeva Lavra, 1912, Uffizi

- Luara Hayrapetyan, singer
- Boris Kustodiev, painter
- Sergey Aganov, Soviet Armenian Marshal of the Engineer Troops
- Joseph Deniker, naturalist and anthropologist
- Ilya Ulyanov, father of Aleksandr Ulyanov and Vladimir Lenin.
- Rinat Dasayev, association football player
- Marziyya Davudova, actress
- Velimir Khlebnikov, poet
- Andrei Belyanin, science fiction writer
- Dmitri Dyuzhev, actor
- Maksim Gleykin, former professional football player
- Vasily Trediakovsky, academic, poet, translator
- Tamara Milashkina, soprano
- Valeria Barsova, soprano
- Maria Maksakova, Sr., mezzo-soprano
- Elena Nikitina, skeleton racer
- Yelena Shalamova, rhythmic gymnast
- Natalia Sokolovskaya, pianist and composer
- Nikolai Petrovich Skarzhinsky Russian Cossack Lieutenant decorated at the Battle of Borodino.
- Pytor Mikhailovich Skarzhinsky Russian general and governor of Astrakhan.
- Sergei Yakushev, actor

== Twin towns and sister cities ==
Astrakhan is twinned with:

- Sari, Mazandaran Province, Iran
- Rasht, Gilan Province, Iran
- Ahmedabad, Gujarat, India
- Fort Lauderdale, United States
- Atyrau, Kazakhstan
- Brest, Belarus
- Grand-Popo, Benin
- Pembroke Pines, United States
- Ljubljana, Slovenia
- Islamabad, Pakistan
- Türkmenbaşy, Turkmenistan
- Mogilev, Belarus
- Vitebsk, Belarus

== See also ==
- Astrakhan Jews
- Astrakhan Tatars

== Sources ==
- Государственная Дума Астраханской области. Закон №67/2006-ОЗ от 4 октября 2006 г. «Об административно-территориальном устройстве Астраханской области», в ред. Закона №46/2017-ОЗ от 5 сентября 2017 г. «О преобразовании муниципальных образований и административно-территориальных единиц "Лебяжинский сельсовет", "Образцово-Травинский сельсовет", "Полдневский сельсовет" и внесении изменений в Закон Астраханской области "Об установлении границ муниципальных образований и наделении их статусом сельского, городского поселения, городского округа, муниципального района" и Закон Астраханской области "Об административно-территориальном устройстве Астраханской области"». Вступил в силу по истечении 10 дней со дня официального опубликования. Опубликован: "Сборник законов и нормативных правовых актов Астраханской области", №47, 19 октября 2006 г. (State Duma of Astrakhan Oblast. Law #67/2006-OZ of October 4, 2006 On the Administrative-Territorial Structure of Astrakhan Oblast, as amended by the Law #46/2017-OZ of September 5, 2017 On the Transformation of the Municipal Formations and the Administrative-Territorial Units of "Lebyazhinsky Selsoviet", "Obraztsovo-Travinsky Selsoviet", "Poldnevsky Selsoviet", and Amending the Law of Astrakhan Oblast "On Establishing the Borders of the Municipal Formations and on Granting Them the Status of Rural, Urban Settlement, Urban Okrug, Municipal District" and the Law of Astrakhan Oblast "On the Administrative-Territorial Structure of Astrakhan Oblast". Effective as of after ten days from the day of the official publication have passed.).
- Государственная Дума Астраханской области. Закон №43/2004-ОЗ от 6 августа 2004 г. «Об установлении границ муниципальных образований и наделении их статусом сельского, городского поселения, городского округа, муниципального района», в ред. Закона №47/2017-ОЗ от 5 сентября 2017 г. «О внесении изменений в Закон Астраханской области "Об установлении границ муниципальных образований и наделении их статусом сельского, городского поселения, городского округа, муниципального района"». Вступил в силу через 10 дней со дня официального опубликования. Опубликован: "Астраханские известия", №34, 12 августа 2004 г. (State Duma of Astrakhan Oblast. Law #43/2004-OZ of August 6, 2004 On Establishing the Borders of the Municipal Formations and on Granting Them the Status of Rural, Urban Settlement, Urban Okrug, Municipal District, as amended by the Law #47/2017-OZ of September 5, 2017 On Amending the Law of Astrakhan Oblast "On Establishing the Borders of the Municipal Formations and on Granting Them the Status of Rural, Urban Settlement, Urban Okrug, Municipal District". Effective as of the day which is 10 days after the official publication.).
- Городская Дума муниципального образования "Город Астрахань". Решение №24 от 31 марта 2016 г. «Устав муниципального образования "Город Астрахань"», в ред. Решения №91 от 17 июля 2017 г. «О внесении изменений в Устав муниципального образования "Город Астрахань"». Вступил в силу 22 апреля 2016 г. (за исключением отдельных положений). Опубликован: "Астраханский вестник", №15, 21 апреля 2016 г. (City Duma of the Municipal Formation of the "City of Astrakhan". Decision #24 of March 31, 2016 Charter of the Municipal Formation of the "City of Astrakhan", as amended by the Decision #91 of July 17, 2017 On Amending the Charter of the Municipal Formation of the "City of Astrakhan". Effective as of April 22, 2016 (with the exception of certain clauses).).
- Государственная Дума Астраханской области. №21/2007-ОЗ 9 апреля 2007 г. «Устав Астраханской области», в ред. Закона №49/2017-ОЗ от 25 сентября 2017 г. «О внесении изменения в статью 17 Устава Астраханской области». Вступил в силу 30 апреля 2007 г. (за исключением отдельных положений). Опубликован: "Сборник законов и нормативных правовых актов Астраханской области", №18, 19 апреля 2007 г. (State Duma of Astrakhan Oblast. #21/2007-OZ April 9, 2007 Charter of Astrakhan Oblast, as amended by the Law #49/2017-OZ of September 25, 2017 On Amending Article 17 of the Charter of Astrakhan Oblast. Effective as of April 30, 2007 (with the exception of several clauses).).
- Городской Совет города Астрахани. Решение №123 от 1 ноября 2000 г. «Об утверждени гимна города Астрахани». (City Council of the City of Astrakhan. Decision #123 of November 1, 2000 On Adopting the Anthem of the City of Astrakhan. ).
