= Administrative divisions of Astrakhan Oblast =

Divisions of Astrakhan Oblast, Russia

Astrakhan Oblast Russia
- Administrative centre: Astrakhan

Administrative structure (as of 2015)
- Districts: 11
- Cities/towns: 6
- Urban-type settlements: 7
- Selsovets: 151

Municipal structure (as of 2002)
- Rural settlements: 427 (inhabited); 8 (uninhabited)

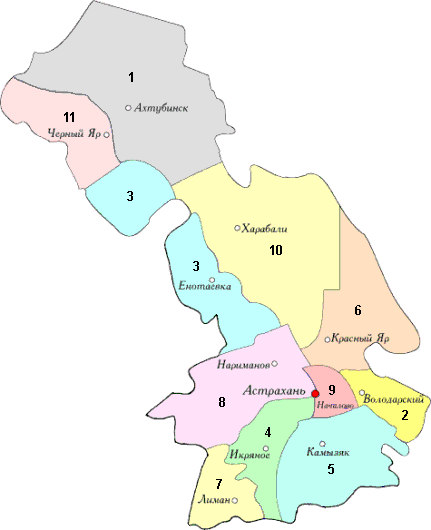
Map of Administrative divisions of Astrakhan Oblast

Altai Krai is a federal subject of Russia.

== Administrative and municipal divisions ==
- Towns under the federal government management:
  - Znamensk (Russian: Знаменск)
- Cities and towns under the oblast's jurisdiction:
  - Astrakhan (Астрахань) (administrative center)
    - city districts:
      - Kirovsky (Кировский)
      - Leninsky (Ленинский)
      - Sovetsky (Советский)
      - Trusovsky (Трусовский)
- Districts:
  - Akhtubinsky (Ахтубинский)
    - Towns under the district's jurisdiction:
      - Akhtubinsk (Ахтубинск)
    - Urban-type settlements under the district's jurisdiction:
      - Nizhny Baskunchak (Нижний Баскунчак)
      - Verkhny Baskunchak (Верхний Баскунчак)
    - with 12 selsovets under the district's jurisdiction.
  - Chernoyarsky (Черноярский)
    - with 10 selsovets under the district's jurisdiction.
  - Ikryaninsky (Икрянинский)
    - Urban-type settlements under the district's jurisdiction:
      - Ilyinka (Ильинка)
      - Krasnye Barrikady (Красные Баррикады)
    - with 15 selsovets under the district's jurisdiction.
  - Kamyzyaksky (Камызякский)
    - Towns under the district's jurisdiction:
      - Kamyzyak (Камызяк)
    - Urban-type settlements under the district's jurisdiction:
      - Kirovsky (Кировский)
      - Volgo-Kaspiysky (Волго-Каспийский)
    - with 16 selsovets under the district's jurisdiction.
  - Kharabalinsky (Харабалинский)
    - Towns under the district's jurisdiction:
      - Kharabali (Харабали)
    - with 9 selsovets under the district's jurisdiction.
  - Krasnoyarsky (Красноярский)
    - with 16 selsovets under the district's jurisdiction.
  - Limansky (Лиманский)
    - Urban-type settlements under the district's jurisdiction:
      - Liman (Лиман)
    - with 14 selsovets under the district's jurisdiction.
  - Narimanovsky (Наримановский)
    - Towns under the district's jurisdiction:
      - Narimanov (Нариманов)
    - with 12 selsovets under the district's jurisdiction.
  - Privolzhsky (Приволжский)
    - with 12 selsovets under the district's jurisdiction.
  - Volodarsky (Володарский)
    - with 21 selsovets under the district's jurisdiction.
  - Yenotayevsky (Енотаевский)
    - with 14 selsovets under the district's jurisdiction.
