= Kamyzyak (disambiguation) =

Kamyzyak is a town in Astrakhan Oblast, Russia.

Kamyzyak may also refer to:

- Kamyzyak Urban Settlement, a municipal formation which the town of district significance of Kamyzyak in Kamyzyaksky District of Astrakhan Oblast, Russia is incorporated as
- Kamyzyak (river), a river in Astrakhan Oblast, Russia; a distributary of the Volga
