= Bogdo-Baskunchak Nature Reserve =

Nature reserve in Astrakhan Oblast, Russia

Bogdinsko-Baskunchakski Nature Reserve
- Russian: Богдинско-Баскунчакский заповедник
- IUCN category Ia (strict nature reserve)
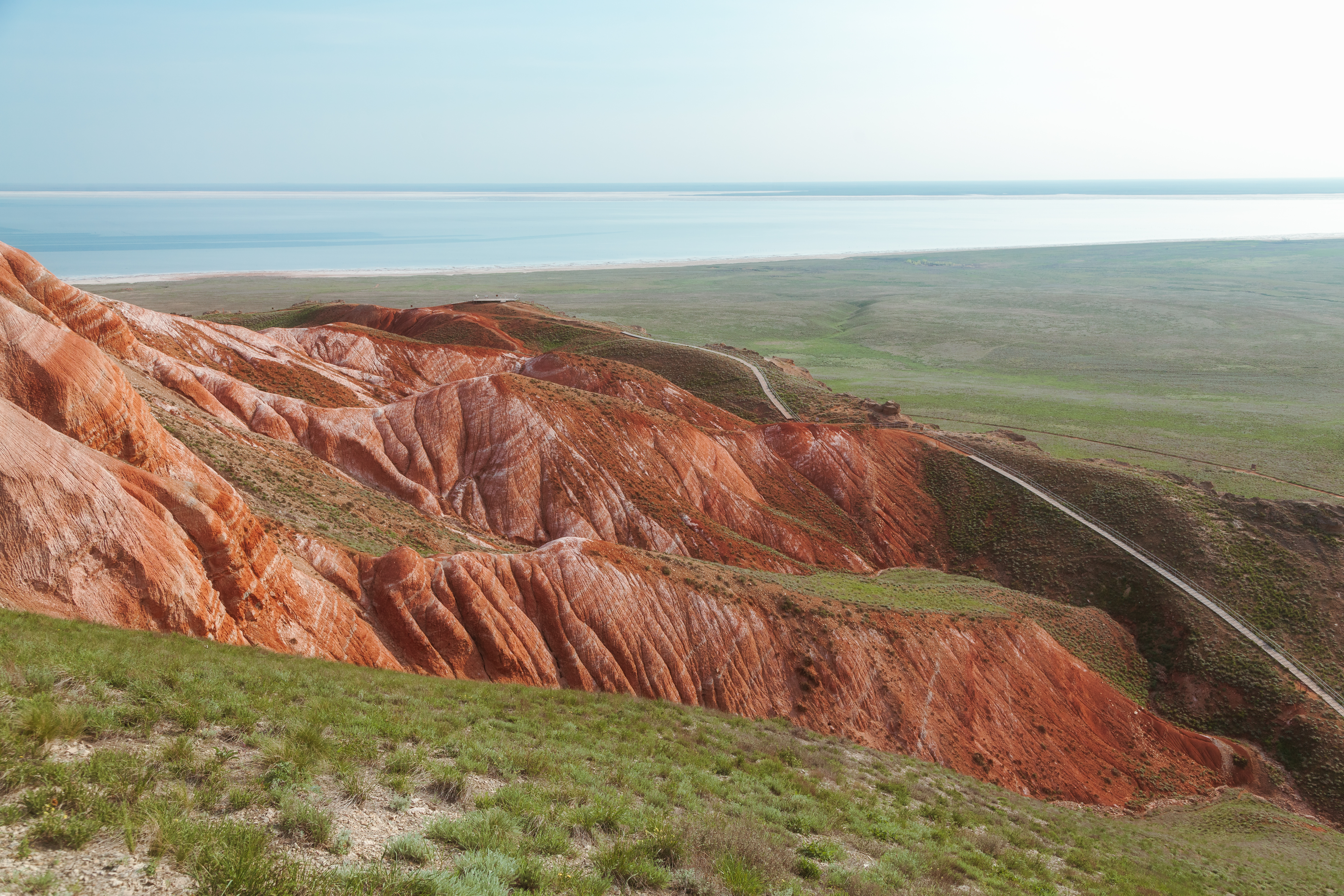
- Big Bogdo Mountain slope, with salt lake in distance

- Location within Russia
- Location: Astrakhan Oblast
- Nearest city: Akhtubinsk
- Coordinates: 48°12′42″N 46°52′50″E
- Area: 18,780 hectares (46,406 acres; 73 sq mi)
- Established: 1997
- Governing body: Ministry of Natural Resources and Environment (Russia)
- Website: https://www.bogdozap.ru/

Bogdinsko-Baskunchakski Nature Reserve (Russian: Богдинско-Баскунчакский) (also Bogdinsko-Baskunchaksky) is a Russian 'zapovednik' (strict nature reserve) in a semi-arid area around two notable features: Lake Baskunchak, Russia's largest undrained salt lake, and Big Bogdo Mountain, the highest point (at 147 meters) in the Caspian Depression and home to the "singing rocks". It is about halfway between Volgograd and Astrakhan, placing it about 200 km north of the Volga River Delta, where the river enters the Caspian Sea from the northwest. About 20 km east of the lake is the border with Kazakhstan. Baskunchak has been a source of salt to Russia for centuries. The reserve is an important site on the bird migration route between northern Siberia and wintering regions. The reserve is situated in the Akhtubinsky District of Astrakhan Oblast.

== Topography and geology ==
The reserve lies in the trough of the Caspian Depression, just east of the Volga's present main floodplain. The boundaries wrap around the north, east and south shores of the lake, and the mountain is in a separate sector just south of the lake. The main features, the shores of Lake Baskunchak and Big Bogdo Mountain, are seated about 25 meters below sea level. The top of Big Bogdo is 130 meters above the terrain. The hill itself is a karst (limestone) formation with over 30 caves. It is growing approximately 1 mm in height each year due to the pressure of the underlying salt dome.

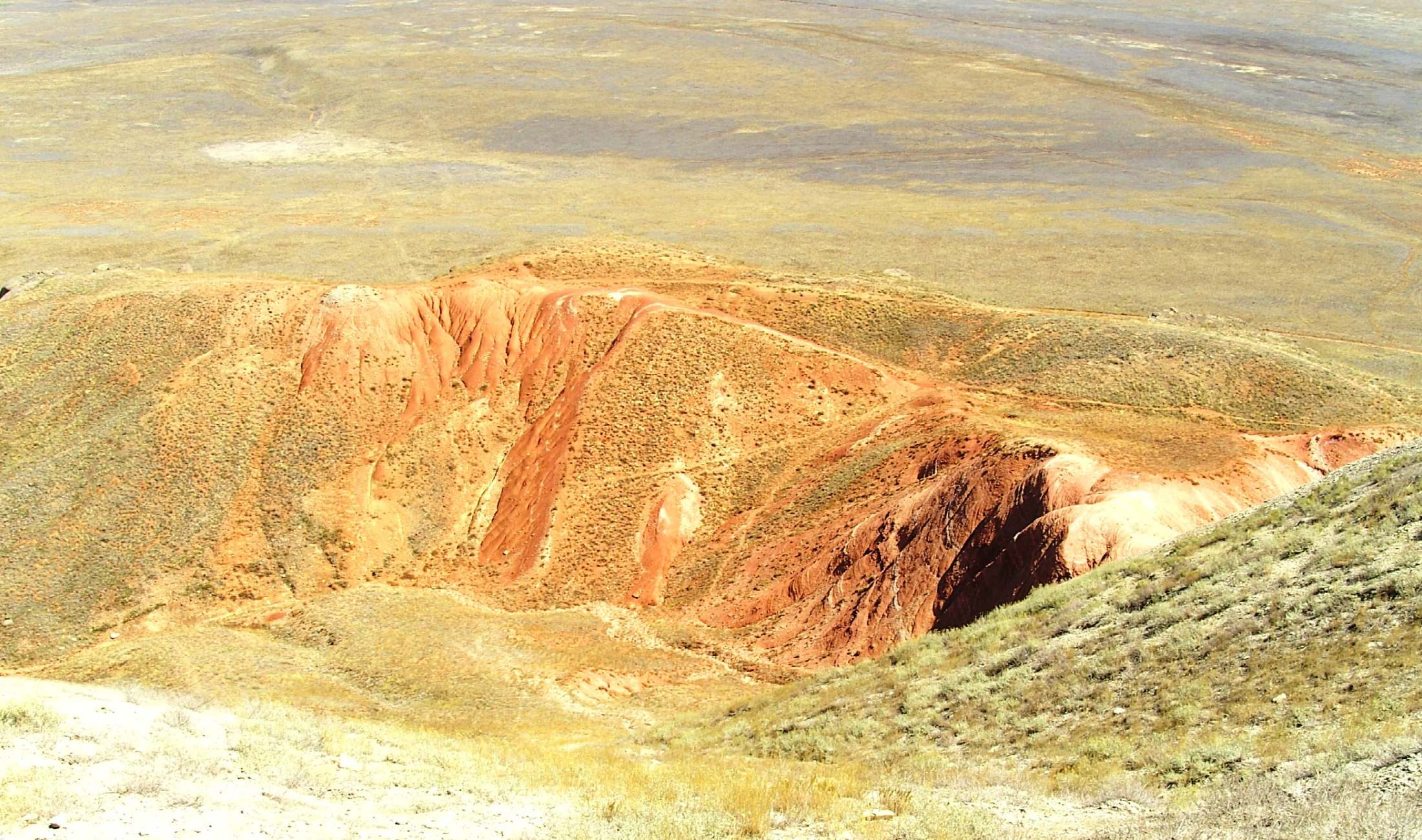
Red Rocks at the foot of Bolshoye Bogdo (Big Bogdo) Mountain

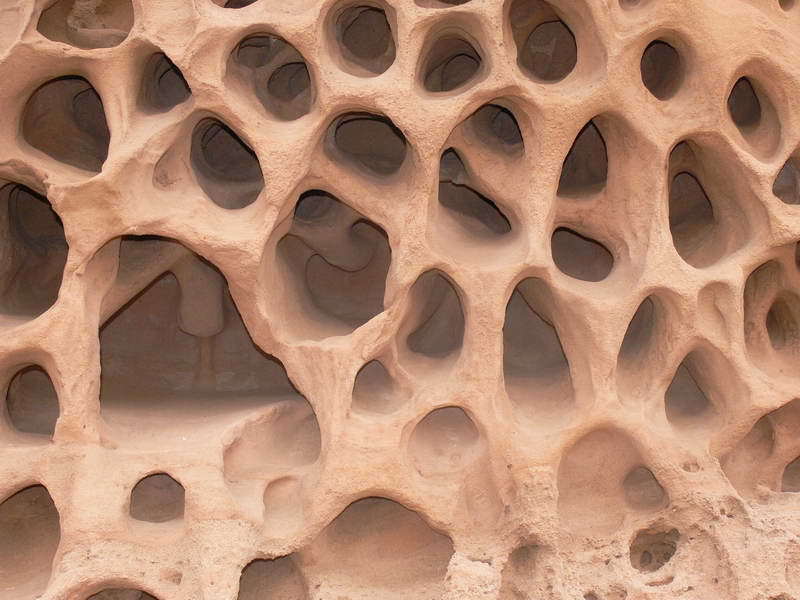
"Singing Rock"; air flow over limestone formations causes unusual sounds

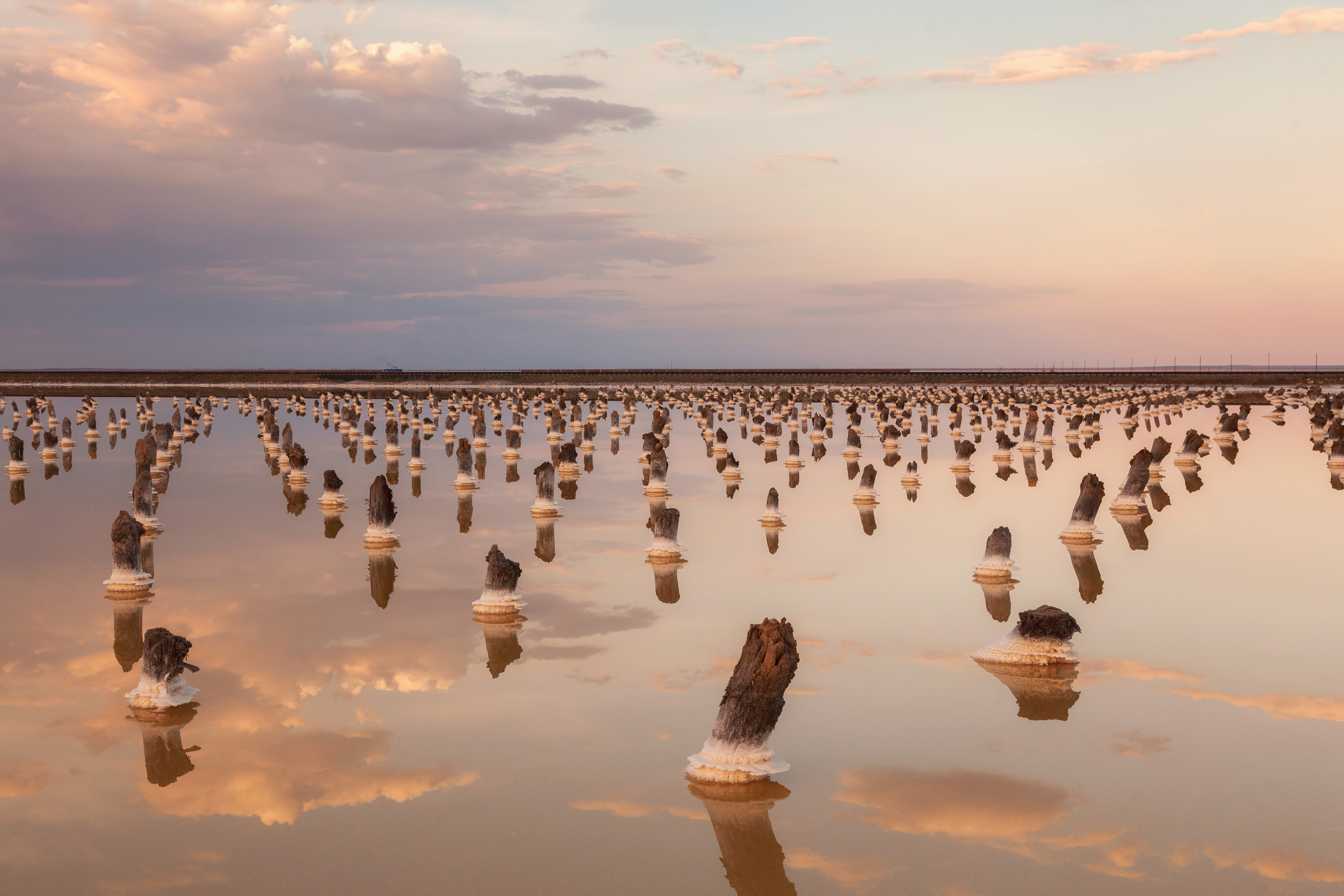
Wooden pillars at Lake Baskunchak – a net attached to the pillars was lowered into the very salty water, after that raised and the salt crystallized

It is also classified as a geoheritage site because it contains a unique concentration of significant geological features, spanning stratigraphic, paleontological, and tectonic importance a geoheritage site.

== Climate and ecoregion ==
Bogdinsko-Baskunchakski is located in the northwest of the Caspian lowland desert ecoregion. This region, on the north and northeast shores of the Caspian Sea, is characterized by sand dunes and ridges, salt soil, clay deserts (takyrs), and in places solonchaks (shors) or salt pans of 30–40 cm thickness devoid of vegetation. The sedimentary landscape is recently exposed lake bed (during the Tertiary the Caspian Basin was connected across the Black Sea to the Mediterranean.)

The climate of Bogdinsko-Baskunchakski is Humid continental climate, cool summer (Köppen climate classification (Dwb)). This climate is characterized by high variation in temperature, both daily and seasonally; with dry winters and cool summers. Average annual temperature is 15.4 C. Annual precipitation averages 150 mm.

== Flora and fauna ==
=== Animals ===
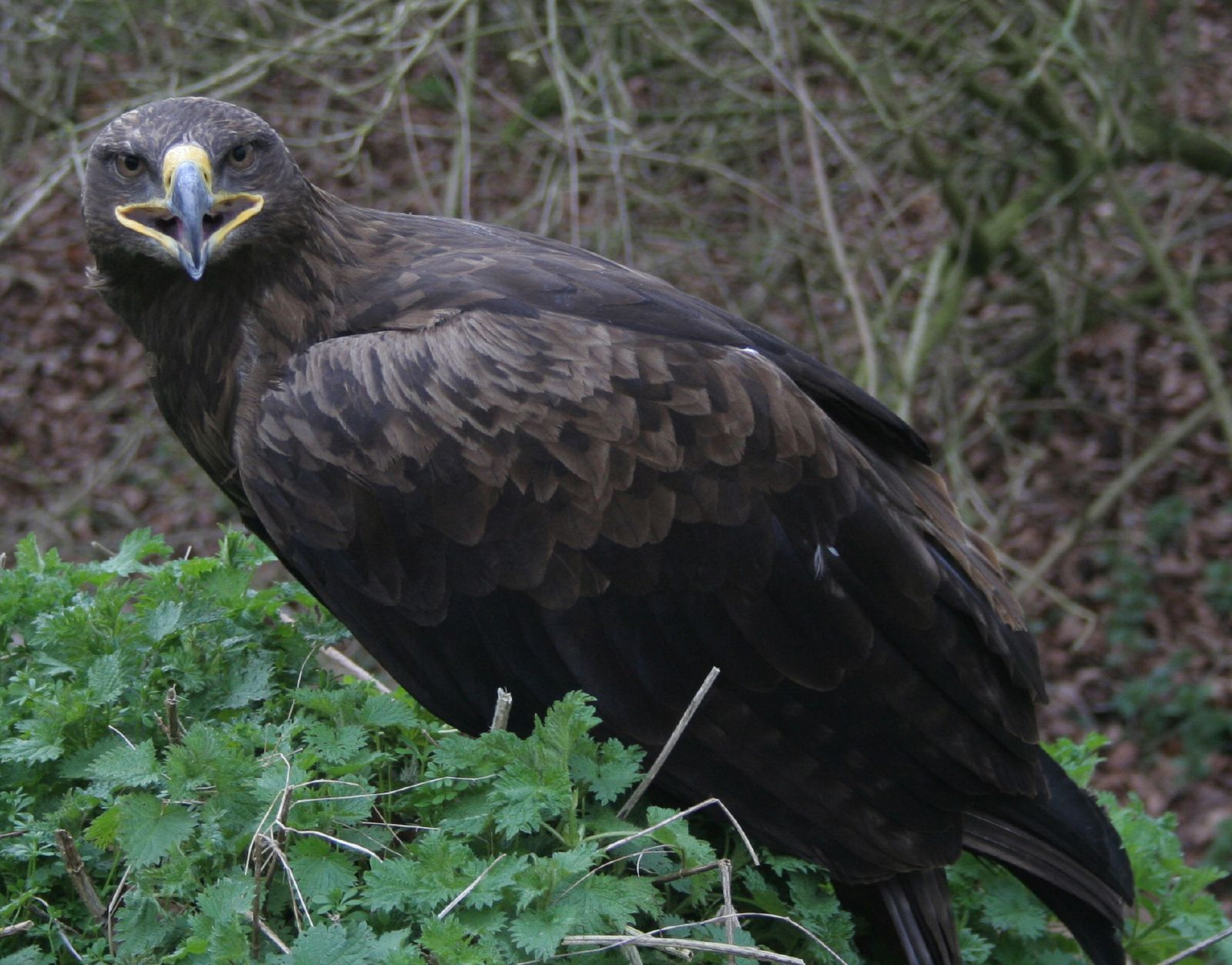
The endangered Russian Steppe eagle

==== Birds ====
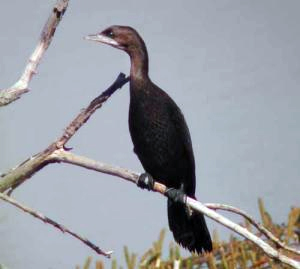
Pygmy cormorant

Bogdo-Baskunchak Nature Reserve is also a site for many varieties ofeagles, such as the Golden eagle, the Tawny eagle, the White-tailed eagle and the endangered Russian Steppe eagle. Other birds of prey are the Saker falcon, the Common kestrel, the Eurasian hobby and the Red-footed falcon. Demoiselle cranes are among the migrating birds and come back every spring to mate, nest, bring up their chicks and leave again for the winter. Some of the water birds are the Black-winged stilt, the Pygmy cormorant and the Pied avocet.

==== Mammals ====
The natural reserve is among the last places where the endangered Saiga antelopes hope to recover from being hunted close to their extinction. There are several carnivorous hunters, including the Wolf, the Red fox, the Corsac fox and the Golden jackal. Among the smaller predators are the African wildcat, the Marbled polecat, the Stoat and the Steppe polecat.

Numerous Rodents serve as prey for the hunters, among them are various ground squirrels (Spermophilus), meriones (such as Meriones tamariscinus and Meriones meridianus), jerboas (Allactaga major and Allactaga elater), hamsters (Cricetus cricetus and Cricetulus migratorius), as well as some mice.

==== Reptiles ====
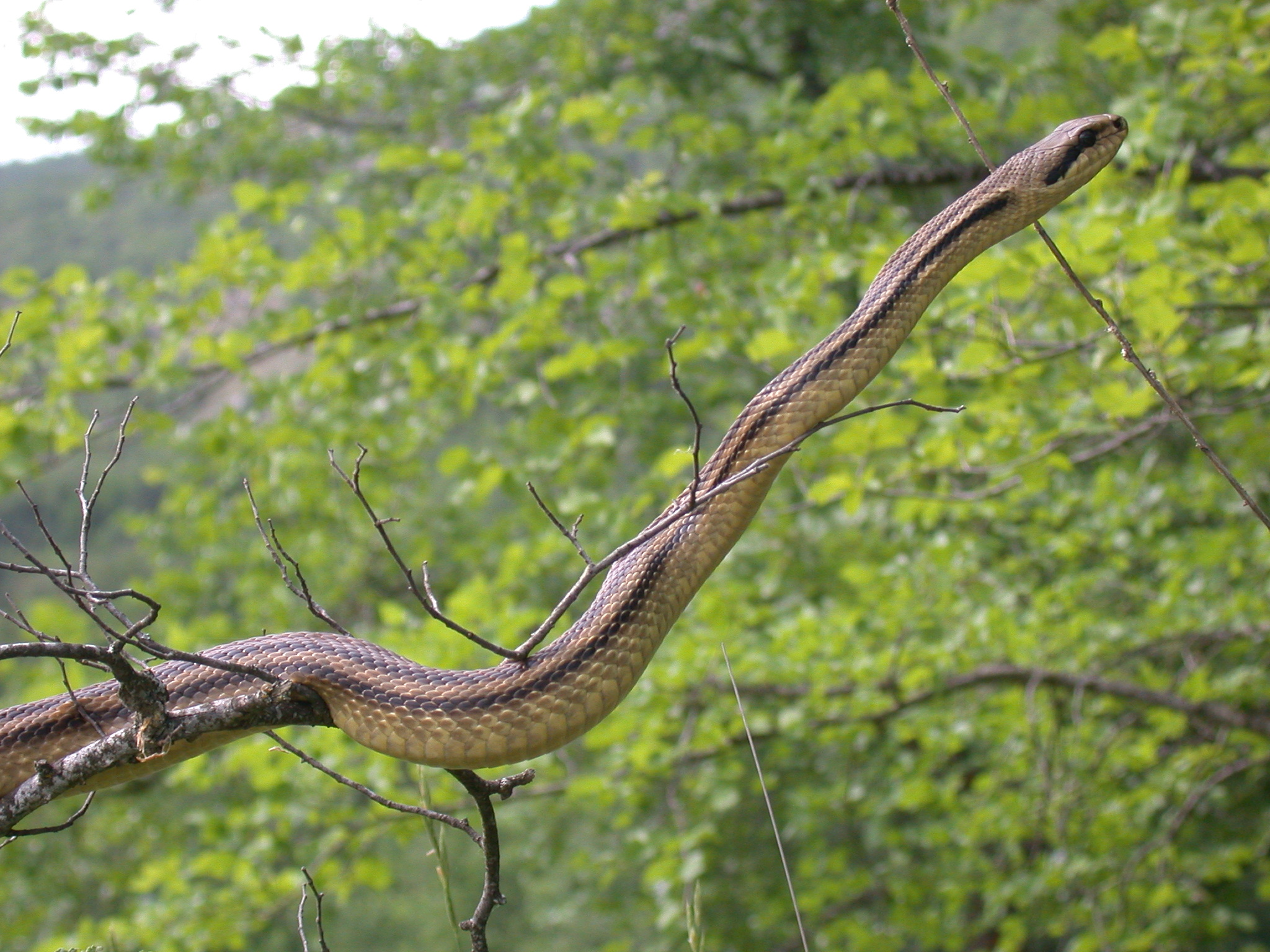
four-lined snake Elaphe quatuorlineata

Big Bogdo Mountain is the only habitat in Russia of the squeaky gecko Alsophylax pipiens. The other reptiles include the spotted toadhead agama, the steppe-runner and the lizard Eremias velox, as well as various snakes, including the black whipsnake and the four-lined snake.

=== Plants ===
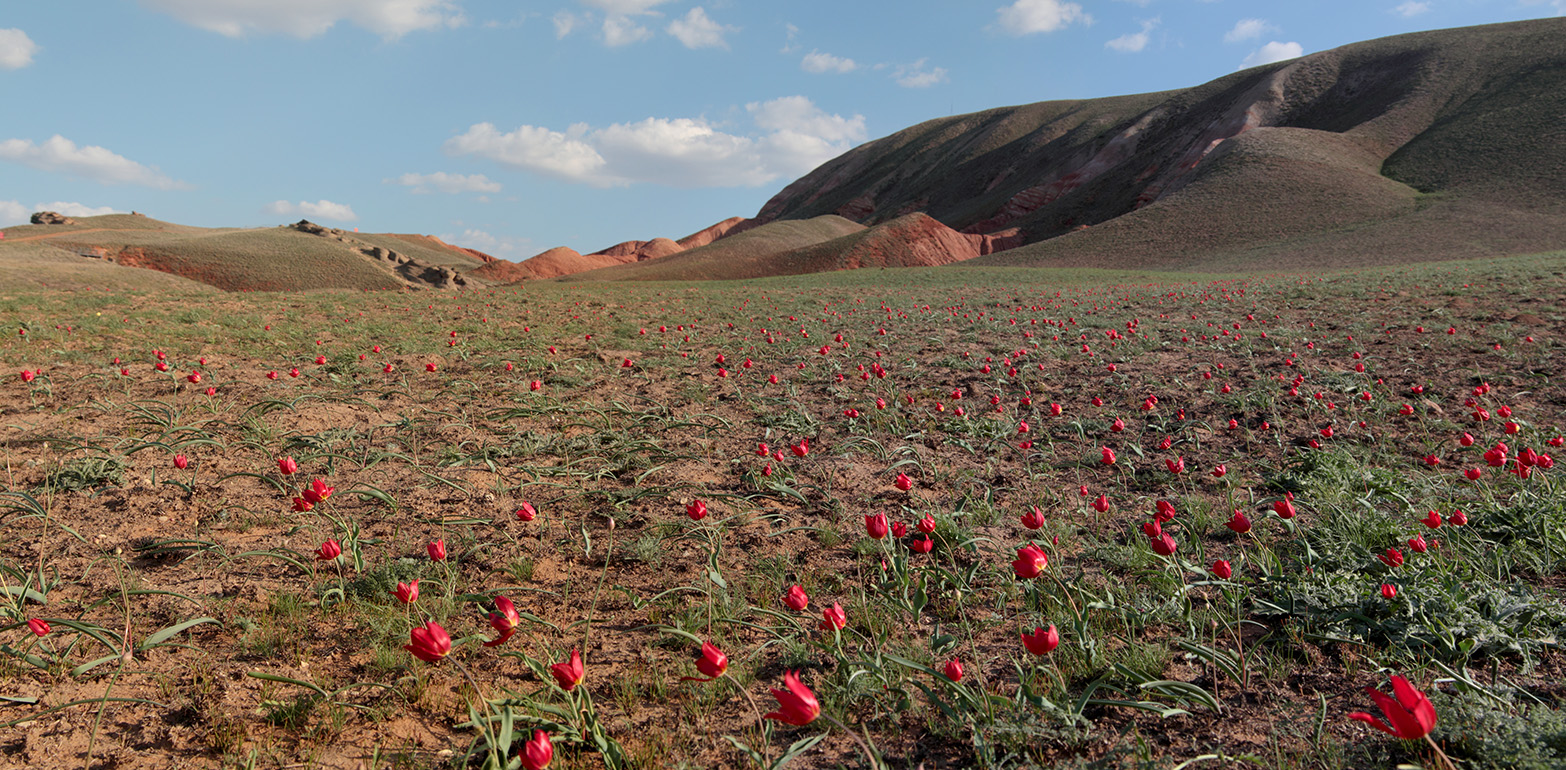
Wild garden tulips (tulipa gesneriana) in bloom at the slopes of Bogdo Mountain

Due to heat and lack of moisture, plant life is sparse but features highly specialized halophytes (salt-tolerant plants).

The garden tulip usually blooms for less than a week, after some rain fell.

== Ecotourism ==
Big Bogdo mountain is considered a sacred site by some Buddhists, and there is one trail open to visitors - a 2.5 km hike to Big Bogdo ("Trail Legends of the Holy Mountain") with an observation deck and informational placards. There is also driving tour escorted by reserve officers to the shore of the lake. Passes must be obtained from the reserve office in Akhtubinsk. As a strict nature reserve in a sensitive environment, however, most of the Reserve is closed to the general public and access is strictly guarded by patrols. Scientists and those with 'environmental education' purposes can make arrangements with reserve management for visits.

== See also ==
- List of Russian Nature Reserves (class 1a 'zapovedniks')
