= Samosdelka (selo) =

Samosdelka Самосделка
- Selo
- Location within Astrakhan Oblast Location within Russia
- Coordinates: 46°01′N 47°50′E
- Country: Russia
- Region: Astrakhan Oblast
- District: Kamyzyaksky District
- Time zone: UTC+4:00

Samosdelka (Russian: Самосделка) is a rural locality (a selo) and the administrative center of Samosdelsky Selsoviet, Kamyzyaksky District, Astrakhan Oblast, Russia. The population was 1,240 as of 2010. There are 14 streets.

== Geography ==
Samosdelka is located 34 km southwest of Kamyzyak (the district's administrative centre) by road. Forpost is the nearest rural locality.
