= Verkhnekalinovsky =

Verkhnekalinovsky Верхнекалиновский
- Settlement
- Location within Astrakhan Oblast Location within Russia
- Coordinates: 46°01′N 48°07′E
- Country: Russia
- Region: Astrakhan Oblast
- District: Kamyzyaksky District
- Time zone: UTC+4:00

Verkhnekalinovsky (Russian: Верхнекалиновский) is a rural locality (a settlement) and the administrative center of Verkhnekalinovsky Selsoviet, Kamyzyaksky District, Astrakhan Oblast, Russia. The population was 1,331 as of 2010. There are 11 streets.

== Geography ==
Verkhnekalinovsky is located 14 km south of Kamyzyak (the district's administrative centre) by road. Zhan-Aul is the nearest rural locality.
