= Kamnev =

Kamnev Камнев
- Khutor
- Location within Astrakhan Oblast Location within Russia
- Coordinates: 48°29′N 45°27′E
- Country: Russia
- Region: Astrakhan Oblast
- District: Akhtubinsky District
- Time zone: UTC+4:00

Kamnev (Russian: Камнев) is a rural locality (a khutor) in Kapustinoyarsky Selsoviet of Akhtubinsky District, Astrakhan Oblast, Russia. The population was 43 as of 2010. There is 1 street.

== Geography ==
Kamnev is located 78 km northwest of Akhtubinsk (the district's administrative centre) by road. Grachi is the nearest rural locality.
