= Udachnoye, Astrakhan Oblast =

Udachnoye Удачное
- Selo
- Location within Astrakhan Oblast Location within Russia
- Coordinates: 47°44′N 46°47′E
- Country: Russia
- Region: Astrakhan Oblast
- District: Akhtubinsky District
- Time zone: UTC+4:00

Udachnoye (Russian: Удачное) is a rural locality (a selo) and the administrative center of Udachensky Selsoviet of Akhtubinsky District, Astrakhan Oblast, Russia. The population was 681 as of 2010. There are 12 streets.

== Geography ==
Udachnoye is located 86 km southeast of Akhtubinsk (the district's administrative centre) by road. Verblyuzhy is the nearest rural locality.
