= Chernoyarsky =

Chernoyarsky (masculine), Chernoyarskaya (feminine), or Chernoyarskoye (neuter) may refer to:

- Chernoyarsky District, a district of Astrakhan Oblast, Russia
- Chernoyarsky (rural locality) (Chernoyarskaya, Chernoyarskoye), name of several rural localities in Russia
