= Moryakov =

Moryakov Моряков
- Settlement
- Location within Astrakhan Oblast Location within Russia
- Coordinates: 46°09′N 47°55′E
- Country: Russia
- Region: Astrakhan Oblast
- District: Kamyzyaksky District
- Time zone: UTC+4:00

Moryakov (Russian: Моряков) is a rural locality (a settlement) and the administrative center of Nikolo-Komarovsky Selsoviet, Kamyzyaksky District, Astrakhan Oblast, Russia. The population was 255 as of 2010.

== Geography ==
Moryakov is located 35 km northwest of Kamyzyak (the district's administrative centre) by road. Nikolskoye is the nearest rural locality.
