= Barany Bugor =

Barany Bugor Бараний Бугор
- Selo
- Location within Astrakhan Oblast Location within Russia
- Coordinates: 46°10′N 48°18′E
- Country: Russia
- Region: Astrakhan Oblast
- District: Kamyzyaksky District
- Time zone: UTC+4:00

Barany Bugor (Russian: Бараний Бугор) is a rural locality (a selo) in Semibugrinsky Selsoviet, Kamyzyaksky District, Astrakhan Oblast, Russia. The population was 225 as of 2010. There are 3 streets.

== Geography ==
Barany Bugor is located on the Bolda River, 35 km northeast of Kamyzyak (the district's administrative centre) by road. Semibugry is the nearest rural locality.
