= Karaulnoye =

Karaulnoye Караульное
- Selo
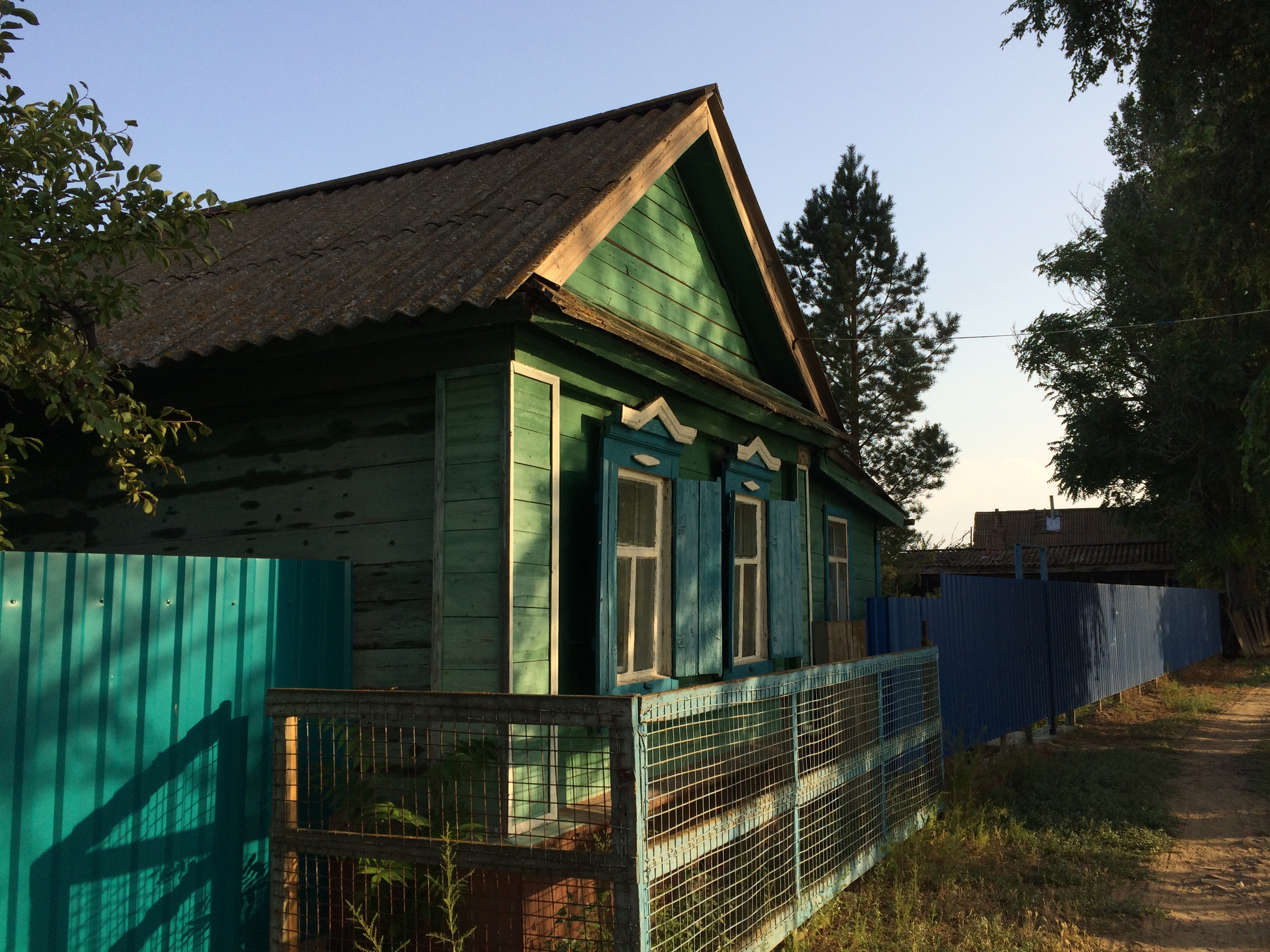
- Lenina Street in Karaulnoye

- Location within Astrakhan Oblast Location within Russia
- Coordinates: 45°52′N 48°07′E
- Country: Russia
- Region: Astrakhan Oblast
- District: Kamyzyaksky District
- Time zone: UTC+4:00

Karaulnoye (Russian: Караульное) is a rural locality (a selo) and the administrative center of Karaulinsky Selsoviet, Kamyzyaksky District, Astrakhan Oblast, Russia. The population was 810 as of 2010. There are 8 streets.

== Geography ==
Karaulnoye is located 32 km south of Kamyzyak (the district's administrative centre) by road. Kirovsky is the nearest rural locality.
