= Zastenka =

Zastenka Застенка
- Selo
- Location within Astrakhan Oblast Location within Russia
- Coordinates: 46°05′N 48°12′E
- Country: Russia
- Region: Astrakhan Oblast
- District: Kamyzyaksky District
- Time zone: UTC+4:00

Zastenka (Russian: Застенка) is a rural locality (a selo) in Razdorsky Selsoviet, Kamyzyaksky District, Astrakhan Oblast, Russia. The population was 494 as of 2010. There are three streets.

== Geography ==
Zastenka is located 15 km southeast of Kamyzyak (the district's administrative centre) by road. Razdor is the nearest rural locality.
