= Pirogovka =

Pirogovka Пироговка
- Selo
- Location within Astrakhan Oblast Location within Russia
- Coordinates: 47°52′N 46°38′E
- Country: Russia
- Region: Astrakhan Oblast
- District: Akhtubinsky District
- Time zone: UTC+4:00

Pirogovka (Russian: Пироговка) is a rural locality (a selo) in Akhtubinsky District, Astrakhan Oblast, Russia. The population was 816 as of 2010.

== Geography ==
Pirogovka is located 67 km southeast of Akhtubinsk (the district's administrative centre) by road. Sokrutovka is the nearest rural locality.
