= Kaspy =

Kaspy Каспий
- Settlement
- Location within Astrakhan Oblast Location within Russia
- Coordinates: 46°03′N 48°21′E
- Country: Russia
- Region: Astrakhan Oblast
- District: Kamyzyaksky District
- Time zone: UTC+4:00

Kaspy (Russian: Каспий) is a rural locality (a settlement) in Razdorsky Selsoviet, Kamyzyaksky District, Astrakhan Oblast, Russia. The population was 310 as of 2010. There are 3 streets.

== Geography ==
Kaspy is located 35 km southeast of Kamyzyak (the district's administrative centre) by road. Sizova Griva is the nearest rural locality.
