= Klochkov =

Klochkov Клочков
- Khutor
- Location within Astrakhan Oblast Location within Russia
- Coordinates: 48°24′N 45°52′E
- Country: Russia
- Region: Astrakhan Oblast
- District: Akhtubinsky District
- Time zone: UTC+4:00

Klochkov (Russian: Клочков) is a rural locality (a khutor) in Pologozaymishchensky Selsoviet of Akhtubinsky District, Astrakhan Oblast, Russia. The population was 12 as of 2010. There is 1 street.

== Geography ==
Klochkov is located 42 km northwest of Akhtubinsk (the district's administrative centre) by road. Pologoye Zaymishche is the nearest rural locality.
