= Rogozin, Astrakhan Oblast =

Rogozin Рогозин
- Khutor
- Location within Astrakhan Oblast Location within Russia
- Coordinates: 48°26′N 45°49′E
- Country: Russia
- Region: Astrakhan Oblast
- District: Akhtubinsky District
- Time zone: UTC+4:00

Rogozin (Russian: Рогозин) is a rural locality (a khutor) in Pologozaymishchensky Selsoviet of Akhtubinsky District, Astrakhan Oblast, Russia. The population was 29 as of 2010. There is one street.

== Geography ==
Rogozin is located 65 km northwest of Akhtubinsk (the district's administrative centre) by road. Dubovy is the nearest rural locality.
