= Martovsky =

Martovsky Мартовский
- Passing loop
- Location within Astrakhan Oblast Location within Russia
- Coordinates: 48°07′N 46°45′E
- Country: Russia
- Region: Astrakhan Oblast
- District: Akhtubinsky District
- Time zone: UTC+4:00

Martovsky (Russian: Мартовский) is a rural locality (a passing loop) in "Posyolok Verkhny Baskunchak" of Akhtubinsky District, Astrakhan Oblast, Russia. The population was 12 as of 2010.

== Geography ==
Martovsky is located 60 km southeast of Akhtubinsk (the district's administrative centre) by road. Verkhny Baskunchak is the nearest rural locality.
