= Kachkarinsky =

Kachkarinsky Качкаринский
- Settlement
- Location within Astrakhan Oblast Location within Russia
- Coordinates: 46°00′N 47°57′E
- Country: Russia
- Region: Astrakhan Oblast
- District: Kamyzyaksky District
- Time zone: UTC+4:00

Kachkarinsky (Russian: Качкаринский) is a rural locality (a settlement) in Samosdelsky Selsoviet, Kamyzyaksky District, Astrakhan Oblast, Russia. The population was 177 as of 2010. There is 1 street.

== Geography ==
Kachkarinsky is located 45 km southwest of Kamyzyak (the district's administrative centre) by road. Obrastsovo-Travino is the nearest rural locality.
