= Razdor =

Razdor (Russian: Раздор) is the name of several rural localities in Russia:

- Razdor, Volodarsky District, Astrakhan Oblast, a village in Volodarsky District, Astrakhan Oblast
- Razdor, Kamyzyaksky District, Astrakhan Oblast, a village in Kamyzyaksky District, Astrakhan Oblast
