= Duyunov =

Duyunov Дуюнов
- Khutor
- Location within Astrakhan Oblast Location within Russia
- Coordinates: 48°24′N 45°42′E
- Country: Russia
- Region: Astrakhan Oblast
- District: Akhtubinsky District
- Time zone: UTC+4:00

Duyunov (Russian: Дуюнов) is a rural locality (a khutor) in Kapustinoyarsky Selsoviet of Akhtubinsky District, Astrakhan Oblast, Russia. The population was 7 as of 2010. There is 1 street.

== Geography ==
Duyunov is located 69 km (43 mi) northwest of Akhtubinsk (the district's administrative centre) by road. Korochin is the nearest rural locality.
