= Zolotukha =

Zolotukha Золотуха
- Selo
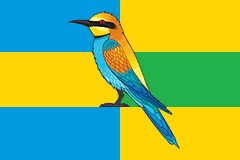
- Flag

- Location within Astrakhan Oblast Location within Russia
- Coordinates: 47°48′N 46°43′E
- Country: Russia
- Region: Astrakhan Oblast
- District: Akhtubinsky District
- Time zone: UTC+4:00

Zolotukha (Russian: Золотуха) is a rural locality (a selo) in Zolotukhinsky Selsoviet of Akhtubinsky District, Astrakhan Oblast, Russia. The population was 1,462 as of 2010. There are 22 streets.

== Geography ==
Zolotukha is located 77 km southeast of Akhtubinsk (the district's administrative centre) by road. Udachnoye is the nearest rural locality.
