= Revin Khutor =

Revin Khutor Ревин Хутор
- Settlement
- Location within Astrakhan Oblast Location within Russia
- Coordinates: 46°00′N 48°15′E
- Country: Russia
- Region: Astrakhan Oblast
- District: Kamyzyaksky District
- Time zone: UTC+4:00

Revin Khutor (Russian: Ревин Хутор) is a rural locality (a settlement) in Razdorsky Selsoviet, Kamyzyaksky District, Astrakhan Oblast, Russia. The population was 34 as of 2010. There is 1 street.

== Geography ==
Revin Khutor is located 28 km southeast of Kamyzyak (the district's administrative centre) by road. Chapayevo is the nearest rural locality.
