= Bogdo =

Bogdo Богдо
- Settlement
- Location within Astrakhan Oblast Location within Russia
- Coordinates: 47°58′N 46°48′E
- Country: Russia
- Region: Astrakhan Oblast
- District: Akhtubinsky District
- Time zone: UTC+4:00

Bogdo (Russian: Богдо) is a rural locality (a settlement) in Sokrutovsky Selsoviet of Akhtubinsky District, Astrakhan Oblast, Russia. The population was 44 as of 2010. There is 1 street.

== Geography ==
Bogdo is located 75 km (47 mi) southeast of Akhtubinsk (the district's administrative centre) by road. Pirogovka is the nearest rural locality.
