= Zelyony Sad =

Zelyony Sad (Russian: Зелёный Сад) is the name of several rural localities in Russia:

- Zelyony Sad, Akhtubinsky District, Astrakhan Oblast, a settlement in Akhtubinsky District, Astrakhan Oblast
- Zelyony Sad, Chernoyarsky District, Astrakhan Oblast, a settlement in Chernoyarsky District, Astrakhan Oblast
