= Lopin =

Lopin Лопин
- Khutor
- Location within Astrakhan Oblast Location within Russia
- Coordinates: 48°30′N 45°24′E
- Country: Russia
- Region: Astrakhan Oblast
- District: Akhtubinsky District
- Time zone: UTC+4:00

Lopin (Russian: Лопин) is a rural locality (a khutor) in Kapustinoyarsky Selsoviet of Akhtubinsky District, Astrakhan Oblast, Russia. The population was 67 as of 2010. There is 1 street.

== Geography ==
Lopin is located 83 km northwest of Akhtubinsk (the district's administrative centre) by road. Kamnev is the nearest rural locality.
