= Novinsky, Astrakhan Oblast =

Novinsky Новинский
- Settlement
- Location within Astrakhan Oblast Location within Russia
- Coordinates: 45°51′N 48°08′E
- Country: Russia
- Region: Astrakhan Oblast
- District: Kamyzyaksky District
- Time zone: UTC+4:00

Novinsky (Russian: Новинский) is a rural locality (a settlement) in Karaulinsky Selsoviet, Kamyzyaksky District, Astrakhan Oblast, Russia. The population was 245 as of 2010. There is 1 street.

== Geography ==
Novinsky is located 34 km south of Kamyzyak (the district's administrative centre) by road. Karaulnoye is the nearest rural locality.
