= Nizhnenikolsky =

Nizhnenikolsky Нижненикольский
- Settlement
- Location within Astrakhan Oblast Location within Russia
- Coordinates: 45°55′N 47°59′E
- Country: Russia
- Region: Astrakhan Oblast
- District: Kamyzyaksky District
- Time zone: UTC+4:00

Nizhnenikolsky (Russian: Нижненикольский) is a rural locality (a settlement) in Obrastsovo-Travinsky Selsoviet, Kamyzyaksky District, Astrakhan Oblast, Russia. The population was 282 as of 2010. There are 3 streets.

== Geography ==
Nizhnenikolsky is located 32 km south of Kamyzyak (the district's administrative centre) by road. Obrastsovo-Travino is the nearest rural locality.
