= Kamenny Yar =

Kamenny Yar Каменный Яр
- Selo
- Location within Astrakhan Oblast Location within Russia
- Coordinates: 48°26′N 45°33′E
- Country: Russia
- Region: Astrakhan Oblast
- District: Chernoyarsky District
- Time zone: UTC+4:00

Kamenny Yar (Russian: Каменный Яр) is a rural locality (a selo) and the administrative center of Kamennoyarsky Selsoviet, Chernoyarsky District, Astrakhan Oblast, Russia. The population was 988 as of 2010. There are 35 streets.

== Geography ==
Kamenny Yar is located on the Volga River, 71 km northwest of Chyorny Yar (the district's administrative centre) by road. Razdolny is the nearest rural locality.
