= Shunguli =

Shunguli Шунгули
- Settlement
- Location within Astrakhan Oblast Location within Russia
- Coordinates: 48°17′N 46°43′E
- Country: Russia
- Region: Astrakhan Oblast
- District: Akhtubinsky District
- Time zone: UTC+4:00

Shunguli (Russian: Шунгули) is a rural locality (a settlement) in "Posyolok Verkhny Baskunchak" of Akhtubinsky District, Astrakhan Oblast, Russia. The population was 20 as of 2010.

== Geography ==
Shunguli is located 47 km east of Akhtubinsk (the district's administrative centre) by road. Verkhny Baskunchak is the nearest rural locality.
