= Pologoye Zaymishche =

Pologoye Zaymishche Пологое Займище
- Selo
- Location within Astrakhan Oblast Location within Russia
- Coordinates: 48°28′N 45°57′E
- Country: Russia
- Region: Astrakhan Oblast
- District: Akhtubinsky District
- Time zone: UTC+4:00

Pologoye Zaymishche (Russian: Пологое Займище) is a rural locality (a selo) and the administrative center of Pokrovsky Selsoviet of Akhtubinsky District, Astrakhan Oblast, Russia. The population was 1,035 as of 2010. There are 37 streets.

== Geography ==
Pologoye Zaymishche is located 29 km northwest of Akhtubinsk (the district's administrative centre) by road. Solyanka is the nearest rural locality.
