= Verblyuzhy =

Verblyuzhy Верблюжий
- Settlement
- Location within Astrakhan Oblast Location within Russia
- Coordinates: 47°43′N 46°52′E
- Country: Russia
- Region: Astrakhan Oblast
- District: Akhtubinsky District
- Time zone: UTC+4:00

Verblyuzhy (Russian: Верблюжий) is a rural locality (a settlement) in Udachensky Selsoviet of Akhtubinsky District, Astrakhan Oblast, Russia. The population was 269 as of 2010. There are 5 streets.

== Geography ==
Verblyuzhy is located 92 km southeast of Akhtubinsk (the district's administrative centre) by road. Udachnoye is the nearest rural locality.
