= Solyonoye Zaymishche =

Solyonoye Zaymishche Солёное Займище
- Selo
- Location within Astrakhan Oblast Location within Russia
- Coordinates: 47°55′N 46°08′E
- Country: Russia
- Region: Astrakhan Oblast
- District: Chernoyarsky District
- Time zone: UTC+4:00

Solyonoye Zaymishche (Russian: Солёное Займище) is a rural locality (a selo) in Chernoyarsky District, Astrakhan Oblast, Russia. The population was 2,257 as of 2010. There are 53 streets.

== Geography ==
Solyonoye Zaymishche is located 19 km south of Chyorny Yar (the district's administrative centre) by road. Grachi is the nearest rural locality.
