= Zelyony Sad, Akhtubinsky District, Astrakhan Oblast =

Zelyony Sad Зелёный Сад
- Settlement
- Location within Astrakhan Oblast Location within Russia
- Coordinates: 48°03′N 46°54′E
- Country: Russia
- Region: Astrakhan Oblast
- District: Akhtubinsky District
- Time zone: UTC+4:00

Zelyony Sad (Russian: Зелёный Сад) is a rural locality (a settlement) in Posyolok Nyzhny Baskunchak, Akhtubinsky District, Astrakhan Oblast, Russia. The population was 4 as of 2010.

== Geography ==
Zelyony Sad is located 72 km southeast of Akhtubinsk (the district's administrative centre) by road. Sredny Baskunchak is the nearest rural locality.
