= Stanya, Astrakhan Oblast =

Stanya Станья
- Settlement
- Location within Astrakhan Oblast Location within Russia
- Coordinates: 45°49′N 48°06′E
- Country: Russia
- Region: Astrakhan Oblast
- District: Kamyzyaksky District
- Time zone: UTC+4:00

Stanya (Russian: Станья) is a rural locality (a settlement) in Karaulinsky Selsoviet, Kamyzyaksky District, Astrakhan Oblast, Russia. The population was 219 as of 2010. There are 3 streets.

== Geography ==
Stanya is located 38 km south of Kamyzyak (the district's administrative centre) by road. Kirovsky is the nearest rural locality.
