= Yamana, Astrakhan Oblast =

Yamana Ямана
- Settlement
- Location within Astrakhan Oblast Location within Russia
- Coordinates: 45°58′N 48°11′E
- Country: Russia
- Region: Astrakhan Oblast
- District: Kamyzyaksky District
- Time zone: UTC+4:00

Yamana (Russian: Ямана) is a rural locality (a settlement) in Verkhnekalinovsky Selsoviet, Kamyzyaksky District, Astrakhan Oblast, Russia. The population was 14 as of 2010. There are 2 streets.

== Geography ==
Yamana is located 24 km south of Kamyzyak (the district's administrative centre) by road. Nizhnekalinovsky is the nearest rural locality.
