= Arshin, Astrakhan Oblast =

Arshin Аршин
- Settlement
- Location within Astrakhan Oblast Location within Russia
- Coordinates: 45°58′N 47°53′E
- Country: Russia
- Region: Astrakhan Oblast
- District: Kamyzyaksky District
- Time zone: UTC+4:00

Arshin (Russian: Аршин) is a rural locality (a settlement) in Samosdelsky Selsoviet, Kamyzyaksky District, Astrakhan Oblast, Russia. The population was 44 as of 2010. There is 1 street.

== Geography ==
Arshin is located 38 km southwest of Kamyzyak (the district's administrative centre) by road. Alexeyevka is the nearest rural locality.
