= Solyonoye =

Solyonoye (Russian: Солёное) may refer to:

- Solyonoye Zaymishche, a settlement in Chernoyarsky District, Astrakhan Oblast, Russia
- Lake Solyonoye (Sladkovsky District), a lake in Tyumen Oblast, Russia
