= Razdor, Kamyzyaksky District, Astrakhan Oblast =

Razdor Раздор
- Selo
- Location within Astrakhan Oblast Location within Russia
- Coordinates: 46°04′N 48°13′E
- Country: Russia
- Region: Astrakhan Oblast
- District: Kamyzyaksky District
- Time zone: UTC+4:00

Razdor (Russian: Раздор) is a rural locality (a selo) and the administrative center of Razdorsky Selsoviet, Kamyzyaksky District, Astrakhan Oblast, Russia. The population was 1,208 as of 2010. There are 17 streets.

== Geography ==
Razdor is located 18 km southeast of Kamyzyak (the district's administrative centre) by road. Zastenka is the nearest rural locality.
