= Yamana =

Yamana may refer to:

- Yamana, Astrakhan Oblast, Russia
- Yamana clan, a Japanese clan
- Yamana Gold, a Canadian-based gold mining company operating in South and Central America
- Yahgan people in Chile and Argentina
- Yahgan language
