= Parygin =

Parygin (masculine) or Parygina (feminine) (Russian: Парыгин, Парыгина) is a Russian surname. Notable people with the surname include:

- Alexander Parygin (born 1973), Kazakhstani-Australian modern pentathlete and Olympic champion
- Alexey Parygin (born 1964), Soviet and Russian artist, philosopher, art historian
- Boris Parygin (1930–2012), Soviet and Russian philosopher, sociologist and one of the founders of social psychology

== See also ==
- Parygino
