= Arshin =

Arshin may refer to:

- Arşın, old Turkish unit of length corresponding to a yard known as aršin among South Slavs
- Arshin (length), old Russian unit of length, similar to Turkish arşın
- Arshin, Astrakhan Oblast, a rural locality in Russia
