= Nizhny Baskunchak =

Urban locality in Astrakhan Oblast, Russia

Coordinates: 48°13′11″N 46°49′56″E

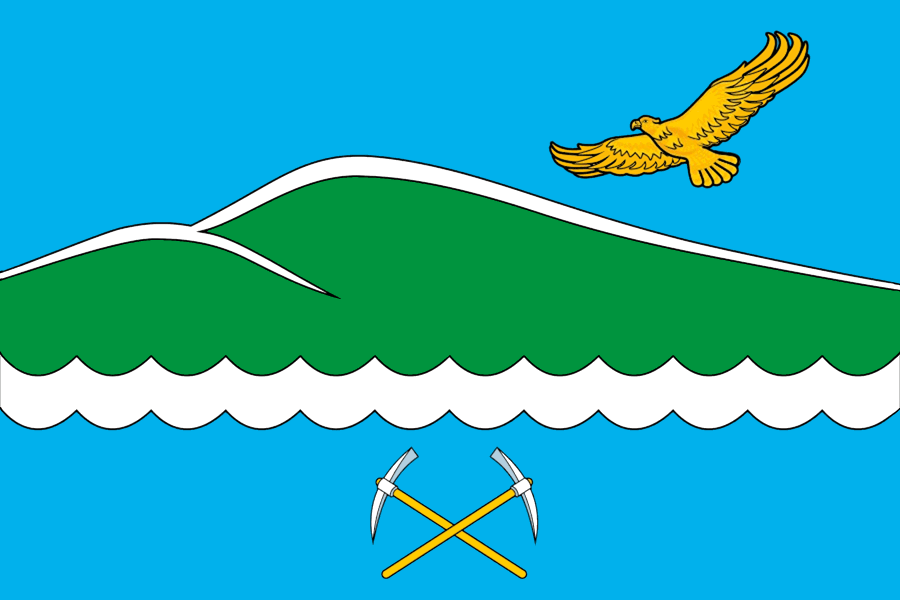
Flag of Nizhny Baskunchak

Nizhny Baskunchak (Russian: Нижний Баскунчак) is an urban-type settlement in Akhtubinsky District of Astrakhan Oblast, Russia. Population: 2,789 (2010 census); 3,167 (2002 census); 3,360 (1989 Soviet census).

The settlement is located on the western shore of Lake Baskunchak.
