= Bolshoy Zyudostinsky Island =

Bolshoy Zyudostinskiy Большой Зюдостинский
- Island
- Location within Caspian Sea
- Coordinates: 45°59′24″N 48°54′28″E
- Country: Russia
- Oblast: Astrakhan Oblast
- District: Kamyzyaksky District

Bolshoy Zyudostinskiy is a large island in the Caspian Sea. It is located off the mouths of the Volga in an area where there are numerous delta islands.

== Geography ==
Bolshoy Zyudostinskiy is separated from the coast to its north by a broad channel.

Administratively, Bolshoy Zyudostinskiy belongs to the Astrakhan Oblast of the Russian Federation.

=== Nearby islands ===
- Malyy Zyudostinskiy (Small Zyudostinskiy) lies close by at 45°58′34″N 48°51′28″E.
