= Zelyony Sad, Chernoyarsky District, Astrakhan Oblast =

Zelyony Sad Зелёный Сад
- Settlement
- Location within Astrakhan Oblast Location within Russia
- Coordinates: 48°24′N 45°16′E
- Country: Russia
- Region: Astrakhan Oblast
- District: Chernoyarsky District
- Time zone: UTC+4:00

Zelyony Sad (Russian: Зелёный Сад) is a rural locality (a settlement) in Solodnikovsky Selsoviet, Chernoyarsky District, Astrakhan Oblast, Russia. The population was 59 as of 2010.

== Geography ==
Zelyony Sad is located 81 km northwest of Chyorny Yar (the district's administrative centre) by road. Solodniki is the nearest rural locality.
