= Stanya =

Stanya may refer to:

- Stanya Kahn (born 1968), American video artist
- Stanya, Astrakhan Oblast, Russia
- Stanya, an Icelandic band led by Þorsteinn Magnússon after leaving Þeyr
