= Parygino =

Parygino Парыгино
- Selo
- Location within Astrakhan Oblast Location within Russia
- Coordinates: 45°56′N 48°14′E
- Country: Russia
- Region: Astrakhan Oblast
- District: Kamyzyaksky District
- Time zone: UTC+4:00

Parygino (Russian: Парыгино) is a rural locality (a selo) in Karalatsky Selsoviet, Kamyzyaksky District, Astrakhan Oblast, Russia. The population was 312 as of 2010. There are 4 streets.

== Geography ==
Parygino is located 34 km southeast of Kamyzyak (the district's administrative centre) by road. Karalat is the nearest rural locality.
