= Volgo-Kaspiysky =

Urban locality in Astrakhan Oblast, Russia

Coordinates: 46°12′09″N 47°55′09″E

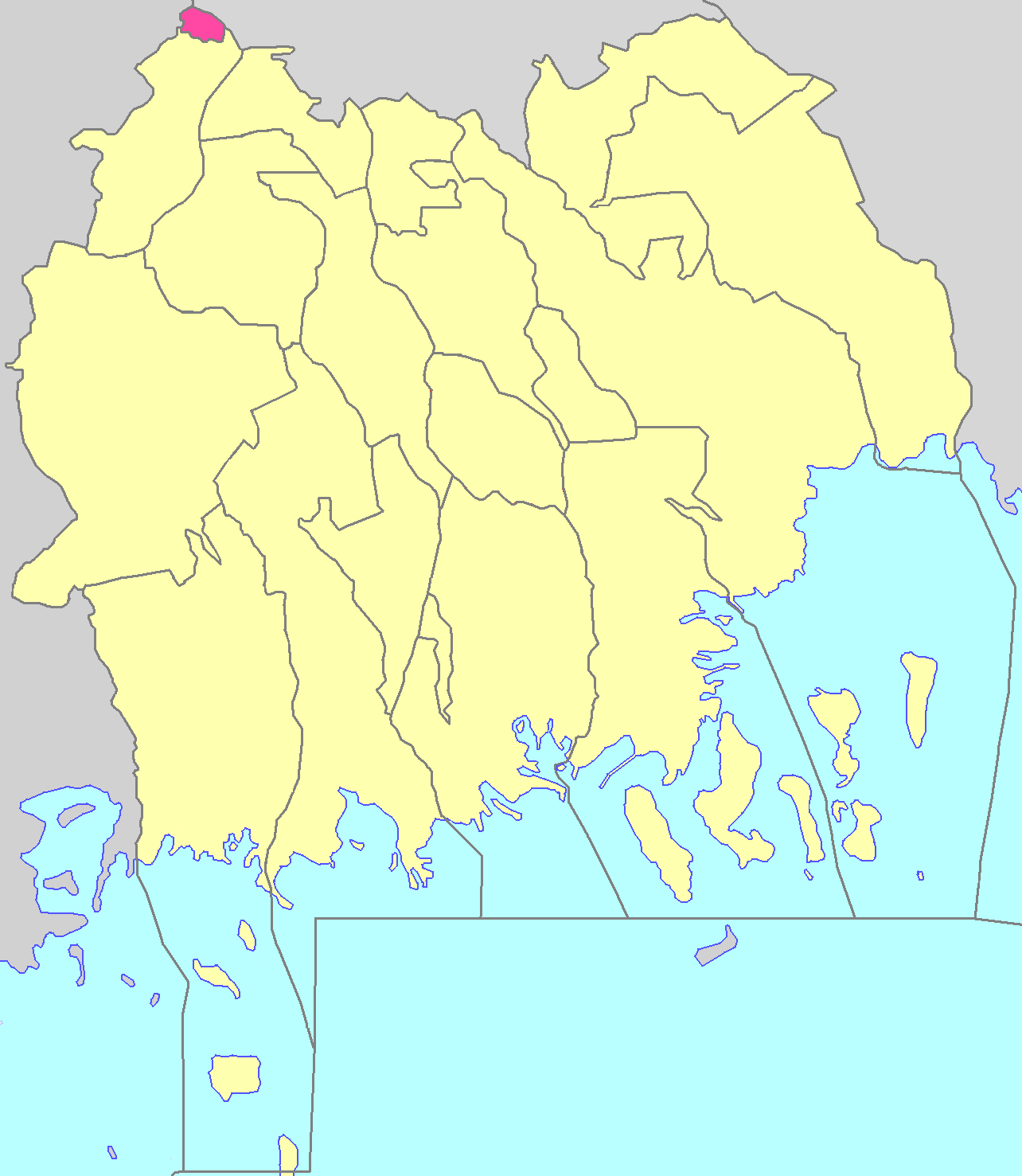
The location of Volgo-Kaspiysky in the Kamyzyaksky District

Volgo-Kaspiysky (Russian: Волго-Каспийский) is an urban-type settlement in Kamyzyaksky District of Astrakhan Oblast, Russia.

== Demographics ==
Population: 2,581 (2010 Census); 2,674 (2002 Census); 3,088 (1989 Soviet census).
