= Kirovsky, Astrakhan Oblast =

Urban locality in Astrakhan Oblast, Russia

Coordinates: 45°50′54″N 48°07′16″E

Kirovsky (Russian: Кировский) is an urban-type settlement in Kamyzyaksky District of Astrakhan Oblast, Russia. Population: 2,249 (2010 census); 2,259 (2002 census); 2,446 (1989 Soviet census).
