= Chernoyarsky (rural locality) =

Chernoyarsky (Russian: Черноя́рский; masculine), Chernoyarskaya (Черноя́рская; feminine), or Chernoyarskoye (Черноя́рское; neuter) is the name of several rural localities in Russia:

- Chernoyarsky, Republic of North Ossetia–Alania, a settlement in Novoosetinsky Rural Okrug of Mozdoksky District of the Republic of North Ossetia–Alania
- Chernoyarsky, Sverdlovsk Oblast, a settlement under the administrative jurisdiction of the City of Serov, Sverdlovsk Oblast
- Chernoyarskaya, a stanitsa in Novoosetinsky Rural Okrug of Mozdoksky District of the Republic of North Ossetia–Alania
