= Ilyinka, Ikryaninsky District, Astrakhan Oblast =

Urban locality in Astrakhan Oblast, Russia

Ilyinka Ильинка
- work settlement
- Interactive map of Ilyinka
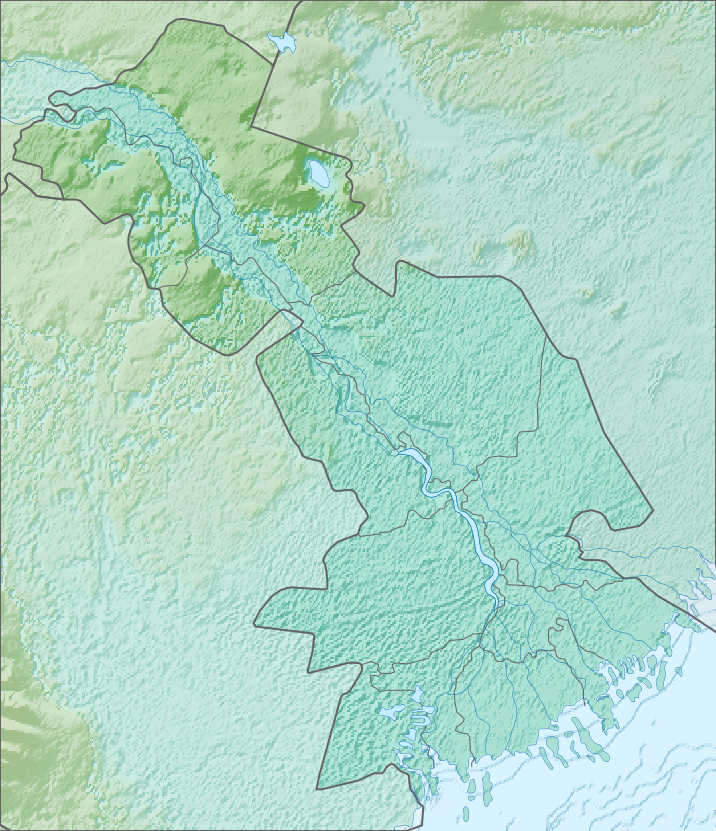
- Location within Astrakhan Oblast Location within Russia
- Coordinates: 46°14′09″N 47°54′04″E
- Country: Russia
- Region: Astrakhan Oblast
- District: Ikryaninsky District
- Time zone: UTC+4:00

Ilyinka (Russian: Ильинка) is an urban locality (work settlement) in Ikryaninsky District of Astrakhan Oblast, Russia. Population: 4,650 (2010 census); 4,633 (2002 census); 4,387 (1989 Soviet census).
