= Verkhny Baskunchak =

Urban locality in Astrakhan Oblast, Russia

Coordinates: 48°13′35″N 46°43′25″E

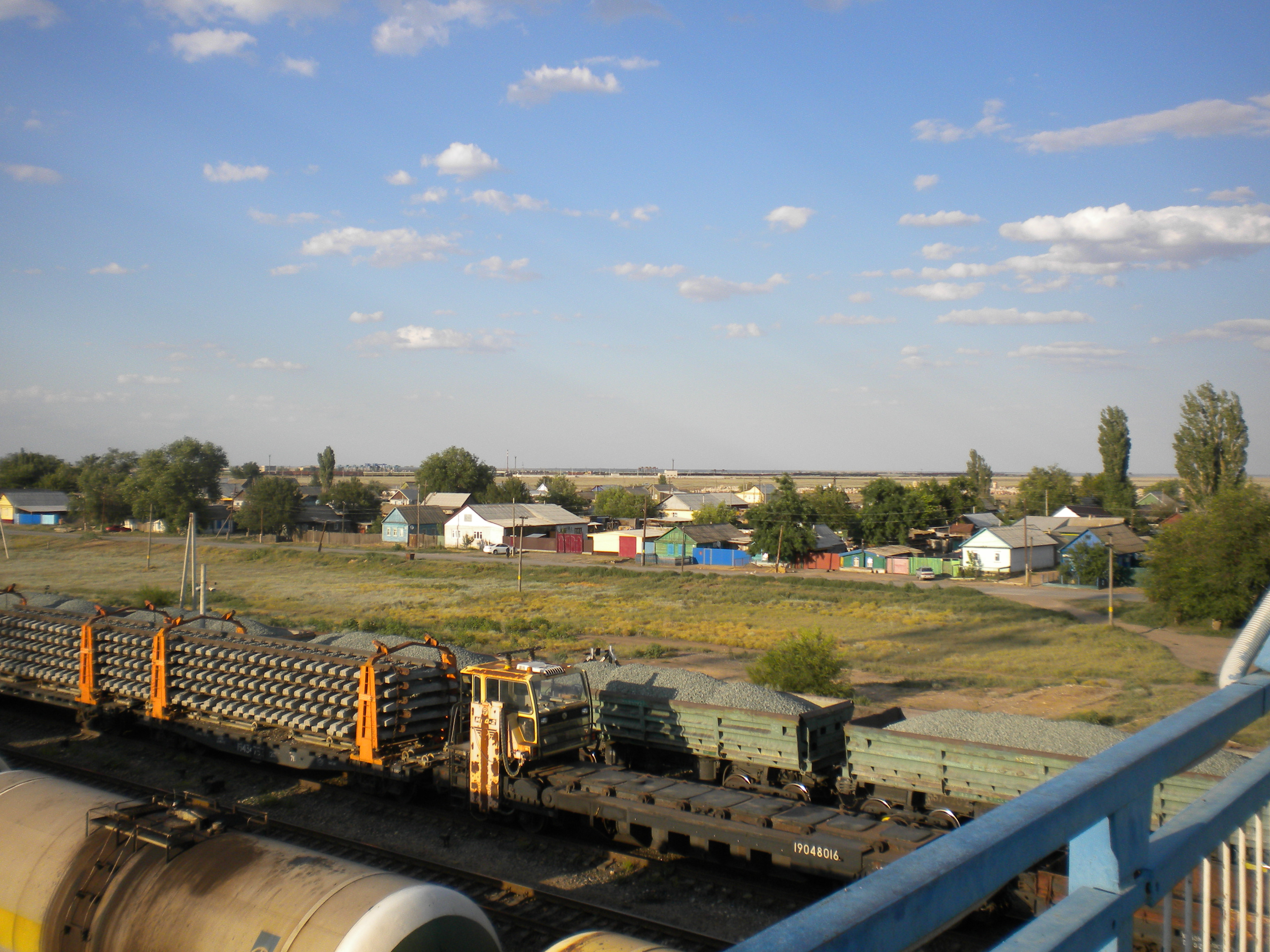
Upper Baskunchak. View of the village from the pedestrian bridge.

Verkhny Baskunchak (Russian: Верхний Баскунчак) is an urban-type settlement in Akhtubinsky District of Astrakhan Oblast, Russia. Population: 8,411 (2010 census); 8,785 (2002 census); 9,685 (1989 Soviet census).

== Climate ==
Climate data for Verkhny Baskunchak (extremes 1936-present)
Month	Jan	Feb	Mar	Apr	May	Jun	Jul	Aug	Sep	Oct	Nov	Dec	Year
Record high °C (°F)	11.0 (51.8)	15.2 (59.4)	25.3 (77.5)	32.9 (91.2)	39.0 (102.2)	41.5 (106.7)	43.6 (110.5)	44.7 (112.5)	40.8 (105.4)	31.0 (87.8)	18.7 (65.7)	11.6 (52.9)	44.7 (112.5)
Mean daily maximum °C (°F)	−2.9 (26.8)	−1.7 (28.9)	6.5 (43.7)	17.0 (62.6)	24.8 (76.6)	30.2 (86.4)	32.6 (90.7)	31.5 (88.7)	24.0 (75.2)	15.0 (59.0)	4.8 (40.6)	−1.4 (29.5)	15.0 (59.1)
Daily mean °C (°F)	−6.1 (21.0)	−5.6 (21.9)	1.5 (34.7)	10.7 (51.3)	18.2 (64.8)	23.6 (74.5)	26.0 (78.8)	24.5 (76.1)	17.3 (63.1)	9.4 (48.9)	0.9 (33.6)	−4.3 (24.3)	9.7 (49.4)
Mean daily minimum °C (°F)	−8.9 (16.0)	−8.8 (16.2)	−2.4 (27.7)	5.0 (41.0)	11.8 (53.2)	16.9 (62.4)	19.2 (66.6)	17.7 (63.9)	11.3 (52.3)	4.8 (40.6)	−2.2 (28.0)	−7.0 (19.4)	4.8 (40.6)
Record low °C (°F)	−33.8 (−28.8)	−36.3 (−33.3)	−27.5 (−17.5)	−15.0 (5.0)	−3.4 (25.9)	1.3 (34.3)	7.5 (45.5)	4.5 (40.1)	−4.2 (24.4)	−14.6 (5.7)	−28.3 (−18.9)	−31.2 (−24.2)	−36.3 (−33.3)
Average precipitation mm (inches)	22.1 (0.87)	20.4 (0.80)	21.8 (0.86)	21.4 (0.84)	27.1 (1.07)	25.5 (1.00)	28.6 (1.13)	12.4 (0.49)	25.0 (0.98)	25.7 (1.01)	20.7 (0.81)	26.0 (1.02)	276.7 (10.88)
Source: pogoda.ru.net
