= Razdor, Volodarsky District, Astrakhan Oblast =

Razdor Раздор
- Selo
- Location within Astrakhan Oblast Location within Russia
- Coordinates: 46°24′N 48°16′E
- Country: Russia
- Region: Astrakhan Oblast
- District: Volodarsky District
- Time zone: UTC+4:00

Razdor (Russian: Раздор) is a rural locality (a selo) in Khutorsky Selsoviet of Volodarsky District, Astrakhan Oblast, Russia. The population was 199 as of 2010. There are 4 streets.

== Geography ==
It is located on the Bely Ilmen River, 22 km (14 mi) west of Volodarsky (the district's administrative centre) by road. Bely Ilmen is the nearest rural locality.
