= Kamyzyak (river) =

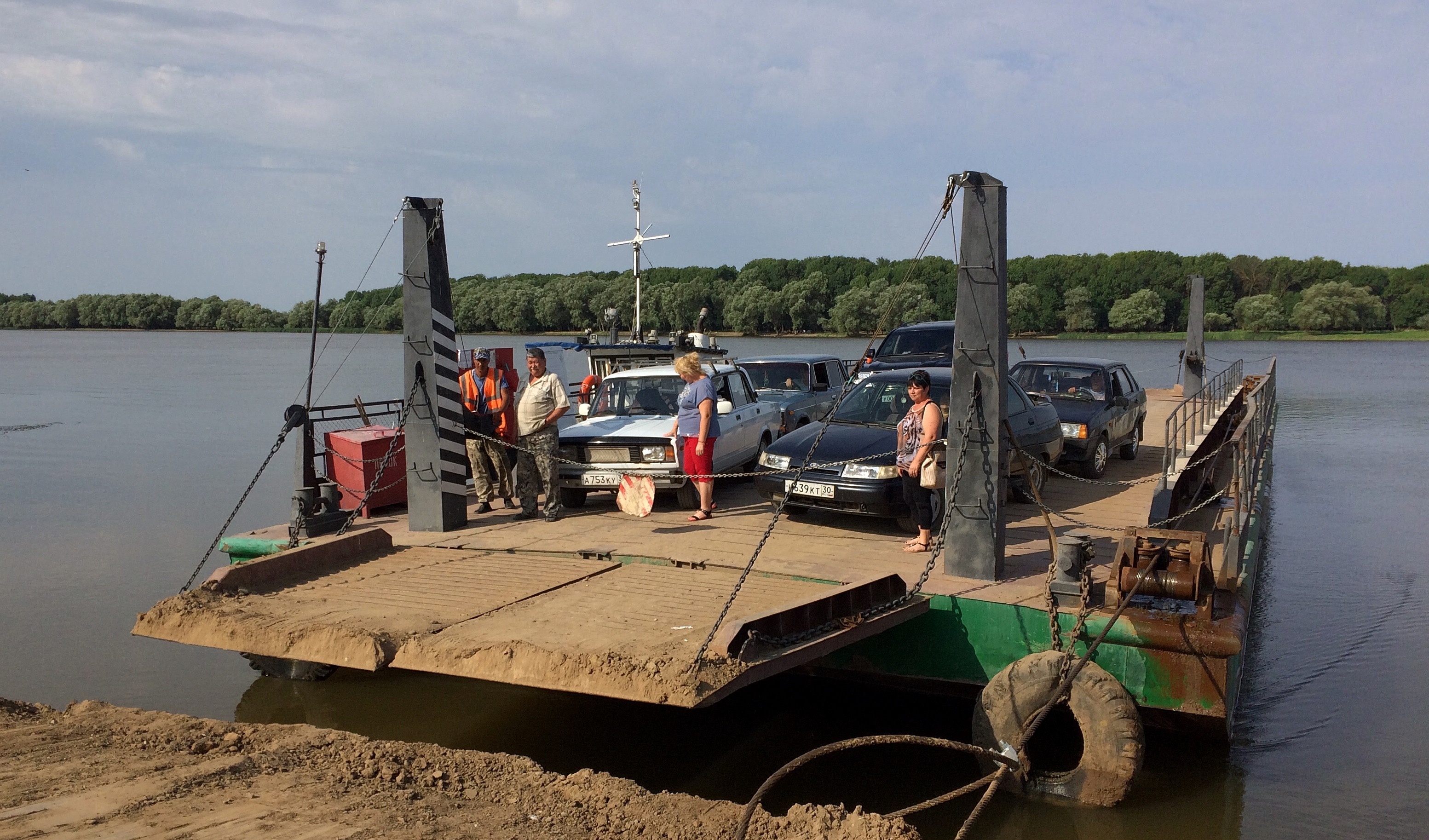

Location
- Country: Russia

Physical characteristics
- Source: Volga
  - coordinates: 46.2691°N 47.9519°E
- Mouth: Caspian Sea
  - coordinates: 45.6797°N 48.1127°E
- Length: 67 km (42 mi)

The Kamyzyak (Russian: Камызяк, also: Кизань - Kizan) is a river of Astrakhan Oblast, Russia. It is a distributary of the Volga in the Volga delta in the Caspian Sea area. It is 67 kilometres (42 mi) long. The city of Kamyzyak lies on its banks.
