= Lake Baskunchak =

Lake Baskunchak Баскунчак
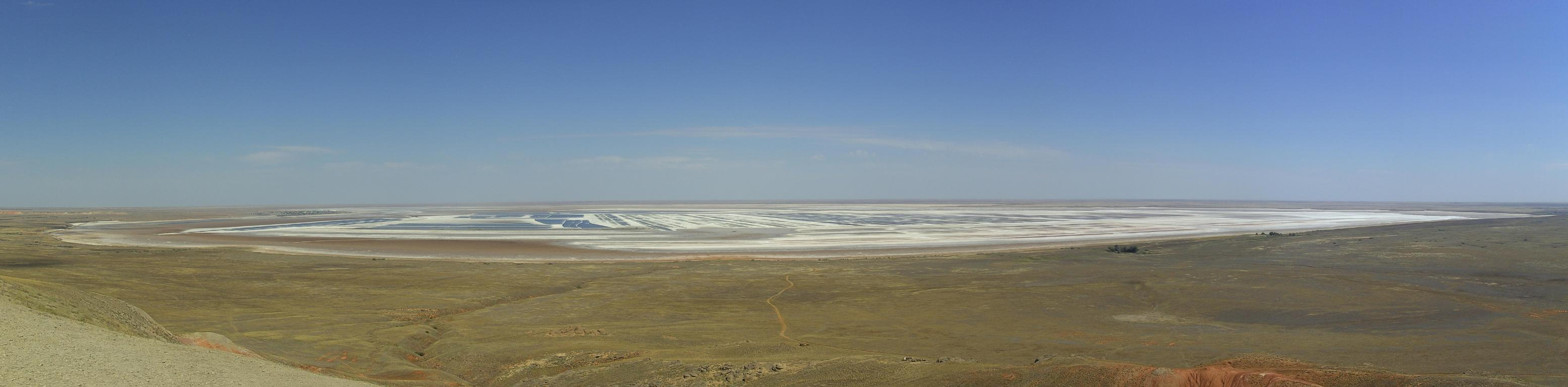
- Panoramic view of the salt lake Baskunchak

- Location within Russia
- Location: Astrakhan Oblast, Russia
- Coordinates: 48°10′N 46°53′E
- Type: Hypersaline lake
- Catchment area: 11,000 km^{2} (4,200 sq mi)
- Basin countries: Russia
- Surface area: 115 km^{2} (44 sq mi)
- Surface elevation: −21 m (−69 ft)

Lake Baskunchak (Russian: Баскунчак; Kazakh: Басқұншақ, romanized: Basqunshaq) is a salt lake of 115 km^{2} in Astrakhan Oblast, Russia, located at 48°10′N 46°53′E, about 270 km north of the Caspian Sea, and 53 km east of the Volga. Since 1997, the area is protected as part of the Bogdinsko-Baskunchakski Nature Reserve.

The surface elevation of the lake is 21 m below sea level. It is fed by a river that draws from an area of 11,000 km^{2}. The salinity of the lake is about 300 g/L. Since the 8th century, its salt was mined and traded along the Silk Road. Nowadays, the lake's salt of distinct purity (99.8% NaCl) covers 80% of Russia's salt production. Depending on demand, 1.5 million to 5 million tons of salt are mined per year.

To the south of the lake, Mount Bolshoye Bogdo rises to 150 m above sea level, forming the highest elevation in the Caspian Depression. The hill is pushed up about 1 mm per year by a salt dome. Sinkholes, and Karst caves of up to 1.5 km length lead through the hill. It also is the only area in Europe where Triassic lagerstätten surface. To the local Kalmyk people, it is a sacred location.

On the coast of the lake, there are deposits of medicinal clay and mud. The high season of the tourist season here is in the summer months - from May to September. The natural conditions of the area are truly unique: the healing air is high in bromine and phytoncides, sulphide silt mud, similar in effect and composition to the Dead Sea mud, sodium chloride brine containing macro-complex and trace elements.

== See also ==
- Lake Elton
