= Chyorny Yar, Astrakhan Oblast =

Rural locality of Astrakhan Oblast, Russia

Chyorny Yar Чёрный Яр
- Selo
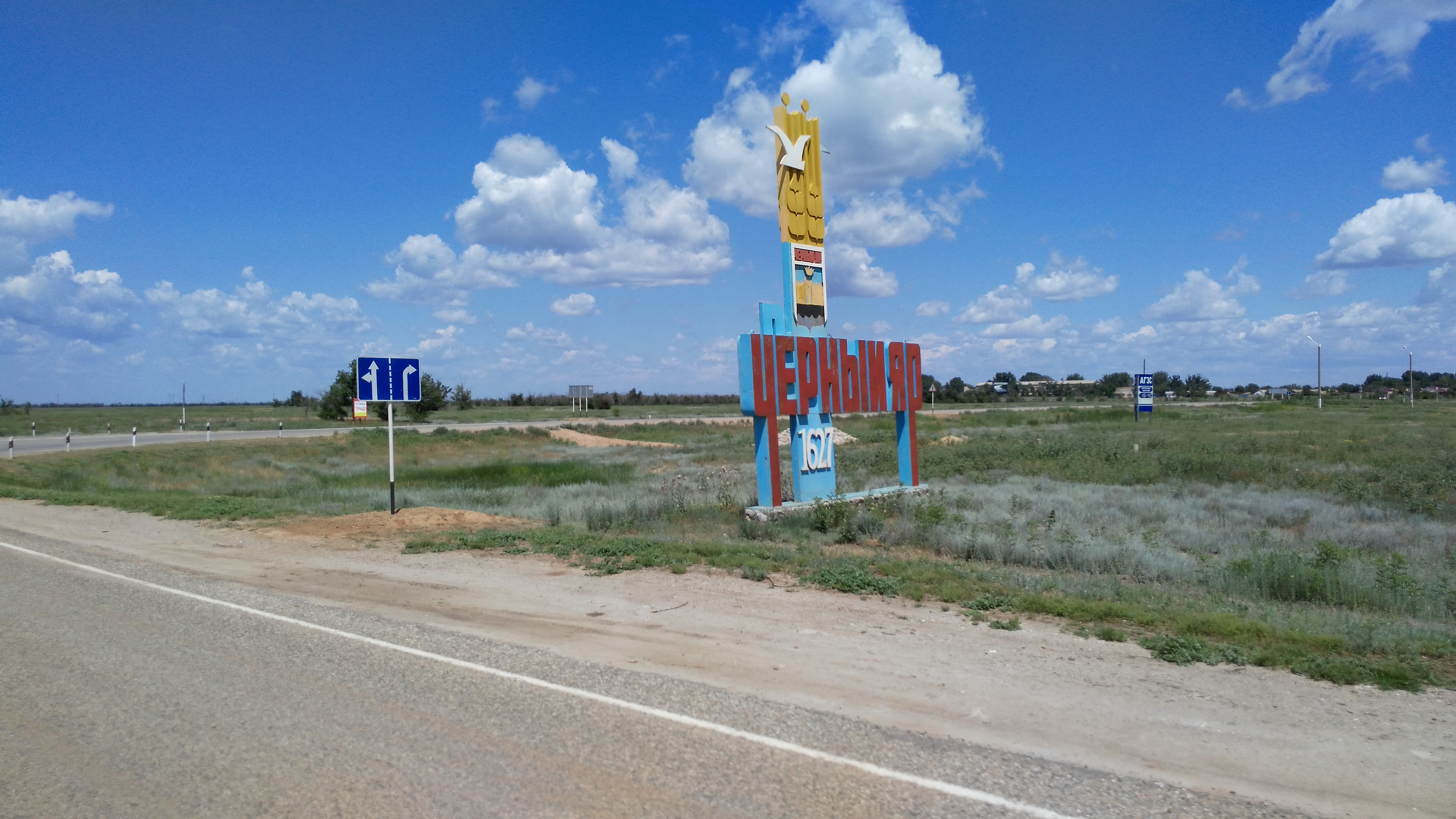

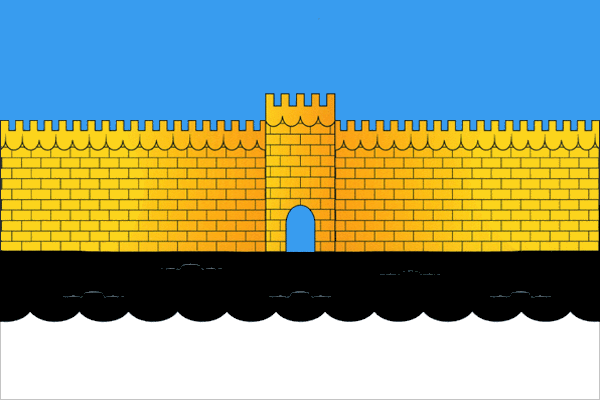
- Flag
- Interactive map of Chyorny Yar
- Location of Chyorny Yar Chyorny Yar (Astrakhan Oblast)
- Coordinates: 48°03′30″N 46°07′00″E
- Country: Russia
- Federal subject: Astrakhan Oblast
- Founded: 1627
- Selo status since: 1925

Population
  - Estimate (2021): 6,775 )

Administrative status
  - Capital of: Chernoyarsky District
- Time zone: UTC+4 (MSK+1)
- Postal code: 416230
- Dialing code: +7 85149
- OKTMO ID: 12650436101

Chyorny Yar (Russian: Чёрный Яр, lit. black bluff) is a rural locality (a selo) and the administrative center of Chernoyarsky District of Astrakhan Oblast, Russia, located on the elevated right bank of the Volga River. Population: 7,779 (2010 census); 8,043 (2002 census); 8,100 (1989 Soviet census); 7,642 (1899 est.).

It was established as a fort on the left bank of the Volga in 1627. Seven years later, it was moved to the opposite bank. In 1785, it was designated an uyezd town. The stanitsa of Chernoyarskaya used to be an important center of the Astrakhan Cossack Host. In 1925, it was demoted in status to that of a rural locality.
