= Chernoyarsky District =

Chernoyarsky District Черноярский район (Russian)
- District
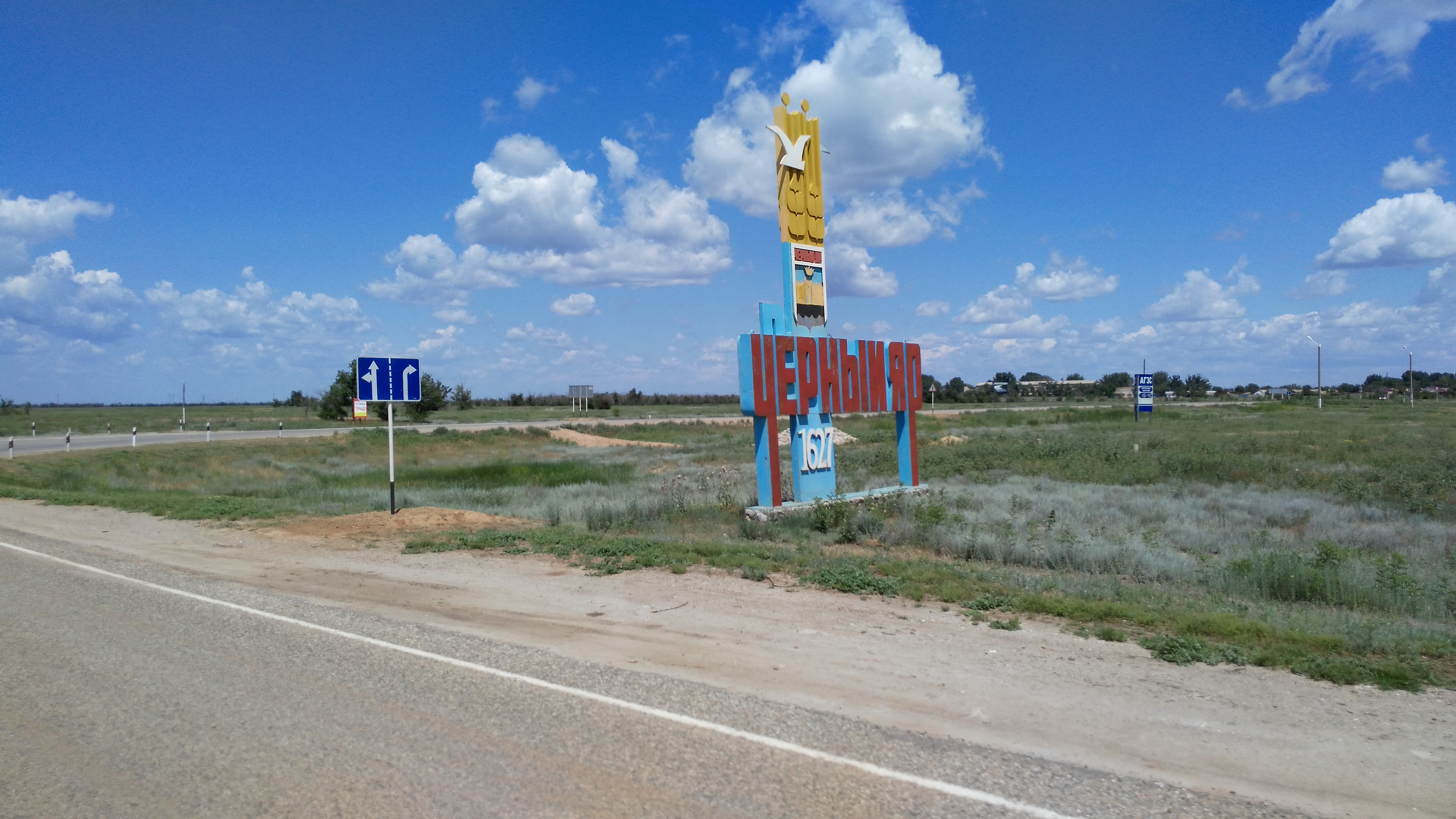
- Welcome sign at the entrance to the selo of Chyorny Yar, the administrative center of Chernoyarsky District

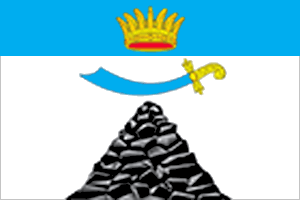
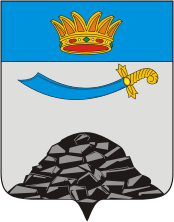
- Flag Coat of arms
- Location of Chernoyarsky District in Astrakhan Oblast
- Coordinates: 48°04′N 46°07′E
- Country: Russia
- Federal subject: Astrakhan Oblast
- Established: July 1928 (first), March 2, 1964 (second)
- Administrative center: Chyorny Yar

Area
  - Total: 4,217.99 km^{2} (1,628.58 sq mi)

Population (2010 Census)
  - Total: 20,220
  - Estimate (January 2015): 19,653
  - Density: 4.794/km^{2} (12.42/sq mi)
  - Urban: 0%
  - Rural: 100%

Administrative structure
  - Administrative divisions: 2 Selsoviets
  - Inhabited localities: 17 rural localities

Municipal structure
  - Municipally incorporated as: Chernoyarsky Municipal District
  - Municipal divisions: 0 urban settlements, 2 rural settlements
- Time zone: UTC+4 (MSK+1)
- OKTMO ID: 12650000
- Website: http://admcherjar.ru/swp

Population of Chernoyarsky District
- 2010 Census: 20,220
- 2002 Census: 21,293
- 1989 Census: 20,966
- 1979 Census: 20,709

Chernoyarsky District (Russian: Черноя́рский райо́н) is an administrative and municipal district (raion), one of the eleven in Astrakhan Oblast, Russia. It is located in the north of the oblast. The area of the district is 4,217.99 square kilometers (1,628.58 sq mi). Its administrative center is the rural locality (a selo) of Chyorny Yar. As of the 2010 Census, the total population of the district was 20,220, with the population of Chyorny Yar accounting for 38.5% of that number.

== History ==
The district was first established in July 1928 by merging Chernoyarskaya Volost and a part of Kamennoyarskaya Volost of Stalingrad Governorate with three rural localities in Yenotayevsky District. In 1931, the district was transferred to Lower Volga Krai but was moved back to Astrakhan Oblast in October 1947. In December 1962, the district was dissolved and merged into Yenotayevsky District. On March 2, 1964, the district was re-established.
