= Akhtubinsk =

Town in Astrakhan Oblast, Russia

Akhtubinsk Ахтубинск
- Town
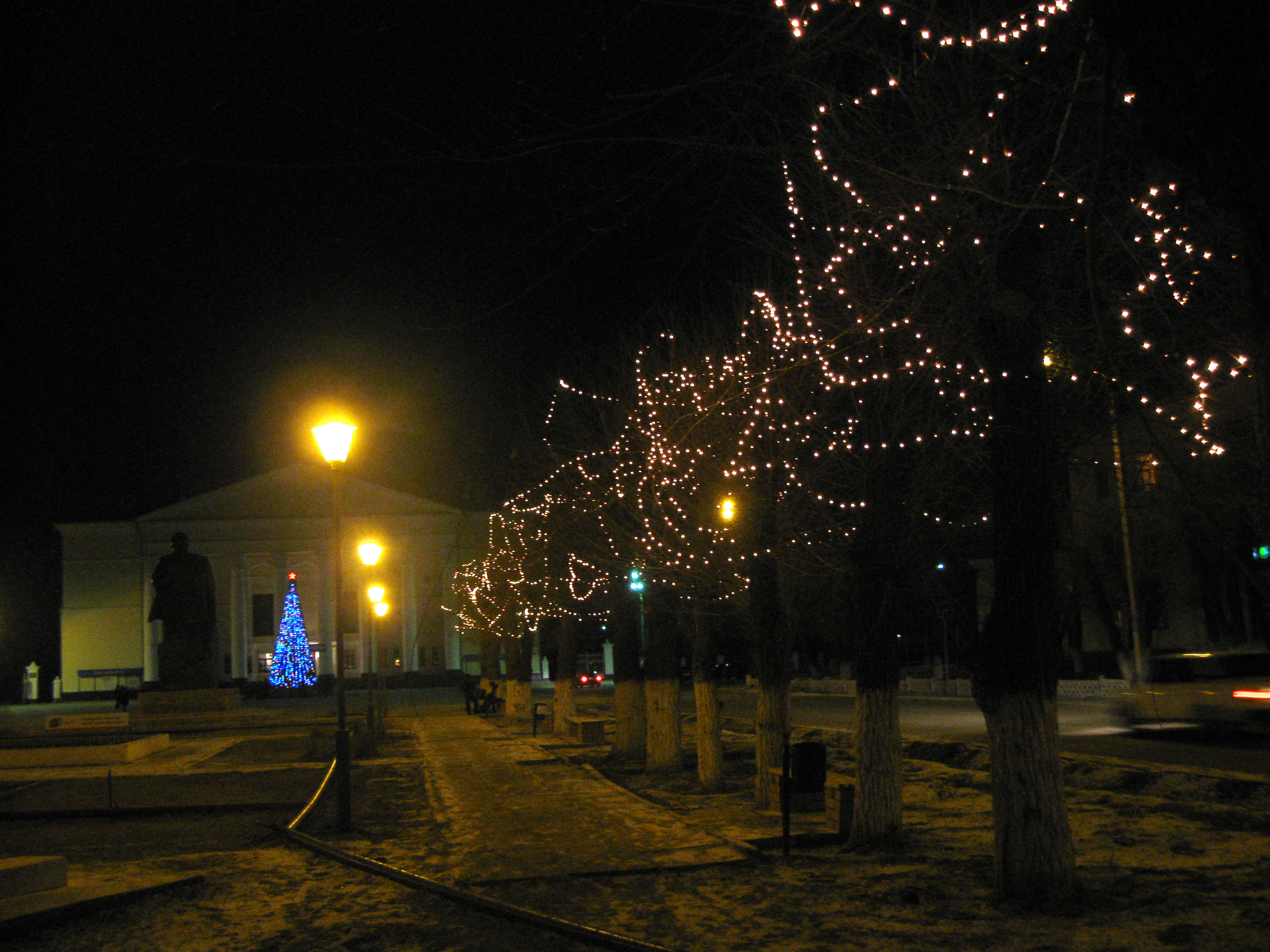
- Lenina Square in Akhtubinsk

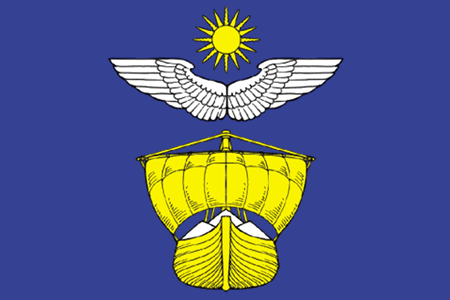
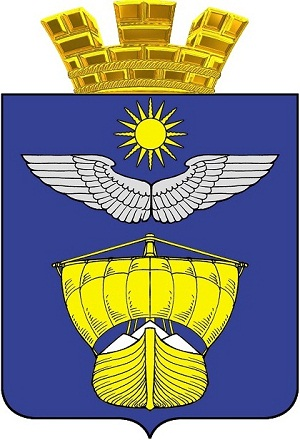
- Flag Coat of arms
- Interactive map of Akhtubinsk
- Location of Akhtubinsk Akhtubinsk (Astrakhan Oblast)
- Coordinates: 48°17′N 46°10′E
- Country: Russia
- Federal subject: Astrakhan Oblast
- Administrative district: Akhtubinsky District
- Town of district significanceSelsoviet: Akhtubinsk
- Founded: 1959
- Elevation: 1 m (3.3 ft)

Population (2010 Census)
  - Total: 41,853
  - Estimate (2025): 34,873 (−16.7%)

Administrative status
  - Capital of: Akhtubinsky District, town of district significance of Akhtubinsk

Municipal status
  - Municipal district: Akhtubinsky Municipal District
  - Urban settlement: Akhtubinsk Urban Settlement
  - Capital of: Akhtubinsky Municipal District, Akhtubinsk Urban Settlement
- Time zone: UTC+4 (MSK+1)
- Postal code: 416500–416507
- OKTMO ID: 12605101001
- Website: www.adm-akhtubinsk.ru

Akhtubinsk (Russian: Ахту́бинск) is a town and the administrative center of Akhtubinsky District in Astrakhan Oblast, Russia, located on the left bank of the Akhtuba River (a distributary of the Volga), 292 kilometers (181 mi) north of Astrakhan, the administrative center of the oblast. Population: 41,853 (2010 census); 45,542 (2002 Census); 50,261 (1989 Soviet census); 30,000 (1968).

== History ==
It was founded in 1959 by the merger of three settlements: Vladimirovka, Petropavlovskoye, and Akhtuba.

== Administrative and municipal status ==
Within the framework of administrative divisions, Akhtubinsk serves as the administrative center of Akhtubinsky District. As an administrative division, it is, together with five rural localities, incorporated within Akhtubinsky District as the town of district significance of Akhtubinsk. As a municipal division, the town of district significance of Akhtubinsk is incorporated within Akhtubinsky Municipal District as Akhtubinsk Urban Settlement.

== Economy ==
The major enterprises in the town include a shipbuilding and repair plant, a milk factory, a meat factory, a bakery, and a mineral water plant.

Akhtubinsk is the transfer point for Bassol, the industrial complex which extracts salt from Lake Baskunchak.

=== Transportation ===
The Volgograd–Astrakhan road passes through Akhtubinsk.

- Vladimirovka and Akhtuba railway stations on the Volgograd-Verkhny Baskunchak railway branch
- Vladimirovskaya Quay terminal
- a cargo port on the Akhtuba River
- a military airbase (Akhtubinsk (air base))

== Military ==
A state flight testing center known as Valery Chkalov 929 GLITs MO RF is located in Akhtubinsk. The Groshevo (Vladimirovka) military testing range is located to the north of Akhtubinsk.

In 2012 construction of a site for flight test operations began, including new runway specifically designed to accommodate flight testing of the Sukhoi Su-57 stealth fighter currently under development.

== Sources ==
- Государственная Дума Астраханской области. Закон №67/2006-ОЗ от 4 октября 2006 г. «Об административно-территориальном устройстве Астраханской области», в ред. Закона №46/2017-ОЗ от 5 сентября 2017 г. «О преобразовании муниципальных образований и административно-территориальных единиц "Лебяжинский сельсовет", "Образцово-Травинский сельсовет", "Полдневский сельсовет" и внесении изменений в Закон Астраханской области "Об установлении границ муниципальных образований и наделении их статусом сельского, городского поселения, городского округа, муниципального района" и Закон Астраханской области "Об административно-территориальном устройстве Астраханской области"». Вступил в силу по истечении 10 дней со дня официального опубликования. Опубликован: "Сборник законов и нормативных правовых актов Астраханской области", №47, 19 октября 2006 г. (State Duma of Astrakhan Oblast. Law #67/2006-OZ of October 4, 2006 On the Administrative-Territorial Structure of Astrakhan Oblast, as amended by the Law #46/2017-OZ of September 5, 2017 On the Transformation of the Municipal Formations and the Administrative-Territorial Units of "Lebyazhinsky Selsoviet", "Obraztsovo-Travinsky Selsoviet", "Poldnevsky Selsoviet", and Amending the Law of Astrakhan Oblast "On Establishing the Borders of the Municipal Formations and on Granting Them the Status of Rural, Urban Settlement, Urban Okrug, Municipal District" and the Law of Astrakhan Oblast "On the Administrative-Territorial Structure of Astrakhan Oblast". Effective as of after ten days from the day of the official publication have passed.).
- Государственная Дума Астраханской области. Закон №43/2004-ОЗ от 6 августа 2004 г. «Об установлении границ муниципальных образований и наделении их статусом сельского, городского поселения, городского округа, муниципального района», в ред. Закона №47/2017-ОЗ от 5 сентября 2017 г. «О внесении изменений в Закон Астраханской области "Об установлении границ муниципальных образований и наделении их статусом сельского, городского поселения, городского округа, муниципального района"». Вступил в силу через 10 дней со дня официального опубликования. Опубликован: "Астраханские известия", №34, 12 августа 2004 г. (State Duma of Astrakhan Oblast. Law #43/2004-OZ of August 6, 2004 On Establishing the Borders of the Municipal Formations and on Granting Them the Status of Rural, Urban Settlement, Urban Okrug, Municipal District, as amended by the Law #47/2017-OZ of September 5, 2017 On Amending the Law of Astrakhan Oblast "On Establishing the Borders of the Municipal Formations and on Granting Them the Status of Rural, Urban Settlement, Urban Okrug, Municipal District". Effective as of the day which is 10 days after the official publication.).
