= Kamyzyaksky District =

Kamyzyaksky District Камызякский район (Russian)
- District
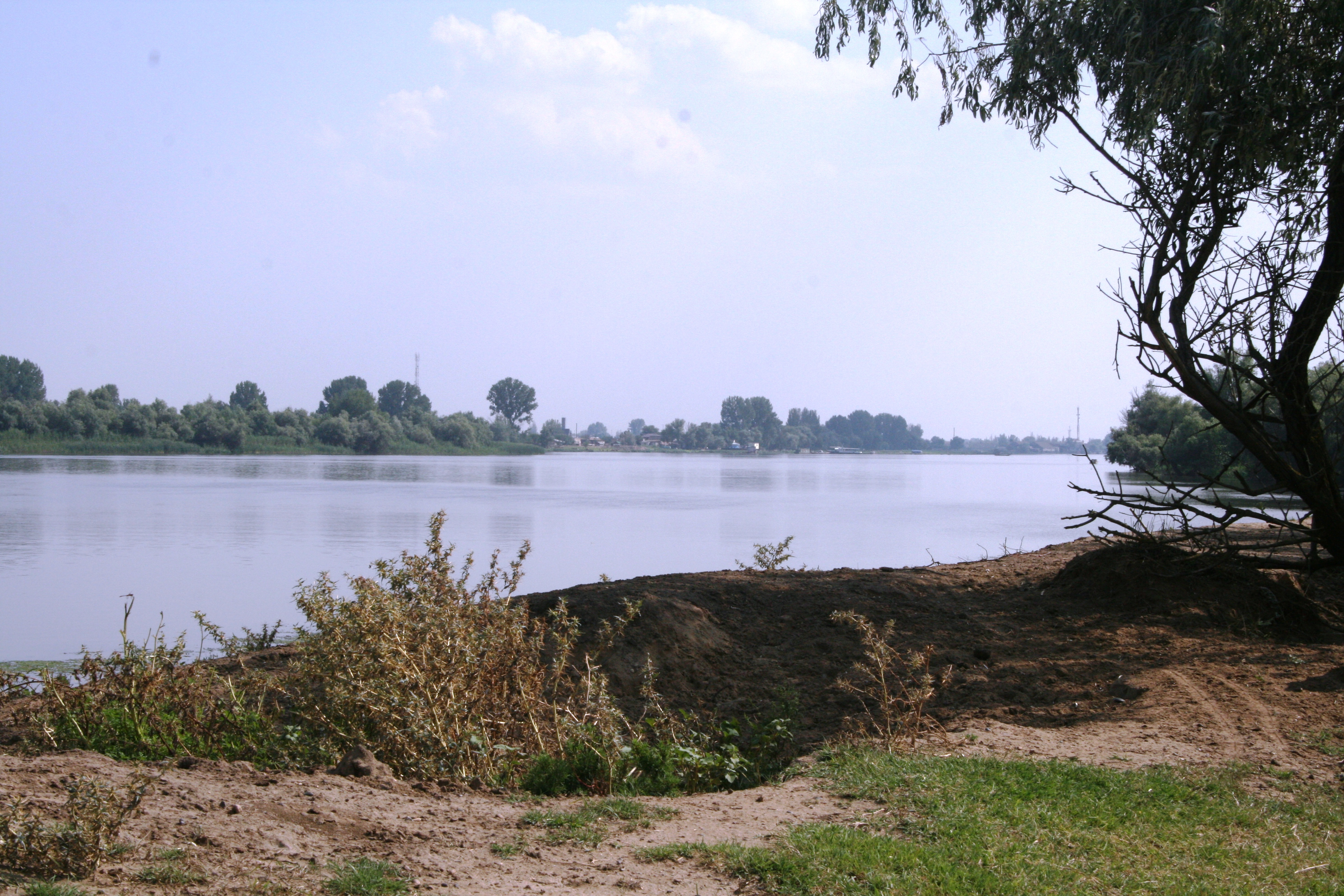
- The Kamyzyak River in Kamyzyaksky District

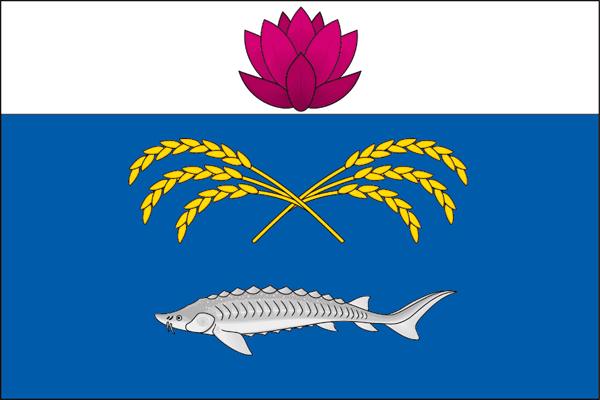
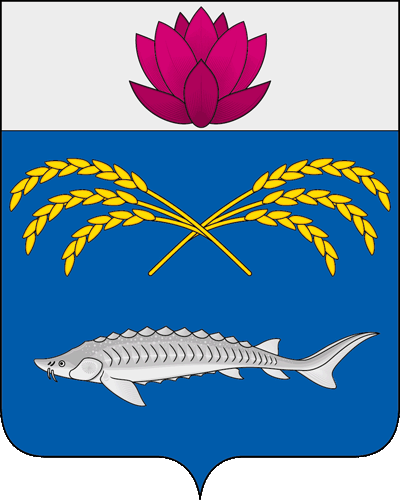
- Flag Coat of arms
- Location of Kamyzyaksky District in Astrakhan Oblast
- Coordinates: 46°07′N 48°05′E
- Country: Russia
- Federal subject: Astrakhan Oblast
- Established: July 14, 1925
- Administrative center: Kamyzyak

Area
  - Total: 3,493 km^{2} (1,349 sq mi)

Population (2010 Census)
  - Total: 48,647
  - Estimate (January 2016): 47,836
  - Density: 13.93/km^{2} (36.07/sq mi)
  - Urban: 43.5%
  - Rural: 56.5%

Administrative structure
  - Administrative divisions: 1 Towns of district significance, 2 Urban-type settlements, 12 Selsoviets
  - Inhabited localities: 1 cities/towns, 2 urban-type settlements, 44 rural localities

Municipal structure
  - Municipally incorporated as: Kamyzyaksky Municipal District
  - Municipal divisions: 3 urban settlements, 12 rural settlements
- Time zone: UTC+4 (MSK+1)
- OKTMO ID: 12625000
- Website: http://kamyzak.ru

Population of Kamyzyaksky District
- 2010 Census: 48,647
- 2002 Census: 49,837
- 1989 Census: 50,336
- 1979 Census: 49,435

Kamyzyaksky District (Russian: Камызя́кский райо́н; Kazakh: Құмөзек ауданы, Qūmözek audany) is an administrative and municipal district (raion), one of the eleven in Astrakhan Oblast, Russia. It is located in the south of the oblast. The area of the district is 3,493 square kilometers (1,349 sq mi). Its administrative center is the town of Kamyzyak. As of the 2010 Census, the total population of the district was 48,647, with the population of Kamyzyak accounting for 33.5% of that number.

== History ==
The district was established on July 14, 1925 when Astrakhan Governorate's administrative-territorial system was changed from uyezds and volosts to districts and rural communities. In May 1944, a part of the district's territory was transferred to Travinsky and Zelenginsky Districts. When Travinsky District was abolished in 1963, its territory was merged into Kamyzyaksky District.
