= Kamyzyak =

Town in Astrakhan Oblast, Russia

Kamyzyak Камызяк
- Town
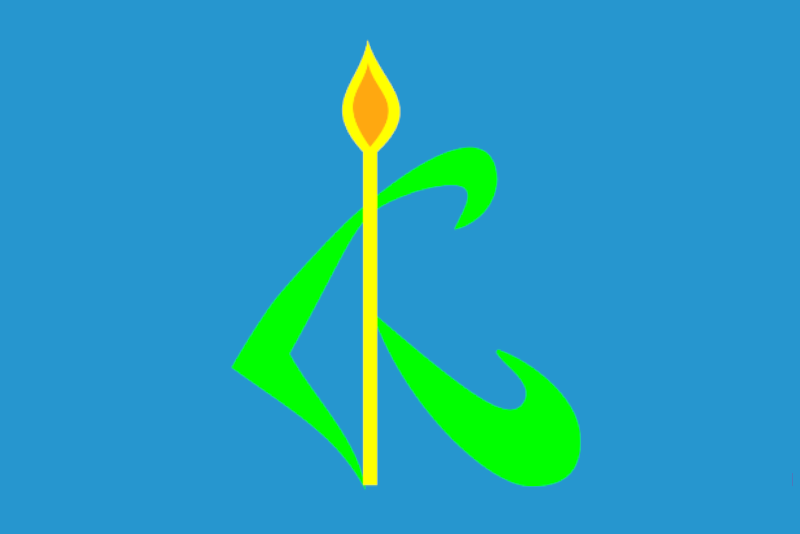
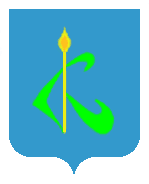
- Flag Coat of arms
- Interactive map of Kamyzyak
- Location of Kamyzyak Kamyzyak (Astrakhan Oblast)
- Coordinates: 46°07′N 48°05′E
- Country: Russia
- Federal subject: Astrakhan Oblast
- Administrative district: Kamyzyaksky District
- Town of district significanceSelsoviet: Kamyzyak
- Founded: 1560
- Town status since: February 2, 1973
- Elevation: 0 m (0 ft)

Population (2010 Census)
  - Total: 16,314
  - Estimate (2021): 16,154 (−1%)

Administrative status
  - Capital of: Kamyzyaksky District, town of district significance of Kamyzyak

Municipal status
  - Municipal district: Kamyzyaksky Municipal District
  - Urban settlement: Kamyzyak Urban Settlement
  - Capital of: Kamyzyaksky Municipal District, Kamyzyak Urban Settlement
- Time zone: UTC+4 (MSK+1)
- Postal code: 416340–416349
- OKTMO ID: 12625101001
- Website: xn--80aohci4g3a.com

Kamyzyak (Russian: Камызя́к) is a town and the administrative center of Kamyzyaksky District in Astrakhan Oblast, Russia, located on the Kamyzyak River (a branch in the delta of the Volga), 27 kilometers (17 mi) south of Astrakhan, the administrative center of the oblast. Population: 16,314 (2010 census); 16,052 (2002 census); 15,084 (1989 Soviet census).

== History ==
Kamyzyak was founded in 1560 as a fishing village along the Volga. It was granted town status on February 2, 1973.

== Administrative and municipal status ==
Within the framework of administrative divisions, Kamyzyak serves as the administrative center of Kamyzyaksky District. As an administrative division, it is incorporated within Kamyzyaksky District as the town of district significance of Kamyzyak. As a municipal division, the town of district significance of Kamyzyak is incorporated within Kamyzyaksky Municipal District as Kamyzyak Urban Settlement.
