= Akhtubinsky District =

Akhtubinsky District Ахтубинский район (Russian)
- District
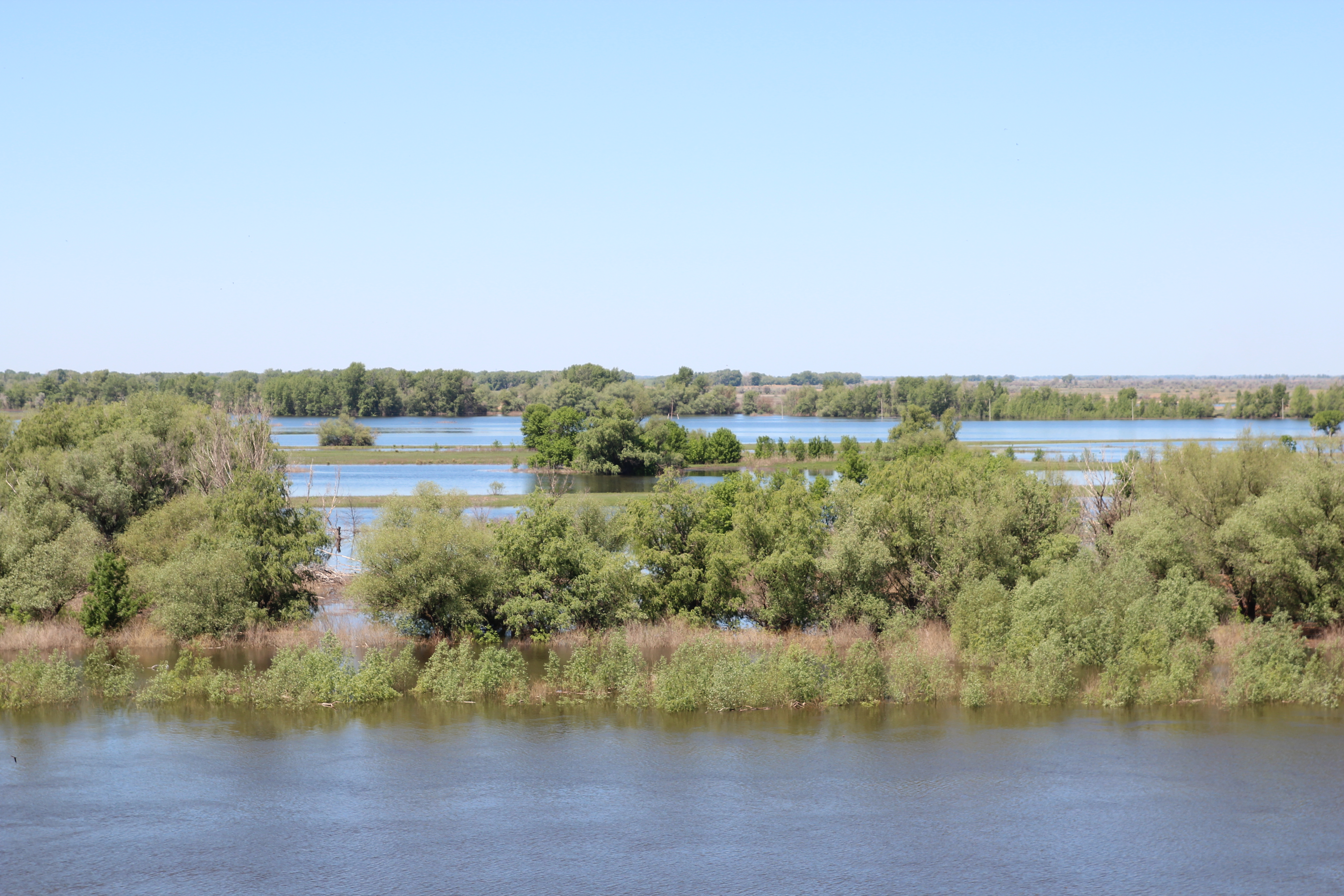
- Akhtuba flood and Ashuluka

- Flag Coat of arms
- Location of Akhtubinsky District in Astrakhan Oblast
- Coordinates: 48°16′N 46°21′E
- Country: Russia
- Federal subject: Astrakhan Oblast
- Established: 1928
- Administrative center: Akhtubinsk

Area
  - Total: 7,810 km^{2} (3,020 sq mi)

Population (2010 Census)
  - Total: 29,326
  - Density: 3.75/km^{2} (9.73/sq mi)
  - Urban: 38.2%
  - Rural: 61.8%

Administrative structure
  - Administrative divisions: 1 Towns of district significance, 2 Urban-type settlements, 12 Selsoviets
  - Inhabited localities: 1 cities/towns, 2 urban-type settlements, 41 rural localities

Municipal structure
  - Municipally incorporated as: Akhtubinsky Municipal District
  - Municipal divisions: 3 urban settlements, 12 rural settlements
- Time zone: UTC+4 (MSK+1)
- OKTMO ID: 12605000
- Website: http://ahtuba.astrobl.ru

Akhtubinsky District (Russian: Ахту́бинский райо́н; Kazakh: Ақтөбе ауданы, Aqtóbe aýdany) is an administrative and municipal district (raion), one of the eleven in Astrakhan Oblast, Russia. It is located in the north of the oblast. The area of the district is 7,810 square kilometers (3,020 sq mi). Its administrative center is the town of Akhtubinsk Population (excluding the administrative center): 29,326 (2010 census); 31,963 (2002 Census); 37,043 (1989 Soviet census).
