= Charoda, Republic of Dagestan =

Charoda Чарода
- Selo
- Location within Republic of Dagestan Location within Russia
- Coordinates: 42°16′N 46°48′E
- Country: Russia
- Region: Republic of Dagestan
- District: Charodinsky District
- Time zone: UTC+3:00

Charoda (Russian: Чарода) is a rural locality (a selo) in Charodinsky District, Republic of Dagestan, Russia. Population: 454 (2021 census); 359 (2002 census); 329 (1989 Soviet census). There is 1 street in this selo.

== Geography ==
Selo is located 5 km from Tsurib (the district's administrative centre), 96 km from Makhachkala (capital of Dagestan) and 1,678 km from Moscow. Murukh is the nearest rural locality.
