= Kubatl =

Kubatl Кубатль
- Selo
- Location within Republic of Dagestan Location within Russia
- Coordinates: 42°02′N 46°51′E
- Country: Russia
- Region: Republic of Dagestan
- District: Charodinsky District
- Time zone: UTC+3:00

Kubatl (Russian: Кубатль) is a rural locality (a selo) in Charodinsky District, Republic of Dagestan, Russia. Population: 137 (2021 census); 117 (2002 census); 75 (1989 Soviet census). There is 1 street in this selo.

== Geography ==
Selo is located 22 km from Tsurib (the district's administrative centre), 117 km from Makhachkala (capital of Dagestan) and 1,706 km from Moscow. Alchunib is the nearest rural locality.
