= Shalib =

Shalib Шалиб
- Selo
- Location within Republic of Dagestan Location within Russia
- Coordinates: 42°05′N 46°55′E
- Country: Russia
- Region: Republic of Dagestan
- District: Charodinsky District
- Time zone: UTC+3:00

Shalib (Russian: Шалиб) is a rural locality (a selo) in Charodinsky District, Republic of Dagestan, Russia. Population: 206 (2021 census); 145 (2002 census); 182 (1989 Soviet census). There are 3 streets in this selo.

== Geography ==
Selo is located 18 km from Tsurib (the district's administrative centre), 109 km from Makhachkala (capital of Dagestan) and 1,702 km from Moscow. Chanab is the nearest rural locality.
