= Chunib =

Chunib Чуниб
- Selo
- Location within Republic of Dagestan Location within Russia
- Coordinates: 42°12′N 46°49′E
- Country: Russia
- Region: Republic of Dagestan
- District: Charodinsky District
- Time zone: UTC+3:00

Chunib (Russian: Чуниб) is a rural locality (a selo) in Charodinsky District, Republic of Dagestan, Russia. Population: 125 (2021 census); 77 (2002 census); 48 (1989 Soviet census). There is 1 street in this selo.

== Geography ==
Selo is located 3 km from Tsurib (the district's administrative centre), 102 km from Makhachkala (capital of Dagestan) and 1,687 km from Moscow. Tseneb is the nearest rural locality.
