= Yandyki =

Yandyki Яндыки
- Selo
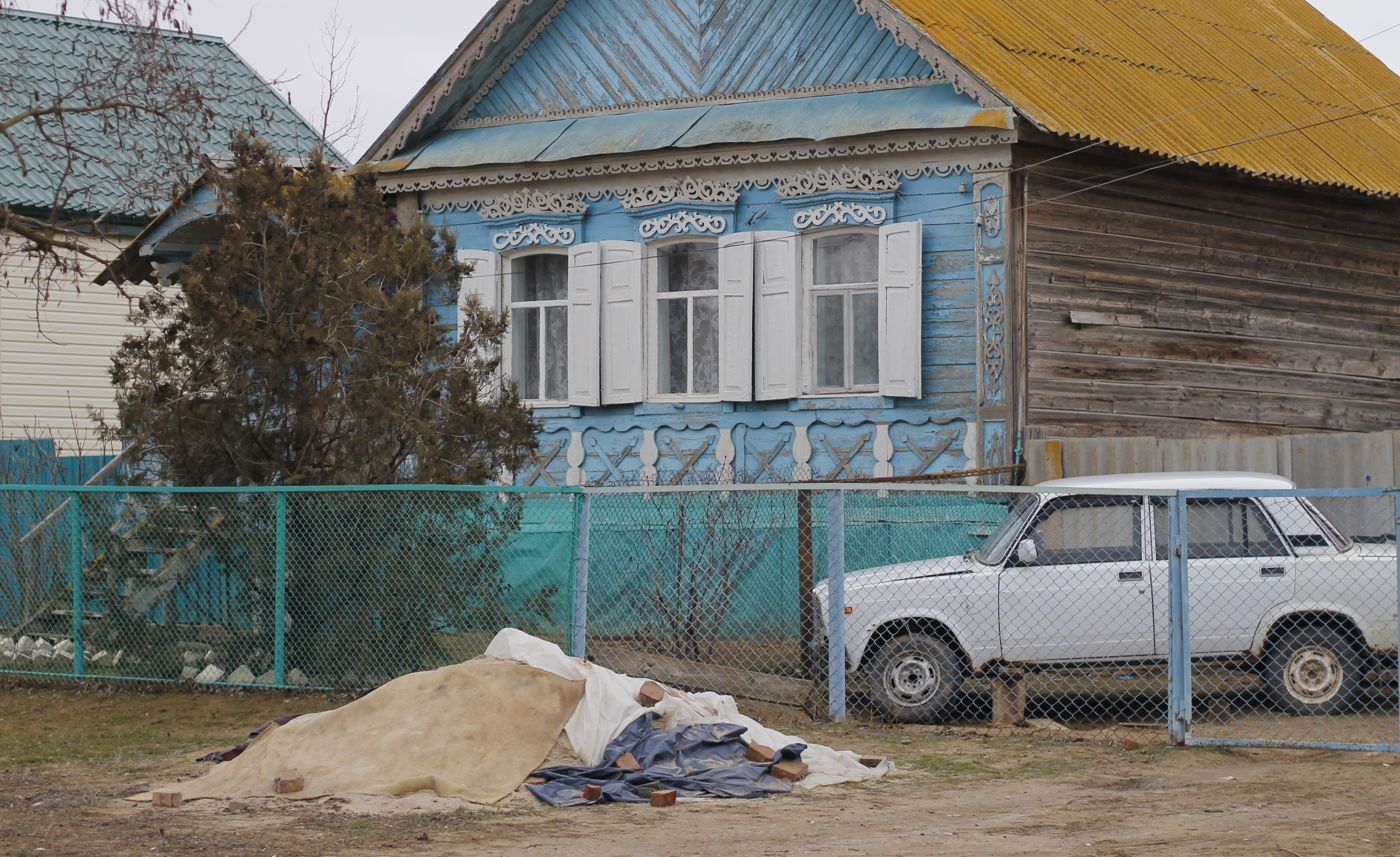

- Location within Astrakhan Oblast Location within Russia
- Coordinates: 45°46′N 47°07′E
- Country: Russia
- Region: Astrakhan Oblast
- District: Limansky District
- Time zone: UTC+4:00

Yandyki (Russian: Яндыки) is a rural locality (a selo) and the administrative center of Yandykovsky Selsoviet, Limansky District, Astrakhan Oblast, Russia. The population was 3,135 as of 2010. There are 15 streets.

== History ==
In August 2005 the village became the center of a series of clashes between Kalmyks and Chechens. A large group of Chechen migrant workers had moved into the town to work on a collective farm. According to locals the Chechens had begun forming gangs and were harassing the local townsfolk, as well as desecrating Russian Orthodox Cross graves, and a war memorial to Kalmyks that died during the Chechen wars. According to the Chechens the locals were jealous of the jobs and money they were earning while the rest of the village was in poverty, and the local Chechen community was being routinely harassed due to Anti-Chechen sentiment. The clashes came to a head when a group of approximately 80 Kalmyks confronted a group of Chechen vandals in the local cemetery, and in the ensuing scuffle a Kalmyk was killed. In reprisal, the Kalmyks began a pogrom against the Chechens, burning down six houses and sending dozens of Chechens to the hospital with minor injuries.

== Geography ==
Yandyki is located 9 km west of Liman (the district's administrative centre) by road. Liman is the nearest rural locality.
