= Sachada =

Sachada Сачада
- Selo
- Location within Republic of Dagestan Location within Russia
- Coordinates: 42°15′N 46°41′E
- Country: Russia
- Region: Republic of Dagestan
- District: Charodinsky District
- Time zone: UTC+3:00

Sachada (Russian: Сачада) is a rural locality (a selo) in Charodinsky District, Republic of Dagestan, Russia. Population: 193 (2021 census); 175 (2002 census); 262 (1989 Soviet census). There is 1 street in this selo.

== Geography ==
Selo is located 11 km from Tsurib (the district's administrative centre), 103 km from Makhachkala (capital of Dagestan) and 1,676 km from Moscow. Sumeta is the nearest rural locality.
