= Gidib =

Gidib Гидиб
- Selo
- Location within Republic of Dagestan Location within Russia
- Coordinates: 42°13′N 46°48′E
- Country: Russia
- Region: Republic of Dagestan
- District: Charodinsky District
- Time zone: UTC+3:00

Gidib (Russian: Гидиб) is a rural locality (a selo) in Charodinsky District, Republic of Dagestan, Russia. Population: 103 (2021 census); 49 (2002 census); 262 (1989 Soviet census). There is 1 street in this selo.

== Geography ==
Selo is located 2 km from Tsurib (the district's administrative centre), 100 km from Makhachkala (capital of Dagestan) and 1,683 km from Moscow. Moshob is the nearest rural locality.
