= Khinub =

Khinub Хинуб
- Selo
- Location within Republic of Dagestan Location within Russia
- Coordinates: 42°10′N 46°49′E
- Country: Russia
- Region: Republic of Dagestan
- District: Charodinsky District
- Time zone: UTC+3:00

Khinub (Russian: Хинуб) is a rural locality (a selo) in Charodinsky District, Republic of Dagestan, Russia. Population: 454 (2021 census); 289 (2002 census); 274 (1989 Soviet census). There are 2 streets in this selo.

== Geography ==
Selo is located 7 km from Tsurib (the district's administrative centre), 105 km from Makhachkala (capital of Dagestan) and 1,690 km from Moscow. Irib is the nearest rural locality.
