= Khurukh =

Khurukh Хурух
- Selo
- Location within Republic of Dagestan Location within Russia
- Coordinates: 42°11′N 46°51′E
- Country: Russia
- Region: Republic of Dagestan
- District: Charodinsky District
- Time zone: UTC+3:00

Khurukh (Russian: Хурух) is a rural locality (a selo) in Charodinsky District, Republic of Dagestan, Russia. Population: 306 (2021 census); 114 (2002 census); 92 (1989 Soviet census). There is 1 street in this selo.

== Geography ==
Selo is located 6 km from Tsurib (the district's administrative centre), 102 km from Makhachkala (capital of Dagestan) and 1,690 km from Moscow. Mukutl is the nearest rural locality.
