= Magar, Republic of Dagestan =

Magar Магар
- Selo
- Location within Republic of Dagestan Location within Russia
- Coordinates: 42°11′N 46°50′E
- Country: Russia
- Region: Republic of Dagestan
- District: Charodinsky District
- Time zone: UTC+3:00

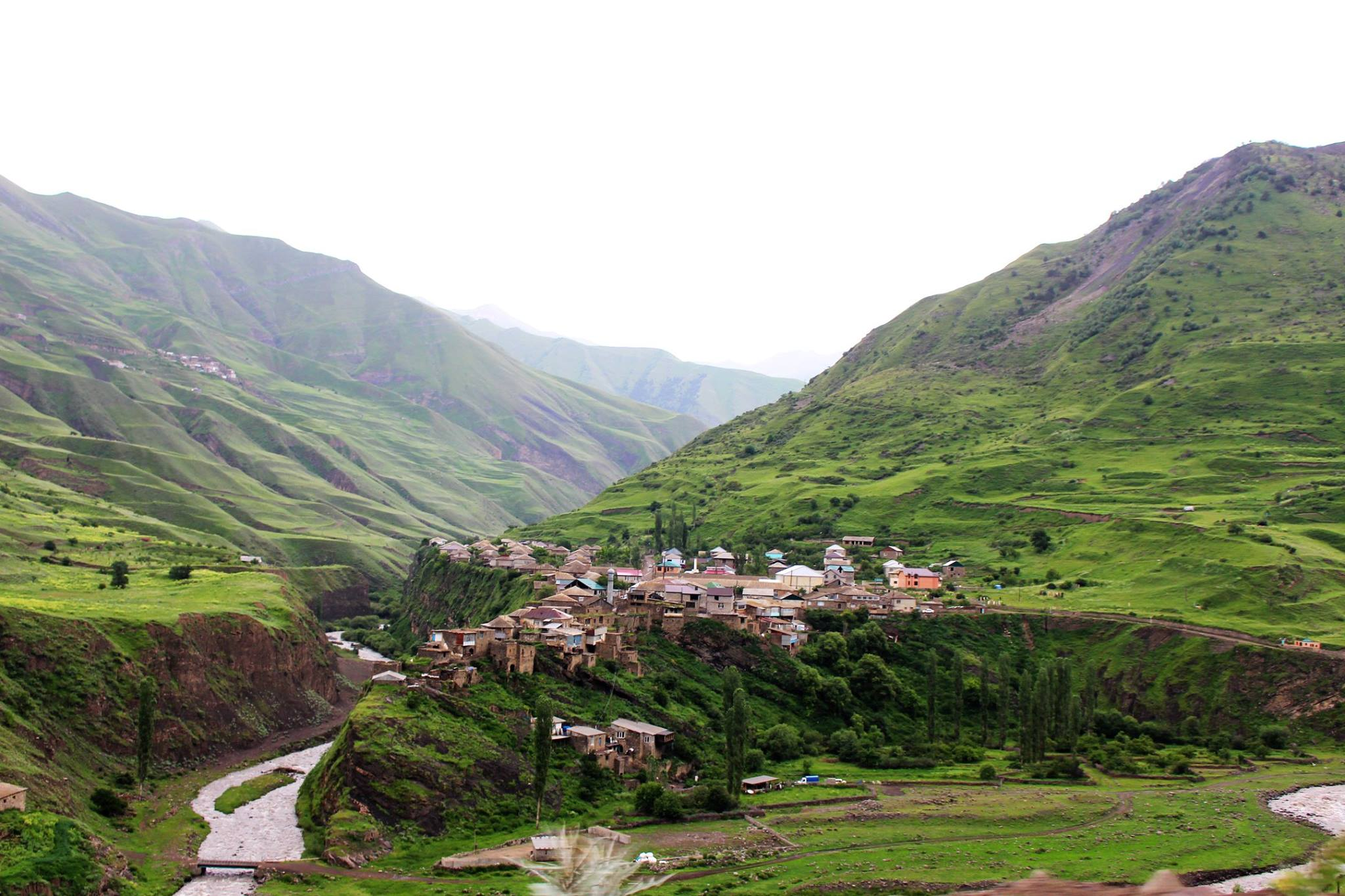

Magar (Russian: Магар) is a rural locality (a selo) in Charodinsky District, Republic of Dagestan, Russia. Population: 474 (2021 census); 336 (2002 census); 339 (1989 Soviet census). There is 1 street in this selo.

== Geography ==
Selo is located 4 km from Tsurib (the district's administrative centre), 102 km from Makhachkala (capital of Dagestan) and 1,688 km from Moscow. Tseneb is the nearest rural locality.
