= Zheleznodorozhnogo razezda No. 6 =

Zheleznodorozhnogo razezda №6 Железнодорожного разъезда № 6
- Settlement
- Location within Astrakhan Oblast Location within Russia
- Coordinates: 45°49′N 47°00′E
- Country: Russia
- Region: Astrakhan Oblast
- District: Limansky District
- Time zone: UTC+4:00

Zheleznodorozhnogo razezda №6 (Russian: Железнодорожного разъезда № 6) is a rural locality (a settlement) in Yandykovsky Selsoviet, Limansky District, Astrakhan Oblast, Russia. The population was 287 as of 2010.

== Geography ==
Zheleznodorozhnogo razezda №6 is located 17 km northwest of Liman (the district's administrative centre) by road. Yandyki is the nearest rural locality.
