= Urukh-Sota =

Urukh-Sota Урух-Сота
- Selo
- Location within Republic of Dagestan Location within Russia
- Coordinates: 42°14′N 46°40′E
- Country: Russia
- Region: Republic of Dagestan
- District: Charodinsky District
- Time zone: UTC+3:00

Urukh-Sota (Russian: Урух-Сота) is a rural locality (a selo) in Charodinsky District, Republic of Dagestan, Russia. Population: 187 (2021 census); 165 (2002 census); 153 (1989 Soviet census). There is 1 street in this selo.

== Geography ==
Selo is located 13 km from Tsurib (the district's administrative centre), 105 km from Makhachkala (capital of Dagestan) and 1,677 km from Moscow. Gochob is the nearest rural locality.
