= Karavannoye =

Karavannoye Караванное
- Selo
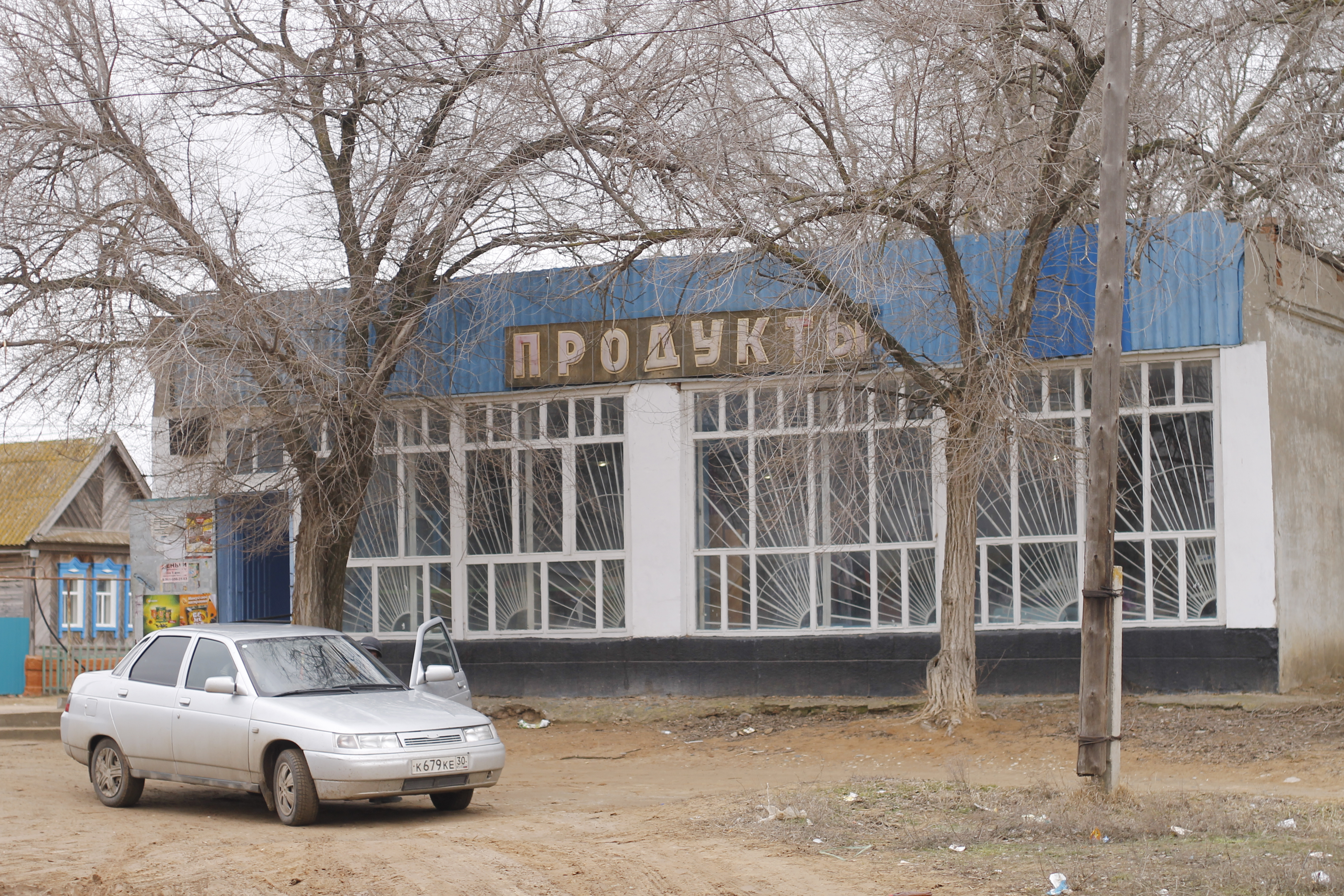

- Location within Astrakhan Oblast Location within Russia
- Coordinates: 45°59′N 47°08′E
- Country: Russia
- Region: Astrakhan Oblast
- District: Limansky District
- Time zone: UTC+4:00

Karavannoye (Russian: Караванное) is a rural locality (a selo) and the administrative center of Karavannensky Selsoviet, Limansky District, Astrakhan Oblast, Russia. The population was 1,773 as of 2010. There are ten streets.

== Geography ==
Karavannoye is located 33 km north of Liman (the district's administrative centre) by road. Mikhaylovka is the nearest rural locality.
