= Gochob =

Gochob Гочоб
- Selo
- Location within Republic of Dagestan Location within Russia
- Coordinates: 42°14′N 46°39′E
- Country: Russia
- Region: Republic of Dagestan
- District: Charodinsky District
- Time zone: UTC+3:00

Gochob (Russian: Гочоб) is a rural locality (a selo) in Charodinsky District, Republic of Dagestan, Russia. Population: 622 (2021 census); There is 1 street in this selo.

== Geography ==
Selo is located 14 km from Tsurib (the district's administrative centre), 107 km from Makhachkala (capital of Dagestan) and 1,677 km from Moscow. Urukh-Sota is the nearest rural locality.
