= Gochada =

Gochada Гочада
- Selo
- Location within Republic of Dagestan Location within Russia
- Coordinates: 42°16′N 46°45′E
- Country: Russia
- Region: Republic of Dagestan
- District: Charodinsky District
- Time zone: UTC+3:00

Gochada (Russian: Гочада) is a rural locality (a selo) in Charodinsky District, Republic of Dagestan, Russia. Population: 176 (2021 census); 165 (2002 census); 156 (1989 Soviet census).

== Geography ==
Selo is located 7 km from Tsurib (the district's administrative centre), 98 km from Makhachkala (capital of Dagestan) and 1,677 km from Moscow. Murukh is the nearest rural locality.
