= Doronub =

Doronub Доронуб
- Selo
- Location within Republic of Dagestan Location within Russia
- Coordinates: 42°07′N 46°48′E
- Country: Russia
- Region: Republic of Dagestan
- District: Charodinsky District
- Time zone: UTC+3:00

Doronub (Russian: Доронуб) is a rural locality (a selo) in Charodinsky District, Republic of Dagestan, Russia. Population: 184 (2021 census); 144 (2002 census); 95 (1989 Soviet census). There is 1 street in this selo.

== Geography ==
Selo is located 12 km from Tsurib (the district's administrative centre), 110 km from Makhachkala (capital of Dagestan) and 1,695 km from Moscow. Karanub is the nearest rural locality.
