= Zotino =

Zotino (Russian: Зотино) is the name of several rural localities in Russia:

- Zorino, Astrakhan Oblast, a selo in Limansky District of Astrakhan Oblast
- Zotino, Chelyabinsk Oblast, a selo in Bagaryaksky Selsoviet of Kaslinsky District of Chelyabinsk Oblast
- Zotino, Krasnoyarsk Krai, a selo in Zotinsky Selsoviet of Turukhansky District of Krasnoyarsk Krai
- Zotino, Kurgan Oblast, a selo in Zotinsky Selsoviet of Petukhovsky District of Kurgan Oblast
- Zotino, Nizhny Novgorod Oblast, a village in Zubilikhinsky Selsoviet of Krasnobakovsky District of Nizhny Novgorod Oblast
- Zotino, Kormilovsky District, Omsk Oblast, a village in Georgiyevsky Rural Okrug of Kormilovsky District of Omsk Oblast
- Zotino, Tyukalinsky District, Omsk Oblast, a village in Atrachinsky Rural Okrug of Tyukalinsky District of Omsk Oblast
- Zotino, Perm Krai, a village in Sivinsky District of Perm Krai
- Zotino, Udmurt Republic, a village in Erkeshevsky Selsoviet of Balezinsky District of the Udmurt Republic
