= Gilib =

Gilib Гилиб
- Selo
- Location within Republic of Dagestan Location within Russia
- Coordinates: 42°07′N 46°46′E
- Country: Russia
- Region: Republic of Dagestan
- District: Charodinsky District
- Time zone: UTC+3:00

Gilib (Russian: Гилиб) is a rural locality (a selo) in Charodinsky District, Republic of Dagestan, Russia. Population: 891 (2021 census); 562 (2002 census); 616 (1989 Soviet census). There are 3 streets in this selo.

== Geography ==
Selo is located 14 km from Tsurib (the district's administrative centre), 112 km from Makhachkala (capital of Dagestan) and 1,694 km from Moscow. Kutikh is the nearest rural locality.
