= Rynok =

Rynok Рынок
- Selo
- Location within Astrakhan Oblast Location within Russia
- Coordinates: 45°38′N 47°33′E
- Country: Russia
- Region: Astrakhan Oblast
- District: Limansky District
- Time zone: UTC+4:00

Rynok (Russian: Рынок) is a rural locality (a selo) and the administrative center of Rynkovsky Selsoviet, Limansky District, Astrakhan Oblast, Russia. The population was 193 as of 2010. There are eight streets.

== Geography ==
Rynok is located 45 km southeast of Liman (the district's administrative centre) by road. Burannoye is the nearest rural locality.
