= Mogrob =

Mogrob Могроб
- Selo
- Location within Republic of Dagestan Location within Russia
- Coordinates: 42°09′N 46°51′E
- Country: Russia
- Region: Republic of Dagestan
- District: Charodinsky District
- Time zone: UTC+3:00

Mogrob (Russian: Могроб) is a rural locality (a selo) in Charodinsky District, Republic of Dagestan, Russia. Population: 13 (2021 census); 9 (2002 census); 4 (1989 Soviet census). There is 1 street in this selo.

== Geography ==
Selo is located 9 km from Tsurib (the district's administrative centre), 104 km from Makhachkala (capital of Dagestan) and 1,693 km from Moscow. Chvadab is the nearest rural locality.
