= Kalib, Republic of Dagestan =

Kalib Калиб
- Selo
- Location within Republic of Dagestan Location within Russia
- Coordinates: 42°04′N 46°51′E
- Country: Russia
- Region: Republic of Dagestan
- District: Charodinsky District
- Time zone: UTC+3:00

Kalib (Russian: Калиб) is a rural locality (a selo) in Charodinsky District, Republic of Dagestan, Russia. Population: 19 (2002 census); 41 (1989 Soviet census).

== Geography ==
Selo is located 18 km from Tsurib (the district's administrative centre), 113 km from Makhachkala (capital of Dagestan) and 1,702 km from Moscow. Archib is the nearest rural locality.
