= Voskresensk =

Voskresensk (Russian: Воскресенск) is the name of several inhabited localities in Russia.

== Modern localities ==
Urban localities

- Voskresensk, Moscow Oblast, a town in Voskresensky District of Moscow Oblast

Rural localities

- Voskresensk, Kaluga Oblast, a selo in Kirovsky District of Kaluga Oblast
- Voskresensk, Perm Krai, a selo in Karagaysky District of Perm Krai

== Renamed localities ==
- Voskresensk, the name of the town of Istra, Moscow Oblast before 1930

== Alternative names ==
- Voskresensk, alternative name of Voskresenovka, a selo in Voskresenovsky Selsoviet of Limansky District in Astrakhan Oblast; 45°37′N 47°32′E
- Voskresensk, alternative name of Voskresenskoye, a village in Khvalovskoye Settlement Municipal Formation of Volkhovsky District in Leningrad Oblast; 59°51′N 32°55′E
