= Kutikh =

Kutikh Кутих
- Selo
- Location within Republic of Dagestan Location within Russia
- Coordinates: 42°07′N 46°47′E
- Country: Russia
- Region: Republic of Dagestan
- District: Charodinsky District
- Time zone: UTC+3:00

Kutikh (Russian: Кутих) is a rural locality (a selo) in Charodinsky District, Republic of Dagestan, Russia. Population: 154 (2021 census); 214 (2002 census); 205 (1989 Soviet census). There is one street in this selo.

== Geography ==
Selo is located 13 km from Tsurib (the district's administrative centre), 111 km from Makhachkala (capital of Dagestan) and 1,694 km from Moscow. Gilib is the nearest rural locality.
