= Kryazhevoye =

Kryazhevoye Кряжевое
- Selo
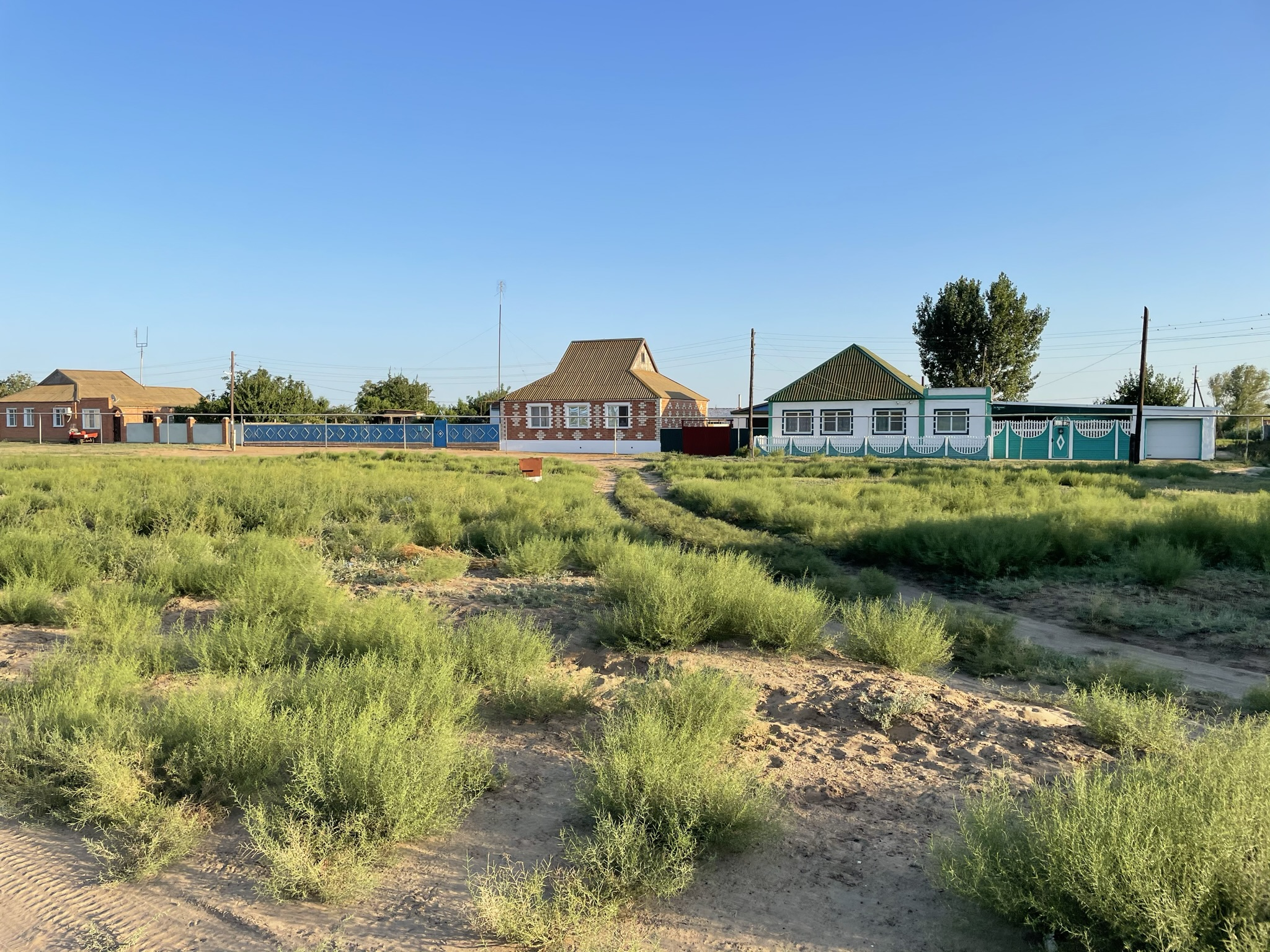
- Pochtovaya Street in Kryazhevoye

- Location within Astrakhan Oblast Location within Russia
- Coordinates: 45°51′N 47°31′E
- Country: Russia
- Region: Astrakhan Oblast
- District: Limansky District
- Time zone: UTC+4:00

Kryazhevoye (Russian: Кряжевое) is a rural locality (a selo) and the administrative center of Kryazhevinsky Selsoviet, Limansky District, Astrakhan Oblast, Russia. The population was 658 as of 2010. There are 12 streets.

== Geography ==
Kryazhevoye is located 28 km northeast of Liman (the district's administrative centre) by road. Oranzherei is the nearest rural locality.
