= Zoran (disambiguation) =

Zoran is a masculine South Slavic name.

Zoran may also refer to:

- Zoran or Tzoran, an Israeli town, now part of Kadima-Zoran
- Zoran Corporation, a digital entertainment and digital imaging semiconductor company
- Zoran (designer), the professional name of fashion designer Zoran Ladicorbic (born 1947)

== See also ==
- Zorin (disambiguation)
