= Mahomedov =

Mahomedov is a surname. Notable people with the surname include:

- Musa Mahomedov (born 1970), Avar-born Ukrainian entrepreneur
- Rufat Mahomedov (born 1992), Ukrainian judoka
