= Moshob =

Moshob Мошоб
- Selo
- Location within Republic of Dagestan Location within Russia
- Coordinates: 42°13′N 46°48′E
- Country: Russia
- Region: Republic of Dagestan
- District: Charodinsky District
- Time zone: UTC+3:00

Moshob (Russian: Мошоб) is a rural locality (a selo) in Charodinsky District, Republic of Dagestan, Russia. Population: 41 (2021 census); 36 (2002 census); 38 (1989 Soviet census). There is 1 street in this selo.

== Geography ==
Selo is located 2 km from Tsurib (the district's administrative centre), 101 km from Makhachkala (capital of Dagestan) and 1,684 km from Moscow. Sodab is the nearest rural locality.
