= Yar-Bazar =

Yar-Bazar Яр-Базар
- Selo
- Location within Astrakhan Oblast Location within Russia
- Coordinates: 45°57′N 47°29′E
- Country: Russia
- Region: Astrakhan Oblast
- District: Limansky District
- Time zone: UTC+4:00

Yar-Bazar (Russian: Яр-Базар) is a rural locality (a selo) in Kamyshovsky Selsoviet, Limansky District, Astrakhan Oblast, Russia. The population was 256 as of 2010. There are 5 streets.

== Geography ==
Yar-Bazar is located 38 km northeast of Liman (the district's administrative centre) by road. Zorino is the nearest rural locality.
