= Ukrainian recognition of the Chechen Republic of Ichkeria =

2022 Ukrainian parliamentary bill

Recognition of Chechnya as Temporarily Occupied

Verkhovna Rada
- Long title: Resolution on the recognition of the Chechen Republic of Ichkeria as Temporarily Occupied by the Russian Federation
- Considered by: Verkhovna Rada

Legislative history
- Passed: 18 October 2022
- Status: Unknown

The resolution on recognition of the state sovereignty of the Chechen Republic of Ichkeria was a bill proposed by Oleksiy Honcharenko and Musa Mahomedov in which the Verkhovna Rada, the Ukrainian parliament, would have voted on the recognition of Chechnya's independence, in response to Russia's recognition of the Luhansk People's Republic and the Donetsk People's Republic.

The bill was eventually withdrawn, but a second resolution was approved which recognized Chechnya as "temporarily occupied" by Russia.

== Timeline ==
The original resolution was received by the Verkhovna Rada on 11 July 2022 and handed over to the leadership on the same day. It was sent to the committee for consideration on the 13 July and was provided for reference on 14 July. This resolution was eventually withdrawn from consideration in September 2023.

On 18 October 2022 a second resolution was put forward in the Rada, which recognized Chechnya as temporarily occupied by Russian Federation. The resolution also condemned Russia's genocide of the Chechen people. This resolution was approved the same day. Members of all political parties and factions voted for the decision, though every party also had deputies who did not vote on the resolution. No deputies voted against.

In early November, Zelenskyy responded to the Verkhovna Rada's vote and a petition with 25,000 signatures by ordering the Ukrainian Ministry of Foreign Affairs to research if, how, and in which form Ukraine could recognize the Chechen Republic of Ichkeria. He emphasized that it was the Ukrainian President's prerogative to extend full diplomatic recognition to other states.

On November 9, 2022, the Verkhovna Rada of Ukraine also registered a draft resolution on the recognition of state sovereignty and independence of Tatarstan.

On 8 August 2023, the chair of the Committee for Foreign Policy of Ukraine, Oleksandr Merezhko of the Servant of the People party, declared to the press that Ukraine was considering to recognize Kosovo after the war is over.

== Reactions ==
- (Russia) — On 13 July, Ramzan Kadyrov, the head of Chechnya, called the draft resolution "absolutely ridiculous and absurd" and recalled that "Ichkeria does not exist even on paper" and added "It was liquidated by the former Ichkerians themselves, who announced in 2007 the abolition of Ichkeria and the creation of the so-called Imarat Kavkaz".

== See also ==
- Estonia–Ichkeria relations
