= Vyshka, Astrakhan Oblast =

Vyshka Вышка
- Selo
- Location within Astrakhan Oblast Location within Russia
- Coordinates: 45°36′N 47°38′E
- Country: Russia
- Region: Astrakhan Oblast
- District: Limansky District
- Time zone: UTC+4:00

Vyshka (Russian: Вышка) is a rural locality (a selo) in Rynkovsky Selsoviet, Limansky District, Astrakhan Oblast, Russia. The population was 189 as of 2010. There are 4 streets.

== Geography ==
Vyshka is located 53 km southeast of Liman (the district's administrative centre) by road. Rynok is the nearest rural locality.
