= Nukush =

Nukush Нукуш
- Selo
- Location within Republic of Dagestan Location within Russia
- Coordinates: 42°08′N 46°48′E
- Country: Russia
- Region: Republic of Dagestan
- District: Charodinsky District
- Time zone: UTC+3:00

Nukush (Russian: Нукуш) is a rural locality (a selo) in Charodinsky District, Republic of Dagestan, Russia. Population: 200 (2021 census); 200 (2002 census); 200 (1989 Soviet census). There is 1 street in this selo.

== Geography ==
Selo is located 10 km from Tsurib (the district's administrative centre), 108 km from Makhachkala (capital of Dagestan) and 1,692 km from Moscow. Irib is the nearest rural locality.
