= Zorino, Astrakhan Oblast =

Zorino Зорино
- Selo
- Location within Astrakhan Oblast Location within Russia
- Coordinates: 45°57′N 47°30′E
- Country: Russia
- Region: Astrakhan Oblast
- District: Limansky District
- Time zone: UTC+4:00

Zorino (Russian: Зорино) is a rural locality (a selo) in Kamyshovsky Selsoviet, Limansky District, Astrakhan Oblast, Russia. The population was 35 as of 2010. There are 2 streets.

== Geography ==
Zorino is located 53 km northeast of Liman (the district's administrative centre) by road. Yar-Bazar is the nearest rural locality.
