= Sumeta =

Sumeta Сумета
- Selo
- Location within Republic of Dagestan Location within Russia
- Coordinates: 42°15′N 46°42′E
- Country: Russia
- Region: Republic of Dagestan
- District: Charodinsky District
- Time zone: UTC+3:00

Sumeta (Russian: Сумета) is a rural locality (a selo) in Charodinsky District, Republic of Dagestan, Russia. Population: 41 (2021 census); 42 (2002 census); 55 (1989 Soviet census). There is 1 street in this selo.

== Geography ==
Selo is located 11 km from Tsurib (the district's administrative centre), 102 km from Makhachkala (capital of Dagestan) and 1,676 km from Moscow. Sok is the nearest rural locality.
