= Dusrakh =

Dusrakh Дусрах
- Selo
- Location within Republic of Dagestan Location within Russia
- Coordinates: 42°07′N 46°52′E
- Country: Russia
- Region: Republic of Dagestan
- District: Charodinsky District
- Time zone: UTC+3:00

Dusrakh (Russian: Дусрах) is a rural locality (a selo) in Charodinsky District, Republic of Dagestan, Russia. Population: 369 (2021 census); 258 (2002 census); 297 (1989 Soviet census). There are 2 streets in this selo.

== Geography ==
Selo is located 13 km from Tsurib (the district's administrative centre), 107 km from Makhachkala (capital of Dagestan) and 1,697 km from Moscow. Kosroda is the nearest rural locality.
