= Anti-Chechen sentiment =

Dislike, hatred or fear towards ethnic Chechens

Anti-Chechen sentiment, Chechenophobia, anti-Chechenism, or Nokhchophobia, refers to fear, dislike, hostility, chauvinism and xenophobia towards ethnic Chechens, the Chechen language, or the Chechen culture in general. Anti-Chechen sentiment has been historically strong in Russia, and to some degree has spread to other countries in the former Soviet Union, such as Azerbaijan, to Europe (Poland, France), the Middle East (Syria, Israel), and to the United States. For decades, the main causes of hatred against Chechens have been mostly due to violent mentality of Chechens, the association of Chechens with Islamic extremism, and Russian imperialist propaganda targeted at Chechens.

== By country ==
=== Azerbaijan ===
Historically, Azerbaijan has been seen as welcoming to Chechens, and during the 1990s there was strong mutual respect between Chechens and Azerbaijanis. The Chechens volunteered to fight for Azerbaijan against Armenia in Karabakh, while Azerbaijan welcomed Chechen refugees fleeing war in their homeland. However, increasing adherence to the Salafi movement by many Chechens, combined with the involvement of Chechens in kidnapping and mass murder, caused the public perception of Chechens to deteriorate in Azerbaijan, which is Shia-majority and has a secular environment.

=== France ===
French right-wing politicians, many of whom have pro-Russian sentiments, expressed anti-Chechen statements, such as Éric Zemmour, who called Chechen children "terrorists, rapists, thieves".

=== Georgia ===
Georgia hosts a large Chechen population in the Pankisi Gorge, a region which has suffered from poverty. Xenophobia increased due to the tise of radical Islamism. The Pankisi Gorge crisis in the early 2000s led to a stereotype of Chechens as terrorists and jihadists.

=== Israel ===
Due to Chechen sympathies with Palestinians, there is hostility against Chechens in Israel. After Beitar Jerusalem F.C. signed two Chechen Muslim players, Zaur Sadayev and Dzhabrail Kadiyev in 2013, supporters opposed the move with phone calls to the team, protest signs, chants, walkouts, and other hooliganism. Fans also stated that it was not racist to hate Chechens or Muslims. A film, Forever Pure, was made about the controversy.

=== Poland ===
Poland welcomed Chechen refugees during the 1990s in support of the Chechen quest to regain freedom from Russia. However, since the 2010s, especially with the rise of the far-right wing party Law and Justice and increasing Islamic terrorism in Europe, the Polish attitude toward Chechens had become increasingly negative. Some have blamed Chechens for inflaming terrorist attacks due to their Islamic belief, notably the Polish interior minister Mariusz Błaszczak in 2016, who accused the Chechens of being terrorists. This was followed by the increasing denial of Chechen asylum seekers, with thousands of Chechens fleeing Russia forcibly sent back by Polish authorities in 2015 and 2016. The anti-Chechen policy by the Polish government has been criticized by the European Union, of which Poland is a member, and the European Court of Human Rights, which ruled in 2020 against Poland for perceived Chechenophobia by the Polish authorities.

=== Russia ===
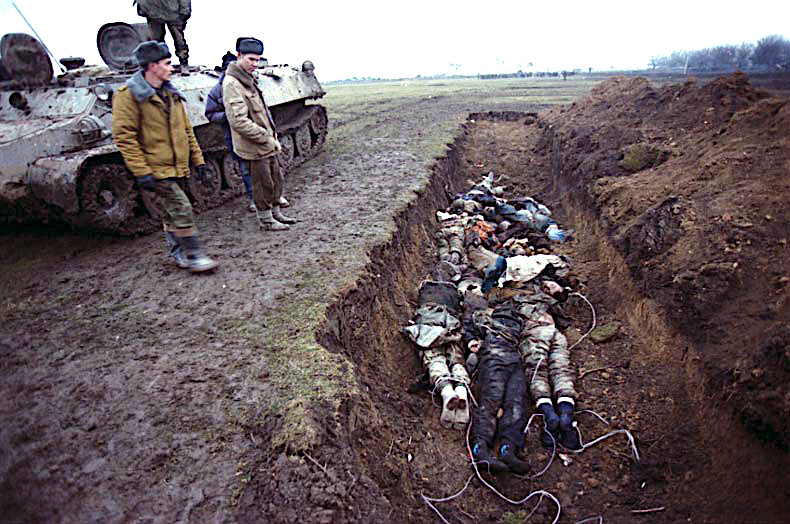
A mass grave in Chechnya during the Second Chechen War. Chechen exiles accused the Russian military of committing genocide.

Fear and negative stereotypes of Chechens stem largely from the history of the Russian conquest of Chechnya and Dagestan, when Russia conquered the Chechen territory in 1859 and merged it with the Russian Empire. Russian general Aleksey Yermolov openly disliked Chechens, who considered them bold and dangerous, and called for mass genocide of the Chechens due to their resistance against Russia. Eventually, when Russia absorbed Chechnya into its territory, mass ethnic cleansing of Chechens occurred in the 1860s.

Due to the Chechens' refusal to accept Russian rule, a number of violent conflicts erupted in Chechnya in an attempt to free Chechnya from Russia. This was often met with brutal reprisals by the Russian authorities, such as the bloody repression of Chechens in 1932 by the Soviet military. During World War II, the Soviet authorities blamed Chechens for supporting Nazi Germany, resulting with the tragic Aardakh in which many Chechens were deported to Siberia and Central Asia, with many dying on the journey. These tensions were superseded by ethnic conflict in the 1950s and 1960s where Russians and Chechens clashed in Grozny. Soviet authorities generally sided with Russians against Chechens.

The conflict between Chechens and Russians reached its peak when the Soviet Union collapsed in 1991, and Chechen nationalists, led by Dzhokhar Dudayev, proclaimed the Chechen Republic of Ichkeria and sought to separate from Russia, causing the First and Second Chechen Wars. The Russian military responded harshly against ethnic Chechens, especially in the second war where an estimated thousand or more Chechen civilians were killed by the Russian military.

Ethnic violence between Russians and Chechens was common in 2000s, due to alleged Chechen links with Islamic terrorism, leading to an increased number of racist killings against Chechens. In 2007, 18-year-old Artur Ryno claimed responsibility for 37 racially motivated murders in one year, saying that "since school [he] hated people from the Caucasus." On 5 June 2007, an anti-Chechen riot involving hundreds of people took place in the town of Stavropol in southern Russia. Rioters demanded the eviction of ethnic Chechens following the murder of two young Russians who locals believed were killed by Chechens. The event revived memories of a recent clash between Chechens and local Russians in Kondopoga which started when two Russians were killed over an unpaid bill. Chechens in the Russian Armed Forces have also faced frequent violent activities against them by Russian military instructors.

==== Astrakhan ====
In August 2005 there was a series of clashes in the Limansky District of Astrakhan Oblast between Chechen migrant workers and native Kalmyks and Russians due to vandalism of Russian graves and the death of a Kalmyk youth attempting to prevent said vandalism. A pogrom was committed in reprisal by the Russians and Kalmyks targeting Chechen houses and cars which resulting in several Chechens being hospitalized.

==== North Ossetia ====
In North Ossetia–Alania, during the East Prigorodny Conflict of the 1990s, ethnic Ossetian militia groups, many supported by the Russian government, committed ethnic cleansing of Ingush; a close relative of the Chechens, as well as the Chechens themselves, due to Chechen support for Ingush against Ossetians.

=== Syria ===
Chechens and most other non-Arab ethnicities in Syria endured repression by the Ba'athist Syrian regime, making it harder to preserve their cultural heritage. The Assad family alliance with Russia, as well as Chechen-Syrian support for the Syrian opposition, had led to increased antagonism against Chechens during the Syrian Civil War.

=== United States ===
Following the Boston Marathon bombing by two Chechen immigrants, anti-Chechen sentiment and Islamophobia increased in the United States. Many Chechen-Americans had expressed fear of reprisals and racism from American nationalists.

=== Kazakhstan ===
In 2007, a major ethnic violence broke out in southern Kazakhstan's Almaty Region after disputes between Kazakhs and Chechens erupted into a major brawl, killing three people.

== See also ==
- Islamophobia
- Racism in Russia
- Chechen genocide
