= Keserib =

Keserib Кесериб
- Selo
- Location within Republic of Dagestan Location within Russia
- Coordinates: 42°03′N 46°52′E
- Country: Russia
- Region: Republic of Dagestan
- District: Charodinsky District
- Time zone: UTC+3:00

Keserib (Russian: Кесериб) is a rural locality (a selo) in Charodinsky District, Republic of Dagestan, Russia. Population: 129 (2021 census); 136 (2002 census); 108 (1989 Soviet census). There is 1 street in this selo.

== Geography ==
Selo is located 19 km from Tsurib (the district's administrative centre), 113 km from Makhachkala (capital of Dagestan) and 1,703 km from Moscow. Khilikh is the nearest rural locality.
