= Mukutl =

Mukutl Мукутль
- Selo
- Location within Republic of Dagestan Location within Russia
- Coordinates: 42°11′N 46°51′E
- Country: Russia
- Region: Republic of Dagestan
- District: Charodinsky District
- Time zone: UTC+3:00

Mukutl (Russian: Мукутль) is a rural locality (a selo) in Charodinsky District, Republic of Dagestan, Russia. Population: 159 (2021 census); 142 (2002 census); 118 (1989 Soviet census).

== Geography ==
Selo is located 5 km from Tsurib (the district's administrative centre), 101 km from Makhachkala (capital of Dagestan) and 1,689 km from Moscow. Khetsub is the nearest rural locality.
