= Limansky clashes =

- Part of Second Chechen War
- Date: August 15–18, 2005 (4 days)
- Location: Yandyki; 45°46′N 47°07′E
- Caused by: Anti-Chechen sentiment
- Goals: Remove the Chechen minority from Yandyki
- Methods: Pogrom

Parties
Astrakhan Cossacks; Kalmyks	Chechens

Lead figures
Anatoly Bagiev	Kuri Khusainov

Number
200+	Several dozen

Casualties and losses
1 killed	several dozen injured

Casualties
- Detained: 1
- Charged: 1

In 2005 the village of Yandyki in the Limansky District of the Astrakhan Oblast became the center of a series of clashes between local Russians and Chechen migrant workers which culminated in a pogrom against the Chechens, after the death of a Kalmyk.

== Background ==
Yandyki, or sometimes Yandykov, is a village 9 km (5.6 mi) from Liman in the south-west of Astrakhan Oblast. At the time of the incident, the village's population numbered 3.5 thousand with 11% of the population being ethnic Kalmyks while 9% of the village's population consisted of ethnic Chechen migrant workers. The rest of the village's population, besides a small Tartar and Kazakh population, is predominately Russian, who self-identify as Astrakhan Cossacks.

Although the village had a marginal Chechen presence since the 1970s when a family had moved in as cattle farmers, the vast majority of the village's Chechen population had moved fleeing the Chechen wars as well as from economic hardships in Chechnya. Both of the village's bars where owned and operated by Chechens. Due to lack of work in the village, many of the youths would join local roving gangs, that would oftentimes engage in street battles, which the Russian NGO Memorial pointed out as the likely starting point for the clashes as the gangs often fell along ethnic lines.

Additionally, Memorial also cited heightened Anti-Chechen sentiment due to the ongoing Insurgency in the North Caucasus, with local Cossack officials calling the Chechen population "temporary guests" on Cossack land who also viewed them as a threat to a proposed oil-pipeline through the region due to fears of Wahhabism. Despite this there is no evidence that any of the Chechens in Yandyki supported Wahhabism, as they had fled the Wahhabist governed Chechnya for Russia.

There was a heightened sectarian nature between ethnic groups in Yandyki, with local authorities doing little to intervene, often choosing not to investigate sectarian crimes such as complaints from Russians that Chechens “insulted the Russian girl” and from Chechens complaining that Russians “beat the Chechen.”

== Events ==
The conflict started after a series of Russian Orthodox Cross graves in the local cemetery where vandalized from 21 to 22 February 2005, alongside the grave was a newly built monument to Eduard Kokmadjiev, a local Kalmyk that had died in the Chechen wars. Three youths; Isa Magomadov, Adlan Khaladov, and Yusup Abubakarov, all Chechen immigrants, were arrested and tried under article 244 part 2 (Note: “abuse of the bodies of the deceased and the places of burial of a group of persons”) of the local criminal code. Starting on February 27 a large group of Kalmyks began to gather and guard the cemetery at night and met with Cossack leaders who proposed deporting all Chechens from the village. The older generation of the Yandyk Chechens meanwhile attempted denounce the efforts by the youths and paid for all the damages and sponsored restoration efforts. On 6 May 2005, following a guilty plea, all three of the convinced where sentenced to a half-year in prison while the prosecutor's office attempted to appeal the ruling for being too lenient.

On the evening of August 10, Ibrahim Khaladov, Adlan's brother, was beaten in the village. According to local residents, he boasted that he would be able to pay off any court. The Khaladovs attempted to press charges, however, the police refused to investigate the case. The next evening, August 11, a Chechen gang attempted to "revenge" Ibrahim and beat those who had beaten Ibrahim, none of them went to the hospital, nor did any of them attempt to file charges. The older Chechens then attempted to police their own community, with community leader, Kuri Khusainov, an older Chechen who ran the collectivized farm most Chechens worked on, coordinating with elders to try and break up gangs, and keeping all children at home at night.

Despite this, on the evening of August 15 a group of 130 youths, Russian, Chechen, and Kalmyk, participated in a gang fight. Afterwards, in the morning of August 16, Khusainov petitioned the head of the rural administration Sergey Vladimirovich Sobolev, to intervene to prevent further clashes, Sobolev did nothing. Later that evening another large gang fight numbering several dozen participants took place, this time with lines of local village police on the edge, during which a Kalmyk youth named Nikolai Boldyrev was killed from a point blank pistol round.

After Boldyrev died the local police broke ranks and began to search every Chechen house in the village without warrant or cause, arresting some 14 Chechens on the charges of murder, conspiracy, and hooliganism. Afterwards more police from Astrakhan where sent to the village, and during the funeral for Boldyrev on August 18 the leader of the local Cossacks gave a speech, most of the 200 or so in attendance where not from Yandyki.

The masked crowd made their way through the village and burned all Chechen homes, and beat all Chechens they could get their hands on, including Khusainov. Behind the crowd was a firetruck that was there to extinguish fires that spread from the Chechens houses to Russian houses. There was at least one incident of a child running out of a burning house, just for the crowd to try and throw them back in. The Russian Ministry of Internal Affairs stated that they could have dispersed the crowd and prevented the pogrom, but chose not to "shoot into the crowd" to "prevent further harm." Despite that, some of the local police hid most of the village's Chechens in a local club.

== Aftermath ==
Later in the day on August 18 the local authorities opened criminal proceedings for rioting, however, no arrests were made despite substantial video evidence of several unmasked participants.

By August 19 the governor of Astrakhan Oblast announced that the situation was under control via a press-release.

Most Russian media outlets presented the conflict as that between "Chechens and Kalmyks" despite the majority of participants in the pogrom being Russians.

The Russian NGO Memorial sent a fact finding mission to Yandyki to determine the cause and course of events of the pogrom.

On August 31 the deputy of the local ROVD unit was dismissed for failing to stop the riot.

Only a single participant in the riot was arrested and tried by Russia, Anatoly Bagiev, who was ultimately sentenced to seven years in prison for participating in mass riots and for calling for active disobedience to the legitimate demands of government officials.

== See also ==
- Chechen–Russian conflict
- Anti-Chechen sentiment
