= Voskresenovka, Astrakhan Oblast =

Voskresenovka Воскресеновка
- Selo
- Location within Astrakhan Oblast Location within Russia
- Coordinates: 45°36′N 47°31′E
- Country: Russia
- Region: Astrakhan Oblast
- District: Limansky District
- Time zone: UTC+4:00

Voskresenovka (Russian: Воскресеновка) is a rural locality (a selo) and the administrative center of Voskresenovsky Selsoviet, Limansky District, Astrakhan Oblast, Russia. The population was 257 as of 2010. There are 2 streets.

== Geography ==
Voskresenovka is located 44 km southeast of Liman (the district's administrative centre) by road. Burannoye is the nearest rural locality.
