= Tsulda =

Tsulda Цулда
- Selo
- Location within Republic of Dagestan Location within Russia
- Coordinates: 42°16′N 46°43′E
- Country: Russia
- Region: Republic of Dagestan
- District: Charodinsky District
- Time zone: UTC+3:00

Tsulda (Russian: Цулда) is a rural locality (a selo) in Charodinsky District, Republic of Dagestan, Russia. Population: 317 (2021 census); 261 (2002 census); 223 (1989 Soviet census). There is 1 street in this selo.

== Geography ==
Selo is located 10 km from Tsurib (the district's administrative centre), 100 km from Makhachkala (capital of Dagestan) and 1,676 km from Moscow. Gontlob is the nearest rural locality.
