= Murukh =

Murukh Мурух
- Selo
- Location within Republic of Dagestan Location within Russia
- Coordinates: 42°16′N 46°46′E
- Country: Russia
- Region: Republic of Dagestan
- District: Charodinsky District
- Time zone: UTC+3:00

Murukh (Russian: Мурух) is a rural locality (a selo) in Charodinsky District, Republic of Dagestan, Russia. Population: 71 (2021 census); 96 (2002 census); 53 (1989 Soviet census). There is 1 street in this selo.

== Geography ==
Selo is located 7 km from Tsurib (the district's administrative centre), 98 km from Makhachkala (capital of Dagestan) and 1,677 km from Moscow. Gochada is the nearest rural locality.
