= Estonia–Ichkeria relations =

Diplomatic relations between Chechen and the Republic of Estonia

Relations and contacts between Estonia and Ichkeria (or Chechnya) have historically been, and are, very friendly (even if limited) due to the two peoples having similar experiences and perceiving a common foe, be it Russian Empire, the Soviet Union or the modern Russian Federation. The Estonian people and the Chechen people, in addition to actively helping each other's covert activities against Moscow, have at various times borrowed tactics and ideologies from each other (usually from Estonia to Chechnya).

== Dzhokhar Dudayev, first modern Chechen president, and his relation to Estonia ==
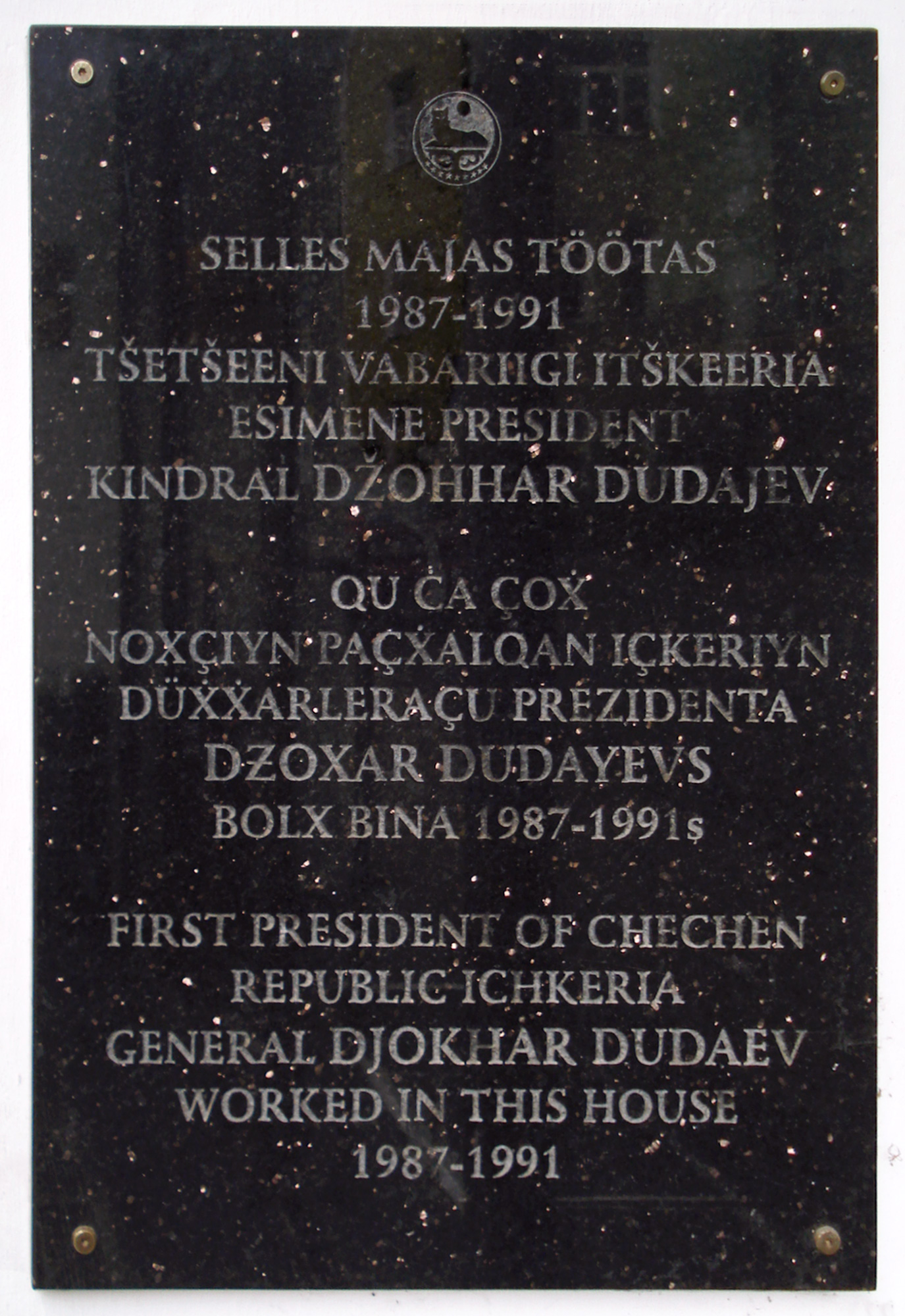
Memorial plaque in Tartu to Dzhokhar Dudayev. Estonians still feel grateful for Dudayev's actions, saving many people from massacre by the Soviet troops

Dzhokhar Dudayev, before becoming the first president of Ichkeria after winning the democratic election in a landslide had been the commander of the 23rd Strategic Bomber Division in Tartu. In Tartu, Dudayev learned the Estonian language and spent countless hours learning about Estonian and Finnish history, and is thought by some to be an Estophile (a classification given to many Western-minded Chechens). Colonel Ants Laaneots remembers talking to Dudayev when they were wearing civilian clothes in a cafe and discovering that Dudayev was strongly sympathetic to Estonia.

Dudayev soon moved from a passive sympathy for Estonia to somewhat more active stance. In early 1990, he ordered his troops to stay out of sight and not interfere with street protests. Dudayev received the order to crush Estonia's independence from the Kremlin in Moscow (as part of a greater plan to smash the increasing autonomy of the Baltic States in general). However, he rejected this, voicing his criticism of the Kremlin and support for the Estonian people in both Russian and Estonian. He declared that he would never "let Soviet planes land on Estonian soil".

When the Kremlin ordered Dudayev to use his troops to crush the independence movement of Estonia, Dudayev not only refused the order. He completely withdrew his battalion, and then quit the Red Army. He then returned to his homeland, viewed as a hero already in both Chechnya and Estonia.

== Estonian recognition of the Chechen Republic of Ichkeria ==
Estonia and the Chechen Republic of Ichkeria were initially both members of UNPO, working together for a common goal- the establishment of "self-determination" of all UNPO members, as designated by UNPO's declaration.

Estonia, seeing parallels in its own struggle and that of Ichkeria, moved to recognize Chechnya in the early 1990s, a step Georgia had already taken under Gamsakhurdia. The Estonian president gave a speech in support of Chechnya and this spurred similar discussions in Finland, the other Baltic countries and Poland. The Estonian parliament soon moved to recognize Chechnya, but the bill was stopped short due to pressure from Russia and from pro-Russian elements within the EU.

Estonia nonetheless set up a representative office for the Chechen Republic of Ichkeria to use. This office is still in use and Imran Ahayev is the current representative.

Despite being forced to not recognize Ichkeria's independence, some Estonian politicians occasionally still refer to Ichkeria positively when interviewed by foreigners. For example, in a 2008 interview, when asked about the roots of the independence movement, president Ilves said that "In Chechnya the national feeling sprang from the same source."

Faced with the onslaught of Russian invasion, Estonia was one of the countries that the "Ichkerians" felt they could turn to. In January–February 1995, through the UNPO Coordination Office in Tartu (Estonia), the Chechen diaspora, with help from others, organized a petition to get Estonian parliament to reconsider the recognition bill. Over three thousand people signed. On the 28th and 29 April that year, PMs (particularly those of pro-Chechen orientation) in Estonia, Lithuania, Ukraine, as well as representatives of Ichkeria and the Ingrian Finns held a two-day seminar on the right of Chechens to independence. However, largely, these efforts resulted in nothing, due to UNPO's lack of prestige. Nonetheless, after the Chechen victory in the First Chechen War, Estonian UNPO coordinator Linnart Mäll led a delegation to observe the election, afterword declaring it "free and fair" (as did the OSCE, the US, and even the Russian Federation at that time).

In 2010, a group of Estonian parliamentarians created a group called "In Defense of Human Rights in the North Caucasus", which aims to draw attention in Europe to human rights violations in the North Caucasus, with most extensive reference being made to Chechnya.

== See also ==
- Estonia–Russia relations
- Ukrainian recognition of the Chechen Republic of Ichkeria
