= Zorin =

Zorin may refer to:

== People ==
- Andrei Zorin (born 1997), Russian footballer
- Leonid Zorin, (1924–2020), Russian playwright
- Sergey Zorin (1891–1937), Soviet politician
- Simcha Zorin (1902–1974), Soviet Jewish partisan in World War II
- Valentin Zorin (1925–2016), Russian author
- Valerian Zorin (1902–1986), Soviet diplomat
- Yuriy Zorin (born 1947), Russian athlete

== Other uses ==
- Max Zorin, a fictional James Bond character
- Zorin Blitz, a fictional Nazi vampire from Hellsing, a manga by Kouta Hirano
- Zorin OS, a Linux distribution based on Ubuntu

== See also ==
- Vera Zorina (1917–2003), Norwegian ballerina and actress
- Zorino, Astrakhan Oblast
