= 1958 Grozny riots =

The Grozny riots of 1958 occurred between 23 and 27 August that year in Grozny (Soviet Union). Although beginning as a small-scale event, it turned a major event in the history of the city, of Chechnya and of Russo-Chechen relations, starting a series of ethnic riots, to continue until 1965.

== Immediate and long-term causes ==
The riots were provoked by the killing of one Russian by an Ingush. The Russian, a sailor, had asked an Ingush woman to dance and tried to seduce her, but an Ingush man who was engaged to her intervened and the ensuing confrontation escalated into a brawl in which the Russian ended up dead.

However, the real motive of the riots was inter-ethnic conflict between the Russians and Chechen returnees from deportation to Central Asia, most of whom were unemployed, as the Soviet rule did nothing to settle differences. The Russians had been living in the Grozny Oblast for 13 years before they returned in 1957 and resented their return, as they had been living in Vainakh houses on Vainakh land and doing jobs that had been done by Vainakh before the deportation. The return of the Vainakh (Chechens and Ingush) caused competition between the two groups over housing and jobs, which was overlaid with historical animosities, quickly escalating. Vainakh (especially Chechens) viewed Russians not only as oppressors but also as illegitimate interlopers living on stolen land. Russians meanwhile viewed Vainakh as being less than them, and furthermore as subversive agents of Turkish interests. Thus, the brawl and the death of the one Russian sailor was only the spark that lit the fuse leading to the formation of the Russian mob that rioted.

== Events ==
=== Demands to authorities by Russian gathering ===
The riot started initially as an armed gathering of Russians following the funeral for the death of the Russian sailor. 10,000 Russians assembled in the main square of Grozny.

A Russian female who claimed she had formerly been a member of the regional party committee and the Council of Ministers stood up and voiced the Russians' demands. They included the establishment of "Russian power", a mass search and disarming of all Chechens and Ingush (with those found with weapons to be shot on spot) and then the re-expulsion of the Chechens and Ingush.

On August 27 (the fifth day of the riot), a number of Russians made the following proposal to the Communist authorities:

Taking into consideration the appearance of a savage attitude by the side of the Chechen-Ingush population towards the people of other nationalities, as expressing itself in massacre, murders, violence and harassment, the working people of the town of Grozny in the name of the majority of the population propose:

- 1. Since 27 August, to rename the CI ASSR into Grozny Oblast or be it then Multinational Soviet Socialist Republic.
- 2. In the Grozny Oblast, Chechen-Ingush population is not to be permitted to exceed 10% of the whole population.
- 3. To transfer from other republics the front line, progressive Komsomol youth of different nationalities in order to develop the riches of the Grozny Oblast and to develop the agriculture.
- 4. Since 27 August 1958 to abolish all Chechen-Ingush population's privileges vis-à-vis other nationalities.

On the 27th, Major General Stepanov of the Military Aviation School issued an ultimatum to the local Soviet that the Chechens must be sent back to Siberia or otherwise his Russians would "tear (them) to pieces".

=== Armed Russian mob and the Red Headbands ===
There was evidence of pre-planning in the mob—the Russians of the city (including the communists) pinned red headbands upon their heads so that they would not be taken for Vainakh. The crowd beat to death at least one elderly Chechen from Urus-Martan while the law enforcement officials stood by and watched.

They stormed the government offices, calling for restoration of the Grozny Oblast and the regulation of the Chechens' return from exile.

The mob escalated its actions further and further. A crowd of 500 people attacked the post office, and demanded an audience with the central Soviet government in Moscow. The crowd then went to a long-distance telephone station, but was unable to reach Moscow still. At 23:00 on the 27th, the mob marched on the railway station. Their goal was to spread the word to their "brothers" (i.e. other Russian inogorods and Cossacks) of what they deemed to be the failure of their authorities to put the Chechens and Ingush in their place (though the Russians simply referred to both peoples collectively as "Chechens" or "bandits").

Throughout the whole affair, the non-Russians of the republic did not retaliate and showed large amounts of self-restraint, perhaps hoping against hope that the Russians would be stopped. The authorities only intervened, however, when the Russian/Cossack band began looting government buildings (i.e. the post office, the telephone station and the train station).

The authorities, up until this point, had been largely sympathetic to the goals of the protesters (and many even participated), not in least because they were all ethnic Russians themselves. However, the capture of the train station by the Russians and Cossacks was the last straw. Around the midnight after August 27, they approached the protester-held train station, hoping to reestablish law and order without a fight. However, the Russian mob, already highly excited, began pelting them with stones and various hard objects.

In the end, the protesters left the station and life returned to normal. Although the protest was condemned as "chauvinistic" and "anti-Soviet", none were held accountable for their actions later, and the new regional government afterwards adopted a policy of viewing all Chechen aspirations as Turkish agent work and admiration for the brutal conquerors of Chechnya such as Yermolov.
