= Musa Mahomedov =

North Caucasian-born Ukrainian politician

- Муса Магомедов
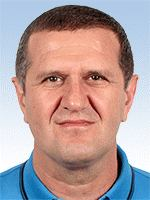
- Official portrait, 2019

People's Deputy of Ukraine
- Incumbent
- Assumed office 29 August 2019
- Preceded by: Yukhym Zvyahilsky
- Constituency: Donetsk Oblast, No. 45

Personal details
- Born: 7 April 1970 (age 56) Irib, Dagestan ASSR, Russian SFSR, Soviet Union (now Dagestan, Russia)
- Party: Independent
- Education: Donetsk Institute of Soviet Trade; International Management Institute; Kharkiv Polytechnic Institute

Musa Serhoievych Mahomedov (Ukrainian: Муса Сергоєвич Магомедов; born 7 April 1970) is an Avar-born Ukrainian entrepreneur and politician currently serving as a People's Deputy of Ukraine from Ukraine's 45th electoral district, including the cities of Avdiivka and Yasynuvata and parts of the city of Donetsk, since 2019. He was previously director of the Avdiivka Coke Plant from 2012 to 2019, managing the plant during the height of the war in Donbas. He is the Chairman of the Subcommittee on Industrial Policy of the Verkhovna Rada Committee on Economic Development.

== Early life and business career ==
Musa Serhoyevych Mahomedov was born on 7 April 1970 in the town of Irib, Dagestan. He graduated from the Donetsk Institute of Soviet Trade (now known as the M. Tugan-Baranovsky Donetsk National University of Economics and Trade), as well as the International Management Institute in Kyiv and the Kharkiv Polytechnic Institute, and began working in production in 2003.

In 2012, Mahomedov became director of the Avdiivka Coke Plant. His tenure was particularly notable for the Battle of Avdiivka during the war in Donbas, after separatists of the Donetsk People's Republic shelled the plant, resulting in a temporary loss of power to the city. Following the battle, he assisted with the reconstruction of Avdiivka, including rebuilding the city's sewage system.

== Political career ==
Mahomedov ran in the 2019 Ukrainian parliamentary election for Ukraine's 45th electoral district, succeeding Yukhym Zvyahilsky, the longest-serving People's Deputy at the time of his retirement. A member of the same Opposition Bloc party that Zvyahilsky had been part of prior to his retirement, Mahomedov won the district with 64.6% of the vote. In second place was pro-Russian Opposition Platform — For Life candidate Anastasiia Petrenko, who garnered 14.56% of the vote.

Among the proposals Mahomedov supported during his candidacy were ending the war in Donbas, restoring the Avdiivka City Court, resolving issues of lighting, gas, and water supply in Donetsk Oblast, and creating additional crossing points on the demarcating line between Ukrainian and separatist forces in the Donbas.

On 4 September 2020, Mahomedov was included in the list of Ukrainian individuals against whom sanctions were imposed by the Russian government.

In February 2021, Mahomedov garnered attention when it was revealed that during a regular meeting of the Verkhovna Rada (Ukraine's parliament), he had been exchanging intimate methods with an individual known as "Oleg Donin." In response to public attention, Mahomedov claimed in a message posted to his Telegram account that it was simply "friendly trolling," and that "Oleg [would] eventually turn out to be Olya."

Mahomedov, along with Oleksiy Honcharenko, introduced a bill to recognise the Chechen Republic of Ichkeria in July 2022. The bill eventually passed in October 2022, leading to Ukrainian recognition of the Chechen Republic of Ichkeria.
