= Irib =

Irib Ириб
- Selo
- Location within Republic of Dagestan Location within Russia
- Coordinates: 42°09′N 46°49′E
- Country: Russia
- Region: Republic of Dagestan
- District: Charodinsky District
- Time zone: UTC+3:00

Irib (Russian: Ириб) is a rural locality (a selo) in Charodinsky District, Republic of Dagestan, Russia. Population: 1,271 (2021 census); 1,099 (2002 census); 718 (1989 Soviet census). There are 8 streets in this selo.

== Geography ==
Selo is located 8 km from Tsurib (the district's administrative centre), 106 km from Makhachkala (capital of Dagestan) and 1,691 km from Moscow. Nukush is the nearest rural locality.
