= Chechen genocide =

Aspect of the Chechen–Russian conflict

- Part of the Chechen–Russian conflict
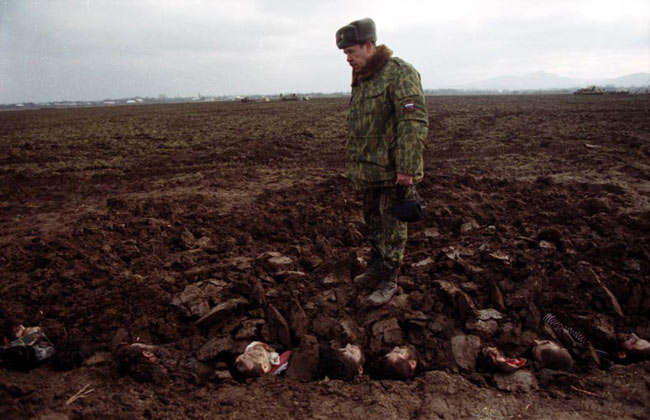
- A Russian soldier stands on an open mass grave of Chechens shortly after the Komsomolskoye massacre, 2000
- Location: North Caucasus
- Date: c. 1785 – 2017
- Target: Chechen people
- Attack type: Genocide, mass murder, ethnic cleansing, deportation, mass rape
- Deaths: 243,000+ (Note: 40,000 (1860); 123,000 including Ingush casualties (1944–1948); 50,000 to 130,000 in the First Chechen War (1994–1996); 30,000 to 80,000 in the Second Chechen War (1999–2009))
- Victims: over 2 million Chechens and others displaced or perished (Note: demographic decline of 1,340,000 between 1847 and 1867 from various causes; 496,000 Chechen and Ingush deported and resettled forcibly 1944-1948; 260,000 Chechens displaced up to 2009)
- Perpetrators: Russian Empire (until 1917); Russian SFSR (until 1922); Soviet Union (until 1991); Russian Federation (1991–2017)
- Motive: Imperialism; Russification; Islamophobia; Chechenophobia; Christianization

The Chechen genocide refers to the mass casualties suffered by the Chechen people since the beginning of the Chechen–Russian conflict in the 19th century. The term has no legal effect, although the European Parliament recognized the 1944 forced deportation of the Chechens, which killed around a third of the total Chechen population, as an act of genocide in 2004. Similarly, in 2022, the Verkhovna Rada of Ukraine condemned the "genocide of the Chechen people" by Russia during the First and the Second Chechen Wars.

== History ==
=== 19th century ===
In 1817, the commander-in-chief of the Russian army in the Caucasus, General Alexey Yermolov, who had a particular dislike for the Chechens, decides to move the Caucasian fortified line, which served as the southern border of the Russian Empire, from the banks of the Terek to the Chechen lands near the Sunzha River. This led to the Caucasian War of 1817–1864.

The occupation of Sunzha was accompanied by a partial expulsion of the Chechens to the mountains ("to live on St. Anthony's food", (Note: The Christian ascetic Anthony of Thebes (III–IV centuries) lived in the desert, eating herbs and roots.) in the words of Yermolov). The latter hoped that, having seized the fields and pastures of the Chechens and created hunger among them, because of the lack of land, they would "begin to exterminate each other" better than him or, in any case, will submit to him.

As Yermolov liked to call himself, the "proconsul of the Caucasus" accused the Chechens of attacking the line. "I'd rather leave the desert steppes from the Terek to Sunzha," he said, "than tolerate robberies in the rear of our fortifications." (Note: Like other European powers, who saw banditry, a chronic tendency to anarchy and rejection of progress and civilization in protests against their rule in Africa and Asia, and explained the expansion of their colonial possessions by the need to protect themselves from "robbers and scum", the Russian Empire did not recognize the fair nature of the highlanders fight and called their resistance and partisan raids "robbery", "predation", "savagery", "highhandedness", and the mountain militias "predatory parties", "bands", "rabble", etc. Meanwhile, raids were often a response to the Cossacks or soldiers driving away cattle from the Chechens and were thus mutual in nature.) In support of his words, in 1819–1820 he conducted punitive expeditions against a number of villages and razed some of them to the ground. Similar operations with the extermination of auls, the taking of hostages as a guarantee of obedience, the destruction of wheats and crops, deforestation, the relocation of residents to the plains under the supervision of the royal forces, the construction of new fortifications on the conquered lands were carried out in subsequent years, throughout the entire Caucasian war.

According to the historian Yevgeny Anisimov, Yermolov is "the founder of the policy of genocide of the Caucasus highlanders" and "the initiator of the creation of 'dead zones' where all life was subjected to complete destruction", including houses, crops, gardens and forests, and the highlanders "were driven higher into the mountains where they, deprived of everything, died of hunger, disease and cold."

Under Yermolov's successors, hostilities continued. For example, in the winter of 1830–1831, General Alexey Velyaminov undertook an expedition to Chechnya with great forces, during which he "suddenly attacked the Chechen auls, putting everything to torch and sword, destroying and stealing cattle, burning stocks of hay and bread, capturing old men and women, chasing away Chechen families in the forests."

In 1832, a nine-thousand-strong Russian detachment destroyed more than 60 rebellious villages in Chechnya within seven weeks. "There is no need to list all the auls […]. Many of the destroyed auls have disappeared forever," writes the tsarist imperial historian Pavel Bobrovsky.

His colleague Alexander Lavrov reports that as the plain was conquered, the recalcitrant population retreated into the depths of the dense mountainous forests, where they built new dwellings: "But soon their turn came. […] Chechens, confident in the inaccessibility of their homes, were taken by surprise. They defended themselves desperately, did not want to concede a single inch of their land and died on the bayonets of our soldiers."

A participant in the Caucasian War, memoirist Vladimir Poltoratsky recalled how in March 1847, Russian soldiers crept up at dawn to the aul where one of the Chechen military commanders was located, and then

they burst into the aul in a terrible wave, shamelessly dousing everything with warm Chechen blood all the way... Two, three, no more rifle shots were heard—it is clear that the Russian bayonet was in use, slaughtering the guilty and the innocent without a miss and mercy. The groans of the dying, taken by surprise, came from all sides tore the soul apart. The slaughter of people of all sexes and ages was carried out on a wide, terrifying scale…

Chechnya finally fell in July 1859. By that time, it had repeatedly become the theater of the devastating expeditions of the imperial troops, so that at times its inhabitants really had to eat grass, as Yermolov once foresaw.

Concurrent with the Circassian genocide, the Chechens were evicted in large numbers, and while many came back, the former Chechen lowlands lacked their historical Chechen populations for a long period until Chechens were settled in the region during the return from their 1944–1957 deportation to Central Asia. The Arshtins, at that time a (debatably) separate people, were completely wiped out as a distinct group: according to official documents, 1,366 Arshtin families disappeared (i.e. either fled or were killed) and only 75 families remained. Additionally, in 1860–1861 the Russian army forced a series of evictions of lands in the central Caucasus, forcing about 10,000 Circassians, 22,000 Chechens and additionally a significant number of Muslim Ossetians out and to Turkey. In addition another 5,000 Chechen families were sent to Turkey in 1865.

=== 20th century ===
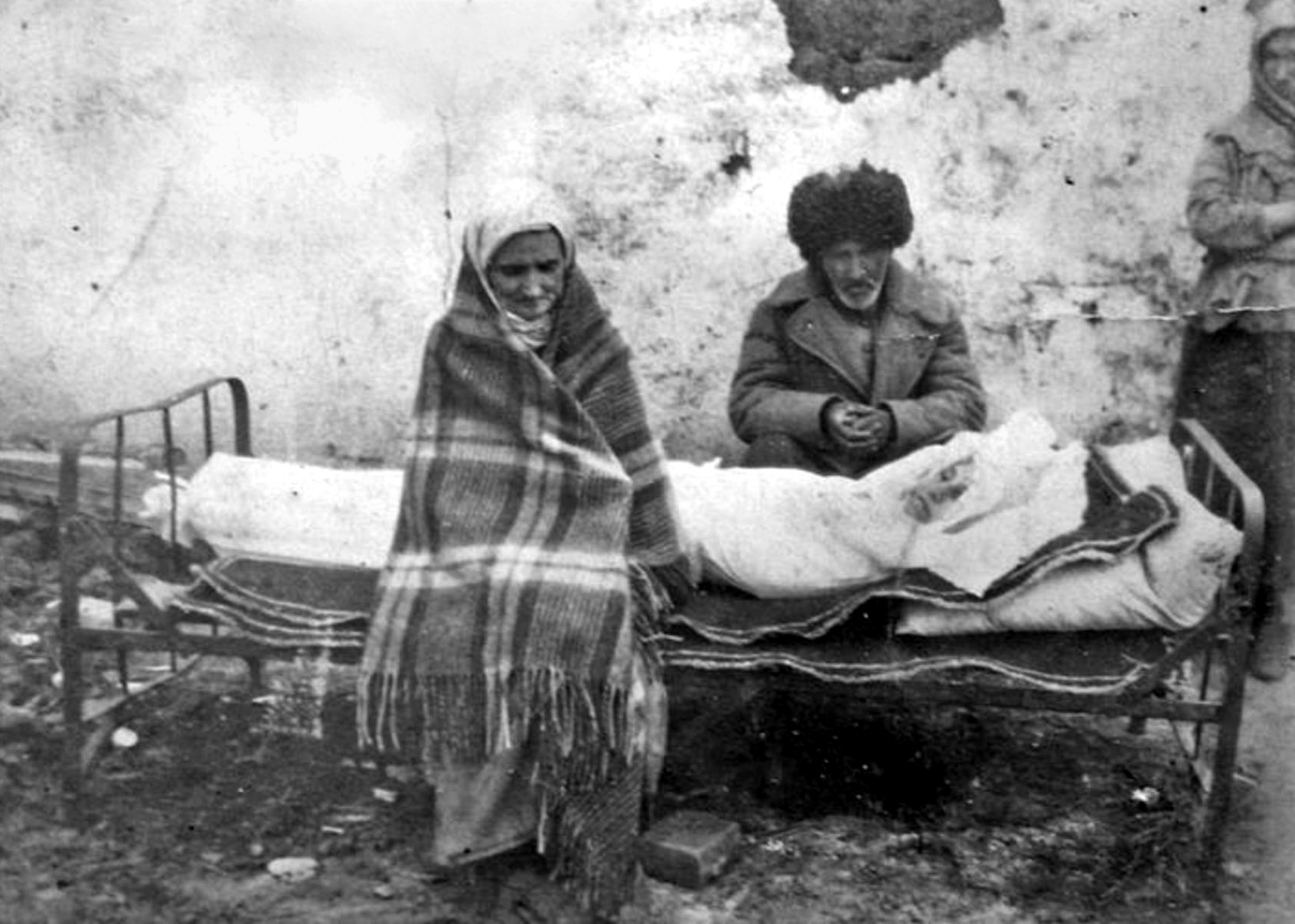
A deported Chechen family in the Kazakh SSR, 1944

On February 23, 1944, Operation Lentil began, the total deportation of Chechens and Ingush to Central Asia, which became the largest and most brutal ethnic deportation in the history of the Soviet Union. The Soviet authorities accused the Chechens and Ingush of betrayal of Motherland in the form of the transfer of many of them to the side of Nazi Germany that attacked the Soviet Union. In reality, there was no mass cooperation with the Germans in Checheno-Ingushetia, since there was "no one to cooperate with": the Nazis were able to briefly seize only the city of Malgobek, at that time inhabited mainly by Russians.

Of the 496,460 (according to other sources, 520,055) Chechens and Ingush deported in 1944, by January 1949 there were 364,220 people registered. At the same time, up to 48% of the Chechen-Ingush special contingent were children under the age 16.

Survivors of the deportation recall being transported in cold and often overcrowded "calf" wagons without toilets. The dead along the way were thrown out or hastily buried in the snow. Upon arrival, the Chechens and Ingush were faced with a lack of basic living conditions. The help officially due to them reached few people and was insufficient. The exiles ate grasses, garbage, eggs and chicks of wild birds and other animals, collected fallen wheat heads and grains, resorted to theft, and begged for alms. Representatives of the authorities, and at first the local population, among whom a rumor was allegedly spread that "cannibals" were being brought to them, were suspicious of the special immigrants. The latter were called "betrayers", "traitors to the homeland", "enemies of the people", "bandits", "beasts".

In the spring of 1944, 46 Chechen families submitted the following appeal to the chairman of the Kirov District Executive Committee of the Frunze Region of the Kyrgyz Soviet Socialist Republic:

From the Chechen people. I ask you not to leave our request, since on February 23, 1944 we were deported here to Kyrgyzstan, our people are dying, to this day more than 30 people are starving, the rest are exhausted, we have from 3 to 5 cows and forty to fifty sheep left in each household, a lot of bread, we took nothing with us. If the state does not provide help, then we are already a lost people. Give us help, or take us back. If you do not help, I ask to shoot us all, together with our families.

On October 10, 1953, the special settler Suleymanov Movla, a native of the village of Shali, living in the city of Kzyl-Orda of the Kazakh Soviet Socialist Republic, filed an application to Moscow, petitioning to remove restrictions from himself and asking to explain to him for what crimes and on the basis of what law he was punished. Without waiting for a reply, on December 10, 1953, Suleymanov re-appealed to the USSR Prosecutor General's Office, which forwarded his complaint to the Grozny Region Prosecutor's Office. As the Deputy Grozny Regional Prosecutor reported in his response dated January 16, 1954, the inspection revealed that Suleymanov, his mother and two sisters "belonged to the Chechen nationality and for this reason were evicted from the territory of the former Checheno-Ingush ASSR." With this in mind, the Deputy Prosecutor added that he considers Suleymanov's complaint "not eligible."

Due to the fact that the only criterion for deportation was the ethnicity of the special settlers, that the mortality among them was very high, and that proper conditions for their transportation, reception and accommodation were not created on the road and in the places of deportation, that the culture and national identity of the deportees were doomed to extinction, that their exile was eternal, the status of special settlers was hereditary, and "unauthorized departure (escape)" from places of "mandatory and permanent settlement" was punishable by up to 20 years of hard labor, some researchers believe that "in fact (or even strictly legally)" Lentil is genocide.

=== Late 20th and early 21st centuries ===
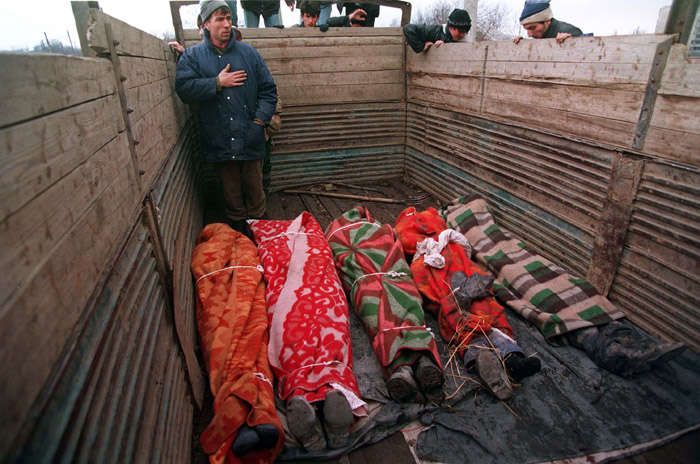
Chechen corpses wrapped in blankets at Grozny, 1995

In the 1990s and 2000s, the territory of Chechnya, which proclaimed itself an independent state in 1991 but did not receive Russian and international recognition, underwent two military campaigns, officially referred to in the Russian Federation as the restoration of constitutional order (1994–1996) and a counter-terrorist operation (1999–2009).

Already the first of these campaigns was described by some commentators as genocide.

In the fall of 1995, human rights activist Igor Kalyapin called the events in Chechnya "one of the most terrible wars of the twentieth century," during which strikes are deliberately and purposefully delivered primarily to civilian objects and crowded places:

Quite a lot has already been said about the so-called filtration points, I will not repeat what is happening there. You won't see this in any movie. […]

I repeat, it is difficult to talk about human rights here, it is necessary to talk about genocide, about military crimes, to demand trial of those who organized this. […]

To summarize, you can take the Universal Declaration of Human Rights, ratified by Russia, read articles, and there will not be a single one that has not been violated.

In the spring of 1996, François Jean, an employee of the international humanitarian organization Doctors Without Borders, regarded the actions of Russian troops as "a total war directed not only against combatants, but against the entire population, whether young, old, men, women or children," a war, "in which neither civilians nor hospitals are considered and in which all international norms and obligations are openly violated with the general indifference" of the world community.

The second campaign in Chechnya, which began in 1999, was even more violent than the previous one. According to human rights activists, Russian troops systematically committed the following crimes in Chechnya: the destruction of cities and villages, not justified by military necessity; shelling and bombardment of unprotected settlements; summary extrajudicial executions and killings of civilians; torture, ill-treatment and infringement of human dignity; serious bodily harm intentionally inflicted on persons not directly participating in hostilities; deliberate strikes against the civilian population, civilian and medical vehicles; illegal detentions of the civilian population; enforced disappearances; looting and destruction of civilian and public property; extortion; taking hostages for ransom; corpse trade. There were also rapes, which, along with women, were also subjected to men. In addition, as in the times of the Caucasian War of the 19th century, there were recorded cases of demonstrative defecation by the Russian military in residential and public premises of Chechens.

The fact that genocide against the Chechen people is being committed in Chechnya has been mentioned in different years by some human rights activists, organizations, journalists, publicists, cultural figures, politicians, residents of Chechnya and others.

== Russian rhetoric ==
Some Russian sources of the 19th century described the Chechens as a violent, treacherous, "miserable" people, whose concepts "do not exceed cattle", having "no morals, nothing to distinguish them from wild beasts", "dirty in soul and body, alien to nobility, unfamiliar with generosity", which differs from all Caucasian ethnic groups "by a special desire for banditry and predation, greed for robbery and murder, deceit, warlike spirit, courage, determination, ferocity, fearlessness and unbridled arrogance", as well as "malice". Yermolov believed that the Chechens "do not even comprehend the most understandable law: the right of the strongest" and that "there are not more vile, or more insidious, or more criminal people in the world." In 1895, the traveler Anna Rossikova wrote that the turbulent history and distinctive features of the Chechens had long since sowed distrust of them by the Russians: "For the majority of Russian people, a Chechen is neither more nor less than a robber, and Chechnya is a den of robber gangs."

According to the historian Dmitri Furman, the Chechens continued to be "unreliable" and "suspicious" people for the Soviet authorities. "It is natural," he believes, "after you have done someone a lot of harm, you can no longer trust him."

The two wars in Chechnya in the late 20th and early 21st centuries were accompanied by anti-Chechen great-power propaganda, as a result of which the Chechens became the most demonized ethnic group in the media and public consciousness of Russia in the 1990–2000s. In 2003, the political scientist Emil Pain, citing Rossikova's 1895 remark quoted above, stated that it "looks like a quote from a contemporary sociological review." A negative or dismissive attitude towards the Chechens was observed both among the philistine environment and among the intelligentsia.

In 2008, non-governmental organizations in Russia announced systematic falsifications in criminal cases initiated against Chechens in 1999–2003. In the 2000s, human rights activist Svetlana Gannushkina and lawyer Murad Musaev complained that "every Chechen is guilty until proven innocent" and that being a Chechen is "almost always an aggravating circumstance" in Russian courts. "For many Chechens, serving a prison sentence in Russia is often tantamount to the death penalty," journalist Emmanuel Grynszpan wrote in a 2019 article published by Amnesty International Switzerland. The total number of Chechens serving sentences in Russian prisons for participating in an armed rebellion of separatists is estimated by human rights activists at 20-25 thousand people. They are said to be the most racially and religiously discriminated against by corrections officers.

According to some reports, ethnic hatred towards the Chechens manifested itself to the greatest extent among the servicemen who participated in the hostilities in the republic, which allegedly partly motivated their unlawful behavior. Military observer Vyacheslav Izmailov claimed that General Vladimir Shamanov "calls Chechens animals, monkeys, gorillas and thus provokes his soldiers against them." According to journalist Vladimir Voronov, Shamanov's entourage liked to repeat: "There is only one way to win: to roll the whole of Chechnya together with the Czechs into asphalt." (Note: The word "Czechs" in Russian military jargon means Chechens.) In March 2000, General Sergei Makarov called the Chechens a "parasite people". The Russian military often said: "A good Chechen is a dead Chechen." Journalist Anna Politkovskaya claimed that when she asked the military about why they killed this or that person, they answered: "Because he is a Chechen." "This is genocide," the journalist concluded.

=== Legal consequences ===
Lentil and other ethnic deportations of the first half of the 20th century were condemned by the Kremlin in the post-Stalin period, but neither in the USSR nor in the Russian Federation was anyone put on trial for their planning and implementation.

Cases of criminal proceedings of the Russian military, who allegedly committed grave crimes against the civilian population of Chechnya in the 1990–2000s, are isolated.

In 2007, journalists Natalya Kozlova and Sergei Ptichkin from the government-run newspaper Rossiyskaya Gazeta, condemning the criminal prosecution of a special forces group of the Main Intelligence Directorate (GRU) accused of killing six peaceful Chechens in January 2002, claimed that "the whole army was then operating in the territory of Chechnya outside the framework of the legal field, something prosecutors prefer not to mention for some reason."

According to some experts, for decades, Russia has been searching for and prosecuting surviving participants in the Chechen side of the conflict accused of murder, terrorism and other especially grave crime—and, according to human rights activists, this is often done legally negligently, with confessions being beaten out under torture,—while the vast majority of representatives of the Russian state, potentially responsible for war crimes in Chechnya, enjoy impunity and in some cases occupy high positions.

On 18 October 2022, Ukraine's parliament condemned the "genocide of the Chechen people" during the First and Second Chechen War.

== See also ==
- History of Chechnya
- Islam in Russia
- Islam in the Soviet Union
- Islamophobia
- Persecution of Muslims
- Racism in Russia
- Racism in the Soviet Union
- Russian war crimes
- Circassian genocide
- Soviet war crimes
