= Chechen–Slav ethnic clashes (1958–1965) =

Chechen-Slav ethnic clashes
- Part of the Chechen–Russian conflict
- Date: 1958 – 1965 (7 years)
- Location: Soviet Union
- Methods: Riots

Casualties
- Deaths: 21+^{[a]}
- Injuries: 166+ injured

The Chechen-Slav ethnic clashes took place from 1958 to 1965 in the North Caucasus (part of the Soviet Union at the time), upon ethnic tensions between Slavic settlers and local Chechens and Ingushs. The violence began in 1958, upon a conflict between a Russian sailor and an Ingush youngster over a girl, in which the Russian was fatally injured. The incident quickly deteriorated into mass ethnic riots in Grozny and surroundings, as Slavic mobs attacked Chechens and Ingushs and looted property throughout the region for 4 days. Ethnic clashes continued through 1960s, and in 1965 some 16 clashes were reported, taking tall of 185 severe injuries, 19 of them fatal. In the late 1960s, the region calmed down and the Chechen-Russian conflict came to its lowest point until the dissolution of the Soviet Union and the eruption of Chechen Wars in the 1990s.

== Background ==
According to Soviet sources, Chechens joined the Wehrmacht upon German invasion of the region in 1941, although this claim is disputed as little evidence exists. By January 1943, the German retreat started, while the Soviet government began discussing the deportation of Chechen and Ingush people far from the North Caucasus. In February 1944, under the direct command of Lavrentiy Beria, almost a half million Chechens and Ingush were removed from their homes and forcibly settled in Central Asia. They were put in forced labor camps in Kazakhstan and Kirgiziya. After Stalin's death in 1953, Nikita Khrushchev came to power and soon denounced his predecessor. In 1957, Chechens were allowed to return to their homes. The Chechen–Ingush Autonomous Soviet Socialist Republic was reestablished.

== Events ==
The violence began in 1958 with the 1958 Grozny riots, starting as a conflict between a Russian sailor and an Ingush youngster over a girl (a fiancé of the Ingush youngster), in which the Russian was fatally injured. The incident quickly deteriorated into mass ethnic riots, as Slavic mobs attacked Chechens and Ingushs and looted property throughout the region for 4 days. Ethnic clashes continued through 1960s, and in 1965 some 16 clashes were reported, causing 185 severe injuries, 19 of them fatal. By late 1960, the region calmed down and the Chechen-Russian conflict came to its lowest point until the dissolution of the Soviet Union and the eruption of Chechen Wars in 1990.

== See also ==
- Ethnic violence

== Notes ==
[a]. At least 20 cumulative deaths occurred during the period of the riots:

- 2 killed - 1 Russian fatally injured in 1958. At least 1 elderly Chechen killed by Slavic mobs.
- 19 killed in 1965 riots.
