= Liman, Astrakhan Oblast =

Urban locality in Astrakhan Oblast, Russia

Coordinates: 45°46′57″N 47°13′29″E

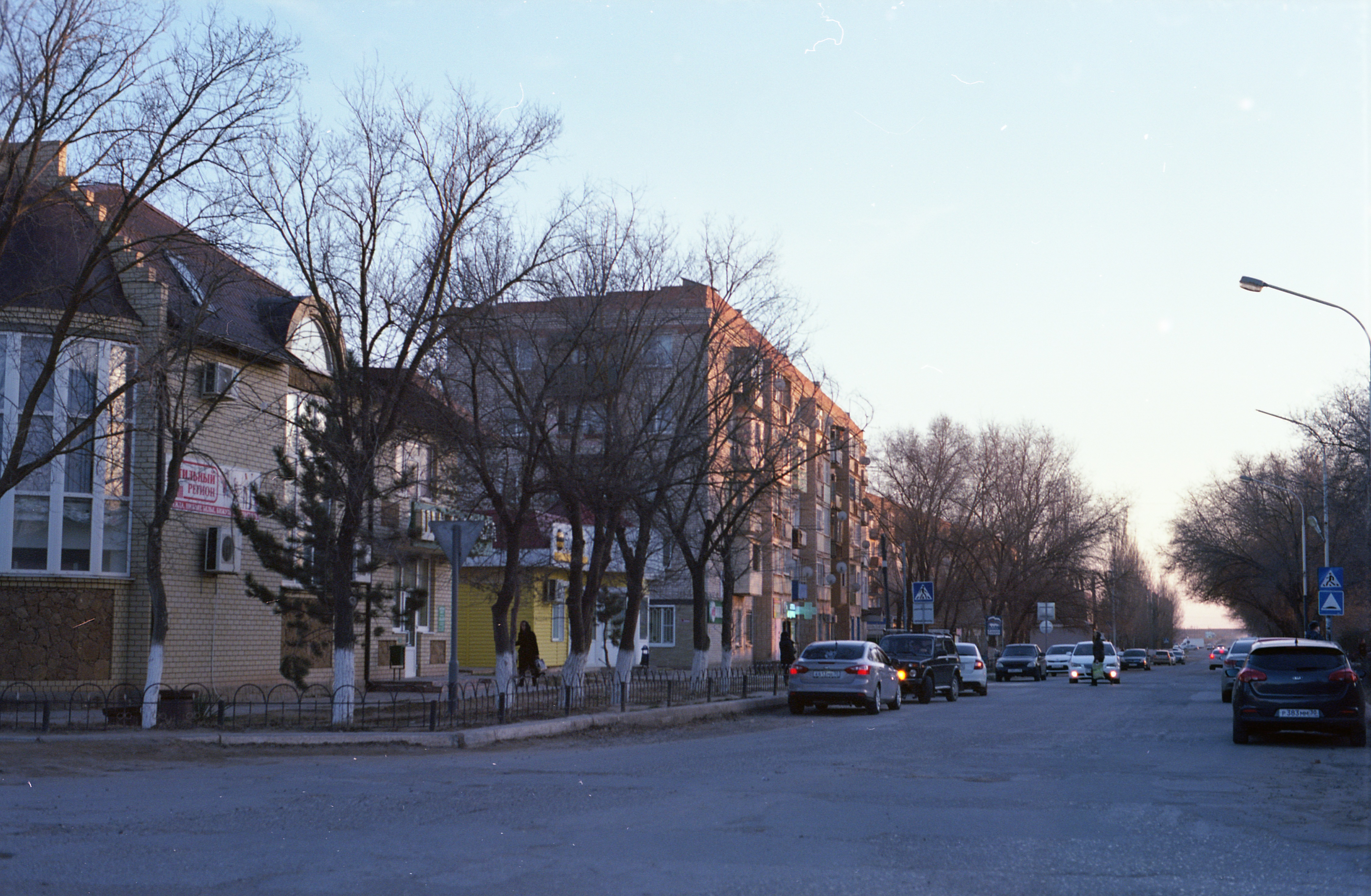

Liman (Russian: Лима́н) is an urban-type settlement and the administrative center of Limansky District of Astrakhan Oblast, Russia. Population: 9,024 (2010 census); 8,899 (2002 census); 9,185 (1989 Soviet census).
