= Limansky District =

Limansky District Лиманский район (Russian)
- District
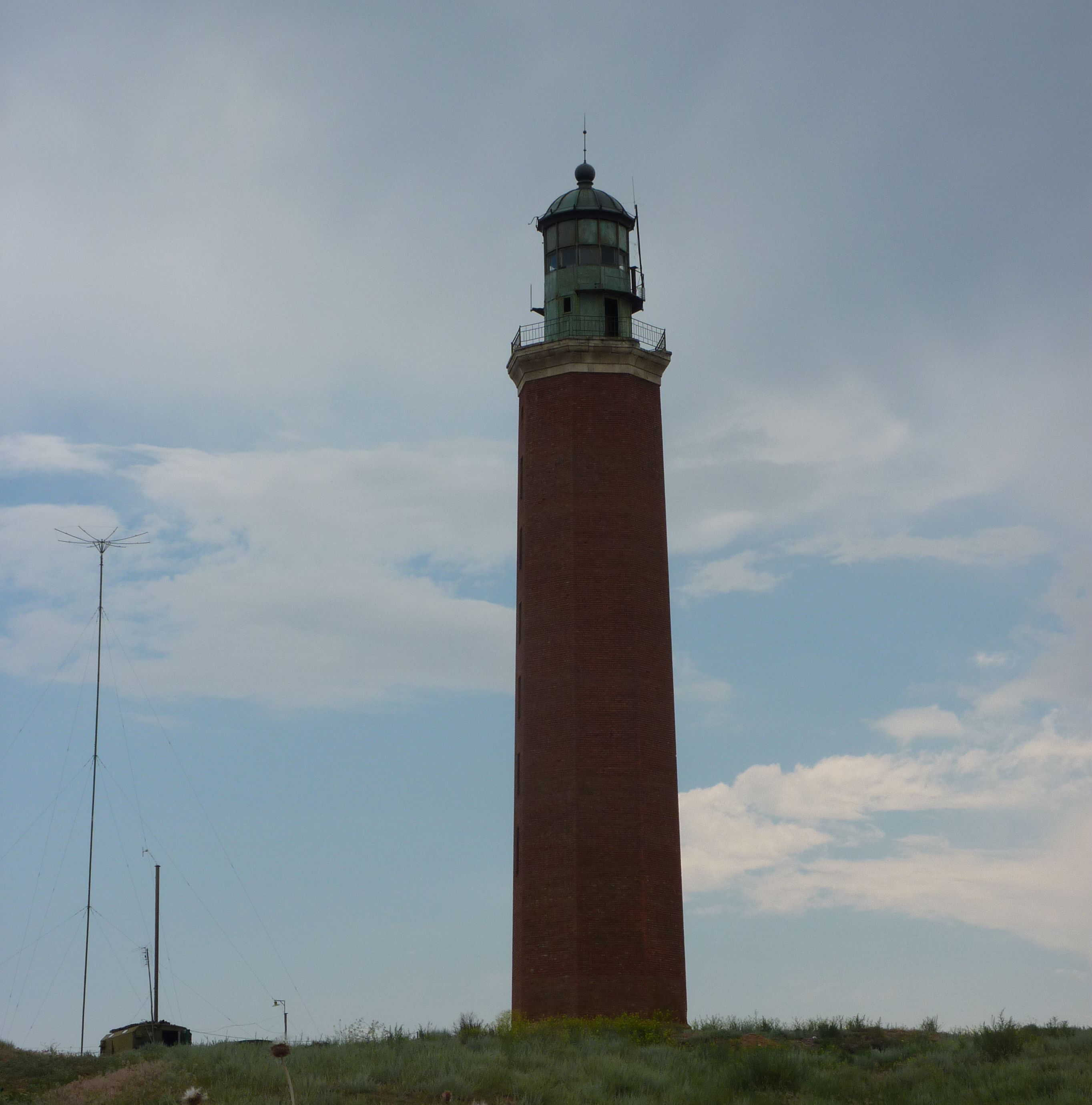
- Peter the Great Lighthouse, a cultural heritage object in the selo of Vyshka in Limansky District

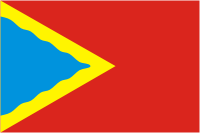
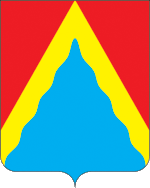
- Flag Coat of arms
- Location of Limansky District in Astrakhan Oblast
- Coordinates: 45°47′N 47°14′E
- Country: Russia
- Federal subject: Astrakhan Oblast
- Established: 1943
- Administrative center: Liman

Area
  - Total: 5,234 km^{2} (2,021 sq mi)

Population (2010 Census)
  - Total: 31,952
  - Density: 6.105/km^{2} (15.81/sq mi)
  - Urban: 28.2%
  - Rural: 71.8%

Administrative structure
  - Administrative divisions: 1 Urban-type settlements, 5 Selsoviets
  - Inhabited localities: 1 urban-type settlements, 29 rural localities

Municipal structure
  - Municipally incorporated as: Limansky Municipal District
  - Municipal divisions: 1 urban settlements, 5 rural settlements
- Time zone: UTC+4 (MSK+1)
- OKTMO ID: 12635000
- Website: http://liman.astrobl.ru

Population of Limansky District
- 2010 Census: 31,952
- 2002 Census: 34,341
- 1989 Census: 35,151
- 1979 Census: 32,496

Limansky District (Russian: Лима́нский райо́н) is an administrative and municipal district (raion), one of the eleven in Astrakhan Oblast, Russia. It is located in the southwest of the oblast. The area of the district is 5,234 square kilometers (2,021 sq mi). Its administrative center is the urban locality (a work settlement) of Liman. As of the 2010 Census, the total population of the district was 31,952, with the population of Liman accounting for 28.2% of that number.

== History ==
In 2005 the Limansky District saw sectarian conflict between the native Kalmyks and Chechen migrant workers over an incident involving a monument on the grave of Kalmyk Eduard Kokmadzhiev. After a Kalmyk was killed during the clashes, the Kalmyks organized a pogrom of the Chechen population with houses being set on fire with support from the local Russian administration.
