= Charodinsky District =

Charodinsky District Чародинский район (Russian)
- District

Other transcription(s)
  - Avar: Чӏарада мухъ
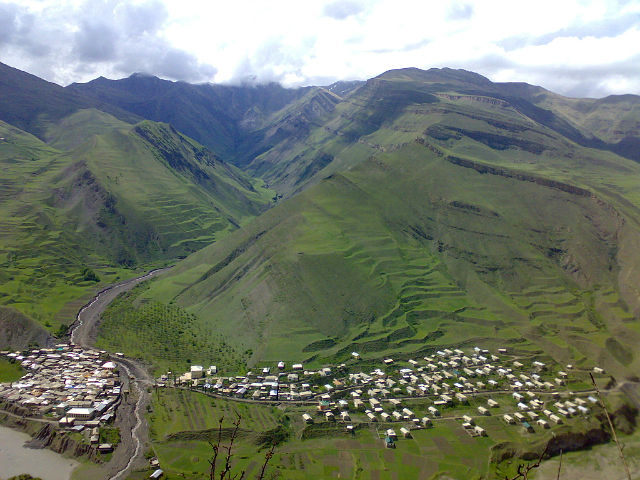
- The selo of Irib in Charodinsky District

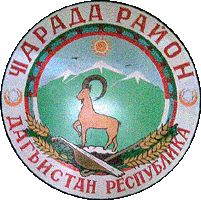
- Coat of arms
- Location of Charodinsky District in the Republic of Dagestan
- Coordinates: 42°14′N 46°50′E
- Country: Russia
- Federal subject: Republic of Dagestan
- Established: 1929
- Administrative center: Tsurib

Area
  - Total: 1,010 km^{2} (390 sq mi)

Population (2010 Census)
  - Total: 11,777
  - Density: 11.7/km^{2} (30.2/sq mi)
  - Urban: 0%
  - Rural: 100%

Administrative structure
  - Administrative divisions: 9 Selsoviets
  - Inhabited localities: 53 rural localities

Municipal structure
  - Municipally incorporated as: Charodinsky Municipal District
  - Municipal divisions: 0 urban settlements, 13 rural settlements
- Time zone: UTC+3 (MSK)
- OKTMO ID: 82659000
- Website: http://чарода.рф

Population of Charodinsky District
- 2010 Census: 11,777
- 2002 Census: 11,792
- 1989 Census: 10,315
- 1979 Census: 12,614

Charodinsky District (Russian: Чародинский райо́н; Avar: Чӏарада мухъ) is an administrative and municipal district (raion), one of the forty-one in the Republic of Dagestan, Russia. It is located in the south of the republic. The area of the district is 1,010 square kilometers (390 sq mi). Its administrative center is the rural locality (a selo) of Tsurib. As of the 2010 Census, the total population of the district was 11,777, with the population of Tsurib accounting for 19.0% of that number.

== Administrative and municipal status ==
Within the framework of administrative divisions, Charodinsky District is one of the forty-one in the Republic of Dagestan. The district is divided into nine selsoviets which comprise fifty-three rural localities. As a municipal division, the district is incorporated as Charodinsky Municipal District. Its nine selsoviets are incorporated as thirteen rural settlements within the municipal district. The selo of Tsurib serves as the administrative center of both the administrative and municipal district.

== Notable people ==
Freestyle Wrestling World and Olympic Champion Abdulrashid Sadulaev is from Tsurib, Charodinsky District.
