= Tsurib =

Rural locality in Dagestan, Russia

Coordinates: 42°14′13″N 46°50′03″E

Tsurib (Russian: Цуриб, Avar: ЦIуриб) is a rural locality (a selo) and the administrative center of Charodinsky District of the Republic of Dagestan, Russia. Population: 2,234 (2010 census); 1,789 (2002 census); 1,911 (1989 Soviet census).
