= Lapas, Astrakhan Oblast =

Lapas Лапас
- Selo
- Interactive map of Lapas
- Location within Astrakhan Oblast Location within Russia
- Coordinates: 46°57′06″N 47°49′48″E
- Country: Russia
- Region: Astrakhan Oblast
- District: Kharabalinsky District
- Time zone: UTC+4:00
- Postal code: 416024

Lapas (Russian: Лапас) is a rural locality (a selo) in Khosheutovsky Selsoviet, Kharabalinsky District, Astrakhan Oblast, Russia. The population was 688 as of 2010. There is school, first established in 1926.

== History ==
According to questionnaires of 1905, it was founded around 1850 by the Karagash Nogais, resettled from the village of Seitovka, Krasnoyarsky District, Astrakhan Oblast. In 1938, residents from several other villages were relocated to the village. Nogais, Kazakhs, Russians and several families of Chechens live there. The settlement is located on the territory of the Ukrainian ethnic and cultural region Yellow Ukraine. Since 1925, it belongs to Kharabalinsky district. According to the law dated August 6, 2004, the local self-government body is the Khosheutovo Village Council.

== Geography ==
Lapas is located on the Akhtuba River, 67 km southeast of Kharabali (the district's administrative centre) by road. Khosheutovo is the nearest rural locality.

== Archeological site Lapas ==
The settlement of Lapas is the generally accepted name among researchers for the settlement of Ak-Saray, north of the village of Lapas, on the left bank of the Bolshoi Ashuluk channel of the Akhtuba River. The official name is “The ancient settlement of Ak-Saray and the ruins of the feudal castle of Davlet Khan.” A complex of ruins of mausoleums, presumably of the khans of the Golden Horde Berke, Özbeg Khan, Jani Beg and Berdi Beg. The existence of the burial place of Batu Khan himself and other khans of pre-Islamic times cannot be ruled out. The question of who owns the eight smaller mausoleums and how they date remains open. On the map of the Pizzigani brothers ( 1367 ) there is a symbol in the form of a Muslim mausoleum. Explanatory inscription: “Tombs of emperors who died in the Sarayskaya River area.” Fra Mauro’s map ( 1459 ) also shows a place called "Sepultura imperial" ("Imperial burial grounds"). This place was guarded by guards who did not let anyone through under pain of punishment or death. In the 1930s, the ruins of the mausoleum walls were dismantled by residents of the village of Khosheutovo for household needs. In the 1960s, it was placed under state protection by the director of the Astrakhan State Museum of Local Lore, V. A. Filipchenko . In the 1990s, systematic reconnaissance work was carried out by a detachment of the Volga Archaeological Expedition of the Institute of Archeology of the Russian Academy of Sciences under the leadership of V.V. Dvornichenko. In particular, about 100 coins were found, mostly from the period from 1312 to 1342 (during the reign of Özbeg Khan). These studies were interrupted, and relations with the regional authorities did not work out. In 2000, in connection with the laying of a gas pipeline, archaeological and ethnographic research was carried out at the site under the leadership of D.V. Vasiliev (complex expedition of the Astrakhan Pedagogical University “Heritage”). The security zone of the settlement begins directly from the northern outskirts of the village of Lapas and stretches along the coast to the north for a distance of about 1.5 km and 2.25 km to the east, intersected by the Volgograd-Astrakhan highway. Around 2000, two high-pressure gas and oil pipelines were laid across the territory of the settlement in the central part of the security zone, the technical services of which are also located on the territory of the settlement.
