= Sarai (city) =

Two successive capitals of the Golden Horde

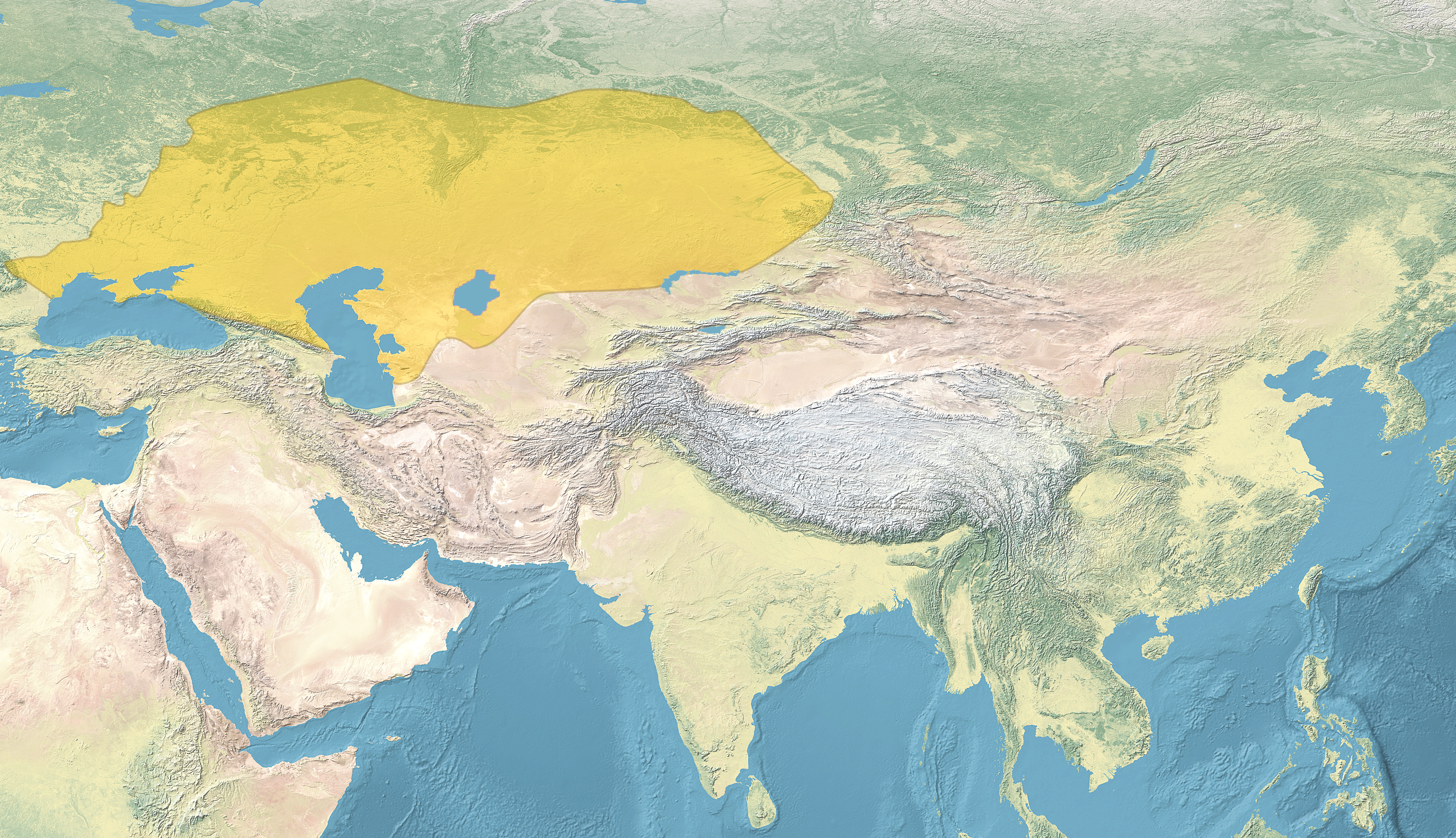
Sarai, near the Caspian Sea, was the capital of the Golden Horde.

Sarai (Turki/Kypchak and Persian: سرای; also transcribed as Saraj or Saray; "mansion" or "court") was the name of possibly two cities near the lower Volga, that served successively as the effective capitals of the Cuman–Kipchak Confederation and later the Golden Horde, a Turco-Mongol khanate. There is considerable disagreement among scholars about the correspondence between specific archaeological sites.

== Old Sarai ==
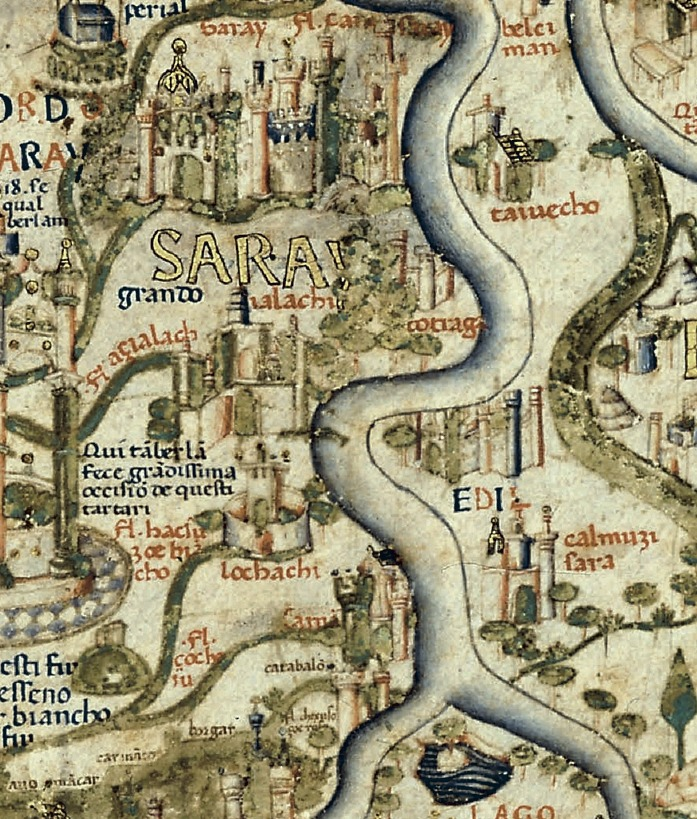
Sarai in the Fra Mauro map.

"Old Sarai" (سرای باتو, Sarāy-i Bātū; or سرای برکه, Sarāy-i Barka) was established by the Mongol ruler Batu Khan (r. 1227–1255), as indicated both by occasional references to the "Sarai of Batu" ("Sarai Batu", Sarāy-i Bātū), and by an explicit statement of William of Rubruck, a Franciscan friar who visited Batu in 1253 or 1254, on his way to the court of the Great Khan Möngke at Qaraqorum. William's statement, "Sarai, the new town that Baatu is making on the Etilia," is considered the first historical reference to the city; a few passages later he refers to the same settlement as "Sarai and the palace of Baatu". The slightly later Persian historian ʿAṭā Malik Juwaynī describes this settlement as both "camp" (muḫayyam) and "city" (šahr), reflecting its dual function, gradual development, and perhaps the lifestyle preferences of its various inhabitants.

As the principal seat of Batu, Berke, and their successors, Sarai was effectively the capital of a great empire, although the khan and his court occasionally resided at other sites as well. The Mongols did not replace the ruling Russian elite and so the Russian princes were required to visit Sarai to pledge allegiance to the khan and receive the khan's patent of approval (yarlyk) as a condition of keeping their thrones. Even the senior Russian prince, the grand prince of Vladimir, was required to be confirmed in Sarai, and he is first mentioned as making the journey there in 1243, when Batu is reported to have said to Yaroslav Vsevolodovich: "O Yaroslav, may you be the senior of the princes in the Russian land". The death of a great khan sometimes necessitated a visit by the grand prince to Qaraqorum, although many, if not all, local princes, were confirmed in Sarai.

In 1261, the city became a seat of the Saray diocese of the Russian Church (Krutitsy), presiding over a Russian community that lived there. It was considered advantageous for leading Russian princes to have a high-ranking Greek or Russian bishop be present at the khan's court. The bishop of Sarai was also likely responsible for overseeing Russians and Greeks residing and trading at the court of the khan. The bishop at times was also sent to negotiate with the Byzantines in Constantinople. The friars established themselves in Sarai in 1280.

It also served, at least occasionally, as the burial site of khans: when he died in 1266, Berke was buried at the "Sarai of Batu", according to the Ilkhanid vizier Rashīd ad-Dīn Faḍlullāh. Berke had presumably continued the development of the city, promoting the settlement of Muslims and attracting Muslim literati, leading later Muslim accounts to credit him with the foundation of the city; this probably led to references to the "Sarai of Berke", although it is doubtful that there was ever an entirely separate city called "Sarai of Berke" (two cities, Sarāy-i Bātū and Sarāy-i Barka, are only mentioned by the 15th-century Persian author Muʿīn-ad-Dīn Naṭanzī, who is often confused about the history of the Golden Horde); it certainly cannot be identified with "New Sarai", which was founded more than six decades after Berke's death. The earliest coins struck at Sarai have been identified with issues of Berke from 1264/1265. During the reign of Mengu-Timur Khan silver coins (dirhams) were again struck with the label "Sarai" in 1272/1273; coins of more consistent standard and issue followed under Toqta Khan, especially after 1310.

== New Sarai ==
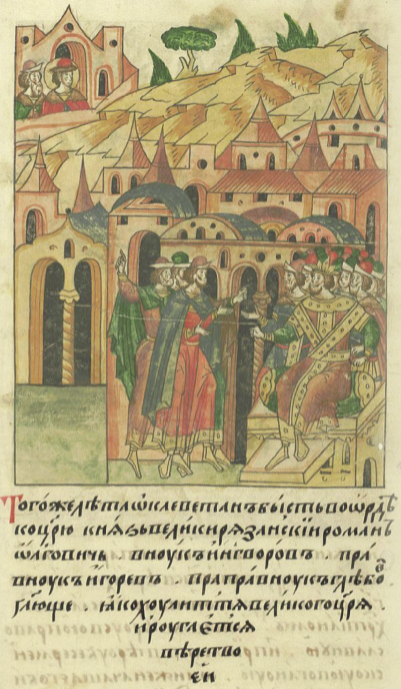
Prince Roman Olgovich of Ryazan comes to Khan Mengu-Timur at Sarai in 1270; Russian chronicle illustration from 1568.

The domains of the Golden Horde in 1389. The gold star shows the location of the Tsarev site traditionally identified as New Sarai.

"New Sarai" (سرای الجدید, Sarāy al-Jadīd) is said to have been founded or formally inaugurated by Öz Beg Khan in the first half of the 14th century after he built a palace on the Volga about 78 miles (126 km) north of Old Sarai. The earliest explicit reference to a city bearing this name is the notice of the death of Öz Beg in "New Sarai" in March–April 1341 by a nearly contemporary Mamluk author. A statement of the Timurid historian Ibn ʿArabshāh that "between the building of Sarāy and its devastation there passed sixty-three years" would place the formal founding of "New Saray" 63 lunar years before its sack by Timur in the winter of 1395–1396, and so in 1334–1335. The reasons for the relocation of the capital are unclear, as is how substantial such a relocation actually was (since identifications of sites of "Old Sarai" and "New Sarai" are debated), although it is sometimes assumed that the rationale was a change in the level of the Caspian Sea and the extent of the waterways in the Volga Delta.

Sarai and the other major centers of the Golden Horde (like Gülistan, preferred by Jani Beg) along the lower Volga benefited from trade and exhibited a significant degree of cultural prosperity. While the origin of coins simply labeled "Sarai" remains uncertain, coins labeled "New Sarai" started to be minted from 1342. An astrolabe was discovered during excavations at the site, and the city was home to many poets, most of whom are known only by name. These included Hisām Kātib (c. 1375) and Sayf-i Sarāy, who died in 1396.

This prosperity was rapidly threatened by the onset of chronic political and military instability alongside competition for the throne of the Golden Horde after 1361. As the traditional capital and a rich and prestigious prize, Sarai became the target of most claimants to the throne. The beglerbeg (commander) Mamai, for example, took Sarai on behalf of his own puppet khans on four or five occasions between 1362 and 1375/1376, losing it to rivals each time. Intervening in the internal conflicts within the Golden Horde, the Central Asian conqueror Timur sacked, leveled, and set on fire Sarai in the winter of 1395–1396. The city had partially recovered by 1402, and by the 1420s minted coins again, although the Golden Horde did not completely stabilize. Shortly after the Russian traveler Afanasy Nikitin passed through in 1469, Sarai was plundered by the ushkuyniki, riverine pirates from Vyatka, in 1471. The Muscovite commander Vasily Ivanovich Nozdrovaty Zvenigorodsky and the Crimean prince in Muscovite exile Nur Devlet plundered the "Yurt of Batu" in 1480, in a counterattack ordered by Ivan III of Russia in retaliation for the advance of Khan Aḥmad against Moscow. The decisive blow seems to have been the sacking and burning of Sarai by Khan Meñli I Giray of the Crimea in June 1502. The forces of Ivan IV of Russia passed through and destroyed what was left of Sarai while conquering the Astrakhan Khanate in 1556. After it expanded its control over the lower Volga region, Russia established the new fortress cities of Astrakhan in 1558, and Tsaritsyn (now Volgograd) in 1589.

== Descriptions of Sarai ==
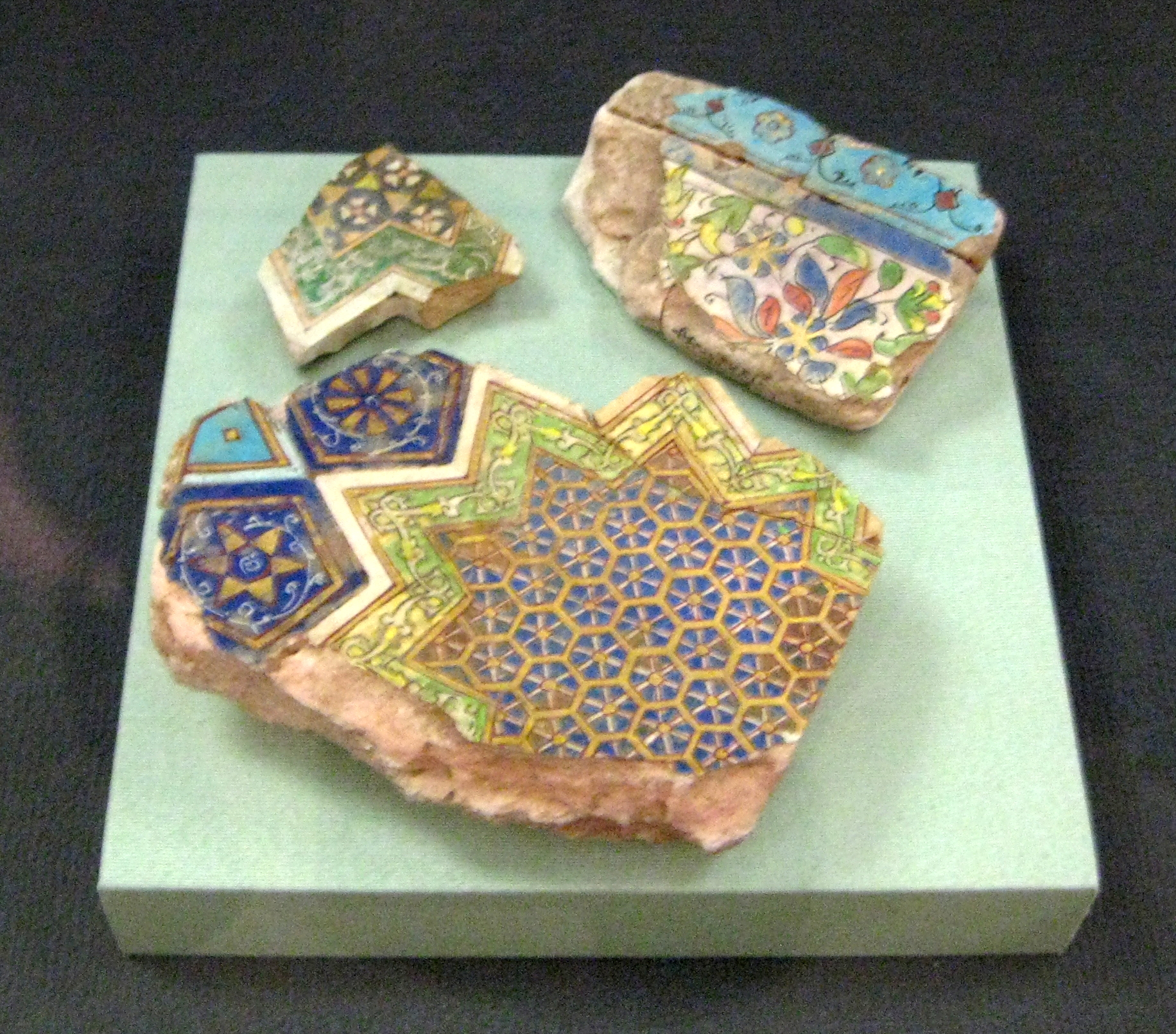
Tilework fragments of a palace in Sarai.

The traveler Ibn Baṭṭūṭa, who visited in about 1332, has left a description of Sarai (or, as he called it, "the city of al-Sarā, known also as al-Sarā Baraka, which is the capital of the sultan Ūzbak"). Since the foundation of "New Saray" is estimated to have taken place about this time, it is not entirely clear which Sarai was described by Ibn Baṭṭūṭa; the stated distance of 3 days upstream from Astrakhan (al-Ḥājj Tarkhān) is possibly consistent with the site at Selitrennoe Gorodišče, traditionally identified as "Old Sarai", but the archaeological excavations of that site might not support this identification.

The city of al-Sarā is one of the finest of cities, of boundless size, situated in a plain, choked with the throng of its inhabitants, and possessing good bazaars and broad streets. We rode out one day with one of its principal men, intending to make a circuit of the city and find out its extent. Our lodging place was at one end of it and we set out from it in the early morning, and it was after midday when we reached the other end. We then prayed the noon prayer and ate some food, and we did not get back to our lodging until the hour of the sunset prayer. One day we went on foot across the breadth of the town, going and returning, in half a day, this too through a continuous line of houses, among which there were no ruins and no gardens. The city has thirteen mosques for the holding of Friday prayers, one of them being for the Shāfiʿites; as for the other mosques, they are exceedingly numerous. There are various groups of people among its inhabitants; these include the Mughals, who are the dwellers in this country and its sultans, and some of whom are Muslims, then the Āṣ (Alans), who are Muslims, the Qifjaq (Cumans), the Jarkas (Circassians), the Rūs (Rus'), and the Rūm (Romans) – [all of] these are Christians. Each group lives in a separate quarter with its own bazaars. Merchants and strangers from the two ʿIrāqs, Egypt, Syria and elsewhere, live in a quarter which is surrounded by a wall for the protection of the properties of the merchants. The sultan's palace in it is called Alṭūn Tāsh, alṭūn meaning 'gold', and tāsh, 'head'.

The Damascene historian Aḥmad ibn Faḍlallāh al-ʿUmarī, who died in 1349, has also left a description of Sarai, based on the account of a traveler; once again, it is not entirely clear whether the information refers to Old Sarai or New Sarai, given its date, and references to both Berke and Öz Beg:

The city of Sarai was built by Berke Khan on the banks of the Turanian river (Volga). It is on salty soil, without any walls. The place of residence of the king is a large palace, atop which a golden crescent ... The palace is surrounded by walls, towers and houses, in which live his emirs. In this palace are their winter lodgings ... Sarai is a grand city accommodating markets, baths and religious institutions, and storages for many goods and commodities ... In the middle of it, there is a pond, the water for which comes from this river ... Uzbek Khan has built here a madrassah for religious studies, as he is very devoted to knowledge and scholars.

In 1623–1624, a Russian merchant, Fedot Kotov, traveled to Persia via the lower Volga. He described the site of Sarai:

Here by the river Akhtuba stands the Golden Horde. The khan's court, palaces, and courts, and mosques are all made of stone. But now all these buildings are being dismantled and the stone is being taken to Astrakhan.

As so often the case, it is difficult to decide to which Sarai (or other center) this description applies.

== Location of Old Sarai and New Sarai ==
The location and identity of the settlement or settlements called Sarai (which means, after all, simply "palace" and moreover seems to function as a synonym of "horde") have been subject to scholarly disagreement. Arguments have centered on whether or not there were two (or more) capital cities named Sarai and what their respective locations were. One of the influential views that emerged was that "New Sarai" was an enhancement or expansion of "Old Sarai", rather than a separate settlement. The other view was that "Old Sarai" and "New Sarai" were two separate settlements after all, separated by some distance, with "New Sarai" possibly associated with a satellite settlement called Gülistan. Already in the second half of the 18th and first quarter of the 19th century, Sarai was being sought variously at the large ruin fields of Tsarevskoye gorodishche and Selitrennoye gorodishche, both located (some 250 km apart) on the left bank of the Akhtuba, a left distributary of the Volga, which remain the most impressive archaeological sites in the area.

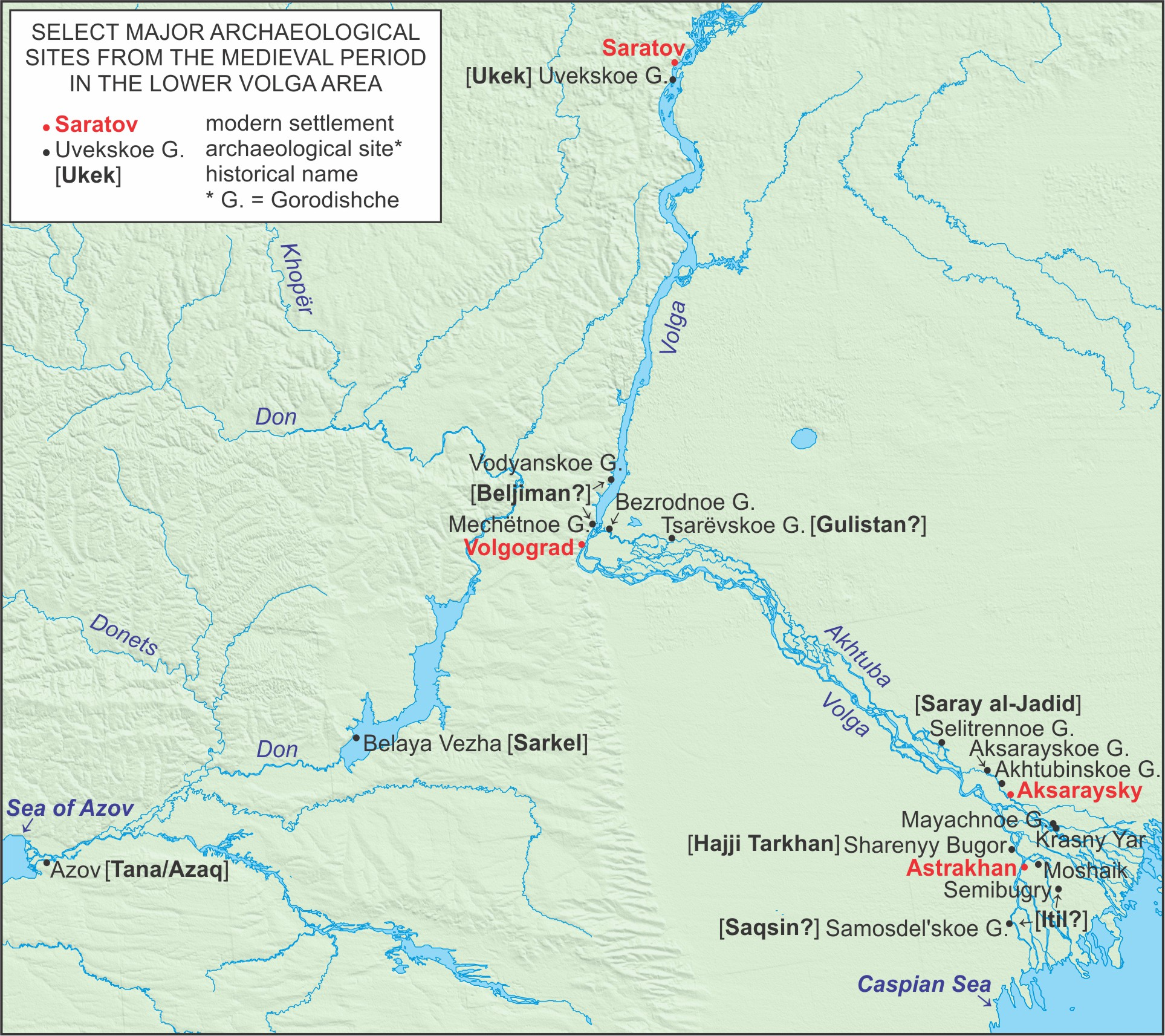
Map of the Medieval archaeological sites on the Lower Volga, including the proposed locations for Sarai. The map reflects the current repudiation of the identification of Old Sarai with Selitrennoye gorodishche (which is New Sarai) and of New Sarai with Tsarevskoye gorodishche (which is probably Gulistan).

During the late 19th-late 20th century, the dominant view that resulted from earlier studies, was that "Old Sarai" was founded in the 13th century by Batu and located at Selitrennoye gorodishche (previously also called Dzhigit Hadzhi, 47.1814°N 47.4345446°E just northwest of modern Selitrennoye, about 30 km southeast of Kharabali and about 120 km north from Astrakhan), while "New Sarai" was founded later in the 13th century by Berke and made capital in the early 14th century by Öz Beg, and was located at Tsarevskoye gorodishche (previously also called Tsarevy Pady, 48.6827442°N 45.3434944°E, just northwest of modern Tsarev and farther west of Kolobovka, about 55 km east-southeast of Volzhsky). The Selitrennoye gorodishche archaeological site was described as "Gorodishche Selitrennoye ... remains of the Golden Horde capital Sarai-Batu" on the official sign in at the site, while the corresponding sign at the Tsarevskoye gorodishche archaeological site read "Ruins of Sarai-Berke (New Sarai)".

This apparent certainty was eventually eroded by subsequent scholarship. First, it was noted that "New Sarai" could not be associated with Berke on historical, archaeological, and numismatic grounds, leading to a modification of the reconstruction: "New Sarai" was built by Öz Beg, and both "Sarai Batu" and "Sarai Berke" referred to "Old Sarai". Second, the analysis of the archaeological remains and distribution of found coins led to the realization that, while Selitrennoye gorodishche matched Sarai (or more specifically "New Sarai"), Tsarevskoye gorodishche did not, and was likely to represent the hitherto unlocated city of Gülistan, which was developed by Jani Beg and rivaled Sarai as a khan's residence and mint in the 1350s and 1360s but then declined. This conclusion quickly gained support among the experts, and the present general consensus is that Selitrennoye gorodishche (47.1814°N 47.4345446°E) is "New Sarai", while Tsarevskoye gorodishche (48.6827442°N 45.3434944°E) is Gülistan.

There is currently no consensus on the location and identification of "Old Sarai". Some scholars suppose that it was a less impressive settlement whose ruins are yet unnoticed or obscured under those of "New Sarai" at Selitrennoye gorodishche, or were destroyed by changing water courses and levels. Others have sought a suitable archaeological site downstream of Selitrennoye gorodishche to identify with "Old Sarai". Here there are extensive remains of Golden Horde settlements, especially at Aksarayskoe gorodishche (at modern Lapas, medieval Dawlat-Khan), and at Akhtubinskoe gorodishche (at modern Komsomol'skiy, medieval Ak-Saray). Apart from a tentative suggestion for Volnoye 15 km downstream from Selitrennoye, Akhtubinskoe gorodishche at Komsomol'skiy has also been suggested, and a case has been made for Krasnoyarskoe gorodishche in Krasny Yar, where the necropolis on the neighboring Mayachny hill has yielded some coins from the 13th century.

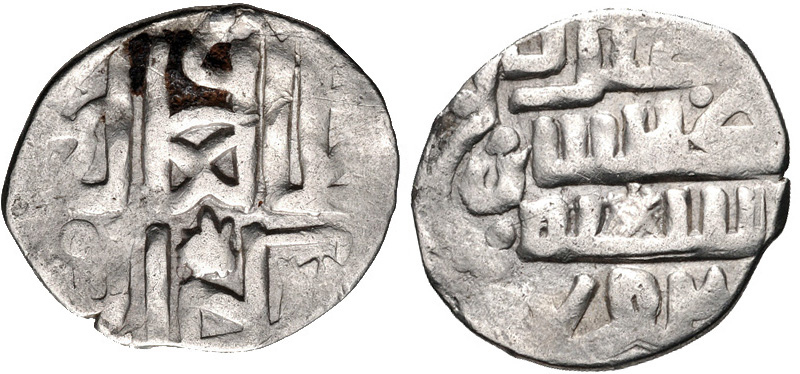
A coin of Golden Horde ruler Jani Beg, from his New Serai mint. Dated AH 748 (1347-8 CE)

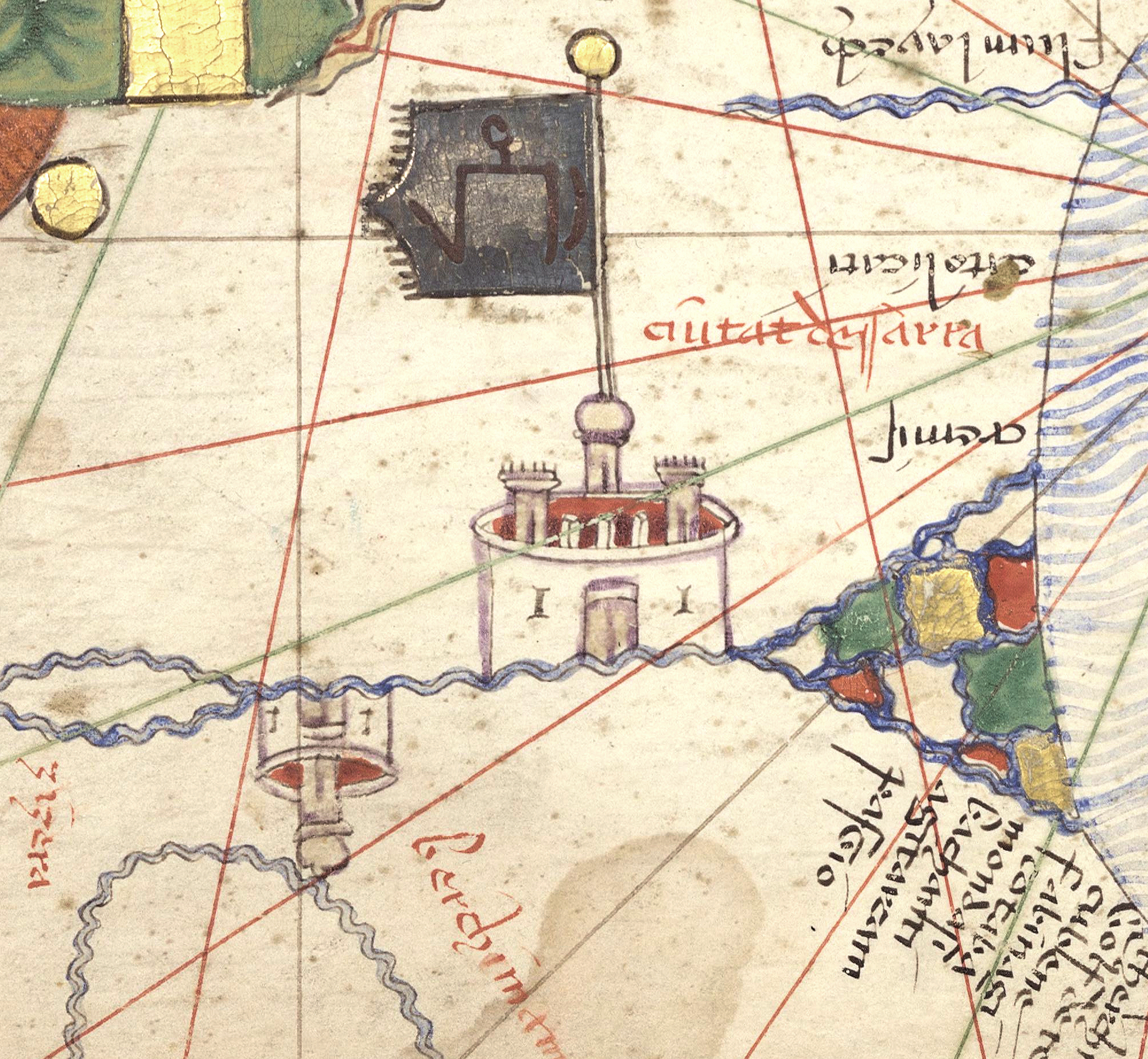
Ciutat de Sarra with the Golden Horde banner in the Catalan Atlas (1375).

The question remains open. The account of William of Rubruck (1254) ensures a location for the Sarai of Batu at or slightly above the apex of the Volga Delta, on the left edge of the Volga-Akhtuba river sistem. This is something possibly compatible with Selitrennoye gorodishche, or perhaps rather with a site farther downstream, between it and the apex of the Delta. This is also consistent with the account of Abū al-Fidāʾ (1321), which places Sarai on the Volga only 2 days above the Caspian coast, and with that of Ibn Baṭṭūṭa, who reached Sarai 3 days after (Old) Astrakhan. Pegolotti (writing in 1335–1343) gives a single day's journey between Sarai and Astrakhan, while the Nikon Chronicle cites 2 days for the same journey. Only the account of William of Rubruck refers without any doubt to "Old Sarai", since it dates to the reign of Batu. If "Old Sarai" and "New Sarai" coexisted for some time at some distance from each other, "Old Sarai" ought to be sought downstream of "New Sarai". This might be confirmed by a 15th-century map from the Franciscan monastery of Lesina (Hvar), which places Saray (apparently "New Sarai" at Selitrennoye gorodishche) on the Volga, above Dolatcana (Dawlat-Khan, at Aksarayskoe gorodishche/Lapas), above Eschisari (Eski Saray, i.e., "Old Sarai"). One interpretation of the evidence would place Batu's original camp on the Akhtuba across from modern Seitovka (and just south from modern Aksaraysky), "Old Sarai" a little upstream at medieval Ak-Saray (Akhtubinskoe gorodishche, Komsomol'skiy), the major royal necropolis a little upstream at medieval Dawlat-Khan (Aksarayskoe gorodishche, Lapas), and "New Sarai" a little upstream at Selitrennoye gorodishche.

== Little Sarai ==
Sarai Juk (Sarāyjūq or Sarāyčūq in Perso-Arabic texts, Sarayçık in Turkic ones, "Little Sarai") was a city on the lower Ural River. It is sometimes conflated with the other Sarais in historical and modern accounts, and was once considered a possible location for the capital of the Golden Horde. This town did serve as the main city of the Nogai Horde, one of the successors of the Golden Horde. Although sacked by the Ural Cossacks in 1580, it was later used as the headquarters by some Kazakh khans.

== Sarai-Batu Museum and Tourist Center ==
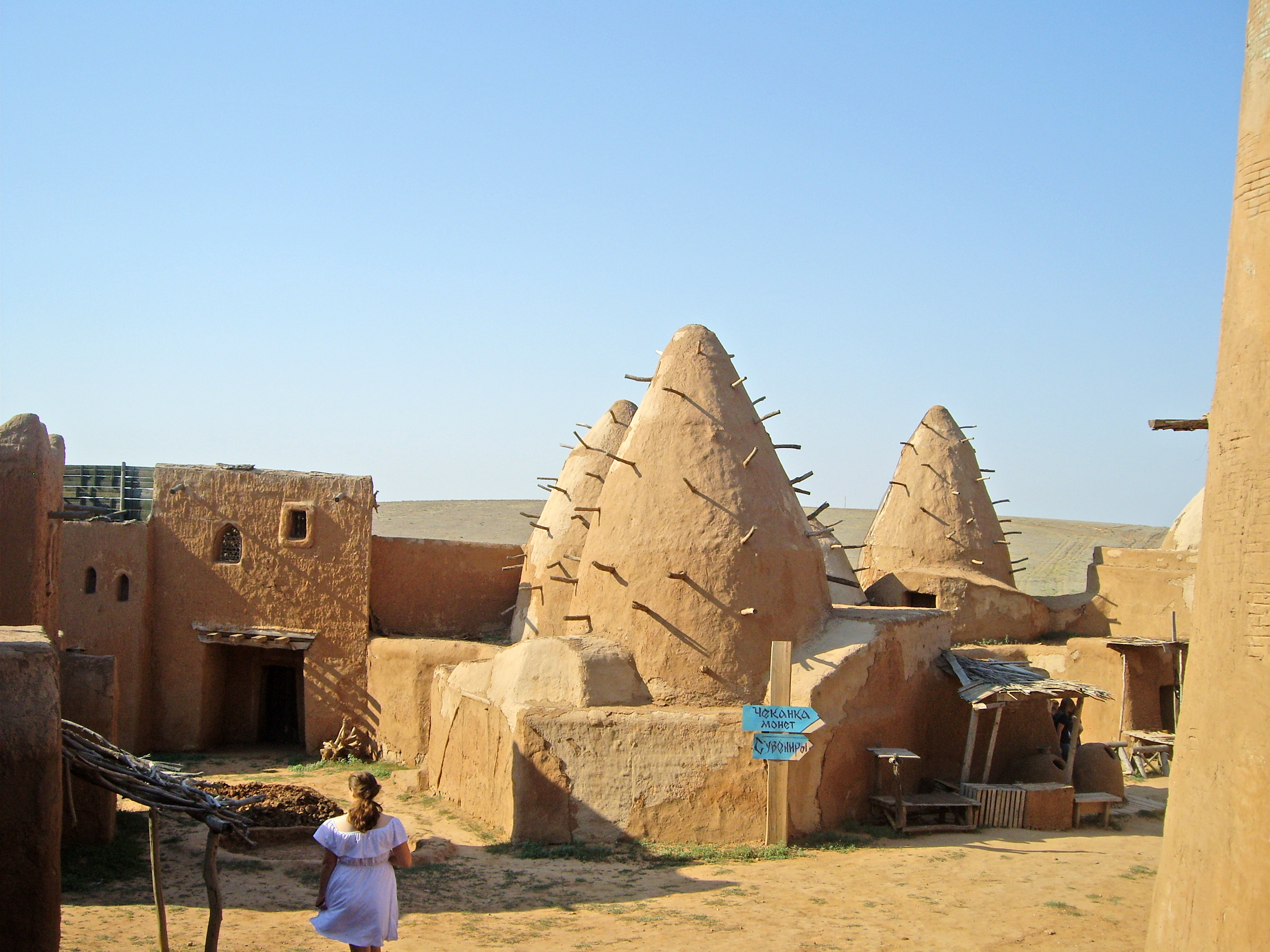
Inside the "Sarai-Batu" museum and tourist center, originally the set built for The Horde.

Located just under 5 km northwest of the border of the archaeological site of Selitrennoe gorodishche (the medieval "New Sarai") is the "Sarai-Batu" open air museum and tourist center. This was originally built in 2011 as a set for the filming of the 2012 film The Horde, and it was also used as the setting for a few scenes in the 2016 series Sophia. The sets, built of wood covered with cement and then clay, were recovered with clay again in 2013 in preparation for the continued use of the structures. The sets represent several spaces within the Golden Horde city, combining both attention to reproducing genuine details uncovered by archaeologists and an element of fantasy inspired by medieval and pre-modern settlements in the Eurasian Steppes. They were converted into an open air museum and tourist center at the initiative of the governor of Astrakhan Oblast, Alexander Zhilkin, and opened to visitors in 2018. The center serves as an educational immersive environment, as a location for historical festivals and reenactor events, camel rides, souvenir shopping, and visits to the archaeological site of Selitrennoe gorodishche.

== See also ==
- Bakhchisaray
- Elista
