= Tambovka =

Name of several Russian rural localities

Tambovka (Russian: Тамбо́вка) is the name of several rural localities in Russia:

- Tambovka, Amur Oblast, a selo in Tambovsky Rural Settlement of Tambovsky District of Amur Oblast
- Tambovka, Astrakhan Oblast, a selo in Tambovsky Selsoviet of Kharabalinsky District of Astrakhan Oblast
- Tambovka, Republic of Bashkortostan, a village in Polyakovsky Selsoviet of Davlekanovsky District of the Republic of Bashkortostan
- Tambovka, Sargatsky District, Omsk Oblast, a village in Verblyuzhensky Rural Okrug of Sargatsky District of Omsk Oblast
- Tambovka, Sedelnikovsky District, Omsk Oblast, a village in Yevlantyevsky Rural Okrug of Sedelnikovsky District of Omsk Oblast
- Tambovka, Rostov Oblast, a khutor in Khleborobnoye Rural Settlement of Tselinsky District of Rostov Oblast
- Tambovka, Samara Oblast, a selo in Bolsheglushitsky District of Samara Oblast
- Tambovka, Saratov Oblast, a selo in Fyodorovsky District of Saratov Oblast
- Tambovka, Talovsky District, Voronezh Oblast, a settlement in Anokhinskoye Rural Settlement of Talovsky District of Voronezh Oblast
- Tambovka, Ternovsky District, Voronezh Oblast, a selo in Tambovskoye Rural Settlement of Ternovsky District of Voronezh Oblast
