= List of equipment of the Armed Forces of Belarus =

This is a list of the equipment used by the Armed Forces of Belarus. The military forces of Belarus are almost exclusively armed with Soviet-era equipment inherited from the Soviet Union. Although large in numbers, some western experts consider some of it outdated.

== Infantry gears ==
Model	Image	Picture	Notes
Attire
EMR camouflage			Standard issue
Combat helmet
6B27 6B47			Standard issue
Skat-R			Used by special force
Bulletproof vest
6B45			Standard issue
Foot wear
Boots			Standard issue

== Infantry weapons ==
Model	Image	Caliber	Origin	Type	Notes
Pistols
TT pistol		7.62×25mm Tokarev	Soviet Union	Semi-automatic pistol	Issued to Territorial Defense units.
PSM		5.45×18mm	Soviet Union	Semi-automatic pistol	
Makarov PM		9×18mm Makarov	Soviet Union	Semi-automatic pistol	
Stechkin		9×18mm Makarov	Soviet Union	Selective fire machine pistol	
Glock 17		9×19mm Parabellum	Austria	Semi-automatic pistol	Used by OMON, "Almaz" counter-terrorist unit, KGB Alpha Group.
SIG Sauer P226		9×19mm Parabellum	West Germany; Switzerland	Semi-automatic pistol	P226 used by Special Forces, OSAM (Border guard) "Almaz", KGB Alpha Group, and SBP (Presidential security).
Submachine guns
Heckler & Koch MP5		9×19mm Parabellum	West Germany Turkey	Submachine gun	MP5A3 and MP5SD3, MP5A5, MP5K variants imported from Turkey.
Shotguns
Remington Model 870		12-gauge	United States	Pump-action combat shotgun	Used by Ministry of Interior units or paratroopers.
Mossberg 500		12-gauge	United States	Pump-action combat shotgun	Used by OMON, Almaz, and KGB Alpha group. The Mossberg Maverick 88 is also used.
Benelli M4		12-gauge	Italy	Semi-automatic combat shotgun	Used by OMON, "Almaz" counter-terrorist unit, Border Guard Service Institute and KGB Alpha Group. Seen in use with security forces in Minsk during the 2020 protests.
Assault rifles
AKM		7.62×39mm	Soviet Union	Assault rifle	
AK-74		5.45×39mm	Soviet Union	Assault rifle	Standard service rifle.
VSK-100		7.62x39mm	Belarus	Assault rifle	Entered service in early 2021.
SMAR-100BPM		7.62x39 mm	Belarus	Assault rifle	
AK-12		5.45×39mm	Russian Federation	Assault rifle	Used by special forces.
AKS-74		5.45×39mm	Soviet Union	Assault rifle	
AKS-74U		5.45×39mm	Soviet Union	Assault carbine	Mostly used by armored vehicle crews
AS Val		9×39mm	Soviet Union	Suppressed assault rifle	Used by special forces.
9A-91		9×39mm	Russian Federation	Carbine	
Sniper rifles and designated marksman rifles
VSS Vintorez		9×39mm	Soviet Union	Suppressed sniper rifle	Used by special forces.
Dragunov SVD		7.62×54mmR	Soviet Union	Semi-automatic designated marksman rifle	
MTs-116M		7.62×54mmR	Russia	Bolt-action sniper rifle	Used by special forces (SSO).
Orsis T-5000		.338 Lapua Magnum	Russia	Bolt-action sniper rifle	Used by special forces.
SV-1000 Stiletto		7.62×54mmR	Belarus	High-precision sniper rifle	Used by special forces.
OSV-96		12.7×108mm	Russia	Anti-materiel sniper rifle	Used by special forces.
Machine guns
PK machine gun		7.62×54mmR	Soviet Union	General-purpose machine gun	PKM variant used. Manufactured locally.
RPK		7.62×39mm	Soviet Union	Squad automatic weapon	Issued to Territorial Defense units. Manufactured locally.
RPK-74		5.45×39mm	Soviet Union	Squad automatic weapon	
DShK		12.7×108mm	Soviet Union	Heavy machine gun	
NSV		12.7×108mm	Soviet Union	Heavy machine gun	
Grenade launchers
GP-25/30/34		40 mm VOG-25	Soviet Union; Russian Federation; Russia	Underslung grenade launcher	
AGS-17		30×29mm grenade	Soviet Union	Automatic grenade launcher	
Rocket propelled grenade launchers
RPO-A Shmel		93 mm	Soviet Union; Russian Federation; Russia	Rocket-propelled grenade	The PDM-A Priz is replacing the RPO-A Shmel flamethrower.
RPG-7		40 mm (launcher only, warhead diameter varies)	Soviet Union	Rocket-propelled grenade	
LMGK-60 Sapfir		40 mm	Belarus	Rocket-propelled grenade	Entered service in December 2024 and launched into series production.
RPG-26		72.5 mm	Soviet Union	Rocket-propelled grenade	
Recoilless rifles
SPG-9		73 mm	Soviet Union	Recoilless rifle	Used by Territorial Defense units.
Anti-tank guided missiles
9K111 Fagot		120 mm	Soviet Union	Anti-tank guided missile	
9M113 Konkurs		135 mm	Soviet Union; Belarus	Anti-tank guided missile	Upgraded 9P135M1(RB) Konkurs launchers used.
9K115 Metis		94 mm	Soviet Union	Anti-tank guided missile	Used by Territorial Defense units.
Shershen		130 mm & 152 mm	Belarus; Ukraine	Anti-tank guided missile	Belarusian variant of the Ukrainian Skif ATGM.
Mortars
M-43		82 mm	Soviet Union	Infantry mortar	
2B11		120 mm	Soviet Union	Heavy mortar	

== Vehicles ==
Name	Image	Origin	In service	Notes
Tanks
T-72B		Soviet Union	577	
T-72B3 mod		Soviet Union; Russian Federation	20	
T-72BM2		Soviet Union; Belarus	30+	
Armoured fighting vehicles
BRM-1		Soviet Union	132	
BRDM-2RKh		Soviet Union	N/A	Used by NBC Protection Troops.
Caiman		Belarus	15+	Used by special forces and a modified variant is used by NBC Protection Troops.
MT-LB		Soviet Union	78+	Some were modified as armoured engineering vehicles.
RKhM-4		Russian Federation	N/A	Used by NBC Protection Troops.
Infantry fighting vehicles
BMP-2		Soviet Union	906	20 BMP-2 were transferred to the Russian Armed Forces in 2022.
BTR-82A		Soviet Union Russia	70	
Armoured personnel carriers
BTR-70MB1		Soviet Union; Belarus	64	Used by special forces.
BTR-80		Soviet Union	153	Can be equipped with slat armour.
Infantry mobility vehicles
GAZ Tigr-M		Russia	30	
Dongfeng EQ2050		China	22	Chinese copy based on the US Humvee, Used by Belarusian special forces.
Volat V1		Belarus	~55	The MZKT-690003-021 V-2 with the Adunok-BM.2 combat module completed state trials and entered service on 16 May 2025.
Dajiang CS/VN3		China	12	Used by special forces.
Engineering vehicles
BAT-2		Soviet Union	N/A	
IMR-2(M)		Soviet Union	N/A	
BREM-K		Soviet Union Russia	N/A	
MTU-20		Soviet Union	20	
MT-55A		Soviet Union Czechoslovakia	4	
UR-77 'Meteorit'		Soviet Union	N/A	
AT-6 and AT-12		Belarus	19	Fuel tankers. Entered service in 2026.
Self-propelled Anti-Tank missile systems
9P148 Konkurs		Soviet Union	75	
9P149 Shturm-S		Soviet Union	85	
Towed artillery
82mm 2B9 Vasilek		Soviet Union	N/A	Used by Territorial Defense units.
100mm MT-12 Rapira		Soviet Union	N/A	Used by Territorial Defense units.
120mm 2B23 NONA-M1		Soviet Union	18	Used by special forces.
122mm D-30		Soviet Union	24	Used by special forces.
152mm 2A65 Msta-B		Soviet Union	108	
Self-propelled artillery
122mm 2S1 Gvozdika		Soviet Union	125	
152mm 2S3(M) Akatsiya		Soviet Union	164+	
152mm 2S5 Giatsint-S		Soviet Union	107	
Multiple rocket launchers		Soviet Union		
122mm BM-21 Grad		Soviet Union Belarus	128	Modernized to the BM-21A "BelGrad" standard. Currently being upgraded to the BM-21B "BelGrad 2" standard.
220mm BM-27 Uragan		Soviet Union Belarus	36	Being upgraded to the Uragan-M standard.
300mm BM-30 Smerch		Soviet Union	36	
Guided Multiple Rocket Launchers
Polonez		China; Belarus	12	Range: 200km, CEP: 30m, Chinese-designed A200 guided rocket produced in Belarus.
Polonez-M		China; Belarus	12	Range: 290km, CEP: 45m, Chinese-designed A300 guided rocket produced in Belarus.
Short-range ballistic missiles
OTR-21 Tochka-U		Soviet Union	36	Range: 120km, CEP: 95m, slated for replacement by the Chinese-designed M20 SRBM fired from the Polonez launcher.
9K720 Iskander		Soviet Union; Russian Federation	4	4 Launchers and 25 Iskander-M missiles delivered in 2022.
Anti-Aircraft Guns
14.5mm ZPU-4		Soviet Union	N/A	Used by Territorial Defense units.
23mm ZU-23		Soviet Union	N/A	Mounted on technicals.
Self-Propelled Anti-Aircraft Guns
30mm 2K22(M) Tunguska		Soviet Union	N/A	
Self-propelled surface-to-air missile (SAM) systems
9K35 Strela-10		Soviet Union	200+	Range: 5km.
9K33 Osa		Soviet Union; Belarus	76	Range: 15km. Being modernized to the 9A33-2B standard.
Tor missile system Tor-M2K		Soviet Union; Russian Federation	21. 1 more battery delivered in November 2024. Additional systems were delivered in November 2025.	Range: 16km.
9K37 Buk		Soviet Union	16	Range: 25km.
S-300PS		Soviet Union	48	Range: 90km. 4 batteries delivered by Russia in 2006, possibly in exchange for TELs for the Topol-M ICBM system.
S-300PMU		Soviet Union Russia	4	4 batteries and 150 missiles delivered by Russia between 2015 and 2016 as part of a joint air defense agreement.
S-400 Triumf		Soviet Union Russia	16	Two batteries were ordered in 2021, the first one was delivered in 2022, the second in 2023.
Electronic warfare systems
SPN-30		Soviet Union	N/A	
Groza R-934UM2 'Groza-6'		Belarus	N/A	
Sapsan		Belarus	N/A	Mobile anti-drone system. Uses EW and fire defeat means.
Groza Z1/R-936 Aero/Optima 2.2		Belarus	N/A	Entered service in December 2025.
Radars and communications systems
P-18 'Spoon Rest D'		Soviet Union	N/A	
P-35/37 'Bar Lock'		Soviet Union	N/A	
PRV-9 'Thin Skin E'		Soviet Union	N/A	
PRV-16 'Thin Skin B'		Soviet Union	N/A	
36D6 'Tin Shield'		Soviet Union	N/A	
55ZH6 'Tall Rack'		Soviet Union	N/A	
1L22 'Parol'		Soviet Union	N/A	
1S80 'Sborka' PPRU		Soviet Union	N/A	
Rosa-RB-M Ashuluk		Belarus	N/A	
Rodnik-3D		Belarus	1	
Vostok-3D		Belarus	N/A	
Protivnik-GE		Belarus	N/A	
9S18 'Kupol'		Soviet Union	N/A	Used for the Buk.
30N6 'Flad Lid'		Soviet Union	N/A	Used for the S-300.
76N6 'Clam Shell'		Soviet Union	N/A	Used for the S-300.
91N6 'Big Bird'		Soviet Union	N/A	Used for the S-300.
R-414MBRP		Belarus	Several	Digital radio-relay station.
Unmanned aerial vehicles
Orlan-10		Russia	N/A	
Supercam S100		Russia	N/A	
Supercam S350		Russia	N/A	
Irkut-3		Russia	N/A	
Irkut-10		Russia	N/A	
Formula		Belarus	N/A	
VR-12 Moskit-N		Belarus	N/A	
Busel M		Belarus	N/A	
Berkut-3		Belarus	N/A	
Chekan-B		Belarus	N/A	
Kvadro-1400		Belarus	N/A	
Barraging pipe		Belarus	N/A	

== Bibliography ==
- International Institute for Strategic Studies (12 February 2025). The Military Balance 2025. London: Routledge. ISBN 978-1-003-63076-0.
- Jones, Richard; Ness, Leland S., eds. (2010). Jane's Infantry Weapons 2010-2011. Jane's Information Group. ISBN 978-0-7106-2908-1.
