= Seroglazovo =

Seroglazovo Сероглазово
- Settlement
- Interactive map of Seroglazovo
- Location within Astrakhan Oblast Location within Russia
- Coordinates: 47°08′N 47°41′E
- Country: Russia
- Region: Astrakhan Oblast
- District: Kharabalinsky District
- Time zone: UTC+4:00

Seroglazovo (Russian: Сероглазово) is a rural locality (a settlement) in Volensky Selsoviet, Kharabalinsky District, Astrakhan Oblast, Russia. The population was 490 as of 2010. There are 7 streets.

== Geography ==
Seroglazovo is located 54 km southeast of Kharabali (the district's administrative centre) by road. Volnoye is the nearest rural locality.
