= Zelyonyye Prudy =

Zelyonyye Prudy Зелёные Пруды
- Settlement
- Interactive map of Zelyonyye Prudy
- Location within Astrakhan Oblast Location within Russia
- Coordinates: 47°29′N 46°57′E
- Country: Russia
- Region: Astrakhan Oblast
- District: Kharabalinsky District
- Time zone: UTC+4:00

Zelyonyye Prudy (Russian: Зеленые Пруды) is a rural locality (a selo) in Sasykolsky Selsoviet, Kharabalinsky District, Astrakhan Oblast, Russia. The population was 3 as of 2010. There is 1 street.

== Geography ==
Zelyonyye Prudy is located 39 km northwest of Kharabali (the district's administrative centre) by road. Sasykoli is the nearest rural locality.
