= Zaykovka =

Zaykovka Зайковка
- Selo
- Interactive map of Zaykovka
- Location within Astrakhan Oblast Location within Russia
- Coordinates: 46°35′N 48°17′E
- Country: Russia
- Region: Astrakhan Oblast
- District: Krasnoyarsky District
- Time zone: UTC+4:00

Zaykovka (Russian: Зайковка) is a rural locality (a selo) in Baybeksky Selsoviet, Krasnoyarsky District, Astrakhan Oblast, Russia. The population was 64 as of 2010. There is 1 street.

== Geography ==
Zaykovka is located 9 km north of Krasny Yar (the district's administrative centre) by road. Pereprava Korsaka and Alcha are the nearest rural localities.
