= Tambovka, Astrakhan Oblast =

Tambovka Тамбовка
- Selo
- Interactive map of Tambovka
- Location within Astrakhan Oblast Location within Russia
- Coordinates: 47°18′N 47°23′E
- Country: Russia
- Region: Astrakhan Oblast
- District: Kharabalinsky District
- Time zone: UTC+4:00

Tambovka (Russian: Тамбовка) is a rural locality (a selo) and the administrative center of Tambovsky Selsoviet, Kharabalinsky District, Astrakhan Oblast, Russia. The population was 2,431 as of 2010. There are 31 streets.

== Geography ==
Tambovka is located on the Ashuluk River, 16 km southeast of Kharabali (the district's administrative centre) by road. Ashuluk is the nearest rural locality.
