= Kochkovatka =

Kochkovatka Кочковатка
- Selo
- Interactive map of Kochkovatka
- Location within Astrakhan Oblast Location within Russia
- Coordinates: 47°32′36″N 47°02′17″E
- Country: Russia
- Region: Astrakhan Oblast
- District: Kharabalinsky District
- Time zone: UTC+4:00

Kochkovatka (Russian: Кочковатка) is a rural locality (a selo) and the administrative center of Kochkovatsky Selsoviet, Kharabalinsky District, Astrakhan Oblast, Russia. The population was 1,597 as of 2010. There are 20 streets.

== Geography ==
Kochkovatka is located 26 km northwest of Kharabali (the district's administrative centre) by road. Sasykoli is the nearest rural locality.
