= Alcha =

Alcha Алча
- Settlement
- Location within Astrakhan Oblast Location within Russia
- Coordinates: 46°34′N 48°19′E
- Country: Russia
- Region: Astrakhan Oblast
- District: Krasnoyarsky District
- Time zone: UTC+4:00

Alcha (Russian: Алча) is a rural locality (a settlement) in Krasnoyarsky District, Astrakhan Oblast, Russia. The population was 1,014 as of 2010. There are 18 streets.

== Geography ==
Alcha is located 7 km north of Krasny Yar (the district's administrative centre) by road. Pervomaysky is the nearest rural locality.
