= Podchalyk =

Podchalyk Подчалык
- Settlement
- Location within Astrakhan Oblast Location within Russia
- Coordinates: 46°38′N 48°16′E
- Country: Russia
- Region: Astrakhan Oblast
- District: Krasnoyarsky District
- Time zone: UTC+4:00

Podchalyk (Russian: Подчалык) is a rural locality (a settlement) in Dzhanaysky Selsoviet, Krasnoyarsky District, Astrakhan Oblast, Russia. The population was 28 as of 2010. There is 1 street.

== Geography ==
Podchalyk is located 15 km north of Krasny Yar (the district's administrative centre) by road. Pereprava Korsaka is the nearest rural locality.
