= Kondakovka =

Kondakovka Кондаковка
- Selo
- Location within Astrakhan Oblast Location within Russia
- Coordinates: 46°32′N 48°25′E
- Country: Russia
- Region: Astrakhan Oblast
- District: Krasnoyarsky District
- Time zone: UTC+4:00

Kondakovka (Russian: Кондаковка) is a rural locality (a selo) in Vatazhensky Selsoviet, Krasnoyarsky District, Astrakhan Oblast, Russia. The population was 112 as of 2010. There are 4 streets.

== Geography ==
Kondakovka is located 8 km east of Krasny Yar (the district's administrative centre) by road. Vatazhnoye is the nearest rural locality.
