= Starourusovka =

Starourusovka Староурусовка
- Selo
- Location within Astrakhan Oblast Location within Russia
- Coordinates: 46°42′N 48°00′E
- Country: Russia
- Region: Astrakhan Oblast
- District: Krasnoyarsky District
- Time zone: UTC+4:00

Starourusovka (Russian: Староурусовка) is a rural locality (a selo) in Buzansky Selsoviet, Krasnoyarsky District, Astrakhan Oblast, Russia. The population was 142 as of 2010. There is 1 street.

== Geography ==
Starourusovka is located 44 km northwest of Krasny Yar (the district's administrative centre) by road. Buzan is the nearest rural locality.
