= Dosang =

Dosang Досанг
- Settlement
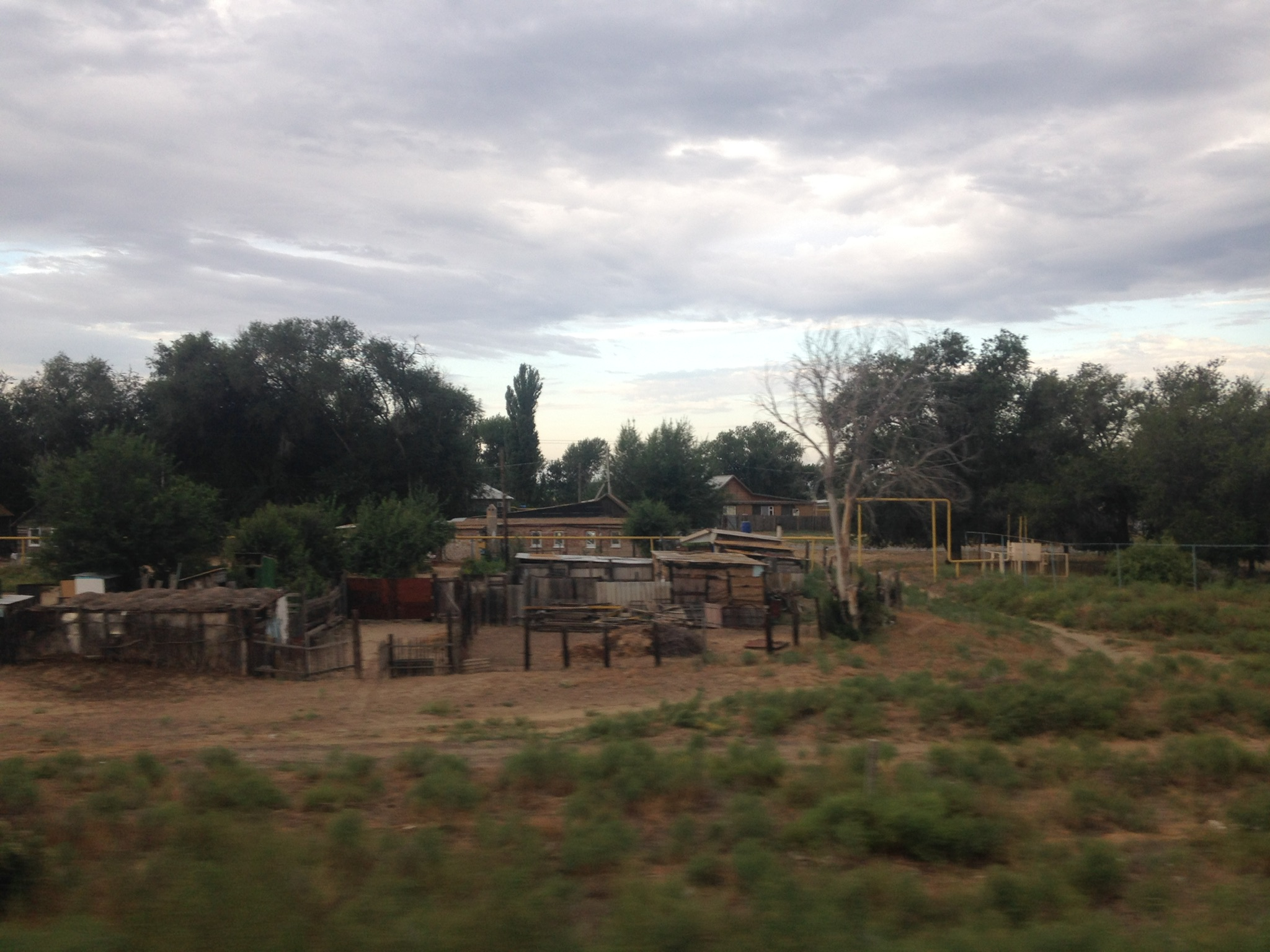

- Location within Astrakhan Oblast Location within Russia
- Coordinates: 46°54′N 47°54′E
- Country: Russia
- Region: Astrakhan Oblast
- District: Krasnoyarsky District
- Time zone: UTC+4:00

Dosang (Russian: Досанг) is a rural locality (a settlement) in Akhtubinsky Selsoviet, Krasnoyarsky District, Astrakhan Oblast, Russia. The population was 734 as of 2010. There are 5 streets.

== Geography ==
Dosang is located 59 km north of Krasny Yar (the district's administrative centre) by road. Topal is the nearest rural locality.
