= Dolginsky =

Dolginsky Долгинский
- Settlement
- Location within Astrakhan Oblast Location within Russia
- Coordinates: 46°28′N 48°36′E
- Country: Russia
- Region: Astrakhan Oblast
- District: Krasnoyarsky District
- Time zone: UTC+4:00

Dolginsky (Russian: Долгинский) is a rural locality (a settlement) in Vatazhensky Selsoviet, Krasnoyarsky District, Astrakhan Oblast, Russia. The population was 92 as of 2010. There is 1 street.

== Geography ==
Dolginsky is located 27 km southeast of Krasny Yar (the district's administrative centre) by road. Tyurino is the nearest rural locality.
