= Baybek =

Baybek Байбек
- Selo
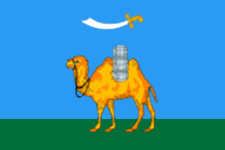
- Flag

- Location within Astrakhan Oblast Location within Russia
- Coordinates: 46°39′N 48°27′E
- Country: Russia
- Region: Astrakhan Oblast
- District: Krasnoyarsky District
- Time zone: UTC+4:00

Baybek (Russian: Байбек) is a rural locality (a selo) and the administrative center of Baybeksky Selsoviet, Krasnoyarsky District, Astrakhan Oblast, Russia. The population was 1,911 as of 2010. There are 17 streets.

== Geography ==
Baybek is located on the Kigach River, 22 km northeast of Krasny Yar (the district's administrative centre) by road. Maly Aral is the nearest rural locality.
