= Bugor =

Bugor Бугор
- Settlement
- Interactive map of Bugor
- Location within Astrakhan Oblast Location within Russia
- Coordinates: 47°33′48″N 46°54′53″E
- Country: Russia
- Region: Astrakhan Oblast
- District: Kharabalinsky District
- Time zone: UTC+4:00

Bugor (Russian: Бугор) is a rural locality (a settlement) in Sasykolsky Selsoviet, Kharabalinsky District, Astrakhan Oblast, Russia. The recorded population was 303 as of 2010. There are 9 streets.

== Geography ==
Bugor is located 35 km northwest of Kharabali (the district's administrative centre) by road. Sasykoli is the nearest rural locality.
