= Mayachnoye =

Mayachnoye (Russian: Маячное) is the name of several rural localities in Russia:

- Mayachnoye, Ikryaninsky District, Astrakhan Oblast, a selo in Ikryaninsky District, Astrakhan Oblast
- Mayachnoye, Krasnoyarsky District, Astrakhan Oblast, a selo in Krasnoyarsky District, Astrakhan Oblast
