= Baklanye =

Baklanye Бакланье
- Selo
- Location within Astrakhan Oblast Location within Russia
- Coordinates: 46°28′N 48°41′E
- Country: Russia
- Region: Astrakhan Oblast
- District: Krasnoyarsky District
- Time zone: UTC+4:00

Baklanye (Russian: Бакланье) is a rural locality (a selo) in Vatazhensky Selsoviet, Krasnoyarsky District, Astrakhan Oblast, Russia. The population was 581 as of 2010. There are 5 streets.

== Geography ==
Baklanye is located 35 km southeast of Krasny Yar (the district's administrative centre) by road. Dolginsky is the nearest rural locality.
