= Zabuzan =

Zabuzan Забузан
- Selo
- Interactive map of Zabuzan
- Location within Astrakhan Oblast Location within Russia
- Coordinates: 46°31′N 48°18′E
- Country: Russia
- Region: Astrakhan Oblast
- District: Krasnoyarsky District
- Time zone: UTC+4:00

Zabuzan (Russian: Забузан) is a rural locality (a selo) and the administrative center of Zabuzansky Selsoviet, Krasnoyarsky District, Astrakhan Oblast, Russia. The population was 1,614 as of 2010. There are 27 streets.

== Geography ==
It is located on the Buzan River, 8 km southwest of Krasny Yar (the district's administrative centre) by road. Solnechny is the nearest rural locality.
