= Krivoy Buzan =

Krivoy Buzan Кривой Бузан
- Selo
- Location within Astrakhan Oblast Location within Russia
- Coordinates: 46°30′N 48°31′E
- Country: Russia
- Region: Astrakhan Oblast
- District: Krasnoyarsky District
- Time zone: UTC+4:00

Krivoy Buzan (Russian: Кривой Бузан) is a rural locality (a selo) in Vatazhensky Selsoviet, Krasnoyarsky District, Astrakhan Oblast, Russia. The population was 758 as of 2010. There are 10 streets.

== Geography ==
Krivoy Buzan is located 20 km east of Krasny Yar (the district's administrative centre) by road. Pushkino is the nearest rural locality.
