= Sasykoli =

Sasykoli Сасыколи
- Selo
- Interactive map of Sasykoli
- Location within Astrakhan Oblast Location within Russia
- Coordinates: 47°32′N 46°59′E
- Country: Russia
- Region: Astrakhan Oblast
- District: Kharabalinsky District
- Time zone: UTC+4:00

Sasykoli (Russian: Сасыколи) is a rural locality (a selo) and the administrative center of Sasykolsky Selsoviet, Kharabalinsky District, Astrakhan Oblast, Russia. The population was 5,224 as of 2010. There are 70 streets.

== Geography ==
Sasykoli is located on the Ashuluk River, 29 km northwest of Kharabali (the district's administrative centre) by road. Kochkovatka is the nearest rural locality.
