= Khosheutovo =

Khosheutovo Хошеутово
- Selo
- Interactive map of Khosheutovo
- Location within Astrakhan Oblast Location within Russia
- Coordinates: 47°01′N 47°48′E
- Country: Russia
- Region: Astrakhan Oblast
- District: Kharabalinsky District
- Time zone: UTC+4:00

Khosheutovo (Russian: Хошеутово) is a rural locality (a selo) and the administrative center of Khosheutovsky Selsoviet, Kharabalinsky District, Astrakhan Oblast, Russia. The population was 2,097 as of 2010. There are 29 streets.

== Geography ==
Khosheutovo is located 71 km southeast of Kharabali (the district's administrative centre) by road. Akhtubinka is the nearest rural locality.
