= Mayachnoye, Krasnoyarsky District, Astrakhan Oblast =

Mayachnoye Маячное
- Selo
- Location within Astrakhan Oblast Location within Russia
- Coordinates: 46°32′N 48°20′E
- Country: Russia
- Region: Astrakhan Oblast
- District: Krasnoyarsky District
- Time zone: UTC+4:00

Mayachnoye (Russian: Маячное) is a rural locality (a selo) in Krasnoyarsky District, Astrakhan Oblast, Russia. The population was 900 as of 2010. There are 46 streets.

== Geography ==
Mayachnoye is located 2 km north of Krasny Yar (the district's administrative centre) by road. Krasny Yar is the nearest rural locality.
