= Vorobyevsky, Astrakhan Oblast =

Vorobyevsky Воробьёвский
- Settlement
- Interactive map of Vorobyevsky
- Location within Astrakhan Oblast Location within Russia
- Coordinates: 46°49′N 48°18′E
- Country: Russia
- Region: Astrakhan Oblast
- District: Krasnoyarsky District
- Time zone: UTC+4:00

Vorobyevsky (Russian: Воробьёвский) is a rural locality (a settlement) in Zabuzansky Selsoviet, Krasnoyarsky District, Astrakhan Oblast, Russia. The population was 110 as of 2010. There are 9 streets.

== Geography ==
Vorobyevsky is located 7 km southwest of Krasny Yar (the district's administrative centre) by road. Zabuzan is the nearest rural locality.
