= Wollny =

Wollny is a surname. It is a spelling variant of Wolny, Volny, or Volný. Notable people with the surname include:

- Ewald Wollny (1846–1901), German physicist
- Michael Wollny (born 1978), German jazz pianist and music educator
- Peter Wollny (born 1961), German musicologist
