= 336th Rocket Artillery Brigade =

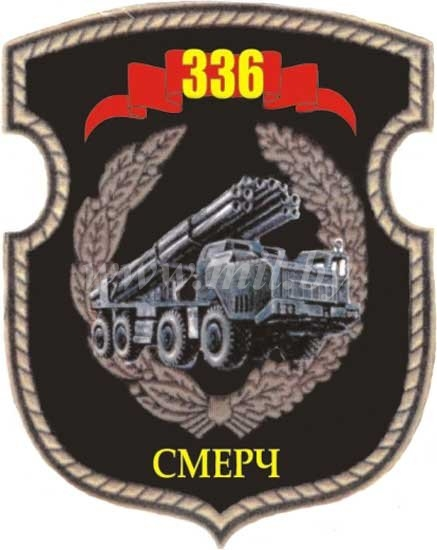
- Sleeve insignia of the 336th Missile Brigade
- Active: 1972–present
- Country: Soviet Union (1972–1991); Belarus (1992–present)
- Branch: Soviet Army (1972–1991); Belarusian Ground Forces (1992–present)
- Type: Rocket artillery
- Size: 36 Smerch systems, six Polonez systems
- Part of: General Staff of the Armed Forces of Belarus
- Garrison/HQ: Yuzhny, Osipovichi
- Equipment: BM-30 Smerch, Polonez

The 336th Rocket Artillery Brigade (Russian: 336-я реактивная артиллерийская бригада (336 реабр); Latin alphabet abbreviation: (336 reabr); Military Unit Number 12180) is a rocket artillery brigade of the Belarusian Ground Forces. The only rocket artillery brigade of the Armed Forces of Belarus, the brigade is armed with BM-30 Smerch multiple rocket launcher system inherited from the Soviet Union with one battalion equipped with the domestically produced Polonez multiple rocket launcher. Based at the Yuzhny military base near Osipovichi, the brigade reports directly to the General Staff of the Armed Forces of Belarus.

== History ==
The history of the 336th Rocket Artillery Brigade began in 1972 with the formation at Osipovichi of the 1360th Rocket Artillery Regiment of the Soviet Army, part of the 51st Guards Artillery Division of the Belorussian Military District. 4 September is celebrated as the anniversary of the unit, which was originally equipped with the BM-21 Grad multiple rocket launcher system (MLRS). The regiment was formed from the 4th artillery battalion of the 121st Guards Artillery Brigade during the reorganization of the brigade into the 51st Guards Artillery Division. The regiment participated in the massive Exercise Zapad-81 Soviet maneuvers and was reorganized as the 336th Rocket Artillery Brigade in 1982 as the division transitioned from a regimental to a brigade structure. The brigade was initially armed with the BM-27 Uragan MLRS and in 1989 was rearmed with the BM-30 Smerch, making it one of three Smerch-equipped artillery brigades in the Soviet Army. The brigade was sent to the Kapustin Yar training ground in September 1990 to conduct experimental tactical exercises including live missile firing. According to 19 November 1990 data disclosed under the Treaty on Conventional Armed Forces in Europe, the brigade fielded 48 Smerch systems in addition to twelve 1V18 and four 1V19 command vehicles.

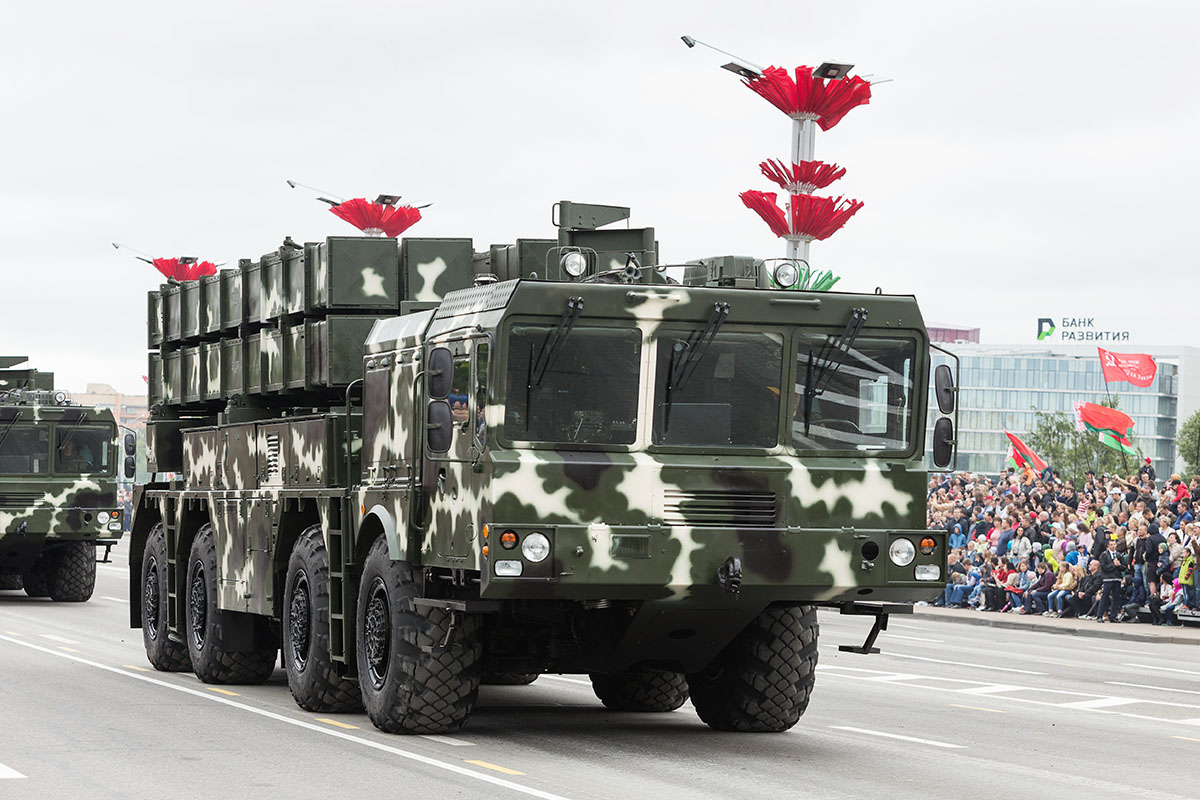
A Polonez MLRS system during the 2017 Minsk Independence Day Parade

After the Dissolution of the Soviet Union, the brigade became part of the Armed Forces of Belarus in 1992. By the reduction of the 51st Guards Artillery Division to a group on 1 August 1996, the 336th Reactive Artillery Brigade became a separate unit directly subordinated to the General Staff of the Armed Forces of Belarus. The brigade is the only unit of the Armed Forces of Belarus that operates the Smerch system and is stationed at the Yuzhny military base near Osipovichi. The brigade participated in the Chistoye nebo-2003 (Clear Sky) exercise in 2003. Between 20 and 26 January 2011, the brigade conducted an experimental tactical exercise with live missile launches at the Domanovo training ground. Later that year, it participated in joint exercises with Russia, Shchit Soyuza-2011 (Union Shield), in which brigade missile crews were sent to the Ashuluk training ground to launch maximum range missiles strikes for the first time. Due to a lack of adequately large training grounds in Belarus, the brigade is dependent on exercises in Russia and Kazakhstan for maximum range missile launches. As of 2017, most of the brigade's equipment was in long-term storage and vehicles in operation left the base mainly for exercises of less than two or three months' duration.

The 77th Separate Rocket Artillery Battalion was formed within the brigade in November 2016 to operate Belarus' newly delivered six Polonez MLRS, domestically produced with assistance from China based on their A-100/A-200 MRLS. According to International Institute for Strategic Studies Military Balance 2022 estimates, Belarus had 36 Smerch launchers remaining in its inventory, all operated by the 336th. The brigade includes three Smerch battalions, each including two firing batteries, a headquarters battery and a support platoon.
