= Vorobyovsky (rural locality) =

Vorobyovsky/Vorobyevsky (Russian: Воробьёвский; masculine), Vorobyovskaya/Vorobyevskaya (Воробьёвская; feminine), or Vorobyovskoye/Vorobyevskoye (Воробьёвское; neuter) is the name of several rural localities in Russia:

- Vorobyevsky, Astrakhan Oblast, a settlement in Zabuzansky Selsoviet of Krasnoyarsky District of Astrakhan Oblast
- Vorobyevsky, Novosibirsk Oblast, a settlement in Novosibirsky District of Novosibirsk Oblast
- Vorobyevskaya, a village in Oshevensky Selsoviet of Kargopolsky District of Arkhangelsk Oblast
