= Vorobyovsky =

Vorobyovsky/Vorobyevsky (masculine), Vorobyovskaya/Vorobyevskaya (feminine), or Vorobyovskoye/Vorobyevskoye (neuter) may refer to:

- Vorobyovsky District, a district of Voronezh Oblast, Russia
- Vorobyovsky (rural locality) (Vorobyovskaya, Vorobyovskoye), several rural localities in Russia
