= Volny =

Volny or Volný is a surname and placename. In many Slavic languages, it is an adjective meaning "free" (as in speech) and has various gender forms (Czech feminine: Volná; Russian feminine: Volnaya; Russian neuter: Volnoye). The Polish form is Wolny. Volny is also a romanization of a Russian plural noun meaning "waves". The surname or toponym may refer to:

== People ==
- Anatol Volny (1902–1937), Belarusian artist
- Lubomír Volný Lubomír Volný (born 1973), Czech politician
- Carl Volny (born 1987), Canadian football player
- Patrycja Volny (born 1988), Polish actress

== Places ==
- Volny (village), a village (khutor) in the Republic of Adygea, Russia
- Volnoye, Republic of Adygea, a village (selo) in the Republic of Adygea, Russia
- Volnoye, name of several other rural localities in Russia

== Other ==
- VOLNÝ, subsidiary of Telekom Austria in Czech Republic.

== See also ==
- Wolny, Polish surname
