= Volnoye, Astrakhan Oblast =

Volnoye Вольное
- Selo
- Interactive map of Volnoye
- Location within Astrakhan Oblast Location within Russia
- Coordinates: 47°8′N 47°38′E
- Country: Russia
- Region: Astrakhan Oblast
- District: Kharabalinsky District
- Time zone: UTC+4:00

Volnoye (Russian: Вольное) is a rural locality (a selo) and the administrative center of Volensky Selsoviet, Kharabalinsky District, Astrakhan Oblast, Russia. The population was 2,035 as of 2010. There are 35 streets.

== Geography ==
Volnoye is located 49 km southeast of Kharabali (the district's administrative centre) by road. Seroglazovo is the nearest rural locality.
