= Shershen =

Belarusian anti-tank guided missile

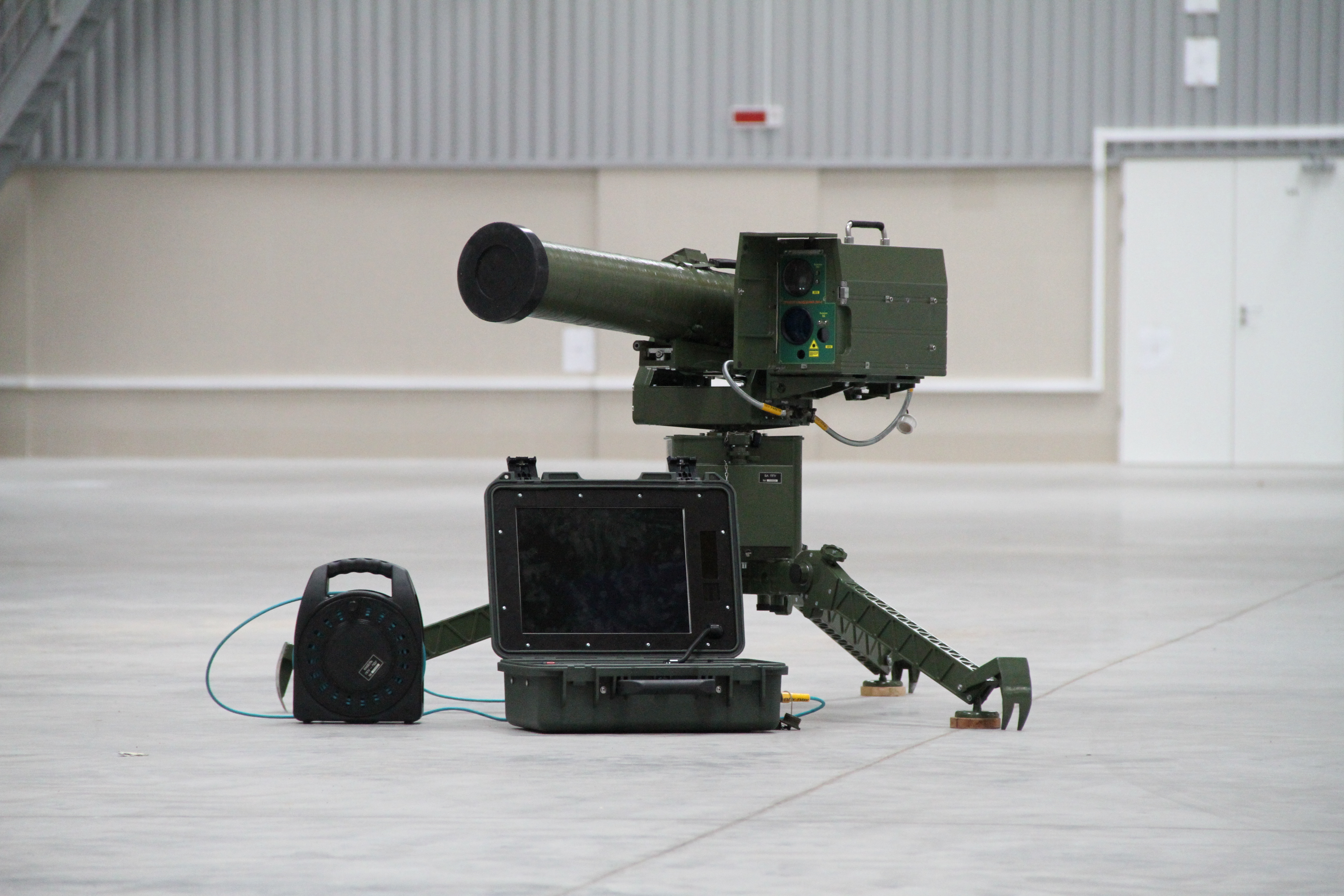
- A Shershen on a tripod.
- Type: ATGM
- Place of origin: Belarus; Ukraine

Service history
- In service: 2012−present
- Used by: See Users

Production history
- Designer: CJSC "SRPC"; JSC "Peleng" − Guidance device "Luch" Design Bureau − Anti-tank missile
- Designed: 2010
- Manufacturer: CJSC "SRPC"
- Produced: 2010−present
- Variants: See Variants

Specifications
- Detonation mechanism: Impact fuze
- Propellant: Solid-fuel rocket
- Guidance system: SACLOS laser beam riding
- Launch platform: Tripod, vehicle mount on roof

The Shershen (Russian: Шершень; English: Hornet) is a Belarusian third generation anti-tank guided missile (ATGM), based on Belarusian-Ukrainian ATGM Skif but reportedly with additional capabilities. Designed to defeat modern armored vehicles, protected objects (such as bunkers, pillboxes, earth-and-timber emplacements) and low-speed low-altitude targets (helicopters, UAVs).

== Description ==
The "Shershen" base version consists of a tripod, a universal combat module, an anti-tank guided missile, a guidance device (PN-S) and a remote control, which allows the control of the unit from up to 100 m (with a wire channel) and up to 300 m (with radio). The two-man crew's combat task is to assemble "Shershen", find the target and launch. The pre-launch procedures, which include missile installation, PN-S connection and unit switch-on, take less than 2 minutes to complete. Once the missile is fired, the operator controls the "Shershen" and corrects the aim, if necessary, using the joystick on the remote control.

Shershen is designed to destroy armored vehicles equipped with explosive reactive armor (ERA) and can attack stationary and moving targets. Shershen also has automated fire and forget targeting mode that doesn't require manual tracking of a target.

The R-2V missile (can be used with "Shershen-Q" and unified with ATGM "Barier-V" ) extends the maximum range to 7,500m. The ability to use different types of missiles without any system modification, in addition to a wide spectrum of targets makes it possible to consider this system not only as an ATGM, but as a mobile defence-assault fire system for infantry support up to battalion level.

== Variants ==
- "Shershen" — base version.
- "Shershen-L" — light version (maximum range up to 2.5 km.)
- "Shershen-D" — version with two firing channels.
- "Shershen-Q" — version with two firing channels and auto lifting system (or without auto lift) for installation on a vehicle.

== Users ==
- Belarus
- Georgia
- Ukraine
- Nigeria
- Turkmenistan

== Gallery ==
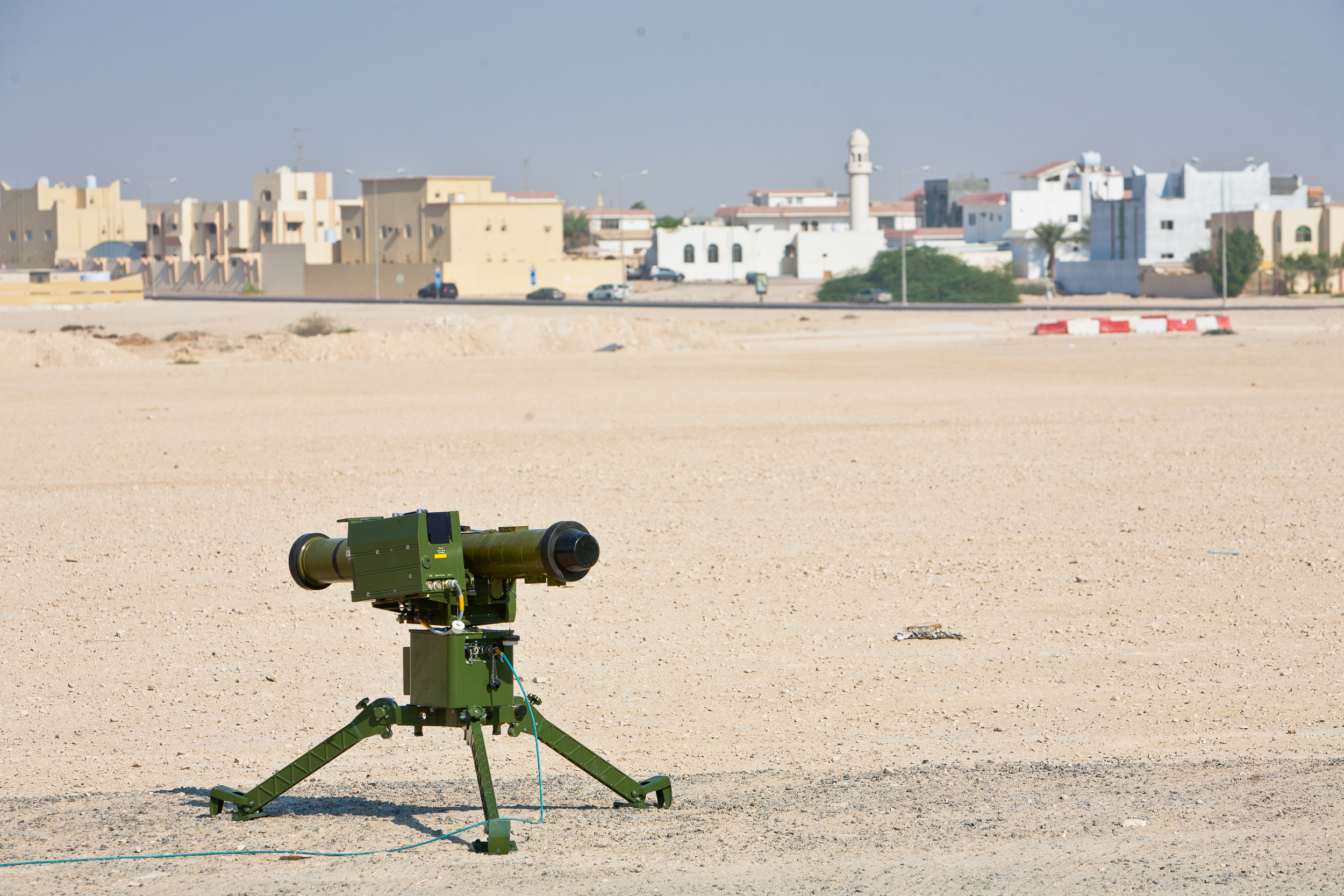
ATGM "Shershen" on position

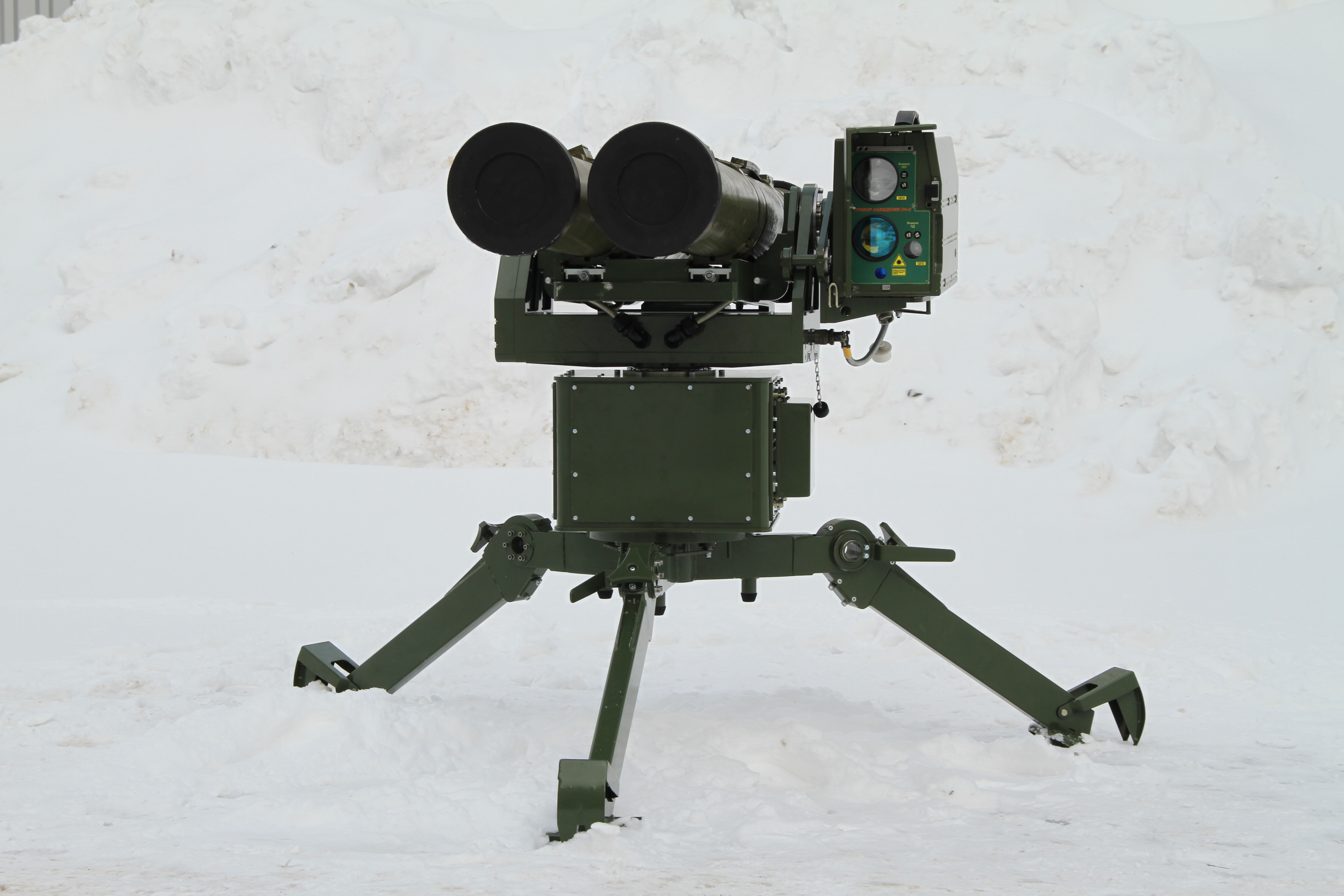
ATGM "Shershen-D

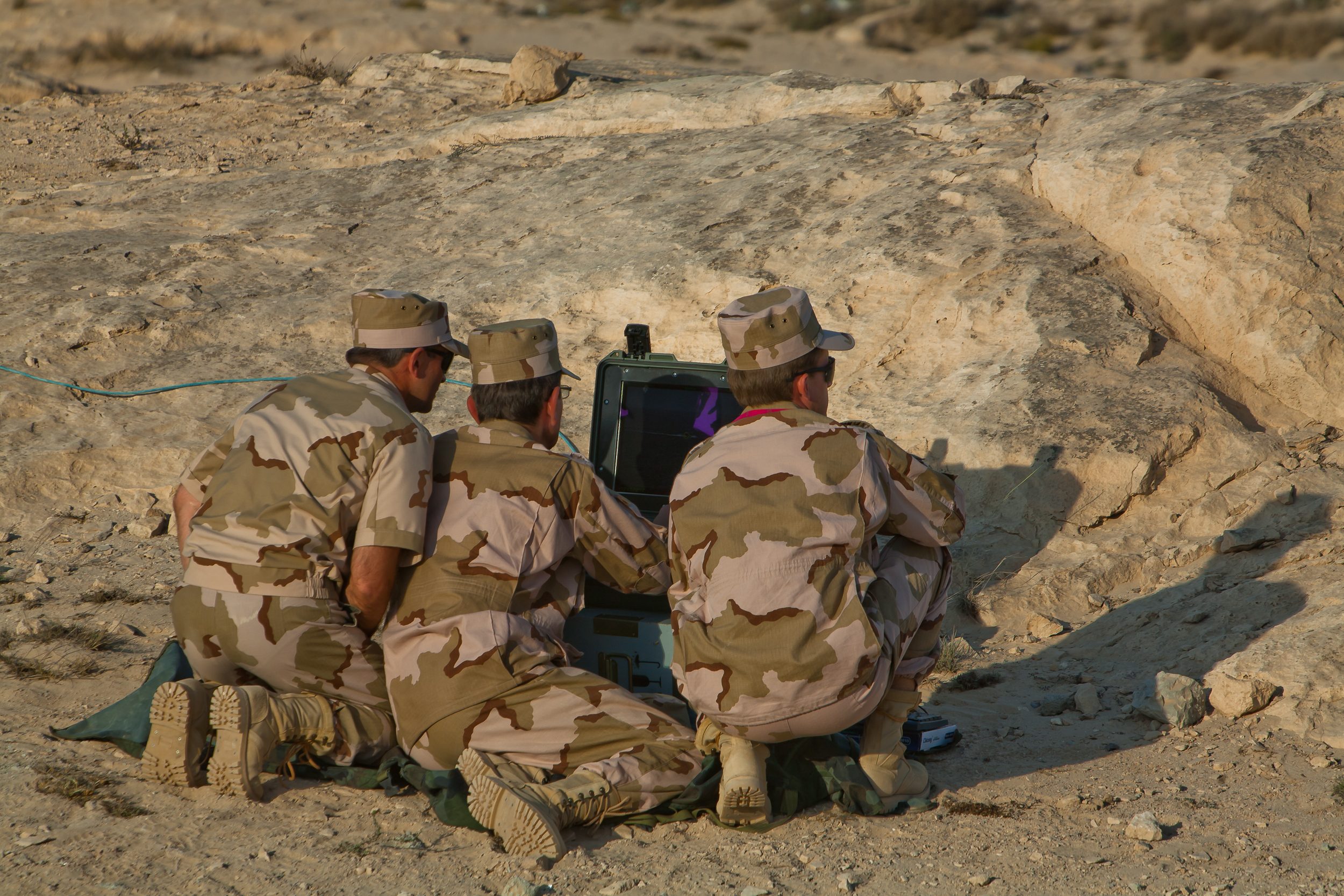
ATGM "Shershen" remote control

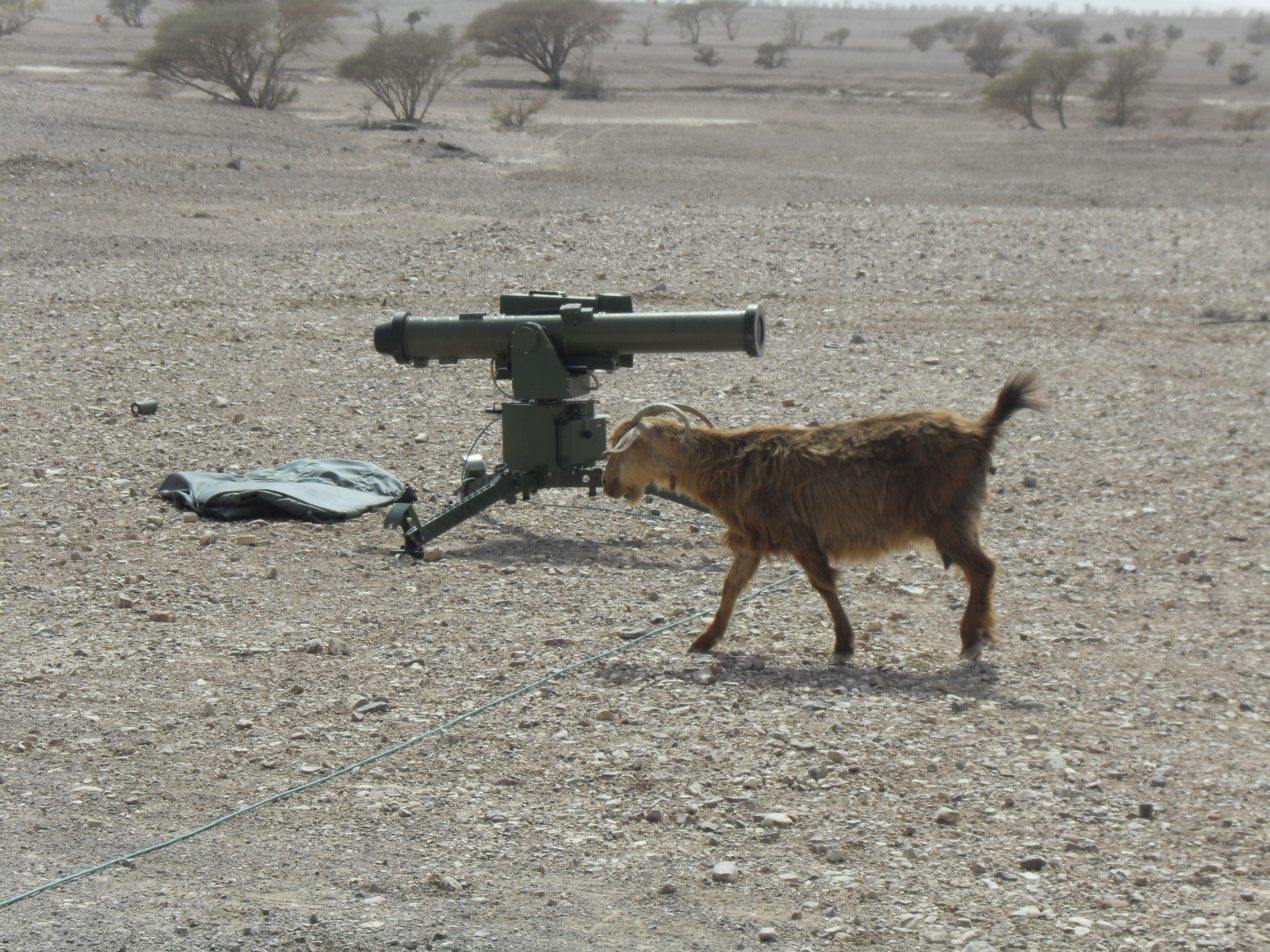
ATGM "Shershen" in hot conditions

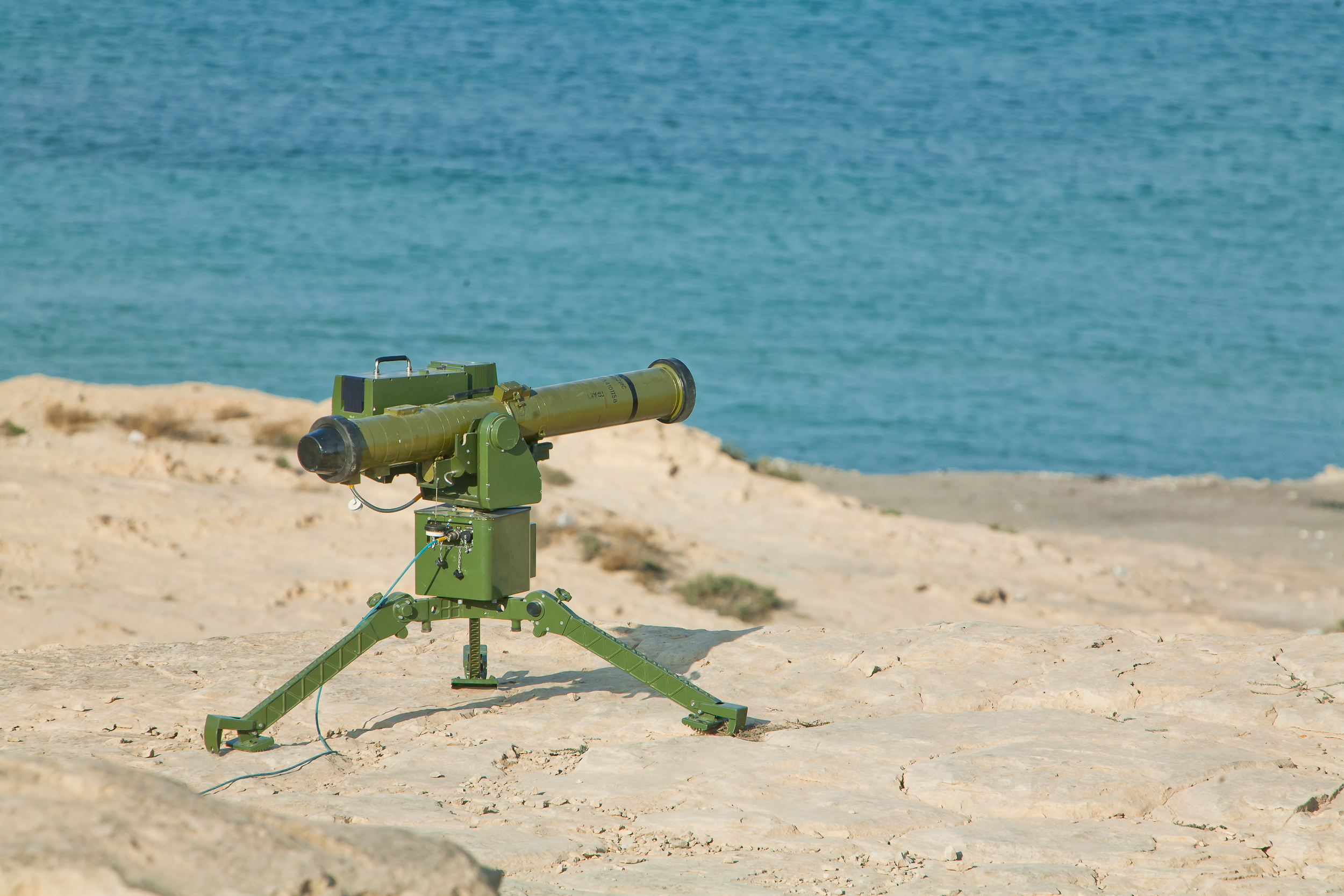
ATGM "Shershen" on the protection of the coastline

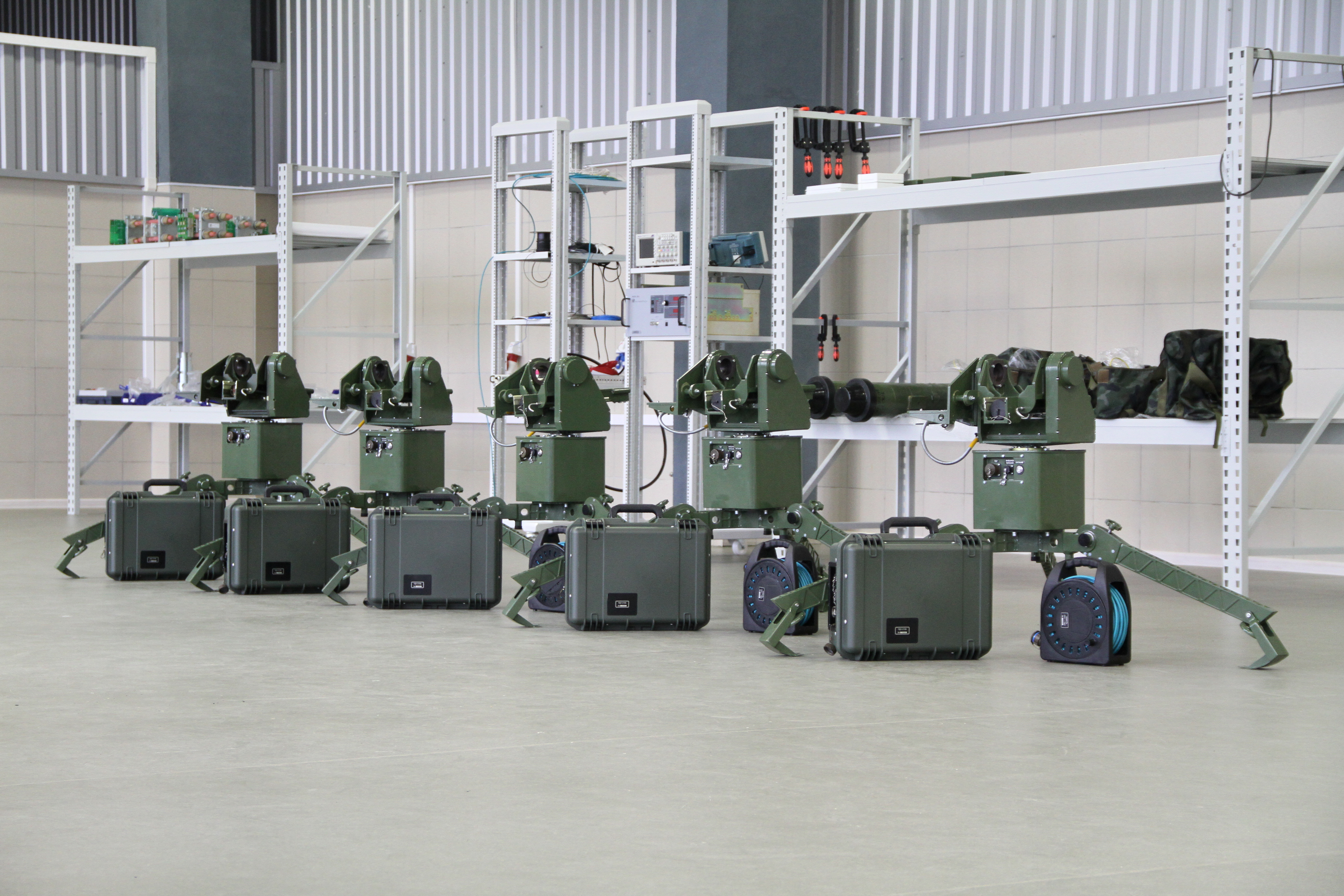
ATGM "Shershen" production site

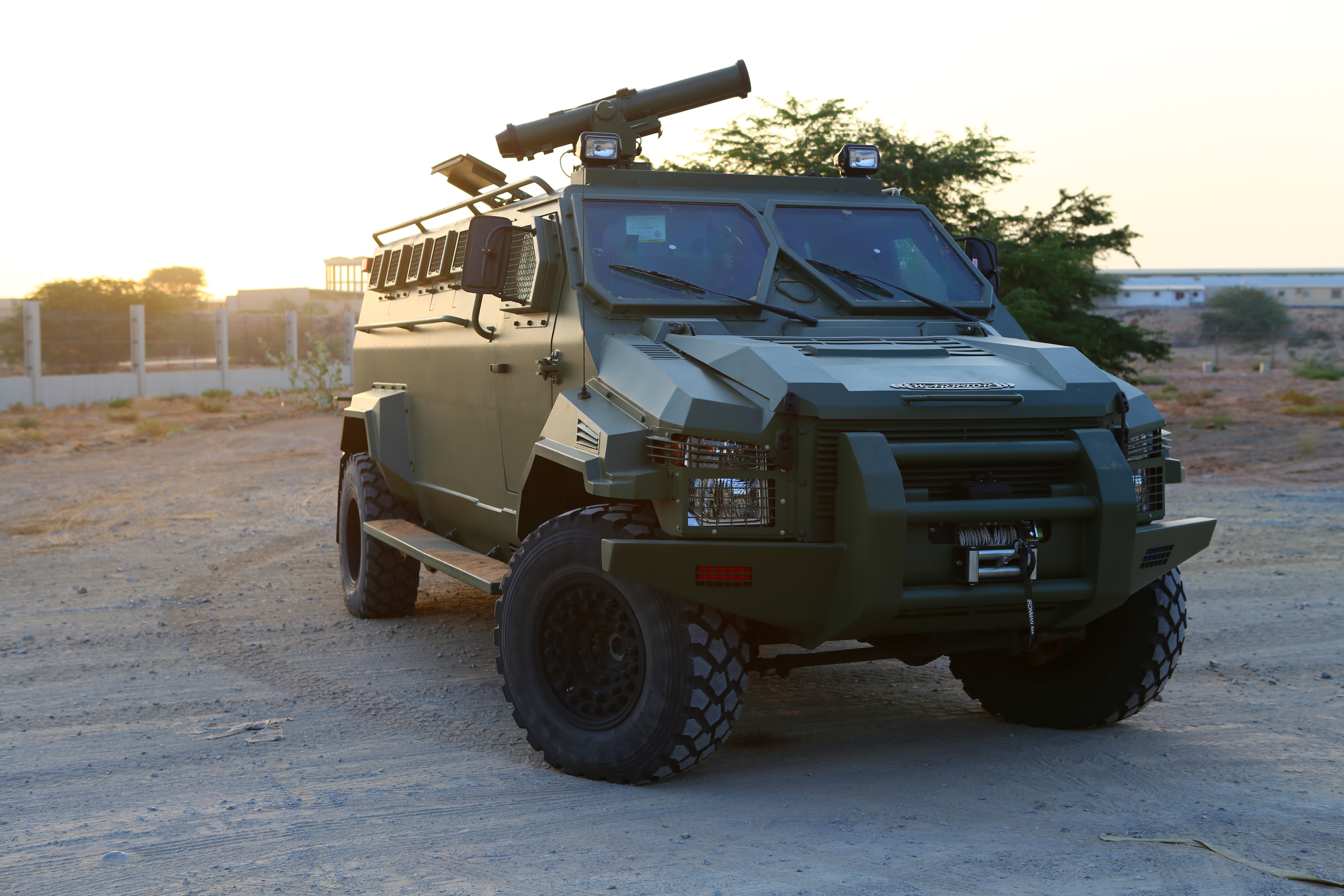
ATGM "Shershen-DM" on Streit Group Spartan APC

== See also ==
- OMTAS – (Turkey)
- FGM-148 Javelin – (United States)
- Type 01 LMAT – (Japan)
- 9M133 Kornet – (Russia)
- BGM-71 TOW – (United States)
- 9K115-2 Metis-M – (Russia)
- NLAW – (Sweden, United Kingdom)
- Stugna-P – (Ukraine)
