= Volnoye =

Volnoye (Russian: Боровинка) is the name of several rural localities in Russia:

- Volnoye, Arkharinsky District, Amur Oblast, a selo in Arkharinsky District, Amur Oblast
- Volnoye, Astrakhan Oblast, a selo in Kharabalinsky District, Astrakhan Oblast
