= Ashuluk =

Ashuluk Ашулук
- Settlement
- Interactive map of Ashuluk
- Location within Astrakhan Oblast Location within Russia
- Coordinates: 47°19′N 47°24′E
- Country: Russia
- Region: Astrakhan Oblast
- District: Kharabalinsky District
- Time zone: UTC+4:00

Ashuluk (Russian: Ашулук) is a rural locality (a settlement) near the Caspian Sea in Tambovsky Selsoviet, Kharabalinsky District, Astrakhan Oblast, Russia. The population was 1,678 as of 2010. There are 3 streets.

== Geography ==
Ashuluk is located 18 km southeast of Kharabali (the district's administrative centre) by road. Tambovka is the nearest rural locality.

The Armed Forces of the Russian Federation has a training ground in the vicinity of Ashuluk.
