= Seitovka =

Seitovka Сеитовка
- Selo
- Location within Astrakhan Oblast Location within Russia
- Coordinates: 46°43′N 48°03′E
- Country: Russia
- Region: Astrakhan Oblast
- District: Krasnoyarsky District
- Time zone: UTC+4:00

Seitovka (Russian: Сеитовка) is a rural locality (a selo) and the administrative center of Seitovsky Selsoviet, Krasnoyarsky District, Astrakhan Oblast, Russia. The population was 477 as of 2010. There are 18 streets.

== Geography ==
Seitovka is located 35 km northwest of Krasny Yar (the district's administrative centre) by road. Buzan-Pristan is the nearest rural locality.
