= Wolny =

Wolny (feminine Wolna) is a Polish surname. It is also a Germanized version of the Czech surname Volný. Notable people with the surname include:

- Dariusz Wolny (born 1960), Polish swimmer
- Dariusz Wolny (born 1969), Polish football manager
- Franz Wolny, Austrian footballer
- Jakub Wolny (born 1995), Polish ski jumper
- Ryszard Wolny (born 1969), Polish wrestler

== See also ==
- Wollny
