= Tambovka, Ternovsky District, Voronezh Oblast =

Tambovka Тамбовка
- Selo
- Location within Voronezh Oblast Location within Russia
- Coordinates: 51°41′N 41°06′E
- Country: Russia
- Region: Voronezh Oblast
- District: Ternovsky District
- Time zone: UTC+3:00

Tambovka (Russian: Тамбовка) is a rural locality (a selo) and the administrative center of Tambovskoye Rural Settlement, Ternovsky District, Voronezh Oblast, Russia. The population was 319 as of 2010. There are 8 streets.

== Geography ==
Tambovka is located 43 km west of Ternovka (the district's administrative centre) by road. Alexandrovka is the nearest rural locality.
