= Polonez (multiple rocket launcher) =

Belarusian rocket artillery system

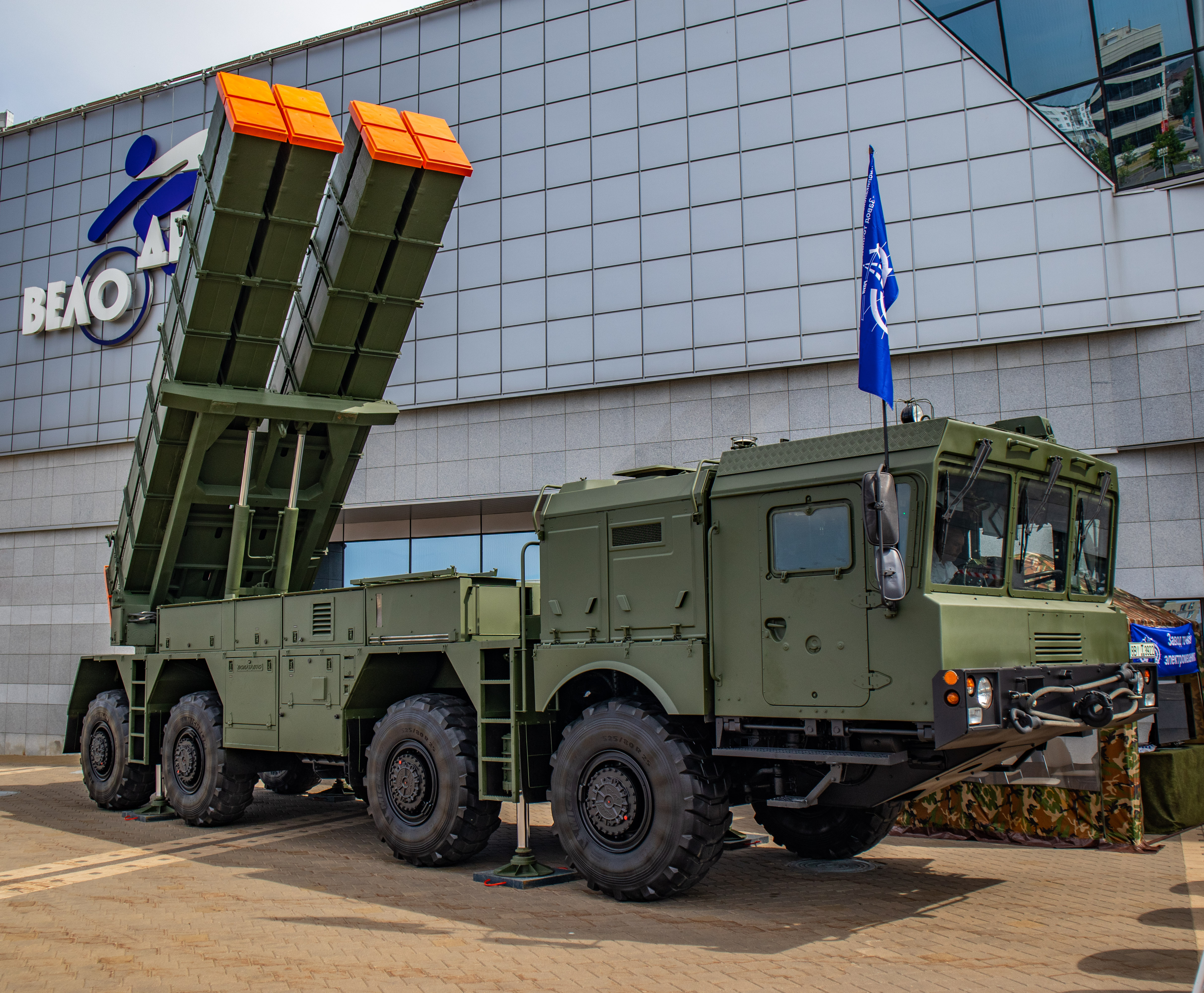
- Polonez
- Type: Multiple rocket launcher
- Place of origin: China; Belarus

Service history
- In service: 2016 – present
- Wars: 2020 Nagorno-Karabakh conflict

Production history
- Designed: 2014
- Produced: 2014 – present

Specifications
- Caliber: 300 mm (12 in)
- Maximum firing range: Polonez: 200 km (120 mi) Polonez-M: 290 km (186.4 mi)
- Guidance system: Global navigation satellite system (GNSS) / inertial navigation system (INS)

The Polonez is a Belarusian 300 mm rocket artillery system of a launcher unit comprising eight rockets packaged in two four-rocket pods mounted on a MZKT-7930 vehicle. In 2018, it was exported to Azerbaijan. The system was designed by the Belarusian Plant of Precision Electromechanics in cooperation with a foreign country, probably China. The first combat missile launches were carried out in China. The 77th Separate Rocket Artillery Battalion of the 336th Rocket Artillery Brigade of the Belarusian Ground Forces is equipped with it. An upgraded version called Polonez-M passed all trials and has been accepted into service by the Belarusian Ground Forces as of May 2019. Polonez-M has an increased range of 290 km (186.4 mi), a higher share of domestic components and can fire the improved A-300 missile. The first delivery was conducted in November 2023.

== See also ==
- Katyusha, BM-13, BM-8, and BM-31 multiple rocket launchers of World War II
- T-122 Sakarya, Turkish 122 mm multiple launch rocket system
- Fajr-5, Iranian 333 mm long-range multiple launch rocket system
- TOROS, Turkish 230 and 260 mm multiple launch rocket system
- BM-14, Soviet 140 mm multiple launch rocket system
- BM-21 Grad, Soviet 122 mm multiple launch rocket system
- BM-27 Uragan, Soviet 220 mm multiple launch rocket system
- M270, U.S. multiple launch rocket system
- Pinaka Multi Barrel Rocket Launcher, Indian 214 mm multiple launch rocket system
- TOS-1 Buratino, Soviet / Russian Heavy Flame Thrower System (multiple rocket / thermobaric weapon launcher)
