= Shershen-L =

The Shershen-L light antitank guided missile system is intended for defeat of stationary and moving modern armored targets with combined, distributed, or solid armor, including ERA, as well as small-sized targets, like pillbox, tank in trench, light armored objects, and helicopters.

With a maximum shooting range of 2.5 km, the Shershen-L, being a lighter variant of the Shershen, compromises some range. On the other hand, this variation is more agile and mobile, which makes it appropriate for certain operational situations when maneuverability and speed are crucial.

Initially, the Shershen-L ATGM system was designed for launching of a missile and aiming to the target without support for launcher (from shoulder of the operator). However, the analysis of Shershen-L firing trials and practice of combat application of similar light ATGM systems discovered, that launchers with support ensure better firing accuracy. That is why the new variant of Shershen-L has been developed in configuration with tripod for launcher plus small-sized control panel for remote control of missile guidance, that guarantees safety of the operator. Shershen-L may be also mounted on different types of mobile platform like light armored vehicles, jeeps, baggies, light vessels, etc.

== Specifications ==
Max firing range	2500 m
Missile flight time to maximum range	12 sec
Warhead	HEAT, HEF, (Thermobaric perspectively)
Armor penetration behind ERA (angle of incidence 60°)	not less than 550 mm
Guidance system	laser beam riding, semi-automatic
Surveillance and target searching system	through TV channel
Weight
– launcher	14.2 kg
– guidance device	5.8 kg
– missile	11.8 kg
– transport-launching container	3.6 kg
– warhead	3.6 kg
Dimensions
– missile caliber	107 mm
– transport-launching container length	1180 mm
– transport-launching container outer diameter	113 mm
Operating temperature range	-30...+60 °C
