= Tambovka, Republic of Bashkortostan =

Tambovka Тамбовка
- Village
- Location within Bashkortostan Location within Russia
- Coordinates: 54°22′N 55°05′E
- Country: Russia
- Region: Bashkortostan
- District: Davlekanovsky District
- Time zone: UTC+5:00

Tambovka (Russian: Тамбовка) is a rural locality (a village) in Polyakovsky Selsoviet, Davlekanovsky District, Bashkortostan, Russia. The population was 17 as of 2010. There is 1 street.

== Geography ==
Tambovka is located 24 km north of Davlekanovo (the district's administrative centre) by road. Gribovka is the nearest rural locality.
