= Volnoye, Arkharinsky District, Amur Oblast =

Volnoye Вольное
- Village
- Location within Amur Oblast Location within Russia
- Coordinates: 49°16′N 129°54′E
- Country: Russia
- Region: Amur Oblast
- District: Arkharinsky District
- Time zone: UTC+9:00

Volnoye (Russian: Вольное) is a rural locality (a selo) and the administrative center of Volnensky Selsoviet of Arkharinsky District, Amur Oblast, Russia. The population was 84 in 2018. There are 5 streets.

== Geography ==
The village is located on the right bank of the Arkhara River, 28 km southwest of Arkhara (the district's administrative centre) by road. Leninskoye is the nearest rural locality.
