= MTs-116M =

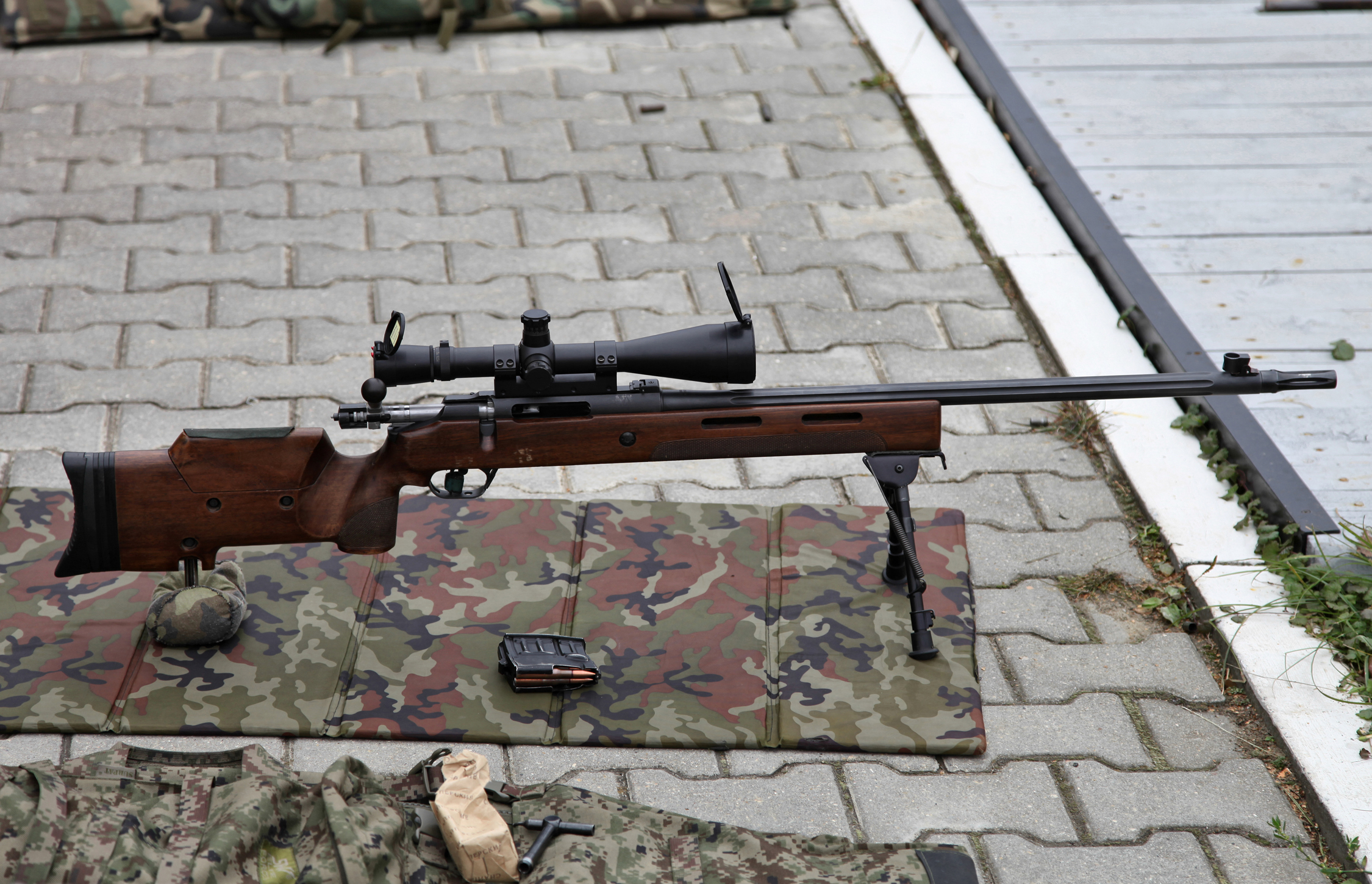
- Type: Sniper rifle
- Place of origin: Russia

Service history
- In service: 1990s
- Used by: See Users
- Wars: Syrian Civil War

Production history
- Designed: 1990s
- Manufacturer: Russia - TsKIB SOO
- Produced: 1997–present

Specifications
- Mass: 7.62×54mmR: 6.5 kg (14.3 lb)
- Length: 308: 1,230 mm (48.4 in); 338: 1,270 mm (50.0 in)
- Barrel length: 7.62×54mmR: 650 mm (25.6 in); 338: 698.5 mm (27.5 in)
- Cartridge: 7.62×54mmR
- Caliber: Various
- Action: Bolt-action
- Effective firing range: 7.62×54mmR: 1,300 m (1,422 yd)
- Maximum firing range: over 2,000 m (2,187 yd)
- Feed system: 5-10 round detachable box magazine
- Sights: PSO-1, PKS-O7U, POSP 8x42

The MTs-116M is a Russian bolt-action sniper rifle. The weapon system was developed By the Central Design Bureau for Sporting and Hunting Arms (TsKIB SOO) based in Tula. Based on a successful single-shot sporting match rifle, it was developed to serve as a modern precision rifle for law enforcement use. The need for such a rifle arose following the realization that the standard military sniper rifle, the Dragunov SVD, did not meet the required qualifications.

== Design ==
The MTs-116M is a manually operated, bolt-action precision sniper rifle. It is chambered for the 7.62×54mmR cartridge of either standard or nonstandard specialized issue, held in 5- to 10-round detachable box magazines. The Marksmanship rifle features include an adjustable folding bipod, a free-floated barrel, flash hider, fully adjustable trigger, adjustable butt plate, cheek rest and a rear support monopod. The rifle is normally fitted with telescope or IR / night sight using proprietary quick-detachable mounts.

Modernized versions of the rifle are equipped with a Picatinny rail for additional attachments. A new version unveiled in 2018 in Russia is chambered in 12.7mm and is designed to be heavily suppressed. This is achieved through the use of a specially developed "noiseless" round that utilizes piston acceleration of the bullet forward while trapping the gases inside the spent cartridge, preventing their release. Noise of the weapon is thus heavily diminished. The new rifle is silently effective to 300 meters (985 feet), and at that distance the special subsonic bullet will go through even body armor.

== Users ==
- Belarus – Special Operations Forces
- Russia – Law Enforcement Agencies
- Syria – Used by Syrian Republican Guard
