= Mayachnoye, Ikryaninsky District, Astrakhan Oblast =

Mayachnoye Маячное
- Selo
- Location within Astrakhan Oblast Location within Russia
- Coordinates: 46°01′N 47°43′E
- Country: Russia
- Region: Astrakhan Oblast
- District: Ikryaninsky District
- Time zone: UTC+4:00

Mayachnoye (Russian: Маячное) is a rural locality (a selo) and the administrative center of Mayachninsky Selsoviet in Ikryaninsky District, Astrakhan Oblast, Russia. The population was 845 as of 2010. There are 10 streets.

== Geography ==
Mayachnoye is located 10 km south of Ikryanoye (the district's administrative centre) by road. Dolgy is the nearest rural locality.
