= Kharabali =

Town in Astrakhan Oblast, Russia

Kharabali Харабали
- Town
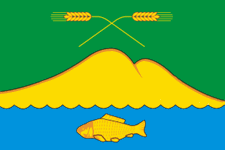
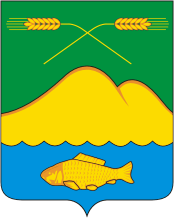
- Flag Coat of arms
- Interactive map of Kharabali
- Location of Kharabali Kharabali (Astrakhan Oblast)
- Coordinates: 47°24′18″N 47°15′20″E
- Country: Russia
- Federal subject: Astrakhan Oblast
- Administrative district: Kharabalinsky District
- Town of district significanceSelsoviet: Kharabali
- Founded: 1789
- Town status since: 1974
- Elevation: 0 m (0 ft)

Population (2010 Census)
  - Total: 18,117
  - Estimate (2021): 18,514 (+2.2%)

Administrative status
  - Capital of: Kharabalinsky District, town of district significance of Kharabali

Municipal status
  - Municipal district: Kharabalinsky Municipal District
  - Urban settlement: Kharabali Urban Settlement
  - Capital of: Kharabalinsky Municipal District, Kharabali Urban Settlement
- Time zone: UTC+4 (MSK+1)
- Postal code: 416010
- OKTMO ID: 12645101001
- Website: mo.astrobl.ru/harabali/

Kharabali (Russian: Харабали́; Kazakh: Қарабайлы, Qarabaıly) is a town and the administrative center of Kharabalinsky District in Astrakhan Oblast, Russia, located on the left bank of the Akhtuba River (an arm of the Volga) 142 kilometers (88 mi) northwest of Astrakhan, the administrative center of the oblast. Population: 18,117 (2010 census); 18,296 (2002 census); 18,566 (1989 Soviet census).

== History ==
It was founded in 1789 as a selo of Kharabalinskoye (Харабалинское) and was later renamed Kharabali. Town status was granted to it in 1974.

== Administrative and municipal status ==
Within the framework of administrative divisions, Kharabali serves as the administrative center of Kharabalinsky District. As an administrative division, it is, together with two rural localities, incorporated within Kharabalinsky District as the town of district significance of Kharabali. As a municipal division, the town of district significance of Kharabali is incorporated within Kharabalinsky Municipal District as Kharabali Urban Settlement.
