= Kharabalinsky District =

Kharabalinsky District Харабалинский район (Russian)
- District
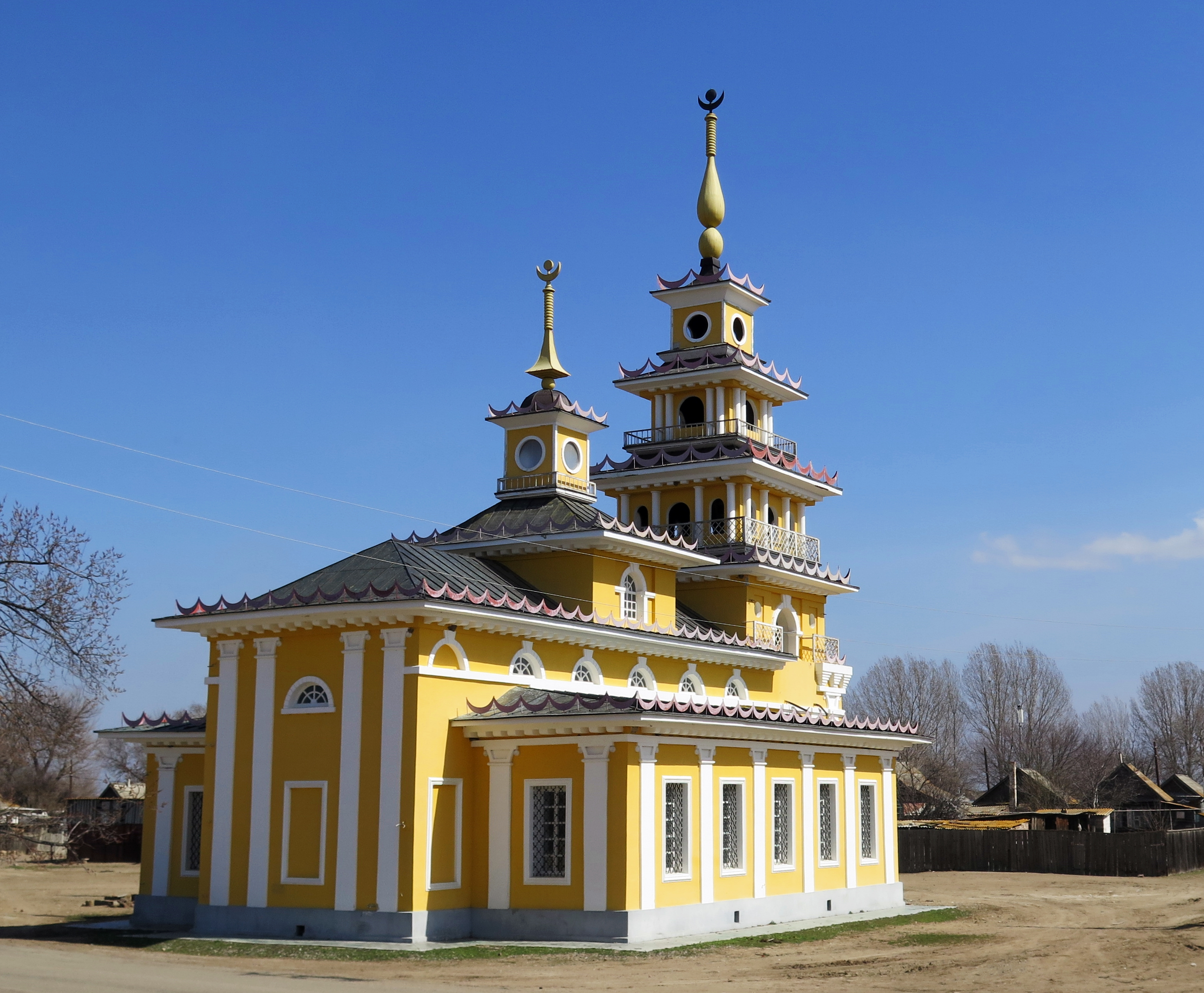
- Khosheutovsky khurul, in Kharabalinsky District

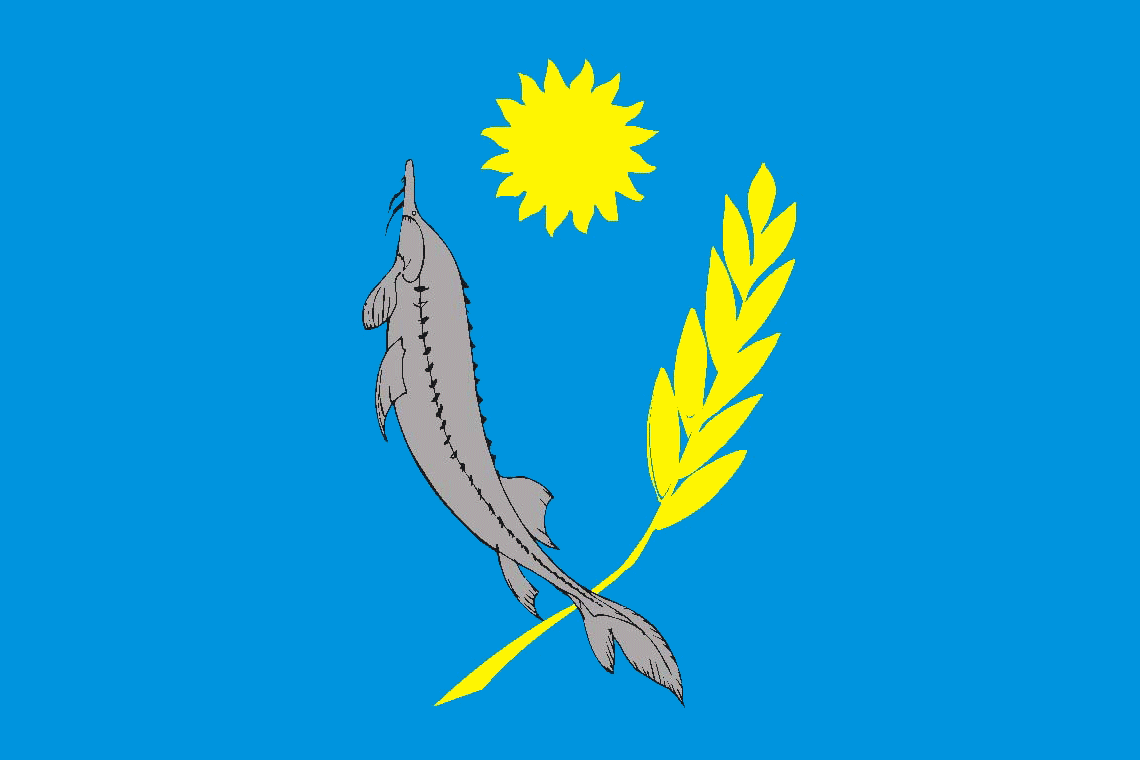
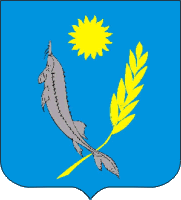
- Flag Coat of arms
- Location of Kharabalinsky District in Astrakhan Oblast
- Coordinates: 47°24′N 47°15′E
- Country: Russia
- Federal subject: Astrakhan Oblast
- Established: 1925
- Administrative center: Kharabali

Area
  - Total: 7,100 km^{2} (2,700 sq mi)

Population (2010 Census)
  - Total: 41,176
  - Density: 5.8/km^{2} (15/sq mi)
  - Urban: 44.0%
  - Rural: 56.0%

Administrative structure
  - Administrative divisions: 1 Towns of district significance, 9 Selsoviets
  - Inhabited localities: 1 cities/towns, 19 rural localities

Municipal structure
  - Municipally incorporated as: Kharabalinsky Municipal District
  - Municipal divisions: 1 urban settlements, 9 rural settlements
- Time zone: UTC+4 (MSK+1)
- OKTMO ID: 12645000
- Website: http://www.harabaly.ru/

Kharabalinsky District (Russian: Харабали́нский райо́н; Kazakh: Қарабайлы ауданы, Qarabaıly aýdany) is an administrative and municipal district (raion), one of the eleven in Astrakhan Oblast, Russia. It is located in the central and eastern parts of the oblast. The area of the district is 7,100 square kilometers (2,700 sq mi). Its administrative center is the town of Kharabali. Population: 41,176 (2010 census); 40,955 (2002 Census); 42,273 (1989 Soviet census). The population of Kharabali accounts for 44.0% of the district's total population.

Ethnic Russians make up 51% of the district's population. The second largest ethnic group is the Kazakhs that account for 42% of the population. Smaller minority communities include Nogais, Tatars and Armenians.
