= Krasny Yar, Astrakhan Oblast =

Rural locality in Russia

Coordinates: 46°32′04″N 48°20′35″E

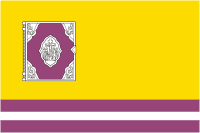
Flag of Krasny Yar

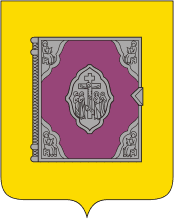
Coat of arms of Krasny Yar

Krasny Yar (Russian: Кра́сный Яр; Kazakh: Қызылжар, Qyzyljar) is a rural locality (a selo) and the administrative center of Krasnoyarsky District of Astrakhan Oblast, Russia.

== Demographics ==
Population: 11,824 (2010 Census); 10,926 (2002 Census); 10,875 (1989 Soviet census).
