= Krasnoyarsky District, Astrakhan Oblast =

Krasnoyarsky District Красноярский район (Russian)
- District
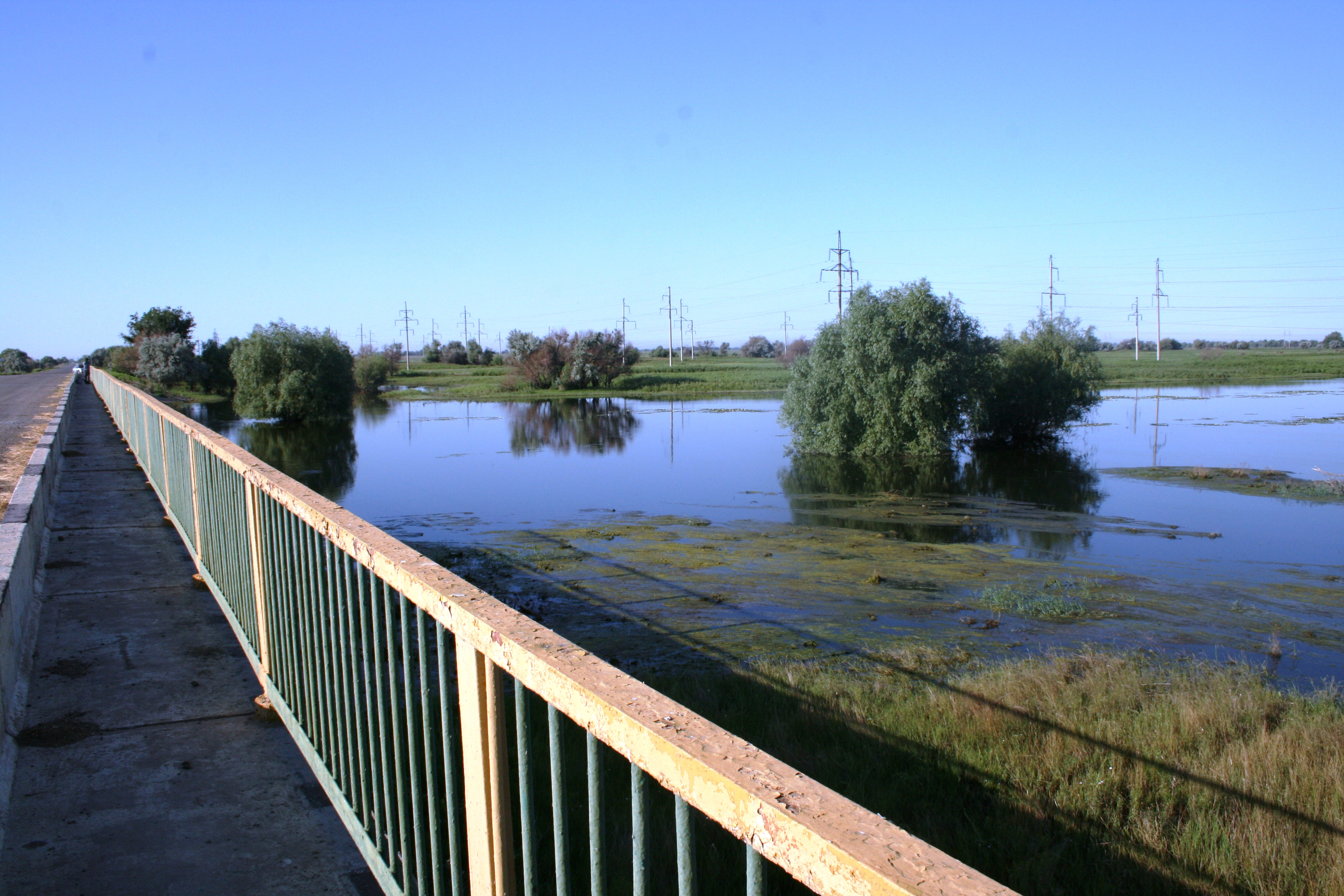
- Wetlands in Krasnoyarsky District

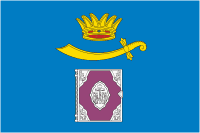
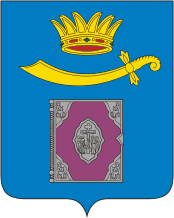
- Flag Coat of arms
- Location of Krasnoyarsky District in Astrakhan Oblast
- Coordinates: 46°32′N 48°21′E
- Country: Russia
- Federal subject: Astrakhan Oblast
- Established: July 1925
- Administrative center: Krasny Yar

Area
  - Total: 5,260.48 km^{2} (2,031.08 sq mi)

Population (2010 Census)
  - Total: 35,615
  - Density: 6.7703/km^{2} (17.535/sq mi)
  - Urban: 0%
  - Rural: 100%

Administrative structure
  - Administrative divisions: 9 Selsoviets
  - Inhabited localities: 51 rural localities

Municipal structure
  - Municipally incorporated as: Krasnoyarsky Municipal District
  - Municipal divisions: 0 urban settlements, 9 rural settlements
- Time zone: UTC+4 (MSK+1)
- OKTMO ID: 12630000
- Website: http://www.krasniyar.ru

Population of Krasnoyarsky District
- 2010 Census: 35,615
- 2002 Census: 38,534
- 1989 Census: 45,547
- 1979 Census: 27,645

Krasnoyarsky District (Russian: Красноя́рский райо́н; Kazakh: Қызылжар ауданы, Qyzyljar audany) is an administrative and municipal district (raion), one of the eleven in Astrakhan Oblast, Russia. It is located in the southeast of the oblast. The area of the district is 5,260.48 square kilometers (2,031.08 sq mi). Its administrative center is the rural locality (a selo) of Krasny Yar. As of the 2010 Census, the total population of the district was 35,615, with the population of Krasny Yar accounting for 33.2% of that number.

== History ==
The district was established in July 1925.
