= Timeline of the Mongol Empire =

Expansion of the Mongol Empire

This is the timeline of the Mongol Empire from the birth of Temüjin, later Genghis Khan, to the ascension of Kublai Khan as emperor of the Yuan dynasty in 1271, though the title of Khagan continued to be used by the Yuan rulers into the Northern Yuan dynasty, a far less powerful successor entity, until 1634.

== 12th century ==
=== 1160s ===
Year	Date	Event
1162		Temüjin is born in Delüün Boldog near Burkhan Khaldun to the Mongol chieftain Yesugei and Hoelun

=== 1170s ===
Year	Date	Event
1171		Yesugei takes Temüjin east through Tatar territory to the Khongirad homeland to arrange a future marriage between his son and Börte. Temüjin stays with the Khongirads to learn their ways, however Yesugei is poisoned by the Tatars during his return trip. Temüjin leaves Börte for his father, but arrives too late to see his father alive. His father's followers scatter and Hoelun is left to care for their children by herself. She takes them to the Khentii Mountains, where they live for several years.
1173		Temüjin becomes anda, blood brothers, with Jamukha of the Jajirad (Jadaran) clan
1177		Temüjin leaves to claim Börte. Börte's father gives him a black sable cloak as dowry, which he later gives to Toghrul of the Keraites to gain his favor. Soon after the Merkits abduct Börte and Temüjin flees.
1178		Temüjin assembles an allied force of over 20,000 with his ally Toghrul and sworn blood brother Jamukha, who attack the Merkits and rescue Börte.

=== 1180s ===
Year	Date	Event
1185		Mongols gather at Burkhan Khaldun to throw their support behind Temüjin in fear of the rising power of Jamukha
1187		Temüjin allies himself with the Khongirad to wage war on the Tatars.

=== 1190s ===
Year	Date	Event
1191		Temüjin, Jamukha, and Toghrul attack the Merkits.
1192		Jin dynasty starts constructing fortifications in the northwest to prevent depredations by the Mongols
1193		Jamukha refuses to acknowledge Temüjin's leadership and wages war on him.
1194		Jamukha and Temüjin clash at the Dalan Baljut, which ends inconclusively. However Jamukha's rash and vindictive behavior towards his allies alienates him.
1196		Jin and Mongol troops carry out a punitive expedition against the Tatars

== 13th century ==
=== 1200s ===
Year	Date	Event
1201		Mongols opposing Temüjin promote Jamukha to gür-khan
1202		Mongols exterminate the Tatars
1203		Temüjin splits with Toghrul
1203	spring	The Keraites defeat Temüjin at Qalaqaljid Sands
1203	autumn	Temüjin defeats Toghrul at Jeje'er Heights
1203		Temüjin creates the Kheshig, an elite military guard
1204		Temüjin defeats the Naimans, Merkits, and Jamukha; Merkit leaders and Jamukha flee to the Altai Mountains
1204	fall	Temüjin pursues Jamukha and defeats him in several battles. Eventually Jamukha's allies betray him and turn him over to Temüjin, who kills him by breaking his back.
1204		The Uyghurs and Ongud submit to Temüjin
1205	spring	Mongol conquest of Western Xia: Temüjin of the Mongols raids Western Xia's border settlements
1206	spring	Kokochu, also known as Teb Tengri, chief shaman of the Mongols, bestows upon Temüjin the title of Genghis Khan, "Universal Ruler" of the Mongol Empire, at the kurultai of Burkhan Khaldun, sacred mountain of the Mongols
1207		Mongol conquest of Western Xia: Genghis Khan sacks Wulahai, a Western Xia garrison along the Yellow River near modern Wuyuan
1207		Jochi subjugates the 'forest peoples' - Kyrgyz, Oirat, and Buryat
1208		Toq'toa Beki of the Merkits is killed by Mongols and Uyghurs
1209	autumn	Mongol conquest of Western Xia: Genghis Khan penetrates Western Xia from Wulahai and defeats a Tangut army before laying siege to Zhongxing, however the Mongols accidentally flood their own camp in the process of breaking the Yellow River dikes and are forced to retreat
1209		Qocho, Qayaligh, and Almaliq submit to Genghis Khan; Almaliq and the Issyk-Kul region given to Chagatai

=== 1210s ===
Year	Date	Event
1210		Mongol conquest of Western Xia: Emperor Xiangzong of Western Xia submits to the Mongol Empire and hands over a daughter in marriage to Genghis Khan as well as a large supply of camels, falcons, and woven textiles; a Mongol garrison is left at Wulahai
1210		Kokochu is killed by Qasar in a wrestling match
1211		Mongol conquest of the Jin dynasty: Jochi, Ögedei, and Chagatai invade Inner Mongolia
1211	October	Mongol conquest of the Jin dynasty: Jebe takes Juyong Pass from the Jin dynasty
1211	winter	Mongol conquest of the Jin dynasty: Mongol forces retreat from Jin territory
1211		Karluks rebel against the Qara Khitai and defect to the Mongol Empire
1212	February	Battle of Yehuling: Genghis Khan and Muqali crush the Jin army led by Wanyan Jiujin, Duji Sizhong, and Hushahu
1213	5 January	Mongol conquest of the Jin dynasty: Jebe takes the Eastern Capital
1213	July–August	Mongol conquest of the Jin dynasty: Genghis Khan crushes a Jin army led by Zhuhu Gaoqi
1213	autumn	Mongol conquest of the Jin dynasty: Jochi, Ögedei, and Chagatai ravage Hebei and Shanxi
1213	November	Mongol conquest of the Jin dynasty: Genghis Khan and Jebe pass through the Zijing Gap
1214	31 March	Mongol conquest of the Jin dynasty: Genghis Khan lays siege to the Central Capital
1214	11 May	Mongol conquest of the Jin dynasty: Jin dynasty becomes a tributary and agrees to hand over a daughter of the previous emperor; the Mongols lift the siege
1214	July	Mongol conquest of the Jin dynasty: Khitan and Tatar defectors lay siege to the Central Capital
1214	December	Mongol conquest of the Jin dynasty: Muqali wipes out Jin centers in Liaoning and southern Manchuria
1215	31 May	Battle of Zhongdu: Mongol Empire takes the Central Capital and places the Khitan Shimo Ming'an and Jabar Khoja in charge of the city
1215	23 September	Kublai is born to Tolui and Sorghaghtani Beki
1216		Mongol conquest of the Qara Khitai: Jebe seizes Kashgar from the Qara Khitai and Kuchlug flees
1216		Subutai raids the Kipchaks
1217		Mongol conquest of the Jin dynasty: Genghis Khan appoints Muqali as viceroy of North China and leaves for Mongolia
1217		Mongol conquest of the Jin dynasty: Muqali removes Jin presence in the steppes
1218	autumn	Mongol conquest of Khwarezmia: Muhammad II of Khwarezm's forces clash with a Mongol army led by Jochi and Subutai, the battle ending inconclusively
1218	winter	Mongol conquest of Khwarezmia: A Muslim merchant delegation sent by Genghis Khan arrives at Otrar and the governor Inalchuq kills them, seizing their goods for himself; a sole survivor reaches Mongolia and alerts Genghis, who sends three more envoys to demand custody of Inalchuq - they are also killed
1218		Mongol conquest of Western Xia: Mongol Empire lays siege to Zhongxing and Emperor Xiangzong of Western Xia flees west; his son and officials make peace with the Mongols
1218		Mongol conquest of the Qara Khitai: Shepherds in Badakhshan capture Kuchlug and hand him over to Jebe, who beheads him; so ends the Qara Khitai
1219	January	Goryeo becomes a tributary of the Mongol Empire
1219	fall	Mongol conquest of Khwarezmia: Ögedei and Chagatai take Otrar and massacres its population; Genghis Khan dispatches Jochi to conquer Syr Darya and another army to conquer Fergana
1219		Western Xia refuses to send auxiliaries for the Mongol Empire's western campaigns

=== 1220s ===
Year	Date	Event
1220	15 February	Mongol conquest of Khwarezmia: Genghis Khan takes Bukhara and places Yelü Ahai in control of Transoxiana
1220	16 March	Mongol conquest of Khwarezmia: Genghis Khan takes Samarkand and Muhammad II of Khwarezm flees to Nishapur; Genghis Khan dispatches Jebe and Subutai to destroy the sultan
1220	May	Mongol conquest of Khwarezmia: Jebe and Subutai take Balkh and capture Muhammad II of Khwarezm's mother Terken Khatun and family in the Zagros Mountains
1220	winter	Mongol conquest of Khwarezmia: Muhammad II of Khwarezm dies
1221	March	Mongol conquest of Khwarezmia: Tolui destroys Merv
1221	April	Mongol conquest of Khwarezmia: Jochi, Chagatai, and Ögedei destroy Urgench while Tolui takes Nishapur and Herat
1221	spring	Battle of Parwan: Jalal al-Din Mangburni defeats a Mongol army led by Shigi Qutuqu in the Hindu Kush
1221		Mongol conquest of Khwarezmia: Genghis Khan takes Termez
1221		Siege of Bamyan: Genghis Khan takes Bamyan; Chagatai's son Mutukan dies in the process
1221	November	Battle of Indus: Genghis Khan defeats Jalal al-Din Mangburni, who swims across the Indus River and escapes
1222		Subutai and Jebe conquer the Kuban steppe and crush the Cumans
1222	September	Battle of Khunan: Subutai and Jebe defeat the Kingdom of Georgia in battle and mortally injure their king George IV of Georgia on their way north of the Caucasus.
1223		Mongol conquest of the Jin dynasty: Muqali dies and the Mongol Empire loses control of Henan, central Shaanxi, and southeast Shandong
1223	spring	Genghis Khan returns to Mongolia
1223	31 May	Battle of the Kalka River: Subutai and Jebe defeat the forces of Mstislav Mstislavich, Mstislav III of Kiev, Daniel of Galicia, Mstislav II Svyatoslavich, and Köten before sacking Novhorod-Siverskyi and heading back to Mongolia
1223		Mongol Empire sacks Sudak
1224		Battle of Samara Bend: Bulgars ambush Subutai and Jebe near Saqsin
1224		Goryeo stops paying tribute
1226	February	Mongol conquest of Western Xia: Mongol Empire seizes Khara-Khoto from Western Xia and sack cities across the Gansu Corridor
1226	November	Mongol conquest of Western Xia: Mongol Empire sacks Lingzhou
1226	4 December	Mongol conquest of Western Xia: Genghis Khan crosses the Yellow River and defeats a Tangut relief column
1227	September	Mongol conquest of Western Xia: Emperor Mozhu of Western Xia surrenders to the Mongol Empire and is promptly executed; so ends the Western Xia
1227		Jochi dies and is succeeded by his son Batu Khan
1227	August	Genghis Khan dies near the Jing River and Tolui becomes regent
1229	13 September	Ögedei Khan is elected ruler of the Mongol Empire at a kurultai near the Kherlen River
1229		Mongol invasion of Volga Bulgaria: Sunitay and Kukedey attack Bulgar outposts on the Ural River

=== 1230s ===
Year	Date	Event
1230		Mongol conquest of the Jin dynasty: Doqolqu and Subutai attack Tong Pass and are defeated by Wanyan Heda
1230	autumn	Mongol conquest of the Jin dynasty: Ögedei Khan and Tolui take Fengxiang
1231	August	Mongol conquest of Khwarezmia: Chormaqan defeats Jalal al-Din Mangburni, who escapes only to be killed by some random Kurd; so ends the Khwarazmian dynasty
1231		Mongol invasions of Korea: Sartai subjugates Goryeo, however the Mongol overseers are immediately killed afterwards
1231		"Thunder crash bombs" are employed by Jin troops in destroying a Mongol warship.
1232	spring	Mongol conquest of the Jin dynasty: Tolui invades Henan and Ögedei Khan pushes through the Tong Pass
1232	13 February	Mongol conquest of the Jin dynasty: Tolui kills Wanyan Heda
1232	8 April	Siege of Kaifeng (1232): Subutai lays siege to Kaifeng
1232		Mongol invasions of Korea: Sartai heads back to Goryeo and dies from an arrow
1232		Mongol invasions of Georgia: Chormaqan subjugates Azerbaijan
1232		Tolui is struck by sickness and dies
1232		Mongol conquest of the Jin dynasty: Reusable fire lance barrels made of durable paper are employed by Jin troops during the Mongol siege of Kaifeng.
1233	5 March	Siege of Kaifeng (1232): Kaifeng surrenders
1233	December	Siege of Caizhou: Mongol Empire lays siege to Caizhou
1234	9 February	Siege of Caizhou: Emperor Aizong of Jin abdicates to a distant relative, Hudun, who becomes Emperor Mo of Jin, and commits suicide; Emperor Mo of Jin is killed by the Mongols; so ends the Jin dynasty
1234		Ögedei Khan announces his plans to conquer Goryeo, the Song dynasty, and Cumania
1235		Ögedei Khan constructs Karakorum
1236		Mongol invasion of Volga Bulgaria: Subutai destroys Bolghar and takes Saqsin
1236		Mongol invasions of Georgia: Chormaqan subjugates Georgia and Armenia
1237	21 December	Siege of Ryazan: Batu, Orda, Güyük, and Möngke sack Ryazan and Suzdal
1237		Large bombs requiring several hundred men to hurl using trebuchets are employed by Mongols in the siege of Anfeng (modern Shouxian, Anhui Province).
1238	4 March	Battle of the Sit River: Mongol Empire kills Yuri II of Vladimir
1238	spring	Siege of Kozelsk: Batu struggles to take Kozelsk for two months before Kadan and Büri take it in three days
1238		Mongol Empire conquers Crimea
1239	3 March	Mongol invasion of Rus': Mongol Empire sacks Pereiaslav
1239	18 October	Mongol invasion of Rus': Mongol Empire sacks Chernihiv

=== 1240s ===
Year	Date	Event
1240	6 December	Siege of Kiev (1240): Mongol Empire sacks Kiev, Halych, and Vladimir-Suzdal, so ends Kievan Rus
1240		Mongol invasions of Tibet: Doorda Darkhan sacks Reting Monastery
1241	9 April	Battle of Legnica: Orda defeats the combined force of Henry II the Pious, Mieszko II the Fat, Sulisław of Cracow, and Boleslaus Děpoltic
1241	11 April	Battle of Mohi: Boroldai and Subutai defeat a combined army from the Kingdom of Hungary, Croatia, and Knights Templar
1241	December	Mongol invasion of Europe: Kadan crosses the Danube
1241	11 December	Ögedei Khan dies on a hunting trip after lengthy drinking and his wife Töregene Khatun becomes regent
1241		Siege of Lahore (1241): A Mongol force led by Tair Bahadur sacks the city of Lahore, marking a major incursion into the Delhi Sultanate.
1242		Mongol invasion of Europe: Mongol Empire forces Bulgaria to pay tribute
1242	Spring	Mongol invasion of Europe: Mongol forces retreat after receiving news of Ögedei Khan's death; Batu Khan stays at the Volga River and his brother Orda Khan returns to Mongolia
1242		Mongol invasions of Anatolia: Mongols take Erzurum
1242		Chagatai Khan dies and his grandson Qara Hülegü succeeds him
1243	26 June	Battle of Köse Dağ: Baiju defeats Kaykhusraw II and subjugates the Sultanate of Rum and Empire of Trebizond
1244		The Ayyubid dynasty gives tribute to the Mongols
1244		Badr al-Din Lu'lu' of Mosul submits to the Mongol Empire
1246		Temüge tries to seize the throne without a kurultai but fails
1246	24 August	Güyük Khan is elected ruler of the Mongol Empire at a kurultai on the Kherlen River
1246		Güyük Khan appoints Yesü Möngke as head of the Chagatai Khanate
1248	20 April	Güyük Khan dies on his way to confront Batu Khan and his wife Oghul Qaimish becomes regent

=== 1250s ===
Year	Date	Event
1251	1 July	Möngke Khan is elected ruler of the Mongol Empire at a kurultai in the Khentii Mountains
1251	fall	Möngke Khan places his brothers Hulagu Khan and Kublai Khan in charge of West Asia and China, respectively
1251		Möngke Khan appoints Qara Hülegü as head of the Chagatai Khanate, who dies soon after, and his wife Orghana becomes regent for her young son Mubarak Shah
1252	summer	Möngke Khan places Kublai Khan in charge of the invasion of the Dali Kingdom and Hulagu Khan the invasion of the Middle East
1252	fall	Mongol forces depart from Shanxi and reach the Tao River
1252		Mongol conquest of the Song dynasty: Mongol forces under the Chinese general Wang Dechen advance into Sichuan and occupy Lizhou
1252		Kublai Khan advances with the main force towards the Dali Kingdom
1252		Niccolò and Maffeo Polo set off from Venice for China
1252		Mongol invasions of Tibet: Qoridai invades Tibet as far as Dangquka
1253		Kublai Khan's forces set up headquarters on the Jinsha River in western Yunnan and march on Dali in three columns
1253	September	Mongol conquest of the Song dynasty: Mongol forces occupy Lizhou
1253		Kublai Khan meets Phagpa Lama and promotes the Sakya school of Tibetan Buddhism
1254	January	The Dali Kingdom is conquered, although its dynasty remains in power, and the king, Duan Xingzhi, is later invested with the title of Maharajah by Möngke Khan; so ends the Dali Kingdom
1254	winter	Kublai Khan returns to Mongolia and leaves Subutai's son Uryankhadai in charge of campaigns against local Yi tribes
1254		Kublai Khan starts building an independent power base in Henan and Jingzhao where Chinese-style government is implemented
1254		Mongol conquest of the Song dynasty: Mongol raids on the northern Song border intensify
1254		Mongol invasions of Korea: Jalairtai Qorchi plunders Goryeo
1255		Mongol invasions of Korea: Mongol Empire takes Sinuiju and attacks coastal islands
1255		Batu Khan dies and is succeeded by his son Sartaq Khan, who dies soon after, and then Ulaghchi
1256	summer	Mongol conquest of the Song dynasty: Möngke Khan declares war on the Song dynasty, citing imprisonment of Mongol envoys as casus belli
1256	20 November	Mongol campaign against the Nizaris: Hulagu Khan takes Alamut
1256		Mongols defeat Kaykaus II at Aksaray and enthrone Kilij Arslan IV
1256		Daniel of Galicia expels Mongol garrisons from his territory
1256		Kublai Khan constructs a capital north of the Luan River
1257		Uriyangkhadai, son of Subutai, pacifies Yunnan and returns to Gansu
1257	winter	Mongol invasions of Vietnam: Uriyangkhadai returns to Yunnan and invades the kingdom of Đại Việt (ruled by the Trần dynasty)
1257		Möngke Khan launches an investigation into Kublai Khan's activities and subjects officials in Henan and Shanxi to interrogation, executes Kublai's chief pacification officer in Shanxi, and imposes large levies on Shanxi
1257		Ulaghchi dies and Berke, a Muslim, succeeds him
1258	17 January	Siege of Baghdad (1258): Hulagu Khan sends a Mongol contingent across the Tigris River which suffers a defeat against Aybak
1258	18 January	Siege of Baghdad (1258): Baiju floods the enemy camp and attacks, driving them back
1258	29 January	Siege of Baghdad (1258): Hulagu Khan lays siege to Baghdad
1258	1 February	Siege of Baghdad (1258): Mongol siege weapons breach Baghdad's Ajami tower
1258	3 February	Siege of Baghdad (1258): Mongol forces take Baghdad's walls
1258	10 February	Siege of Baghdad (1258): Al-Musta'sim, his sons, and 3,000 dignitaries surrender
1258	13 February	Siege of Baghdad (1258): Mongols sack Baghdad and Hulagu Khan takes the title of Ilkhan, meaning "obedient khan"
1258	20 February	Siege of Baghdad (1258): Al-Musta'sim and his family are executed, so ends the Abbasid Caliphate
1258		Kublai Khan returns to Mongolia to placate his brother
1258	spring	Mongol conquest of the Song dynasty: Möngke Khan's forces reach Gansu
1258	spring	Mongol invasions of Vietnam: Đại Việt recognizes Mongol suzerainty and king Trần Thái Tông sends his son as hostage to the imperial court
1258	March	Mongol conquest of the Song dynasty: Mongols capture Chengdu
1258	March	Buqa Temür takes Wasit
1258	fall	Mongol conquest of the Song dynasty: Möngke Khan's forces reach Lizhou
1258		Mongol invasions of Korea: Wonjong of Goryeo goes to the Mongol court as hostage
1259	January	Mongol conquest of the Song dynasty: Möngke Khan's forces take Yazhou
1259	February	Siege of Diaoyu Castle: Möngke Khan's forces lay siege to Diaoyu Fortress
1259	July	Siege of Diaoyu Castle: Möngke Khan calls off the siege of Diaoyu Fortress
1259	August	Mongol conquest of the Song dynasty: Taghachar attacks Huainan
1259	12 August	Mongol conquest of the Song dynasty: Möngke Khan dies from dysentery or a wound inflicted by a Song trebuchet, forcing Mongol campaigns throughout Eurasia and China to come to a halt
1259	September	Mongol conquest of the Song dynasty: Kublai Khan's forces cross the Yangtze and lays siege to Ezhou, however he receives news of Möngke Khan's death and Ariq Böke's mobilization, forcing hm to withdraw and deal with his brother
1259		Wonjong of Goryeo goes back to Goryeo to become ruler - henceforth becoming a Mongol tributary
1259		Second Mongol invasion of Poland: Berke and Boroldai invade Poland and Daniel of Galicia flees, however his sons and brother Vasilko of Galicia join the Mongols to plunder Lithuania and Polish territories
1259		Golden Horde elements in Bukhara rebel and Alghu suppresses them

=== 1260s ===
Year	Date	Event
1260	January	Siege of Aleppo (1260): Hulagu Khan takes Aleppo from An-Nasir Yusuf; so ends the Ayyubid dynasty
1260		The Principality of Antioch submits to the Mongol Empire
1260	2 February	Sack of Sandomierz (1260): Berke and Boroldai sack Sandomierz
1260	5 May	Kublai Khan convenes a kurultai at Kaiping, which elects him as ruler of the Mongol Empire; so ends the centralized Mongol Empire
1260	May	Toluid Civil War: Ariq Böke proclaims himself great khan of the Mongol Empire at Karakorum
1260	6 June	Hulagu Khan receives news of Möngke Khan's death and retreats to Ahlat
1260	26 July	Battle of Ain Jalut: Qutuz of the Mamluks advance into Palestine and drive the Mongols from Gaza
1260	spring	Hulagu Khan's son Yoshmut and commander Elege of the Jalayir take Mayyafaraqin and Mardin
1260	August	Kitbuqa sacks Sidon
1260	3 September	Battle of Ain Jalut: Qutuz of the Mamluks defeats Mongol forces under Kitbuqa and push them back to the Euphrates
1260	10 December	First Battle of Homs: Baibars defeats a Mongol expedition into Syria
1260		Toluid Civil War: Berke of the Golden Horde allies with Ariq Böke and declares war on Hulagu Khan
1260		Toluid Civil War: Alghu, a grandson of Chagatai Khan, deposes Mubarak Shah, an appointee to the Chagatai Khanate of the Mongol Empire
1260		Mongol conquest of the Song dynasty: Kublai Khan's envoy Hao Jing proposes that the Song dynasty acknowledge Kublai as Son of Heaven in return for autonomy and gets jailed
1260		Kublai Khan appoints Drogön Chögyal Phagpa as Imperial Preceptor
1260		Ajall Shams al-Din Omar, from Bukhara, is appointed a commissioner of a district in north China
1260		Kublai Khan issues three currencies but the paper Jiaochao, backed by silver, prevails; total value of paper money amounts to 73,352 silver ingots
1261		Mongol conquest of the Song dynasty: Kublai Khan sends funds to Li Tan of Shandong to make war on the Song dynasty
1261		Franks visit Kublai Khan's court at Shangdu
1261		Badr al-Din Lu'lu' dies and his son Malik Salih kills all the Christians, causing a rebellion in Mosul and Cizre
1262	22 February	Mongol conquest of the Song dynasty: Mongol-allied warlord of Shandong, Li Tan, defects to the Song dynasty
1262	August	Mongol conquest of the Song dynasty: Kublai Khan's Chinese generals Shi Tianze and Shi Chu crush Li Tan's forces and capture him; Li Tan is trampled to death by horses
1262	summer	Rebellions in Mosul and Cizre are suppressed
1262	November	Hulagu Khan kills his vizier Saif-ud-Din Bitigchi and replaces him with Shams al-Din Juvayni
1262		Berke–Hulagu war: Berke of the Golden Horde allies with the Mamluks and invades Azerbaijan
1262		Hulagu Khan gives Khorasan and Mazandaran to his son Abaqa and Azerbaijan to his other son Yoshmut
1262		Kublai Khan prohibits nomads' animals from roaming on farmlands
1262		Kublai Khan appoints Ahmad Fanakati to the Central Secretariat to direct state finances
1263	13 January	Berke–Hulagu war: Berke defeats Hulagu Khan's army on the Terek River
1263		Kublai Khan reestablishes the Privy Council to oversee the Imperial Bodyguards and Kheshig
1264		Toluid Civil War: Kublai Khan defeats Ariq Böke
1264		Kublai Khan founds the Supreme Control Commission to administer Tibet and Buddhists
1264		Mongol invasion of Byzantine Thrace: Berke attacks Thrace and secures the release of Kayqubad II
1265	8 February	Hulagu Khan dies and is succeeded by his son Abaqa Khan
1265		Mongol conquest of the Song dynasty: Song dynasty and Mongol forces clash in Sichuan
1265		Niccolò and Maffeo Polo arrive at Kublai Khan's court
1266	9 July	Kublai Khan appoints his son Nomukhan Beiping Wang (prince of the pacification of the north)
1266		Berke dies in Tbilisi and is succeeded by his grandnephew Mengu-Timur
1266		Alghu dies and is succeeded by Mubarak Shah, who is deposed by Ghiyas-ud-din Baraq
1266		Kublai Khan orders the construction of Daidu, known to the Chinese as Dadu, or Khanbalikh to the Turks
1267		Drikung Kagyu rebels against the Supreme Control Commission and Kublai Khan dispatches forces to crush them
1267		Kublai Khan orders the construction of an Imperial Ancestral Temple
1267		Kublai Khan designates Xu Heng as chancellor of the Guozijian
1267		Mengu-Timur grants Genoa Caffa
1268		Battle of Xiangyang: Mongol forces under Aju lay siege to Xiangyang
1268		The rebellion in Tibet is suppressed and Drogön Chögyal Phagpa is reinstated along with a Mongol pacification commissioner
1268		Kublai Khan creates the "General Administration for the Supervision of Ortogh" (Muslim merchant association) to lend money at low interest to the ortogh
1269		Kaidu–Kublai war: Kaidu, a grandson of Ögedei Khan, rebels against Kublai Khan
1269		Sambyeolcho Rebellion: Im Yeon engineers a coup against Wonjong of Goryeo and Kublai Khan sends 3,000 troops to vanquish the rebels and reinstate Wonjong
1269		Golden Horde assists Vladimir-Suzdal in evicting the Germans from Narva
1269		Drogön Chögyal Phagpa invents the 41 letter 'Phags-pa script, which Kublai Khan designates as the state script
1269		Niccolò and Maffeo Polo return to Europe

=== 1270s ===
Year	Date	Event
1270		Mongol invasions of Tibet: Mongol forces crush the rebellion in Tibet and implement regular administration
1270		Ghiyas-ud-din Baraq of the Chagatai Khanate invades the Ilkhanate but suffers defeat
1270		Kublai Khan founds the Institute of Muslim Astronomy
1271		Ghiyas-ud-din Baraq dies and Kaidu takes control of the Chagatai Khanate, installing Negübei as puppet khan
1271		Kublai Khan declares himself emperor of the Yuan dynasty and for the first time, annual sacrifices at the altars of Soil and Grain are done in the Chinese style; so ends the unified Mongol Empire

== Gallery ==
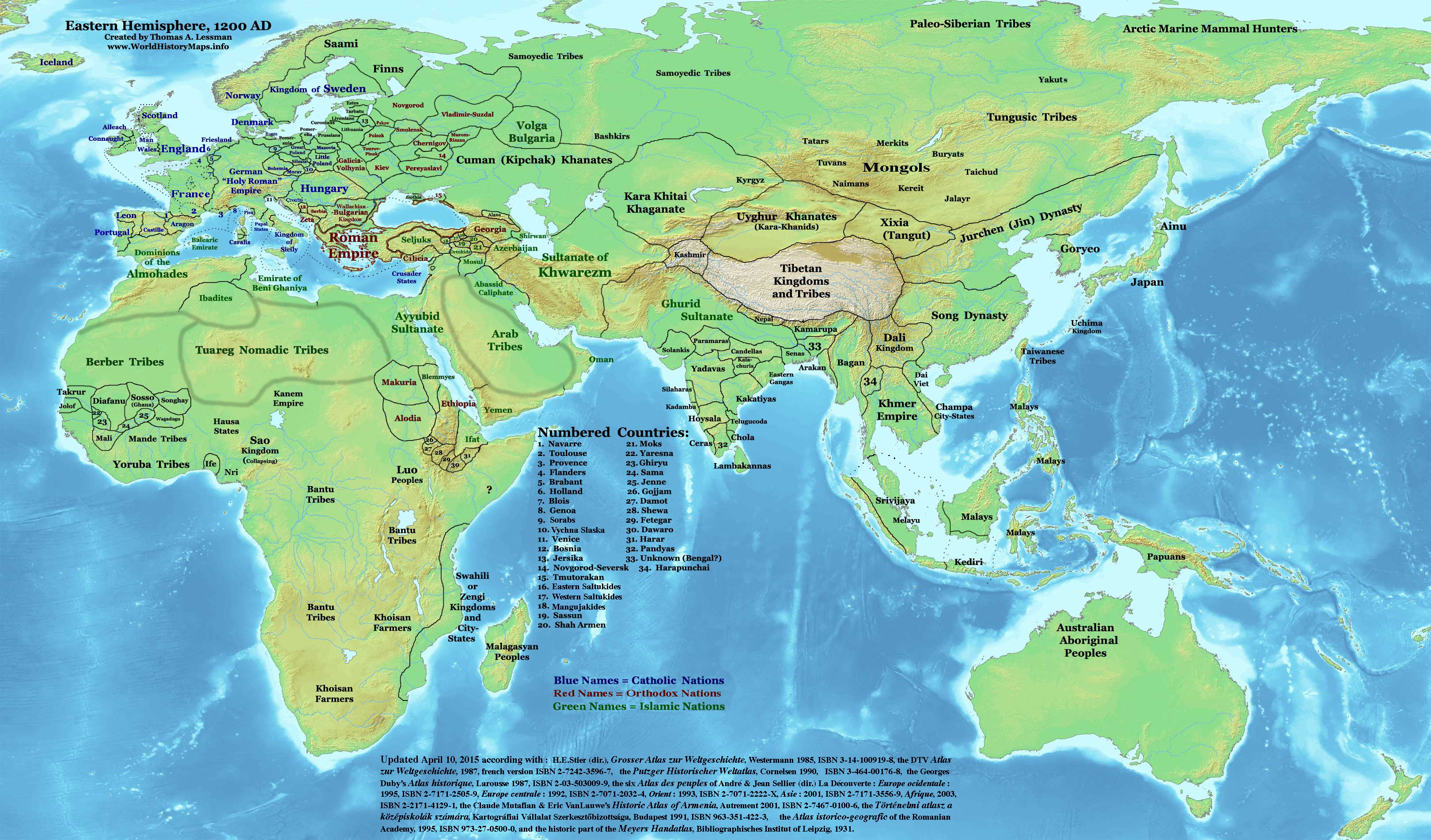
Eurasia on the eve of the Mongol invasions, c. 1200.

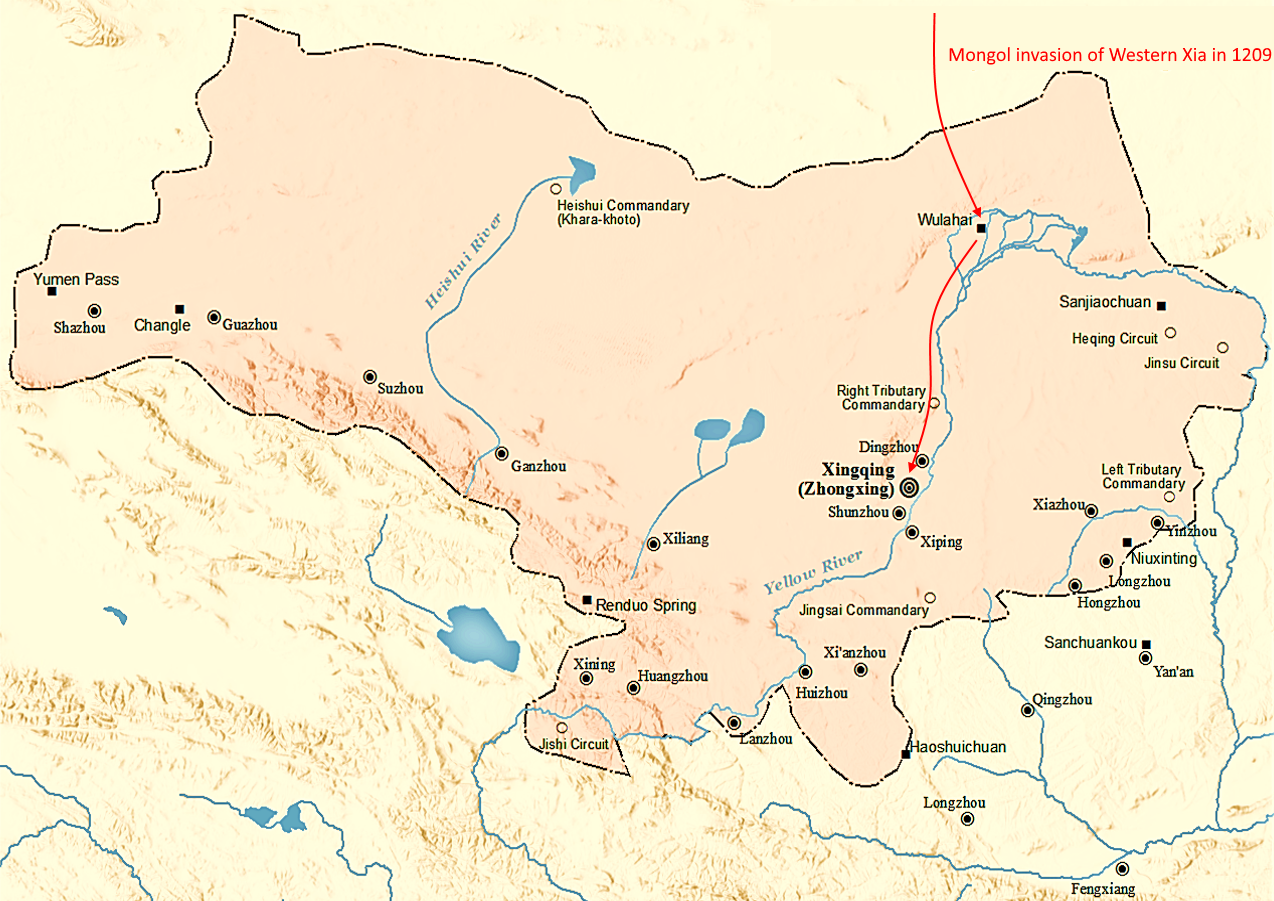
Mongol invasion of Western Xia in 1209

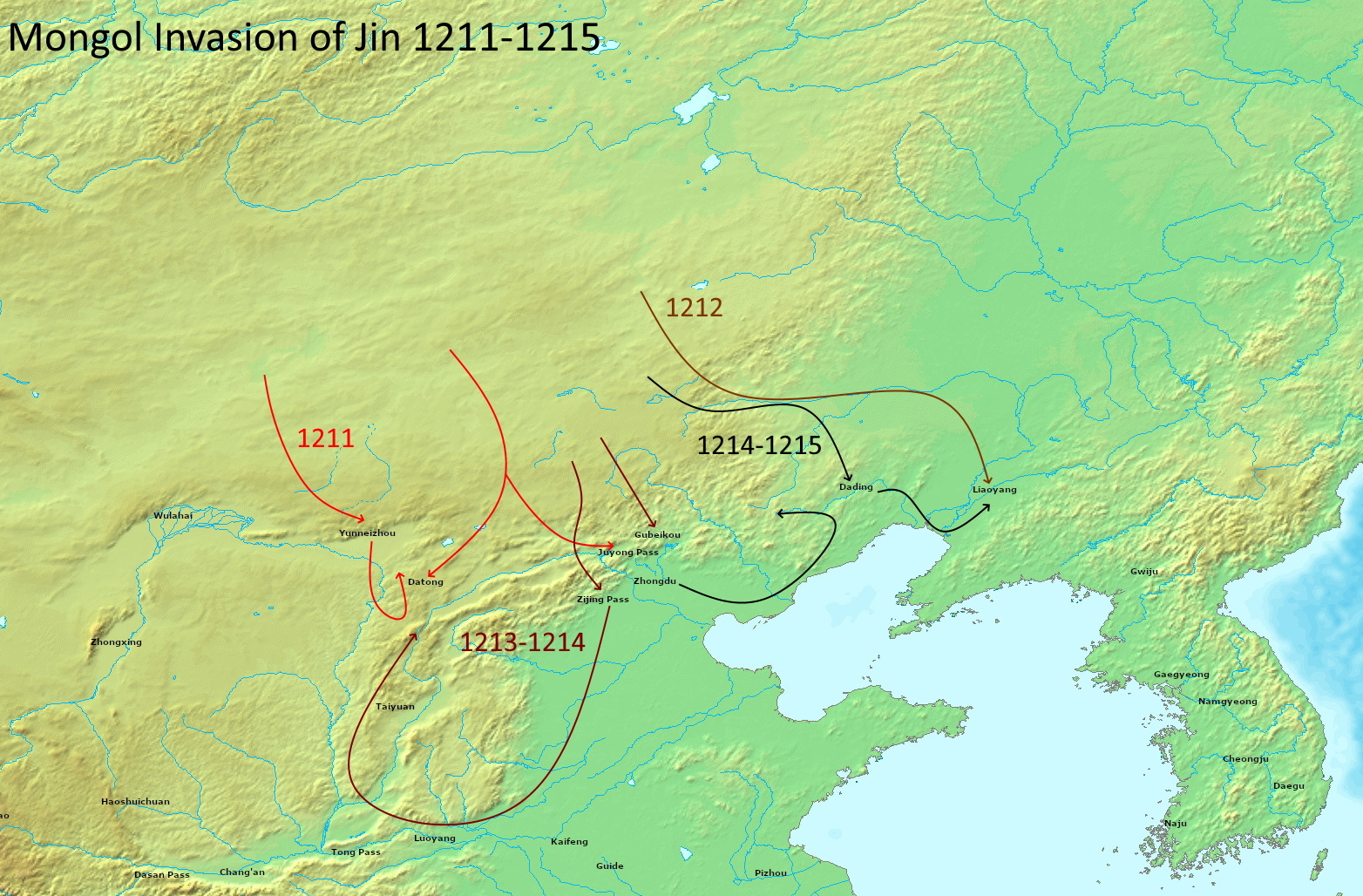
Mongol invasion of the Jin dynasty (1211–1215)

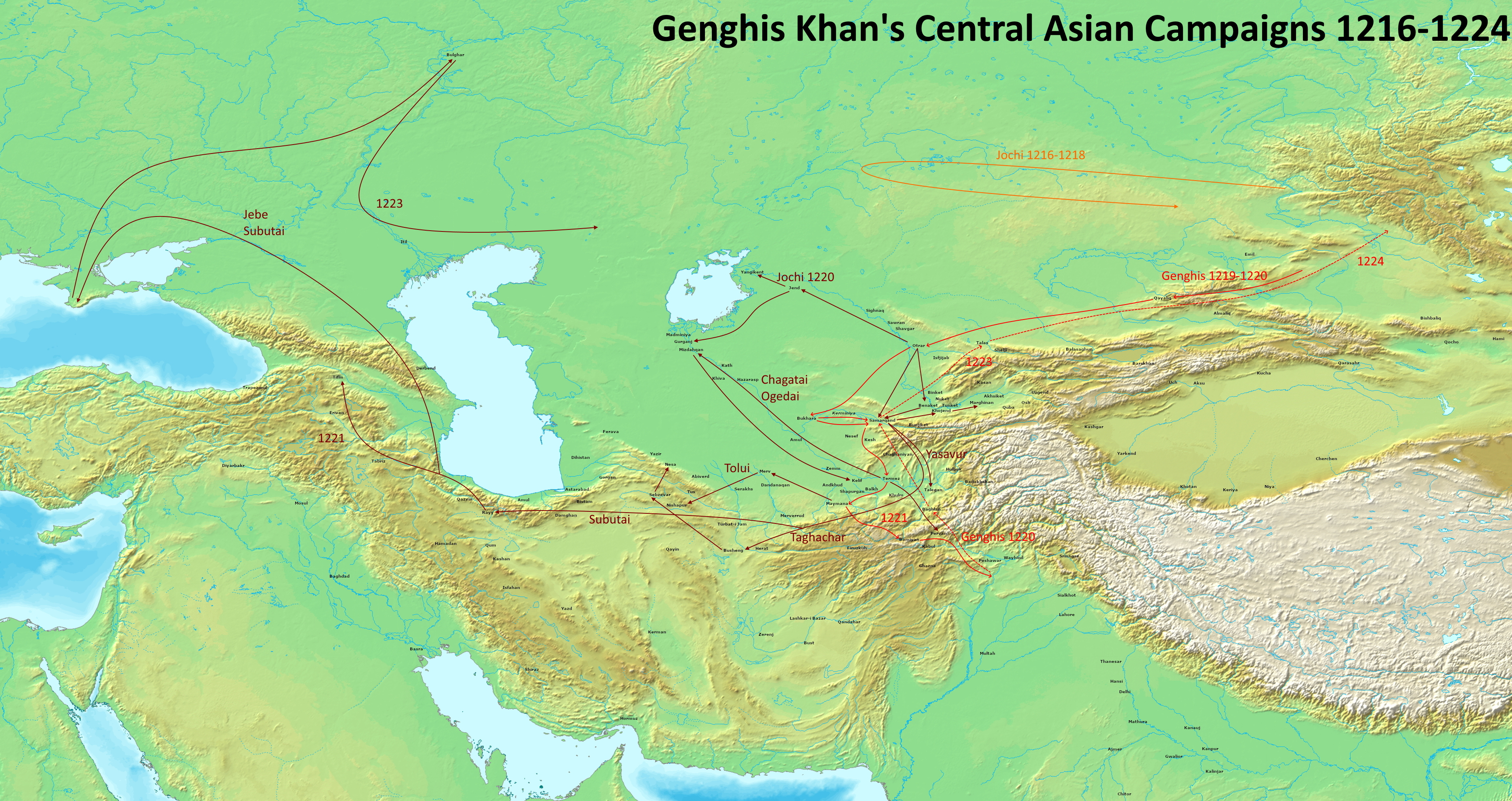
Genghis Khan's Central Asian campaigns (1216-1224)

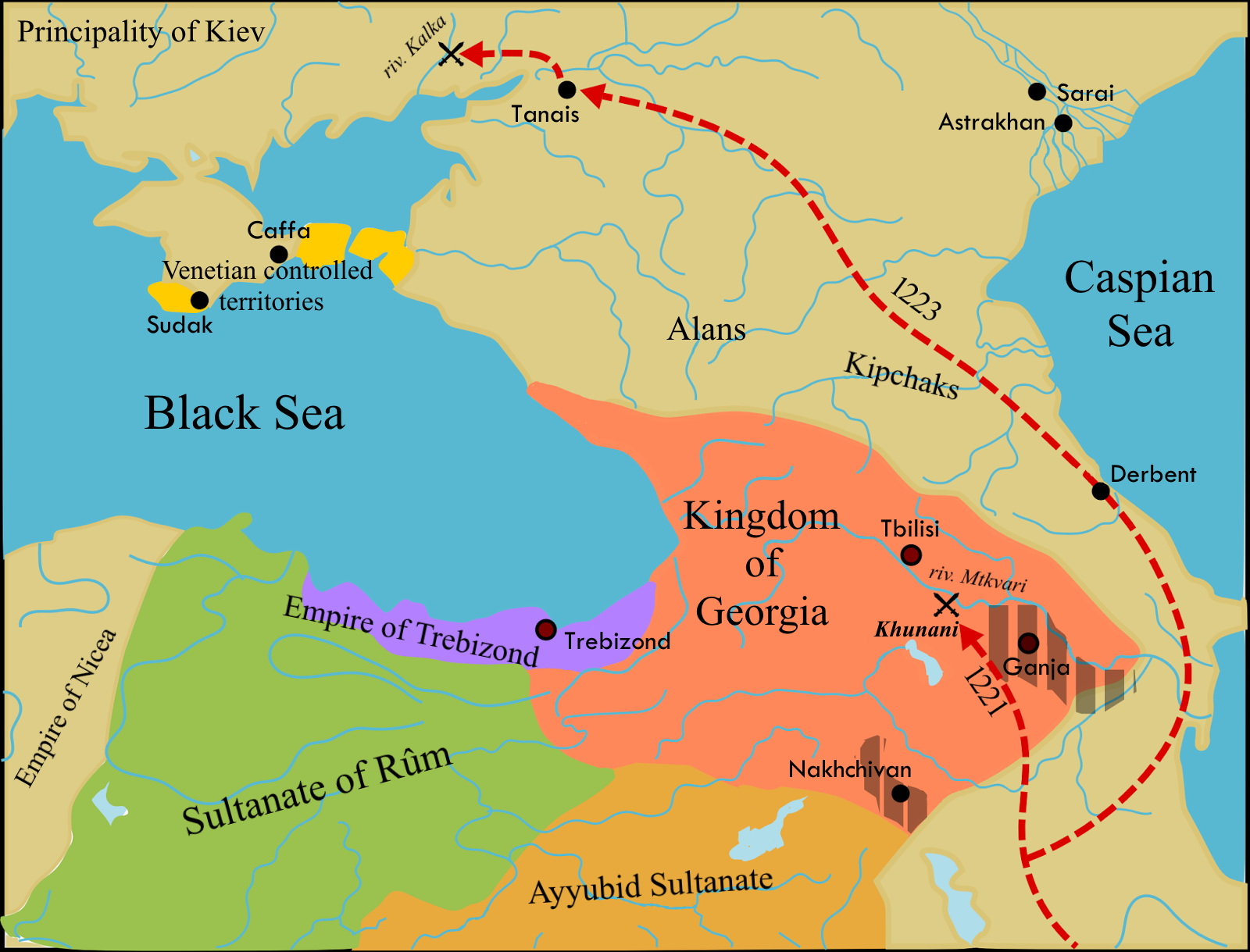
Mongol invasion of Georgia in 1221 and the Battle of the Kalka River in 1223

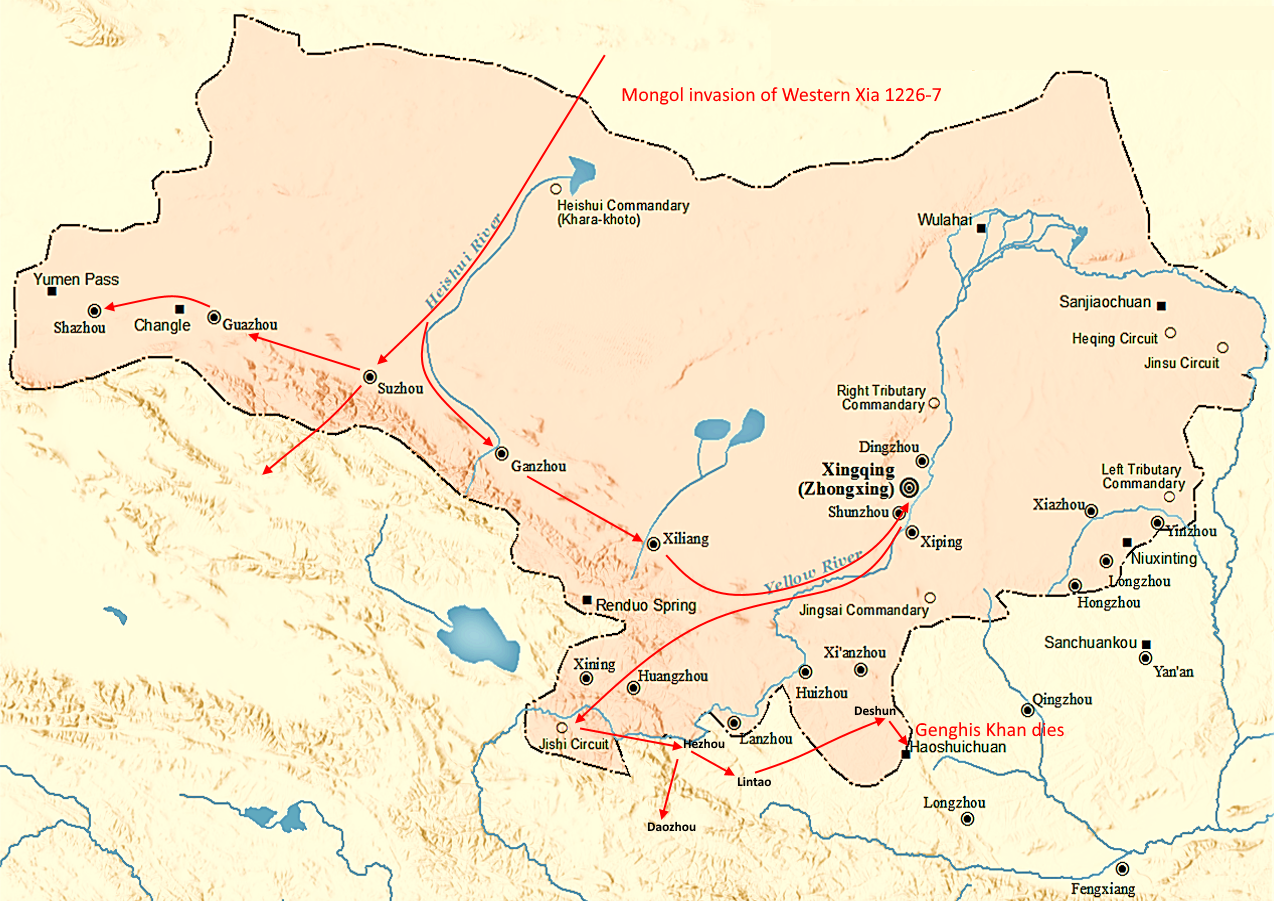
Mongol invasion of Western Xia, 1226-1227

Mongol Empire in 1227 at Genghis' death

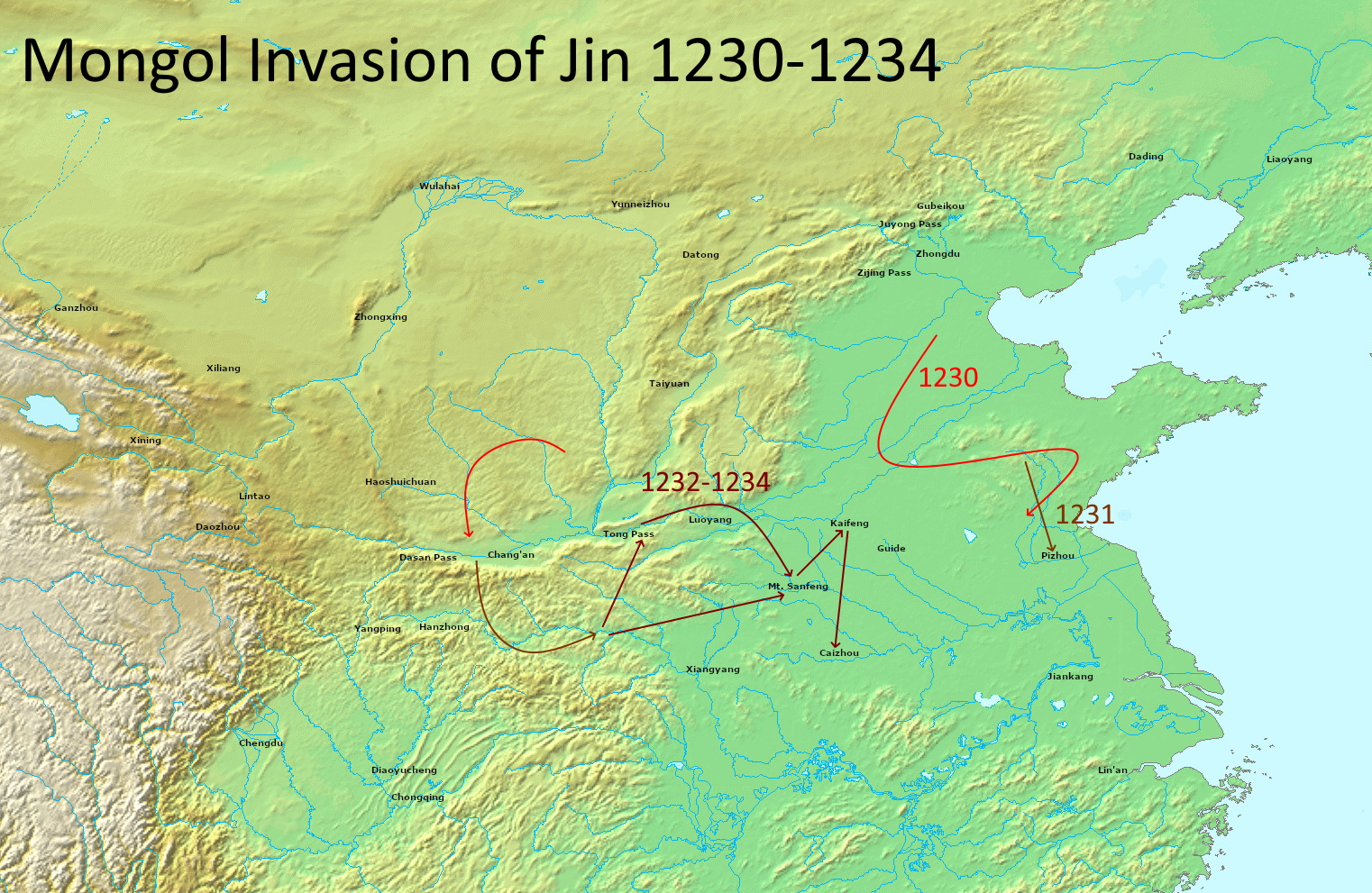
Mongol conquest of the Jin dynasty (1230–1234)

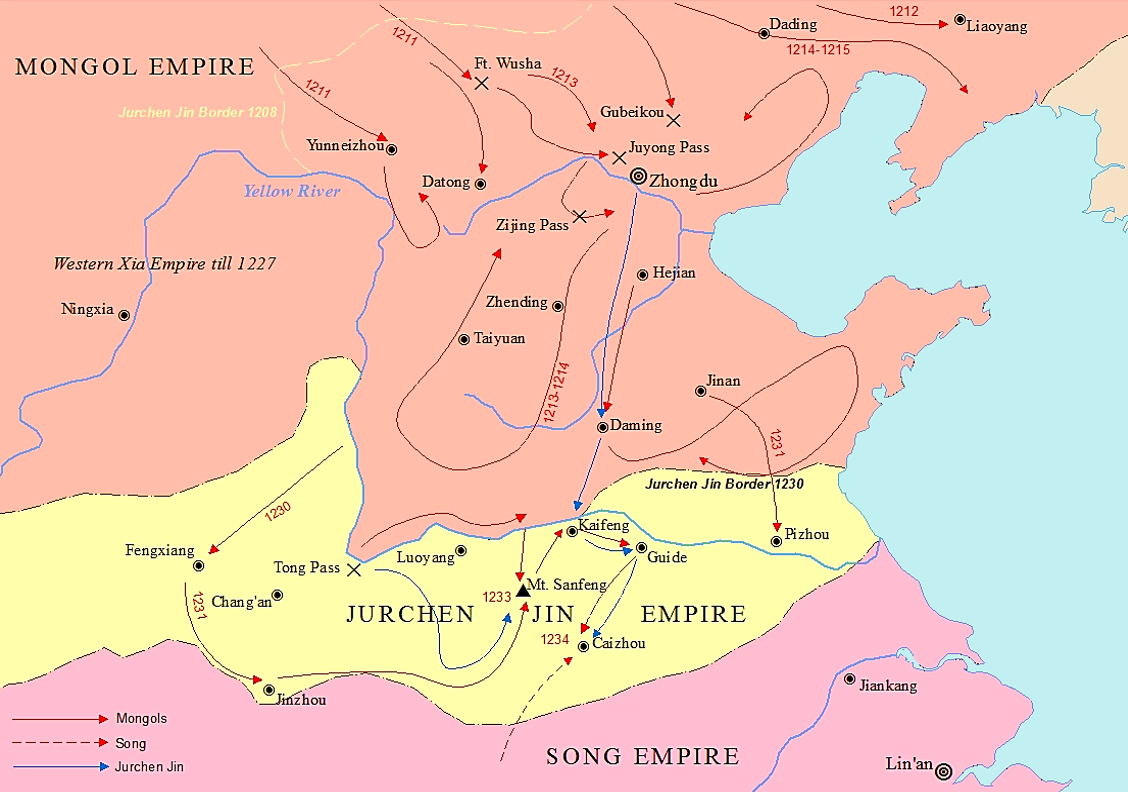
Mongol conquest of the Jin dynasty (1211–1215, 1230–1234)

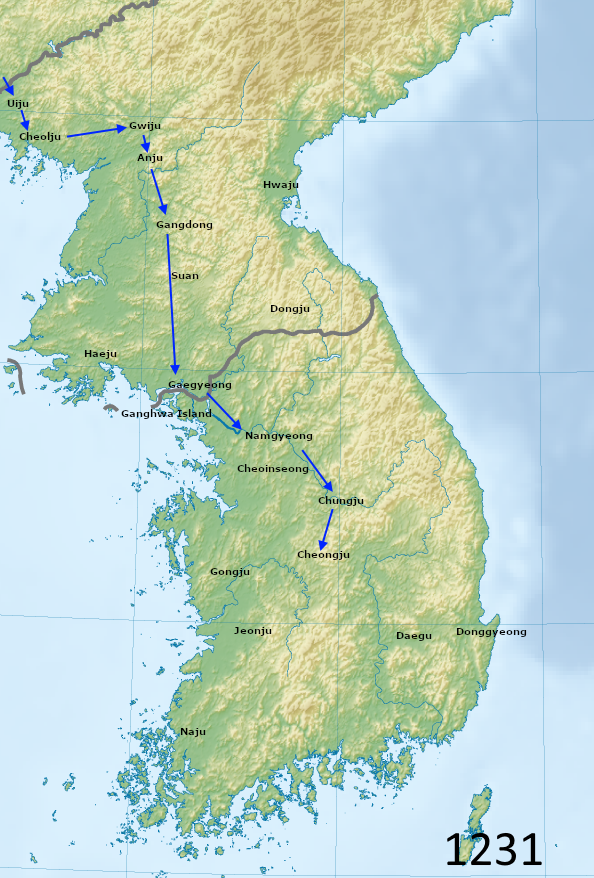
1231 Mongol invasion of Goryeo

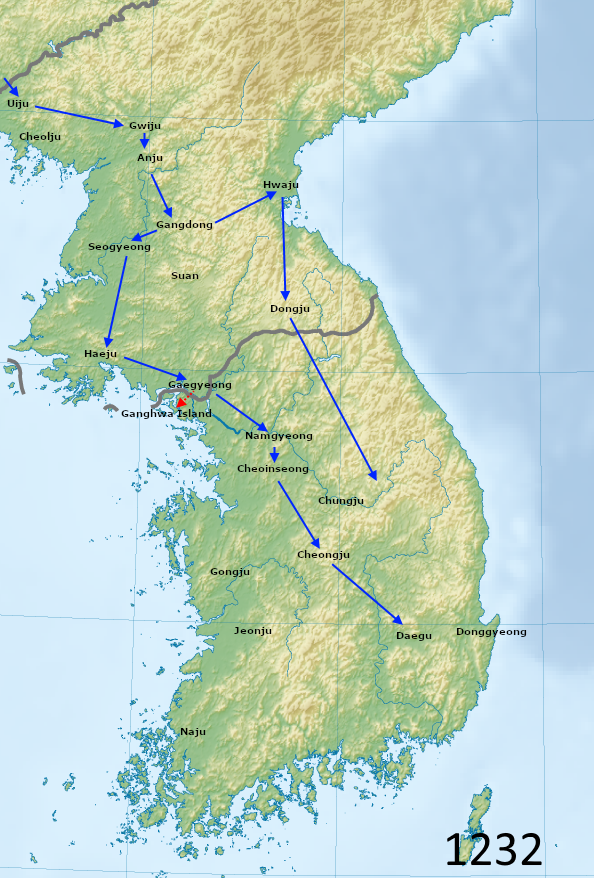
1232 Mongol invasion of Goryeo

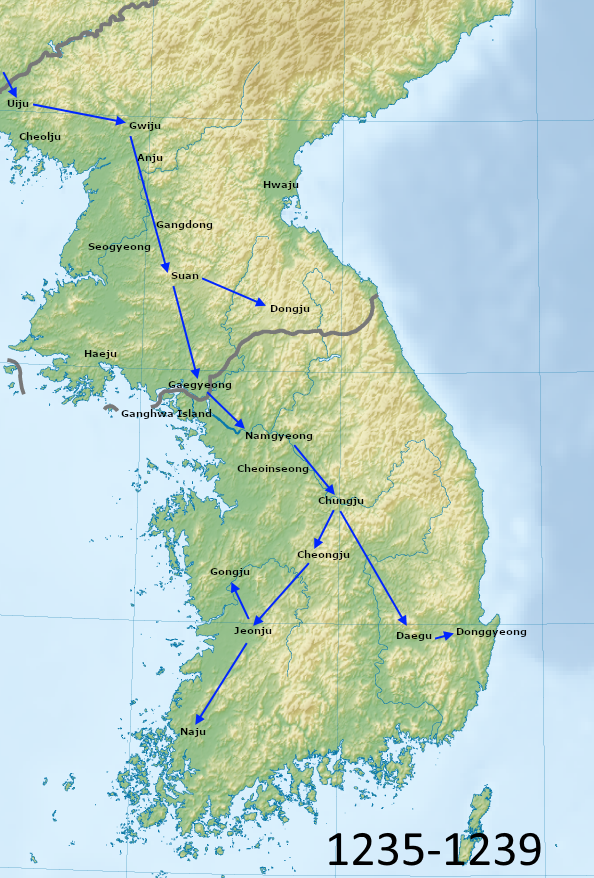
1235 Mongol invasion of Goryeo

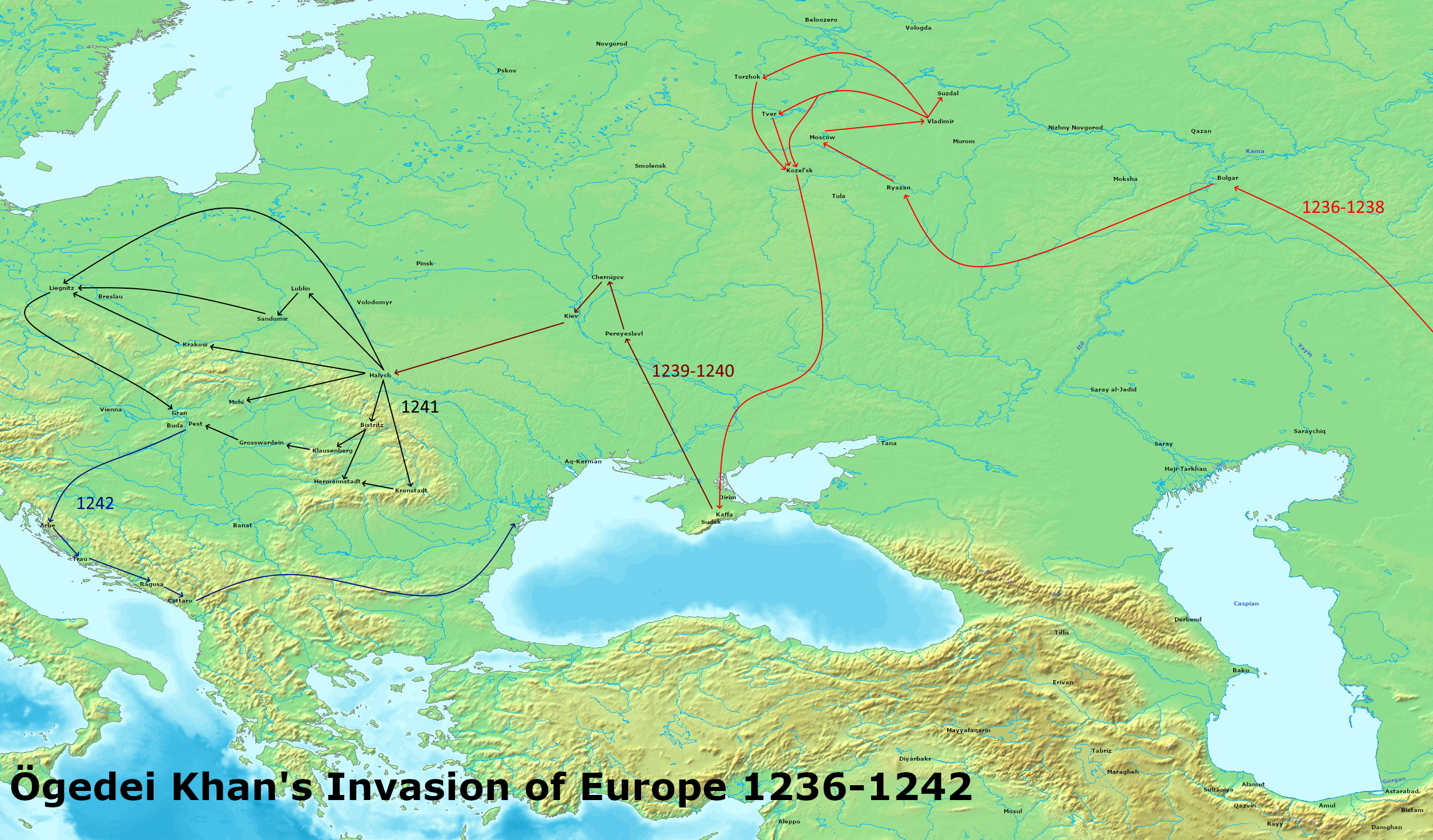
Mongol invasion of Europe, 1236-1242

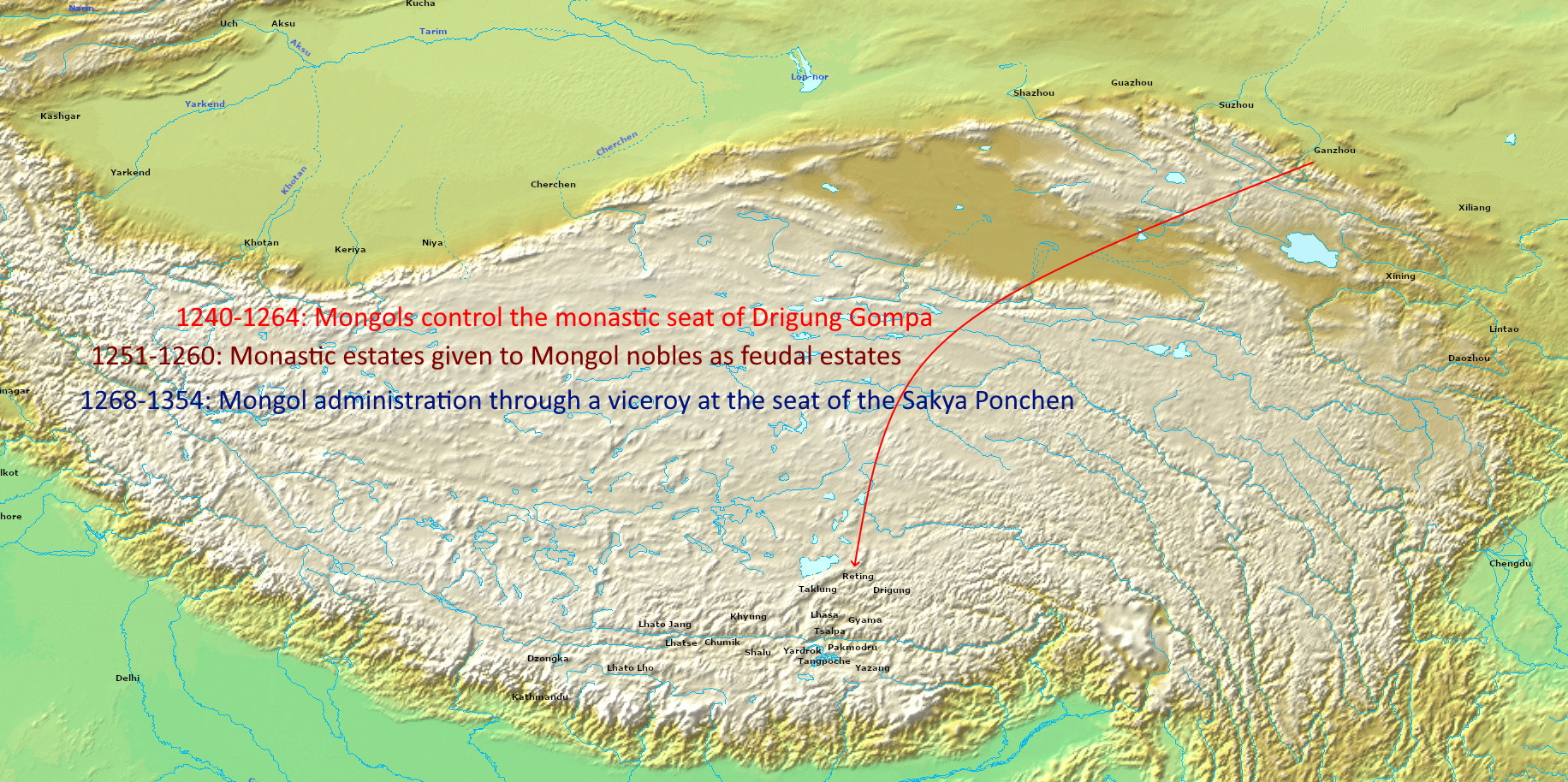
Mongol invasion of Tibet in 1240

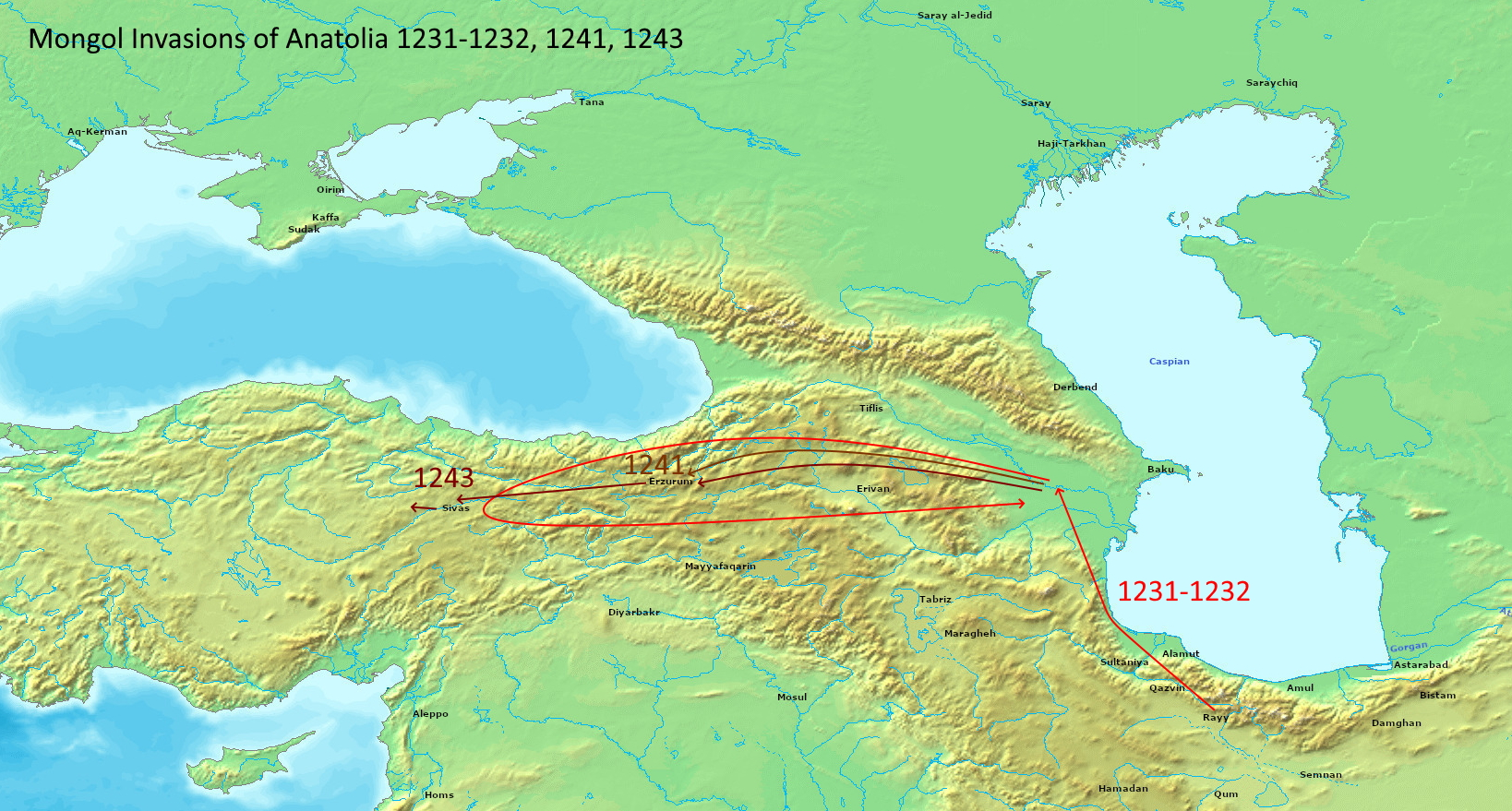
Mongol invasions of Anatolia, 1231, 1242

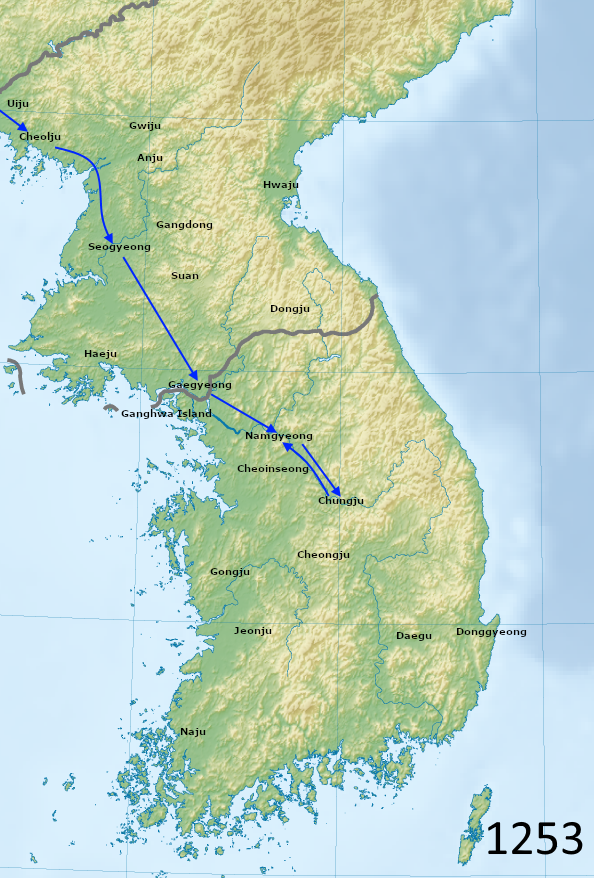
1253 Mongol invasion of Goryeo

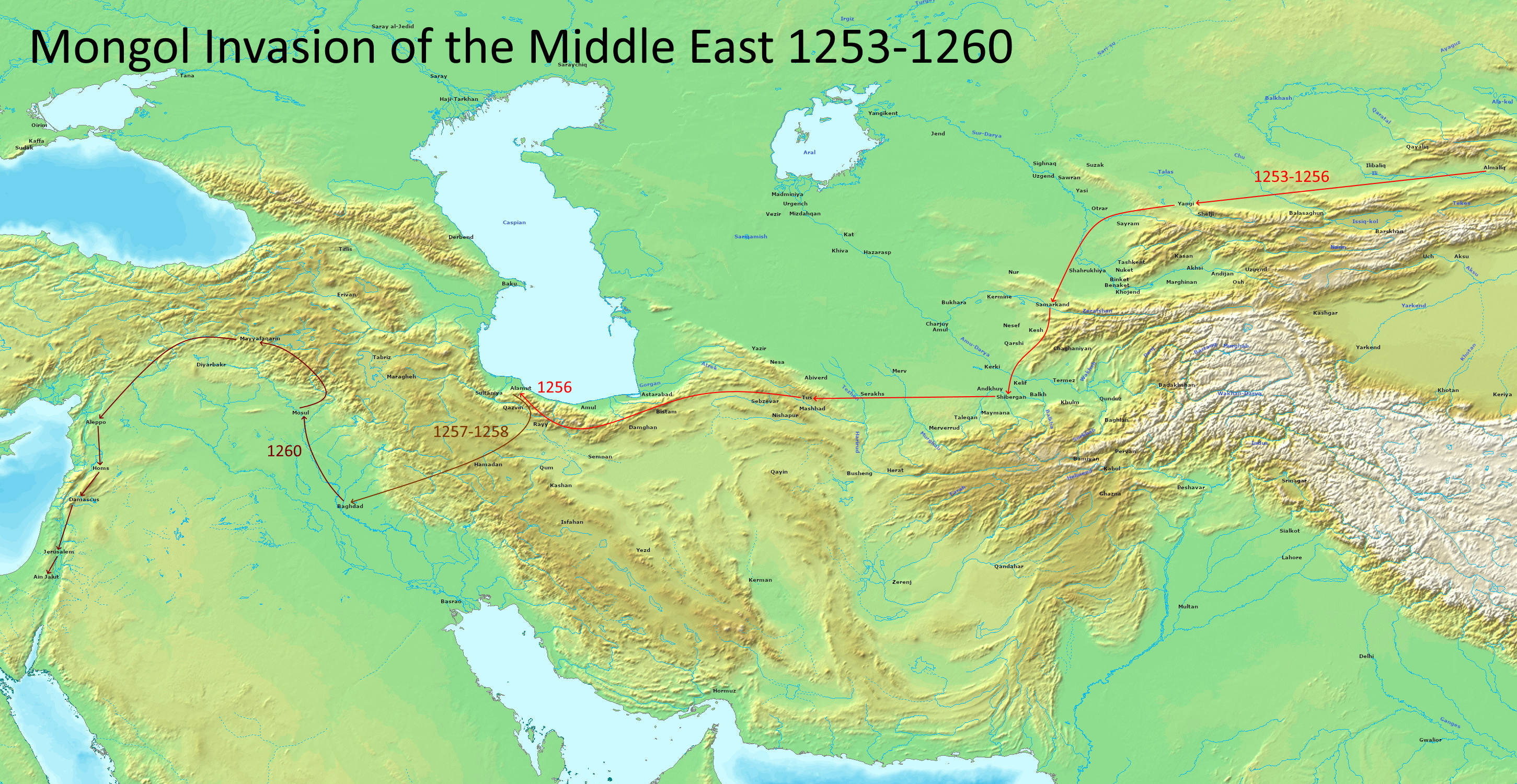
Mongol invasion of the Middle East (1253-1260)

1st Mongol invasion of Vietnam (1257-1258)

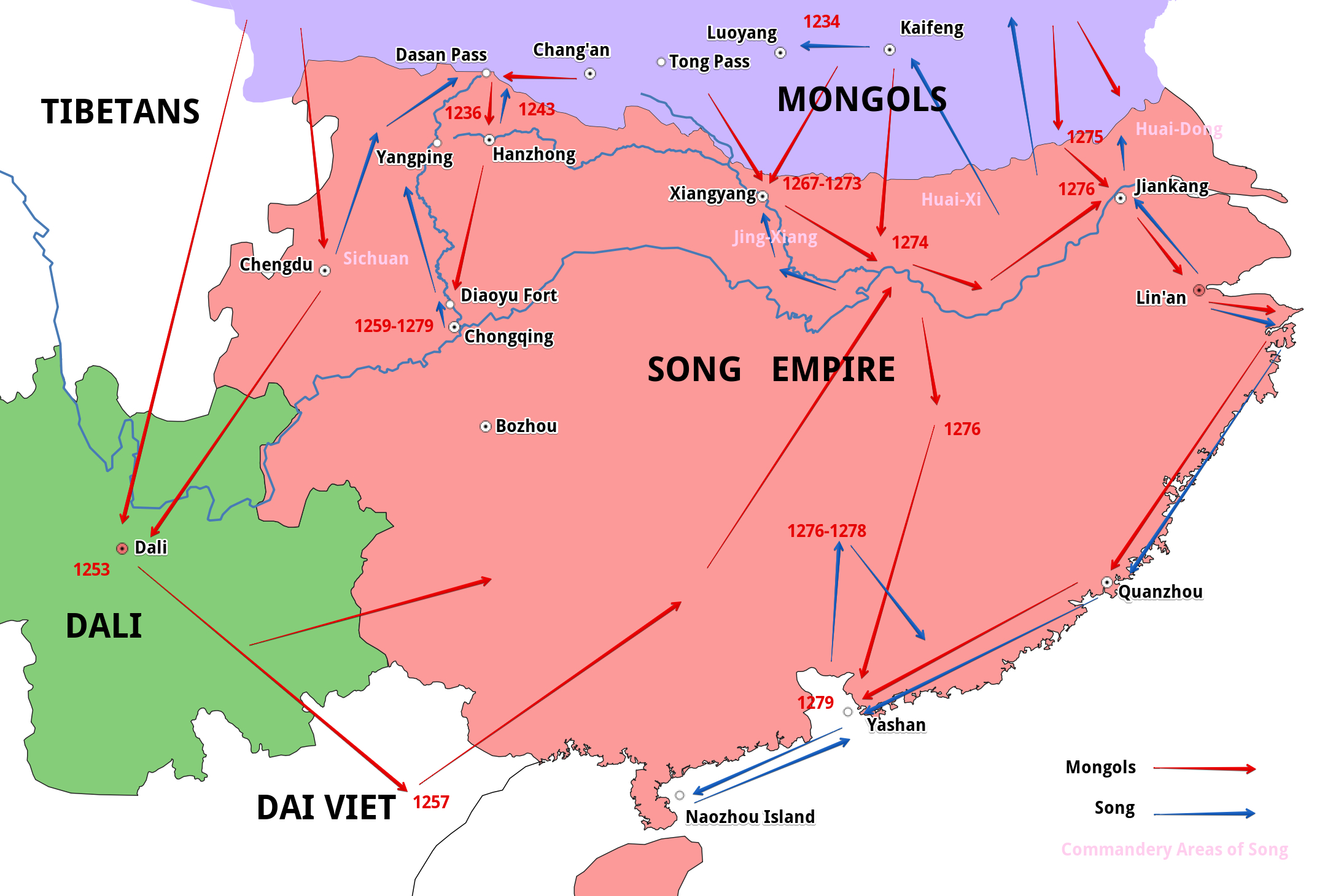
Mongol invasion of the Song dynasty (1234–79)

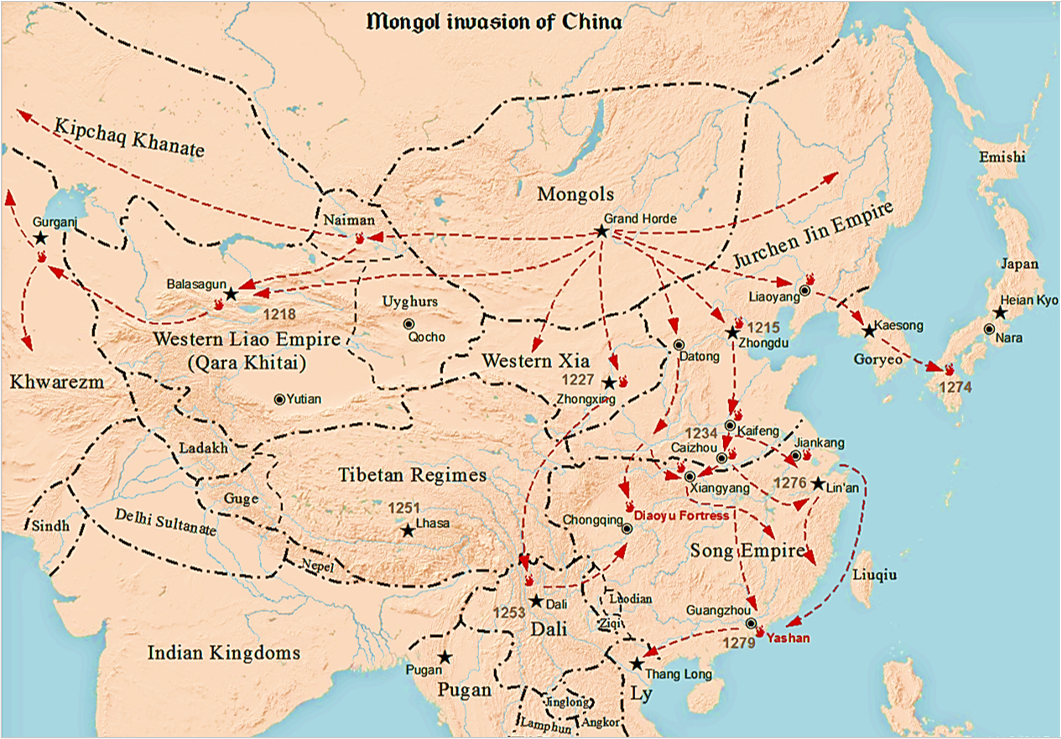
Mongol invasion of China (1205–1279)

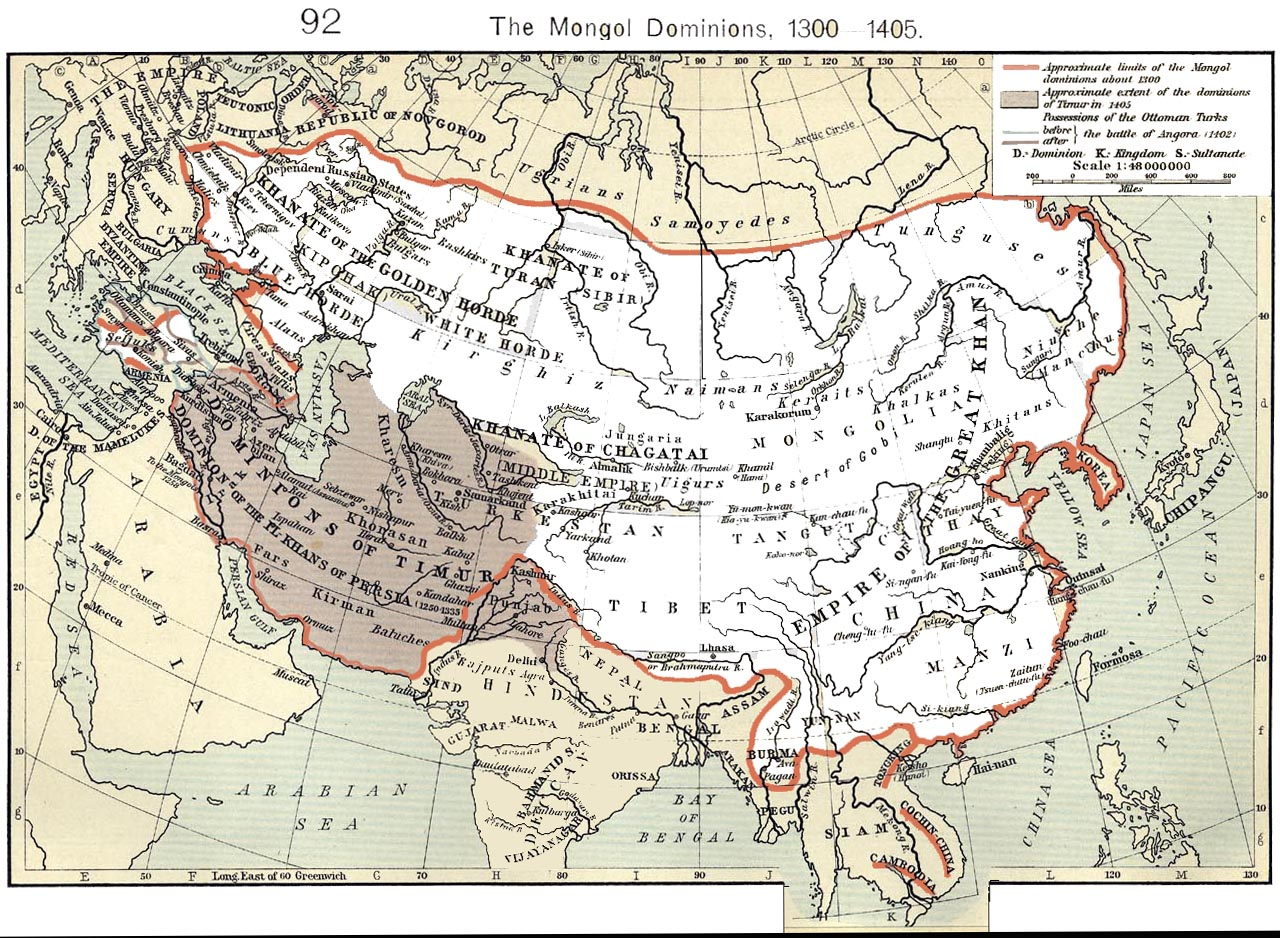
The Mongol Empire, ca. 1300. The gray area is the later Timurid empire.

== See also ==
- Timeline of the Golden Horde
- Timeline of the Chagatai Khanate
- Timeline of the Ilkhanate
- Timeline of the Yuan dynasty
- Timeline of Mongolian history
