= Boraqchin =

Boraqchin may refer to:

- Boraqchin (wife of Ögedei)
- Boraqchin (Tatar), wife of Batu Khan and regent for Ulaghchi
- Boraqchin Agachi, a wife of Hulagu Khan
