= Berke =

Khan of the Golden Horde from 1257 to 1266

Berke Khan
- Al Nasir li Din-Allah The Helper of the Religion of God; Nusrat al-Dunia al-Din Help of the World and the Religion
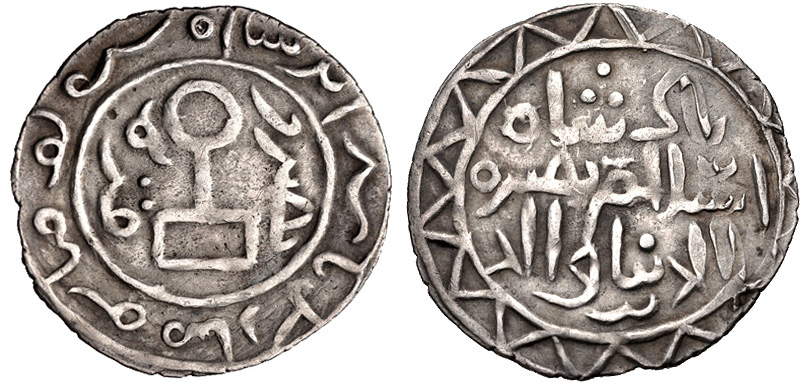
- Coinage of Berke, Qrim (Crimea) mint, struck circa AH 662–665 (AD 1263–1267).

Khan of the Golden Horde Western Half (Blue Horde)
- Reign: 1257–1266
- Predecessor: Ulaghchi
- Successor: Mengu-Timur
- Born: c. 1207; Burkhan Khaldun, Mongolia
- Died: 1266/1267 (aged 58–60); Kura River, Azerbaijan
- Spouse: Melike Hatun
- Issue: Tagtagai Khatun; Jijek Hatun; Urbay Khatun; Kehar Khatun
- Dynasty: Borjigin
- Father: Jochi
- Mother: Sultan Khatun
- Religion: Sunni Islam prev. Tengrism

Berke Khan (died 1266/1267; also Birkai; Turki/Kypchak: برکه خان, Mongolian: Бэрх хан ᠪᠡᠷᠬᠡ ᠬᠠᠭᠠᠨ Tatar: Бәркә хан) was a Mongol military commander and the ruler of the Golden Horde, a division of the Mongol Empire, (Note: The Russian colloquial name Golden Horde for the Kipchak Khanate is believed to have been derived from the steppe color system for the cardinal directions: black – north, blue – east, red – south, white – west, and yellow (or gold) – center, or from the golden field tent of the ruler.) who effectively consolidated the power of the Blue Horde and White Horde (Note: In this terminology the names Blue and White follow the Persian usage, as do most contemporary historians; in Turkish usage they are reversed, causing some confusion in secondary literature.) from 1257 to 1266. He was officially a grandson of Genghis Khan from his son Jochi (whose paternity is highly uncertain).

He succeeded his brother Batu Khan of the Blue Horde (West), and was responsible for the first official establishment of Islam in a khanate of the Mongol Empire. Following the Sack of Baghdad by Hulagu Khan, his cousin and head of the Mongol Ilkhanate based in Persia, he allied with the Egyptian Mamluks against Hulagu. Berke also supported Ariq Böke against Kublai in the Toluid Civil War, but did not intervene militarily in the war because he was occupied in his own war against Hulagu and the Ilkhanate.

== Name ==
Berke is a name used by both Turkic peoples and Mongols. In Mongolian berke (cf. bärk in Old Turkic) means "difficult, hard."

== Birth ==
Berke was born to Jochi, officially the eldest son of Genghis Khan but whose paternity is highly uncertain. There is no clear consensus regarding the year of Berke's birth. Mamluk ambassadors visiting his court in 663 AH (1264/5) described him as 56 years old. This gives him a birth date somewhere between 1207 and 1209. However, contemporary Persian chronicler Juzjani claims that Berke was born during the Mongol conquest of Khwarezmia, which took place between 1219 and 1221.

The latter claim was used to support the argument of historian Jean Richard that Berke's mother was Khan-Sultan (or Sultan Khatun), the captured daughter of Muhammad II of Khwarazm. The marriage between Jochi and Khan-Sultan took place in 1220, allowing Berke's birth to be no earlier than 1221.

== Background ==
Berke was present, with several of his brothers, at the inauguration of his uncle Ögedei as Great Khan in 1229.

In 1236, Berke joined his brothers Orda, Sinkur, and Shiban and an assortment of cousins under the leadership of Batu Khan in a vast army, comprising some 150,000 soldiers, which marched from Siberia and into the territory of the Muslim Volga Bulgars and Kipchaks, whom they then subdued. Batu and Subutai sent Berke to the country north of the Caucasus to conquer the Kipchaks there. Next, they devastated the principalities of Ryazan and Suzdal in 1237, and marched further into Russia. During the winter of 1238–39, Berke defeated the Kipchaks and imprisoned the chief of the Merkits. He afterwards subdued the steppe watered by the Kuma and the Terek west of the Caspian Sea.

Berke further served under his brother during the invasion of Europe, fighting at the Battle of the Mohi, where the Hungarian army was decimated. When Ögedei Khan died, and all the princes of the blood were summoned to return to Mongolia to select a Great Khan, Berke and his brothers joined Batu in the kurultai to elect a new Great Khan.

== Conversion to Islam ==
Berke Khan converted to Islam in the city of Bukhara in 1252. When he was at Saray-Jük, Berke met a caravan from Bukhara and questioned them about their faith. Berke was impressed with their faith and decided to convert to Islam. Berke then persuaded his brother Tukh-timur to become a Muslim as well.

In 1248, Batu sent Berke, along with his brother Tukh-timur, to Mongolia in order to install Möngke Khan on the throne of Great Khan. When he arrived, he invited the Chagatai and Ogedeyd families and conducted the kurultai in 1251, with Möngke being enthroned.

== Assuming the Golden Horde ==
The domains of the Golden Horde in 1389. The gold star shows the location of New Sarai, capital of the Golden Horde.

When Batu died in 1255, he was briefly succeeded by his eldest son and designated heir, Sartaq; however, he died shortly after being confirmed as leader by Möngke Khan. Ulaghchi was then nominated by Möngke, but he too died a few months into his regency. According to Arabic sources, the regent Boraqchin turned to Hülegü Khan for protection. Berke accused Boraqchin of high treason and she was subsequently executed.

Berke assumed leadership in 1257. He was an able ruler and succeeded in maintaining and stabilizing the Golden Horde, the western khanate of the Mongol Empire. During his government, the Mongols finally defeated the rebellion of Daniel of Galicia and made a second attack against Poland and Lithuania, led by general Burundai (Lublin, Zawichost, Sandomierz, Kraków and Bytom were plundered) in 1259. Also in 1265 there was a raid against Bulgaria and Byzantine Thrace. Michael of the Byzantine Empire also sent much valuable fabric to the Golden Horde as a tribute thereafter.

== Berke–Hulagu War ==
Berke became a devout Muslim. His conversion resulted in the Blue Horde becoming predominantly Muslim, although there were still animists and Buddhists among them. Berke was angered by Hulagu's destruction of Baghdad and was determined to deal with Hulagu Khan, who had murdered the Caliph al-Musta'sim, and whose territorial ambitions in Syria and Egypt threatened Berke's fellow Muslims. Muslim historian Rashid-al-Din Hamadani quoted Berke Khan as telling his Mongols and Muslim subjects, in protest at the attack on Baghdad, "He (Hulagu) has sacked all the cities of the Muslims, and has brought about the death of the Caliph. With the help of God I will call him to account for so much innocent blood."

In the meantime, the Ilkhanids led by Kitbuqa had fallen out with the crusaders holding the coast of Palestine, and the Mamluks had secured a pact of neutrality with them, passing through their territory, and defeating the Ilkhanate army at the Battle of Ain Jalut in 1260. Kitbuqa was killed. Palestine and Syria were regained, the border remaining the Tigris for the duration of Hulagu's dynasty. Berke's vow of vengeance against Hulagu had to wait until the latter's return to his lands after the death of Möngke Khan.

Before his succession, Berke Khan also complained to Batu, "We helped Möngke to enthrone. But he forgot who the enemy is or friend is. Now, he is starving the lands of our friend Caliph. It is abject." It is notable that Berke kept his promise, allying himself with the Mamluks, (Berke sought an alliance with the Mamluk sultan Baibars against Hulagu) and when Hulagu returned to his lands in 1262, after the succession was finally settled with Kublai as the last Great Khan, and massed his armies to avenge Ain Jalut and attack the Mamluks, Berke Khan initiated a series of raids in force which drew Hulagu north to meet him. This was the first open conflict between Mongols, and signalled the end of the unified empire. In retaliation for these attacks, Berke and Hulagu slaughtered each other's ortogh merchants.

However the reasons for the conflict between Berke and Hulagu were both religious and territorial. Möngke Khan gave lands in current day Azerbaijan, which had been given to Jochi by Genghis Khan, to his brother Hulagu. Although Berke did not like the situation, he was patient until Möngke's death.

Berke at first desisted from fighting Hulagu out of Mongol brotherhood, he said, "Mongols are killed by Mongol swords. If we were united, then we would have conquered all of the world." But the economic situation of the Golden Horde due to the actions of the Ilkhanate led him to declare jihad because of the Ilkhanids domination of the wealth of northern Iran, and the Ilkhanate's demands for the Golden Horde to not sell slaves to the Mamluks.

In 1262, the conflict turned into open war. Hulagu Khan suffered a severe defeat in an attempted invasion north of the Caucasus in 1263. Hulagu's forces were crushed at the Terek river by Berke's nephew Nogai, forcing Hulagu into retreat; he died in 1265. Next Chagatai Khan Alghu invaded Khwarizm and annexed Golden Horde lands. The Jochid army unsuccessfully tried to halt his advance. Berke and massacred each other's ortoq merchants in the Golden Horde and Iran.

Berke also supported Great Khan claimant Ariq Böke in the Toluid Civil War, and minted coins in the name of Ariq Böke. However Kublai defeated Ariq Böke by 1264. Kublai called both Hulagu and Berke to discuss Ariq Böke. However, both of them noted that they could not attend the Kurultai at the time, and a new Kurultai was never held.

== Death and aftermath ==
As Berke sought to cross the Kura river to attack Hulagu's son, Abaqa Khan, he fell ill and died sometime between 1266 and 1267. He was succeeded by his grandnephew, Mengu-Timur. The policy of alliance with the Mamluks, and containment of the Ilkhanate, was continued by Mengu-Timur. But by the 1270s, they had signed a peace treaty. In addition to the peace treaty, Abagha allowed Mengu-Temur to collect tax income from some of the workshops in his khanate.

== Ancestry ==
Yesugei Baghatur
Genghis Khan
Hoelun
Jochi Khan
Dei Seichen
Börte Ujin
Tacchotan
Berke Khan
Sultan Khatun

== See also ==
- List of khans of the Golden Horde
- Berke–Hulagu war
- William of Rubruck
- Negudar

== Notes ==
Berke House of Borjigin (1206–1634) Died: 1266
Regnal titles
| Preceded by Ulaghchi | Khan of the Golden Horde; 1257–1266 | Succeeded by Mengu-Timur |
