= Sartaq Khan =

Khan of the Golden Horde from 1256 to 1257

Sartaq
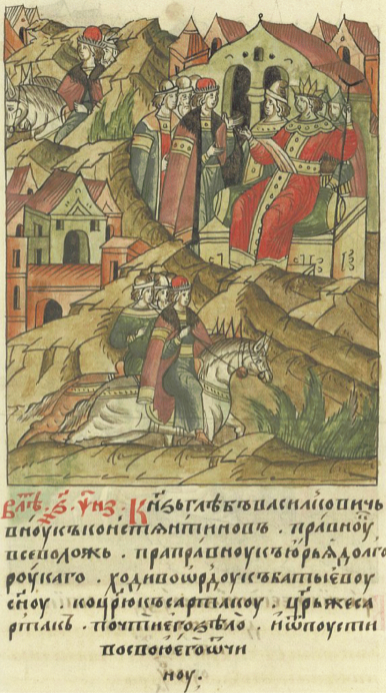
- Gleb of Beloozero visits Sartaq, miniature from the Illustrated Chronicle of Ivan the Terrible

Khan of the Golden Horde Western Half (Blue Horde)
- Coronation: 1256
- Reign: 1256–1257
- Predecessor: Batu Khan
- Successor: Ulaghchi
- Died: 1257
Names
- Sartaq Khan
- House: Borjigin
- Dynasty: Golden Horde
- Father: Batu Khan
- Mother: Boraqchin
- Religion: Christianity prev. Tengrism

Sartaq Khan (or Sartak, Sartach; Mongolian: Сартаг; Tatar: Сартак; died 1257) was the eldest son of Batu Khan by his senior wife Boraqchin. He succeeded his father as ruler of the Golden Horde, but died not long into his reign. He was succeeded by Ulaghchi.

== Reign ==
Sartaq was the eldest son of Batu Khan and his designated heir. Sartaq was a Christian, but continued with shamanist practices. During Batu's reign, Sartaq was entrusted with dealing with the Russians and all Christians in his territory. In particular, he was responsible for making the Russian princes ratify their rule by appearing in front of the khan's court. According to the 18th-century historian Vasily Tatishchev, the prince Alexander Nevsky complained to Sartaq about his brother for "deceiving the khan, taking the grand principality from the senior prince [Aleksandr] and not paying in full the taxes and tributes to the khan", after which Alexander returned to Vladimir with the grand princely throne.

After Batu died, Sartaq was confirmed as leader by Möngke Khan. During his short reign, Sartaq ordered the construction of a Nestorian church in a new settlement he built along one of the routes in his territory. Sartaq had his own horde on the west bank of the Volga. Following Sartaq's death, he was succeeded by Ulaghchi, who was either the fourth son of Batu or Sartaq's son. Ulaghchi was confirmed by Möngke; however, as he was a child, Batu's primary wife Boraqchin served as regent for Ulaghchi, who died not long into his reign. Boraqchin was later accused of high treason by Berke and was subsequently executed.

== Family ==
Sartaq had six wives in total. One of his daughters was married to Gleb of Beloozero in 1257.

== See also ==
- List of khans of the Golden Horde
- Christianity among the Mongols

== Sources ==
- Boguslavsky, Vladimir V.; Kuksina, Elena I. (2001). "Глеб Василькович". Славянская энциклопедия. Киевская Русь — Московия. Т. 1: А–М (in Russian). Moskva: ОЛМА Медиа Групп. pp. 279–280. ISBN 9785224022502.
- Favereau, Marie (20 April 2021). The Horde: How the Mongols Changed the World. Harvard University Press. ISBN 978-0-674-24421-4.
- Favereau, Marie; Pochekaev, Roman Yu. (2023). "The Golden Horde, c. 1260–1502". The Cambridge History of the Mongol Empire. Cambridge University Press. pp. 243–318. ISBN 978-1-107-11648-1.
- Fennell, John (2014) [1983]. The Crisis of Medieval Russia, 1200–1304. Longman History of Russia. Routledge. ISBN 978-0-582-48150-3.
- Kalra, Prajakti (20 March 2018). The Silk Road and the Political Economy of the Mongol Empire. Routledge. ISBN 978-1-351-85017-9.

Sartaq Khan House of Borjigin (1206–1634) Died: 1256
Regnal titles
Preceded by Batu Khan	Khan of the Blue Horde and Golden Horde; 1255–1256	Succeeded by Ulaghchi
