= Boroldai =

Mongolian general (died 1263)

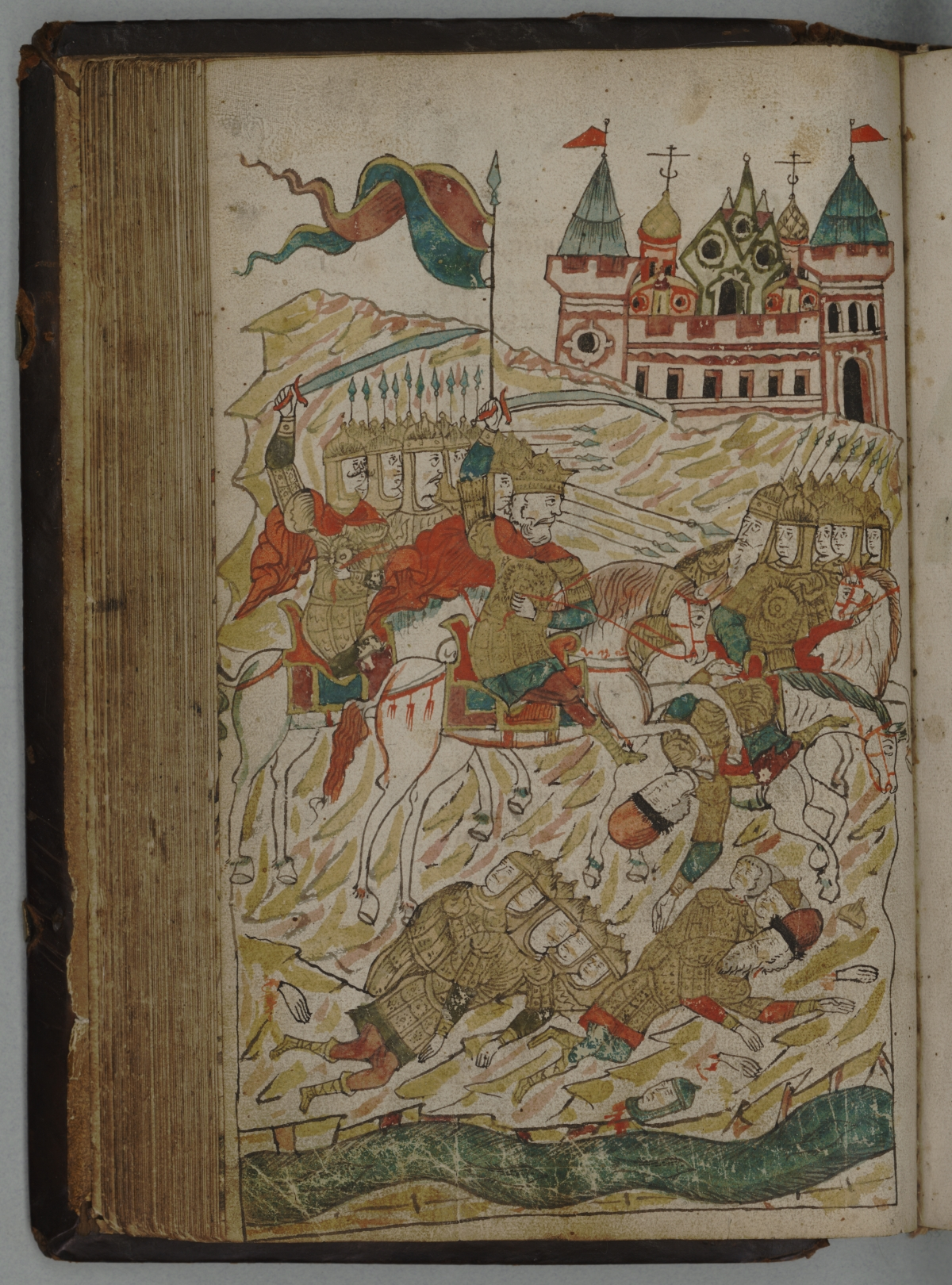
The Battle of the Sit River, where Borolday's vanguard surprised and crushed the army of grand prince Yuri II of Vladimir in 1238.

Boroldai (or Burulday, Borolday), also known as Burundai, (Cyrillic: Боролдай) (died 1263) was a Mongol general of the mid 13th century. He participated in the Mongol invasion of Kievan Rus' and Europe from 1236 to 1242 He distinguished himself in the conquest of Ryazan and Suzdal. He led other Mongol raids of Europe until 1263.

The clan of Borolday is not clear. He was probably from one of four tribes that Genghis Khan (1162–1227) assigned to his eldest son, Jochi: the Sanchi'ud (or Salji'ud), Keniges, Uushin, and Je'ured clans.

== Career ==
Serving under Jochi's successor and son, Batu Khan, Borolday's vanguard surprised and crushed the army of grand prince Yuri II of Vladimir at the Battle of the Sit River in 1238. He also participated in the Siege of Kiev in 1240. After the conquest of Rus', the Mongols also invaded other parts of Eastern and Central Europe. His name appears as Bujgai or Bujakh in The Secret History of the Mongols, according to which, Ögedei, Khagan of the Mongol Empire, praised Subutai and Bujgai's merit when he criticized his son Güyük's arrogant behaviour during the campaign. Borolday assisted Subutai to prepare the strategy for the final assault during the Battle of Mohi (1241). Borolday's division directly attacked the main camp of King Béla IV of Hungary. Batu's brother Shiban's vanguard supported this attack. After a difficult fight, Batu's army crushed the Hungarians and their allies, Croats and Templar Knights at Mohi on April 11, 1241.

During the succession struggle for the throne of the Mongol Empire in early 1251, 100,000 Jochid troops under Borolday were stationed near Otrar to keep an eye on the Chagatayids who allied with the Ögedeids against Batu's cousin and ally, Möngke.

In 1255, Daniel of Galicia revolted against the Mongol rule. He repelled the initial Mongol assault under Orda's son Quremsa. Berke replaced Quremsa, son of his eldest brother Orda, with the much experienced Borolday. The latter led a force that overcame the resistance of Danylo of Halych in 1259. According to some sources, Daniel fled to Poland leaving his son and brother at the mercy of the Mongol army. He may have hidden in the castle of Galicia instead. The Mongols needed to halt Poland's aid to Daniel as well as war booty to feed the demand of their soldiers. Boroldai forced him to demolish all walls of cities in Galich and Volhynia. The Mongols knew that the Lithuanians had raided Mongol vassals, Smolensk and Torzhok, in the previous year. Alongside Talabuga Khan and Nogai, Boroldai led a punitive expedition against the Grand Duchy of Lithuania. The Mongols attacked Lithuania, but the Lithuanians fled before the decisive battle. After pillaging several villages and towns in Lithuania, Borolday returned to Galich and demanded Daniel assist him in his battle against the Poles. The Rus soldiers under Daniel's son, Lev, and brother, Vasily, joined the Mongol expedition. Lublin, Sandomierz, Zawichost, Kraków, and Bytom were ravaged and plundered by the Mongol army. Berke had no intention of occupying or conquering Poland. After this raid, Pope Alexander IV tried without success to organize a crusade against the Mongols.

After 1259, Boroldai's name does not appear again in Rus' chronicles. A general named Burulday was killed in the battle at the Terek River on 13 January 1263, during the Berke–Hulagu war. This may have been Boroldai. His name appears in the opera The Legend of the Invisible City of Kitezh and the Maiden Fevroniya (1907) by Nikolai Rimsky-Korsakov, and in Mongolian fairy tales.

== Sources ==
- Ж.Бор - Монгол хийгээд Евразийн дипломат шаштир боть 2
- Grousset, René (1970). The Empire of the Steppes: A History of Central Asia. New Brunswick, N.J: Rutgers University Press. ISBN 0-8135-0627-1.
- Rashid-al-Din Hamadani. Jami' al-Tawarikh ("Compendium of Chronicles")
