= Battle of the Sit River =

Part of Mongol invasion of Kievan Rus'

Coordinates: 58°04′07″N 37°51′07″E

- Part of the Mongol invasion of Kievan Rus'
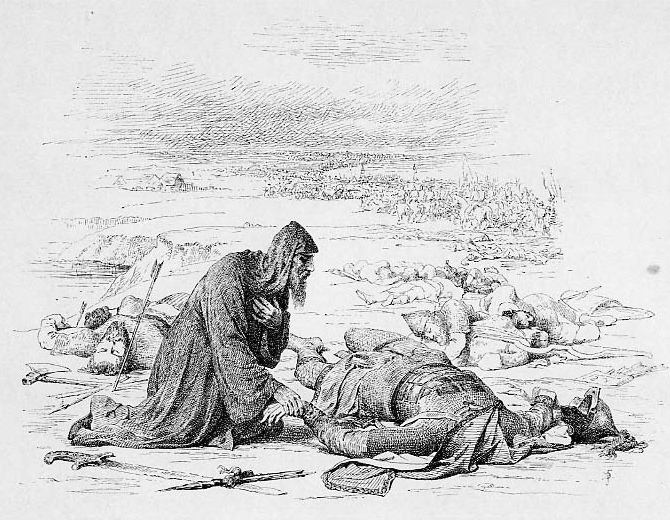
- Bishop Cyril finds the headless body of Grand Duke Yuri on the field of the battle
| Date | 4 March 1238 |
| Location | Modern-day Yaroslavl Oblast |
| Result | Mongol victory |

Belligerents
| Mongol Empire | Vladimir-Suzdal |

Commanders and leaders
| Burundai | Yuri II of Vladimir † |

Strength
| At least one tumen (10,000) of nomadic cavalry | More than 3,000, mostly infantry |

Casualties and losses
| Heavy | Devastating |

The Battle of the Sit River took place on 4 March 1238 between the Mongol forces of Batu Khan and the army of Vladimir-Suzdal led by Grand Prince Yuri II of Vladimir during the Mongol invasion of Kievan Rus'. The engagement occurred in the northern part of what is now the Sonkovsky District of Tver Oblast, near the selo of Bozhonka.

== Battle ==
After the Mongols sacked his capital, Vladimir on the Klyazma, Yuri fled north across the Volga to Yaroslavl, where he hastily assembled an army. He and his brothers then marched back toward Vladimir in the hope of relieving the city, but they arrived too late.

Yuri dispatched a force of 3,000 men under Dorozh to determine the location of the Mongol army. Dorozh returned with the report that Yuri’s force was already surrounded. As Yuri attempted to form his troops for battle, they were attacked by the Mongol detachment under Burundai. Yuri fled but was overtaken on the Sit River and killed there along with his nephew, Prince Vsevolod of Yaroslavl.

== Aftermath ==
The battle marked the end of unified resistance to the Mongols and inaugurated nearly two centuries of Mongol domination over the Russian lands.
