= Boraqchin (Tatar) =

Senior wife of Batu Khan

Boraqchin Khatun was an Alchi Tatar woman, one of the Tatar tribes that roamed the east of Mongolia.

She was the chief or senior wife of Batu Khan, a grandson of Genghis Khan, and probably the mother of Sartaq Khan. In 1257, she served as regent of the Golden Horde on behalf of Ulaghchi, who was Sartaq's son and probably her grandson. After Ulaghchi's death, Berke ousted Boraqchin and took control of the Golden Horde.
