= Nusrat =

Nusrat or Nusret or Nasrat (Arabic: نصرت) is a unisex given name, meaning 'victory' in Arabic. Notable people with the name include:

== Men with the name ==
=== Nasrat ===
- Hiztullah Yar Nasrat, Afghan detainee in Guantanamo
- Nasiruddin Nasrat Shah (died 1532), sultan of Bengal
- Nasrat Al Jamal (born 1980), Lebanese footballer
- Nasrat Haqparast (born 1995), German professional MMA fighter
- Nasrat Khan (born 1926), Afghan detainee in Guantanamo
- Nasrat Parsa (1969–2005), Afghan singer
- Nasratullah Nasrat (born 1984), Afghan cricketer

=== Nusrat ===
- Nusrat al-Din Muhammad (died c. 1330), Mihrabanid malik of Sistan
- Nusrat Fateh Ali Khan (1948–1997), Pakistani musician
- Nusrat Hussain, Pakistani pop singer
- Nusrat Javed, Pakistani journalist
- Nusrat Kasamanli (1946–2003), Azerbaijani poet
- Rahat Nusrat Fateh Ali Khan (born 1974), Pakistani musician

=== Nusret ===
- Nusret Çolpan (1952–2008), Turkish artist
- Nusret Fişek (1914–1990), Turkish scholar
- Nusret Gökçe (born 1983), Turkish chef (also known as Salt Bae)
- Nusret Suman 1905–1978), Turkish sculptor
- Nusret Muslimović, Bosnian football manager

== Women with the name ==
- Halide Nusret Zorlutuna (1901–1984), Turkish poet and novelist
- Nusrat Bhutto (1929–2011), Pakistani politician, wife of Prime Minister Zulfikar Ali Bhutto and mother of Prime Minister Benazir Bhutto
- Nusrat Imrose Tisha (born 1983), Bangladeshi actress, model, and producer
- Nusrat Jahan Begum (1865–1952), a wife of Ahmadiyya Community founder Mirza Ghulam Ahmad
- Nusrat Bharucha (born 1985), Indian actress
- Nusrat Jahan (born 1990), Indian actress

== See also ==
- The dictionary definition of نصرت at Wiktionary
