= Ulaghchi =

Khan of the Golden Horde in 1257

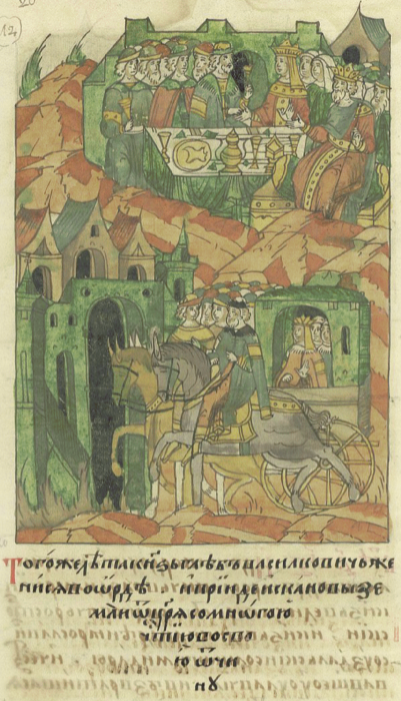
- Gleb of Beloozero visits Ulaghchi, miniature from the Illustrated Chronicle of Ivan the Terrible

Khan of the Golden Horde Western Half (Blue Horde)
- Reign: 1257
- Predecessor: Sartaq Khan
- Successor: Berke
- Died: 1257
- Dynasty: Jochids
- Religion: Tengrism

Ulaghchi (Ulaqchi or Ulavchii) Khan (Mongolian: Улаагч Хаан; Tatar: Улакчы хан; died 1257) was the third khan of the Blue Horde and Golden Horde, ruling for less than a year in 1257.

== Life ==
Ulaghchi was a direct descendant of Batu Khan, but it is not known whether he was the son or younger brother of Sartaq Khan. After Sartaq's death in 1257, he was nominated by Möngke Khan to become leader of the Jochid ulus.

Since Ulaghchi was a child, Boraqchin, the primary wife of Batu Khan, became regent for Ulaghchi. However, he died not long into his reign. According to Arabic sources, Boraqchin turned to Hülegü Khan for protection since he dominated the Middle East. Batu's brother Berke accused Boraqchin of high treason and she was subsequently executed.

H. H. Howorth claimed that he abdicated in favor of his uncle Berke, because the young man sent a person named Ulaghchi to Russia as his lieutenant after he was enthroned.

== Genealogy ==
- Genghis Khan
- Jochi
- Batu Khan
- Ulaghchi

== See also ==
- List of khans of the Golden Horde

== Sources ==
- Favereau, Marie (20 April 2021). The Horde: How the Mongols Changed the World. Harvard University Press. ISBN 978-0-674-24421-4.
- Favereau, Marie; Pochekaev, Roman Yu. (2023). "The Golden Horde, c. 1260–1502". The Cambridge History of the Mongol Empire. Cambridge University Press. pp. 243–318. ISBN 978-1-107-11648-1.

Ulaghchi House of Borjigin (1206–1634) Died: 1257
Regnal titles
Preceded by Sartaq	Khan of the Blue Horde and Golden Horde; 1257	Succeeded by Berke
