= Batu Khan =

Founder and first Khan of the Golden Horde (r. 1227–1255)

ᠪᠠᠲᠤ ᠬᠠᠭᠠᠨ Batu Khan
- Khan
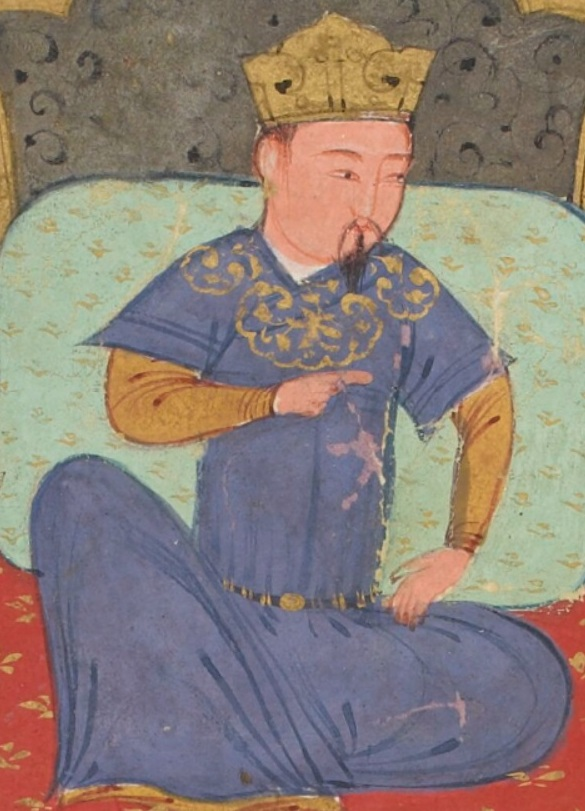
- Batu Khan depicted by Rashid al-Din

Khan of the Golden Horde Western Half (Blue Horde)
- Reign: 1227–1255
- Coronation: 1224/25 or 1227
- Predecessor: Jochi
- Successor: Sartak
- Born: c. 1205; Khamag Mongol
- Died: 1255 (aged 49–50); Sarai Batu, Golden Horde
- Consort: Boraqchin Khatun
- Issue: Sartak; Toqoqan
- House: Borjigin
- Dynasty: Jochids
- Father: Jochi
- Mother: Ukhaa Ujin of the Onggirat
- Religion: Tengrism
- Military career
- Allegiance: Golden Horde
- Conflicts: See list: Mongol invasion of Volga Bulgaria; • Siege of Bilär; Mongol invasion of Kievan Rus'; • Siege of Ryazan; • Battle of Voronezh River; • Siege of Moscow (1238); • Siege of Vladimir; • Siege of Kozelsk; • Sack of Chernigov; • Siege of Kiev (1240); Mongol invasion of Europe; • Battle of Mohi; • Siege of Esztergom (1241); • Battle of Grobnik Field

Batu Khan (Note: /ˈbɑːtuː ˈkɑːn/; Bat haan, Tatar: Бату хан; Chinese: 拔都汗; pinyin: Bádū Hán; Russian: хан Баты́й, romanized: khan Batyj; Ukrainian: хан Батий, romanized: khan Batyj.) (c. 1205–1255) was a Mongol ruler and founder of the Golden Horde, a constituent of the Mongol Empire established after Genghis Khan's demise. Batu was a son of Jochi, thus officially a grandson of Genghis Khan (Jochi's paternity is highly uncertain). His ulus ruled over the Kievan Rus', Volga Bulgaria, Cumania, and the Caucasus for around 250 years.

== Personality and appearance ==
According to Giovanni da Pian del Carpine, Batu was "kind enough to his own people, but he is greatly feared by them. He is, however, most cruel in fight; he is very shrewd and extremely crafty in warfare, for he has been waging war for a long time." He received the nickname of сайн (lit. 'good'), by which he was referred to by Marco Polo. William of Rubruck described him as about the height of his lord John de Beaumont and as having his entire face covered with reddish spots.

== Early years ==
After Jochi's death, Genghis Khan assigned Jochi's appanages to his sons. The Great Khan installed Batu as Khan of the Golden Horde (also known as the Ulus of Jochi or Kipchak Khanate). Jochi's eldest son, Orda Khan, also agreed that Batu should succeed their father. Genghis Khan's youngest brother Temüge attended the coronation ceremony as an official representative of Genghis. When Genghis Khan died in 1227, he left 4,000 Mongol men to Jochi's family. Jochi's lands were divided between Batu and his older brother Orda. Orda's White Horde ruled the lands roughly between the Volga river and Lake Balkhash, while Batu's Golden Horde ruled the lands west of the Volga.

In 1229, Ögedei dispatched three tumens under Kukhdei, Sundei and Humpdei to conquer the tribes on the lower Ural River. According to Abulghazi, Batu joined Ögedei's military campaign against the Jin dynasty in North China while his younger brother was fighting the Bashkirs, the Cumans, the Bulghars and the Alans in the west. Despite heavy resistance from their enemies, the Mongols conquered major cities of the Jurchens and made the Bashkirs their ally. In the 1230s, Ögedei distributed lands in Shanxi to Batu and the family of Jochi, but they appointed their officials under the supervision of the Imperial governor, and likewise in Khorasan.

== Conquest of Kievan Rus' ==
At the kurultai in Mongolia after the end of the Mongol-Jin War, the Great Khan Ögedei ordered Batu to conquer western nations. In 1235 Batu, who earlier had directed the conquest of the Crimean Peninsula, was assigned an army of possibly 130,000 to oversee an invasion of Europe. His relatives and cousins Güyük, Büri, Möngke, Khulgen, Khadan, Baidar and notable Mongol generals Subutai (Subeedei), Borolday, and Mengguser joined him by the order of his uncle Ögedei. The army, actually commanded by Subutai, crossed the Volga and invaded Volga Bulgaria in 1236. It took them a year to extinguish the resistance of the Volga Bulgarians, Kypchaks, and Alani.

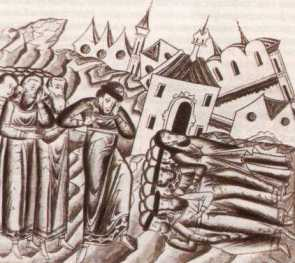
Destruction of the capital of Vladimir-Suzdal by Mongol armies. From the medieval Russian annals

In November 1237 Batu Khan sent his envoys to the court of Yuri II of Vladimir-Suzdal and demanded his allegiance. When Yuri refused to surrender the Mongols besieged Ryazan. After six days of bloody battle, the city was totally annihilated and never restored to its former glory. Alarmed by the news, Yuri II sent his sons to detain the horde, but they were soundly defeated. Having burnt Kolomna and Moscow, the horde laid siege to the capital of Vladimir-Suzdal on 4 February 1238. Three days later the city was taken and burnt to the ground. The royal family perished in the fire, while the grand prince hastily retreated northward. Crossing the Volga, he mustered a new army, which was totally exterminated by the Mongols on the Sit' River on 4 March.

Thereupon Batu Khan divided his army into smaller units, which ransacked fourteen Rus' cities: Rostov, Uglich, Yaroslavl, Kostroma, Kashin, Ksnyatin, Gorodets, Galich, Pereslavl-Zalessky, Yuriev-Polsky, Dmitrov, Volokolamsk, Tver, and Torzhok. The most difficult to take was the small town of Kozelsk, whose boy-prince Titus and inhabitants resisted the Mongols for seven weeks. As the legend goes, at the news of Mongol approach, the city of Kitezh was submerged in a lake with all its inhabitants. Khadan and Buri stormed the city in three days after they joined Batu. The only major cities to escape destruction were Smolensk, which submitted to the Mongols and agreed to pay tribute, and Novgorod with Pskov, which could not be reached by the Mongols on account of considerable distance and the intervening marshlands.

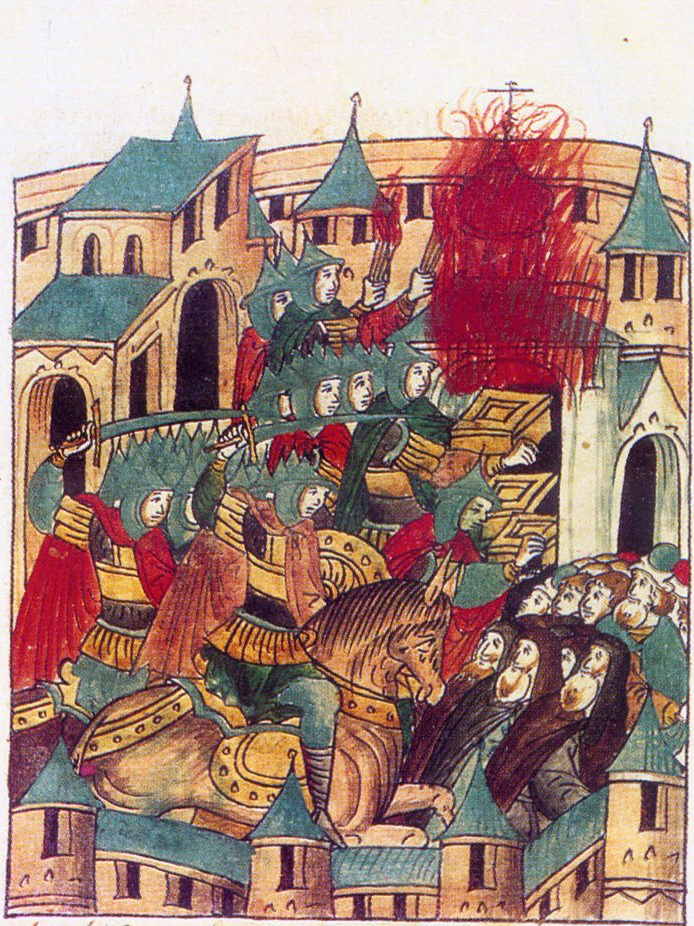
Warriors of the Golden Horde sack Suzdal.

When Batu drank a cup of wine before the others at the victory banquet, Büri complained of the unfairness of Batu receiving such a vast and fertile steppe, and the Mongol army, along with Güyük and others, ridiculed Batu as an "old woman with a beard". They then left the banquet. Batu sent an envoy to his uncle Ögedei to complain of his cousins' rude behavior. Ögedei got angry on hearing the news and recalled Buri and Güyük. According to some sources, Buri, who was sent to his grandfather Chagatai, never returned to join the Mongol conquest of Europe; Güyük returned to the Russian steppe after his father Ögedei harshly criticized him.

In the summer of 1238, Batu Khan devastated the Crimea and pacified Mordovia and the Kipchak-controlled steppe. In the winter of 1239, he sacked Chernigov and Pereyaslav. After several days of siege, the Mongols stormed Kiev in December 1240. Despite fierce resistance by Danylo of Halych, Batu Khan managed to take the two principal capitals of his land, Halych and Volodymyr. Ruthenian principalities became vassals of the Mongol Empire.

== Invasion of Central Europe ==
The Cuman refugees took shelter in the Kingdom of Hungary. Batu sent at least five messengers to Béla IV, the King of Hungary, but they were all killed. For the last time Batu demanded that Bela have the Cumans returned and warned: "It is much easier for the Cumans to escape than it is for you...you dwell in houses and have fixed towns and fortresses, so how will you escape me?" Batu Khan then decided to "reach the ultimate sea", where the Mongols could proceed no further. Some modern historians speculate that Batu intended primarily to assure his flanks were safe for the future from possible interference from the Europeans, and partially as a precursor to further conquest. Most believe he intended the conquest of all Europe, as soon as his flanks were safe and his forces ready.

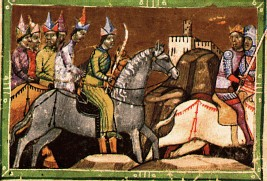
Béla IV flees from Mohi, detail from Chronicon Pictum

Having devastated the various Rus' principalities, Subutai and Batu sent spies into Poland, Hungary, and as far as Austria in preparation for an attack into the heartland of Europe. With a clear picture of the European kingdoms, they brilliantly prepared an attack. Batu Khan was the overall leader, but Subutai was the actual commander in the field and as such was present in both the northern and southern campaigns against Rus'. The Mongols invaded central Europe in three groups. One group invaded and devastated Poland, defeating a combined force under Henry II the Pious, Duke of Silesia and the Grand Master of the Teutonic Order at Legnica. A second crossed the Carpathian Mountains, and a third followed the Danube. The armies swept the plains of Hungary over the summer, and in the spring of 1242 they regained impetus and extended their control into Austria and Dalmatia, as well as invading Morava.

While the northern force under Ögedei's son Khadan and Baidar, the son of Chagatai, won the Battle of Legnica, and another army of Güyük or Büri triumphed in Transylvania, Subutai was waiting for another victory over the Magyars, the Croats, and the Templars on the Hungarian plain. In 1241, a Tatar (Mongol) army led by Bujek crossed the mountains of the Kara Ulagh ("Black Vlachs"); Bujek defeated the Vlachs and one of their leader named Mišlav. However, the Mongol Army was defeated by Ivan Asen II of the Second Bulgarian Empire shortly afterward. After the siege of Pest, Batu's army withdrew to the Sajo River and inflicted a tremendous defeat on King Béla IV and his allies at the Battle of Mohi on 11 April. Khadan, Baidar, and Orda went to Hungary, devastating Moravia en route. The Mongols appointed a darughachi in Hungary and minted coins in the name of the Khagan. The country of Béla was assigned to Orda by Batu as an appanage; Batu sent Khadan in pursuit of Béla, who retreated to Croatia.

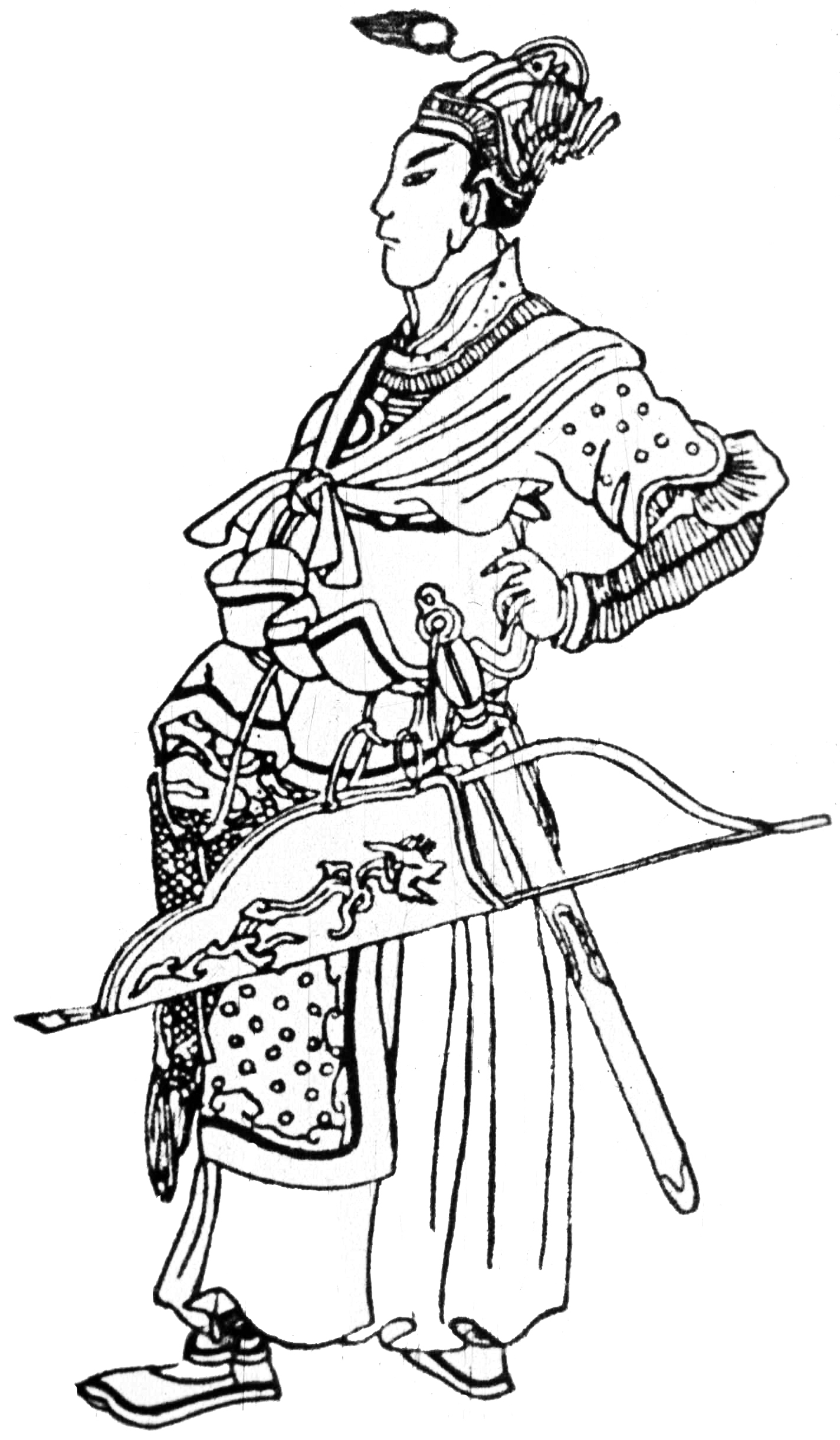
Medieval Chinese drawing of young Batu Khan (14th century).

The Mongol battalions checked the forces of the Holy Roman Empire and Babenberg Austria. During his campaign in Central Europe, Batu demanded that Frederick II, the Holy Roman Emperor, dethrone himself, and said: "I am coming to usurp your throne instead of you". The latter only replied that he would make a good falconer, for he understood birds very well. The Emperor and Pope Gregory IX called for a crusade against the Mongol Empire, but Europe was plagued by internal strife. Subutai achieved lasting fame with his victories in Europe, as he had in Eastern Persia.

By late 1241, Batu and Subutai were finalizing plans to invade Austria, Italy, and Germany when the news came of the death of Ögedei Khan, who died in December 1241. Batu wanted to continue the war, but Subutai reminded him of the law of Yassa (Их Засаг). The Mongols withdrew in late spring of 1242, as the Princes of the Blood, and Subutai, were recalled to Karakorum where the kurultai was held. Batu was a potential Great Khan, but when he failed to gain the title he turned to consolidate his conquests in Asia and the Urals.

== Viceroy and struggle with Güyük ==
Withdrawing from Hungary, Batu made his camps along the banks of the Volga. When the Great Khatun Töregene invited him to elect the next Emperor of the Mongol Empire, Batu announced his inability to attend any immediate kurultai, thus delaying the succession for several years. Eventually, Güyük was elected Khagan in 1246, with Batu's brothers representing the Jochid lineage. As one of the oldest members of Chingisid Borjigin, Batu became a viceroy over all the western parts of the empire, controlling routine affairs among the Rus' princes, nominating Jochid retainers as governors of Iran, and receiving in audience grandees from the Caucasus. At no point, however, did he openly challenge the authority of the Great Khan.

During the absence of Batu, the Mongols who were left behind put to death Mstislav, the prince of Rylsk, in Kievan Rus'. On his return Batu summoned the Grand prince Yaroslav II of Vladimir to meet him. Yaroslav was well received by Batu, who confirmed him as suzerain over the other Rus' princes, and gave him authority of Kiev. The princes of Suzdal followed Yaroslav's example. Batu sent Yaroslav to the imperial court of Karakorum to assist at the inauguration of Güyük Khan in 1246. Plano Carpini, who got approval from Batu to go further, noted that the Great Khan's aunt was executed. At the same time Yaroslav was poisoned in Mongolia.

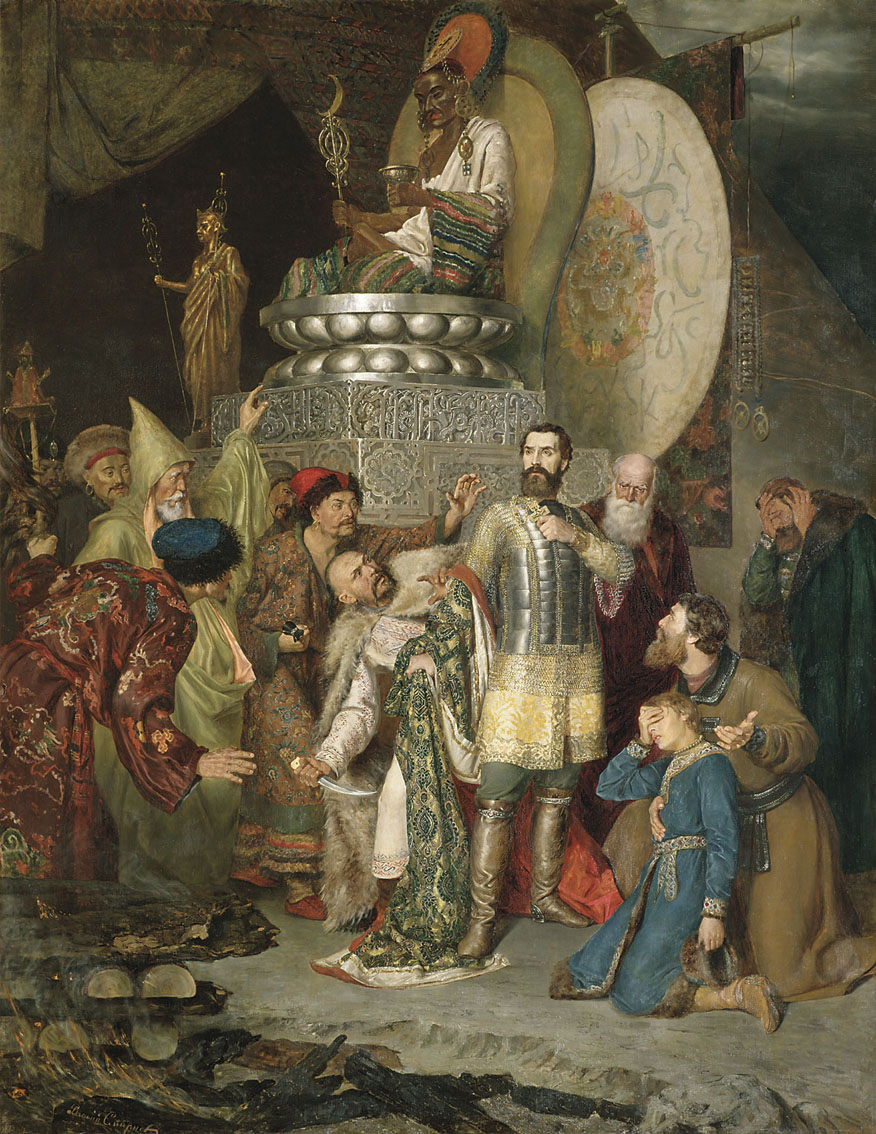
Prince Michael of Chernigov was passed between fires in accordance with ancient Turco-Mongol tradition. Batu Khan stabbed him to death for his refusal to do obeisance to Genghis Khan's shrine in the pagan ritual.

Batu had commissaries in the various towns where the dependent Rus' princes and other princes held their courts. The princes from Rus' principalities such as Vladimir Constantine, Boris, Gleb, Vasili, Constatantine, Vladimir Constantinovich, Vasil'ko and Sviatoslav Vsevolodovich of Vladimir, went to the court of Batu in person. When Michael of Chernigov, who had murdered the Mongol envoy in Kiev, arrived, the Mongol overseers were engaged in taking a census of the inhabitants for the poll tax. Michael was ordered to repair to Batu. When summoned before Batu, he was made to pass between two fires and ordered to prostrate himself before the tablets of Genghis Khan. According to the hagiographic vita written in praise of him decades later, Michael replied that he did not object to do obeisance to Batu himself, but to adore images of a dead man was repugnant. As he persisted in his refusal, Batu ordered his death.

Danylo of Halych was summoned to Batu in Sarai, and submitted himself to the Mongols, an act later decried in the Galician-Volhynian Chronicle, which otherwise glorified Danylo's exploits. Batu, addressing him, said "You have for a long time refused to come, but have effaced your ill conduct by your obedience" and saluted him with a draught of airag. They exchanged hostages whereby 100 families of Keraites were re-settled in Carpathian-Galicia. After the defeat of the Sultanate of Rum, Baiju freed David VII Ulu from Turkish imprisonment and sent him to Batu and Güyük. Fearing Baiju's aggressive policy, Queen Rusudan of Georgia sent her son David VI Narin to Batu's court to get official recognition as heir apparent. Batu supported David VI and granted him the rights above the Georgian and Armenian nobles and the Mongol tammachis. But Güyük made David Ulu the senior king of Georgia and ordered Batu's protege David Narin to be subordinate to David Ulu.

Suspicion between Batu and Güyük increased, and Güyük replaced the officials in Iran and the Caucasus with his own men, including Eljigidei. When Güyük began moving west, Sorghaghtani Beki, the widow of Tolui, warned Batu that he was actually the Great Khan's target. When Güyük summoned Batu to appear before him, Batu moved slowly. Before meeting Batu, Güyük died suddenly. According to William of Rubruck and a Muslim chronicle, one of Batu's brothers murdered or poisoned the Great Khan Güyük and Batu then killed the imperial envoy, though this account is not completely confirmed by other major sources.

== Möngke and Batu ==
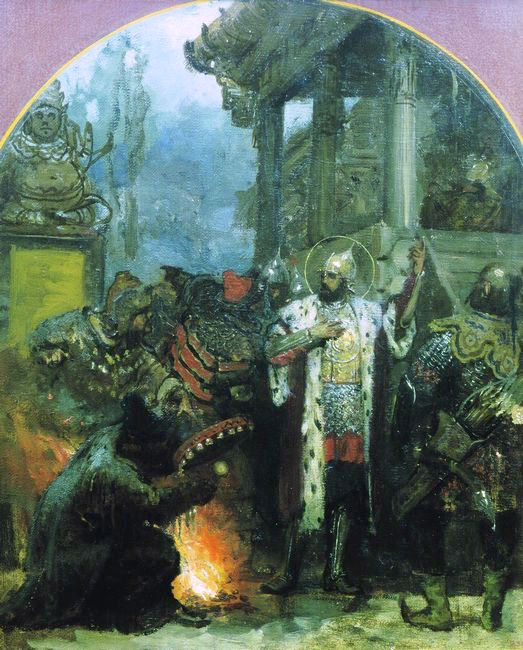
Batu's loyal vassal Alexander Nevsky in the Horde

An opportunity had arrived for deposing the House of Ögedei from the overlordship of the Mongols, and Batu was determined to avail himself of it. But Batu seemed to allow Oghul Qaimish to serve as regent. He also suggested unruly princes listen to her words. When Batu was ill, Möngke Khan went to the Ulus of Jochi to greet him as his mother Sorghagtani advised. Batu was much delighted on seeing him.

At last, Batu called a kurultai on his own territory in 1250. Members of the Ögedeid and Chagataid families refused to attend the kurultai beyond the Mongolian heartland. The kurultai offered the throne to Batu Khan who had no interest in promoting himself as the new Grand Khan. Rejecting it, he instead nominated Möngke, who led a Mongol army in Rus', the Northern Caucasus, and Hungary. The pro-Tolui faction rose up and supported his choice. Given its limited attendance and location, this kurultai was of questionable validity. Batu sent Möngke under the protection of his brothers, Berke and Tukhtemur, and his son Sartaq to assemble a formal kurultai at Kodoe Aral in the heartland. The supporters of Möngke invited Oghul Qaimish and other main Ögedeid and Chagataid princes to attend the kurultai, but they refused each time, demanding descendants of Ögedei must be khan. In response, Batu accused them of killing his aunt Altalaun and defying Ögedei's nominee, Shiremun. After the assembled throng proclaimed Möngke Great Khan of the Mongol Empire in 1251, he punished the Ögedeid and Chagataid families for the organized plot against him. Möngke sent Buri to Batu who had him executed by Buri's opponent general. Eljigidei was also ordered to be executed.

Grand prince Andrey II of Vladimir allied with the rebellious-minded princes of western Rus', giving umbrage to the Mongols. Batu sent a punitive expedition under Nevrui. On their approach, Andrey fled to Pskov and thence to Sweden. The Mongols spread over Vladimir and harshly punished the people there. The Livonian Knights stopped their advance to Novgorod and Pskov on hearing the news about the Mongols. Thanks to his friendship with Sartaq, Alexander was installed as the grand prince of Vladimir by Batu in 1252. In 1256 Andrey travelled to Sarai to ask pardon for his former infidelity and was shown mercy.

During the reign of Möngke, Batu's prestige as kingmaker and viceroy of the great khans in the west reached its height. Even so, Batu allowed Möngke's census takers to operate freely in his realm. According to a Muslim chronicle and the History of Yuan, Batu had free access to the imperial treasury. Of all the grandsons of Genghis Khan, he and Möngke seemed most capable and the most dedicated to following the spirit of Mongol law.

Batu dispatched a large Jochid delegation to participate in Hulagu's expedition in the Middle East. However, Berke's persuasion might have forced him to delay to strengthen Hulagu's force, little suspecting that it would result in eliminating the Jochid predominance there, for few years.

Batu, Möngke, and other princely lines shared rule over the area from Afghanistan to Turkey. Batu left the affairs of state to his son, Sartaq, before dying in 1255.

== Family and legacy ==
Batu Khan was approximately five feet and seven inches tall (1.70 m), and had at least four children:

- Sartaq, khan of the Golden Horde from 1255 to 1256, son of Batu Khan and Boraqchin
- Toqoqan
- Andewan
- Ulagchi – probably the son of Sartaq often named Ju Lai (Dzhulaibek)

Batu's mother Ukhaa ujin belonged to the Mongol Onggirat clan while his chief khatun Boraqchin was an Alchi-Tatar.

When Batu and his son Sartaq died, after a brief regency of Boraqchin for Ulagchi, Batu's brother Berke inherited the Golden Horde. Berke was not inclined to unity with his cousins in the Mongol family, making war on Hulagu Khan, though Berke officially recognized Möngke and the Empire of the Great Khan as his overlords. In fact, Berke was an independent ruler by then. Berke did not share Batu's interest in conquering it, however, he demanded Hungarian King Béla IV's submission and sent his general Borolday to Lithuania and Poland.

The Kipchak Khanate was known in Rus and Europe as the Golden Horde (Zolotaya Orda) some think because of the golden colour of the Khan's tent. "Horde" comes from the Mongol word "orda/ordu" or camp. "Golden" is thought to have had a similar meaning to "royal" (Royal Camp). Of all the Khanates, the Golden Horde ruled longest. Long after the expulsion of the Yuan dynasty from China to Mongolia, and the fall of Ilkhanate in Middle East, the descendants of Batu Khan continued to rule the steppes in what is now Ukraine, Russia, and Kazakhstan. Batu's line ruled the Jochid Ulus until 1360, a century after Berke's death in 1264. Descendants of his brothers, Orda and Tuqatimur, took the throne of the Golden Horde afterwards.

== Ancestry ==
Ancestors of Batu Khan

8. Yesugei
4. Genghis Khan, Mongol Emperor
9. Hoelun
2. Jochi
10. Dei Sechen of the Qongirat (= 12)
5. Börte
11. Chotan (= 13)
1. Batu Khan, Khan of the Golden Horde
12. Dei Sechen of the Qongirat (= 10)
6. Alchi
13. Chotan (= 11)
3. Ukhaa Ujin

== See also ==
- List of Khans of the Golden Horde
- The Mongol Invasion (trilogy)

== Bibliography ==
=== Literature ===
- Grousset, René (1938). L'Empire des Steppes.
- Morgan, David (1991). The Mongols. Wiley. ISBN 0-631-17563-6.
- Nicolle, David (1998). The Mongol Warlords. Brockhampton Press.
- Rockhill, William Woodville (1967), The Journey of William of Rubruck to The Eastern Parts of the World, 1253–55, As Narrated by Himself, With Two Accounts of the Earlier Journey of John of Pian de Carpine.
- Ronay, Gabriel (1978). The Tartar Khan's Englishman. Cassell. ISBN 0-304-30054-3.
- Saunders, J. J. (1971). The History of the Mongol Conquests. Routledge & Kegan Paul. ISBN 0-8122-1766-7.
- Sicker, Martin (2000). The Islamic World in Ascendancy: From the Arab Conquests to the Siege of Vienna. Praeger Publishers.
- Soucek, Svatopluk (2000). A History of Inner Asia. Cambridge.
- Yan, Vasily (2007). Baty. Azbuka Clasica.

Batu Khan House of Borjigin (1206–1634) Died: 1255
Regnal titles
Preceded by Jochi	Khan of the Golden Horde; 1227–1255	Succeeded by Sartaq
Preceded by Jochi	Khan of the Blue Horde; 1240–1255	Succeeded by Sartaq
