= Timeline of the Golden Horde =

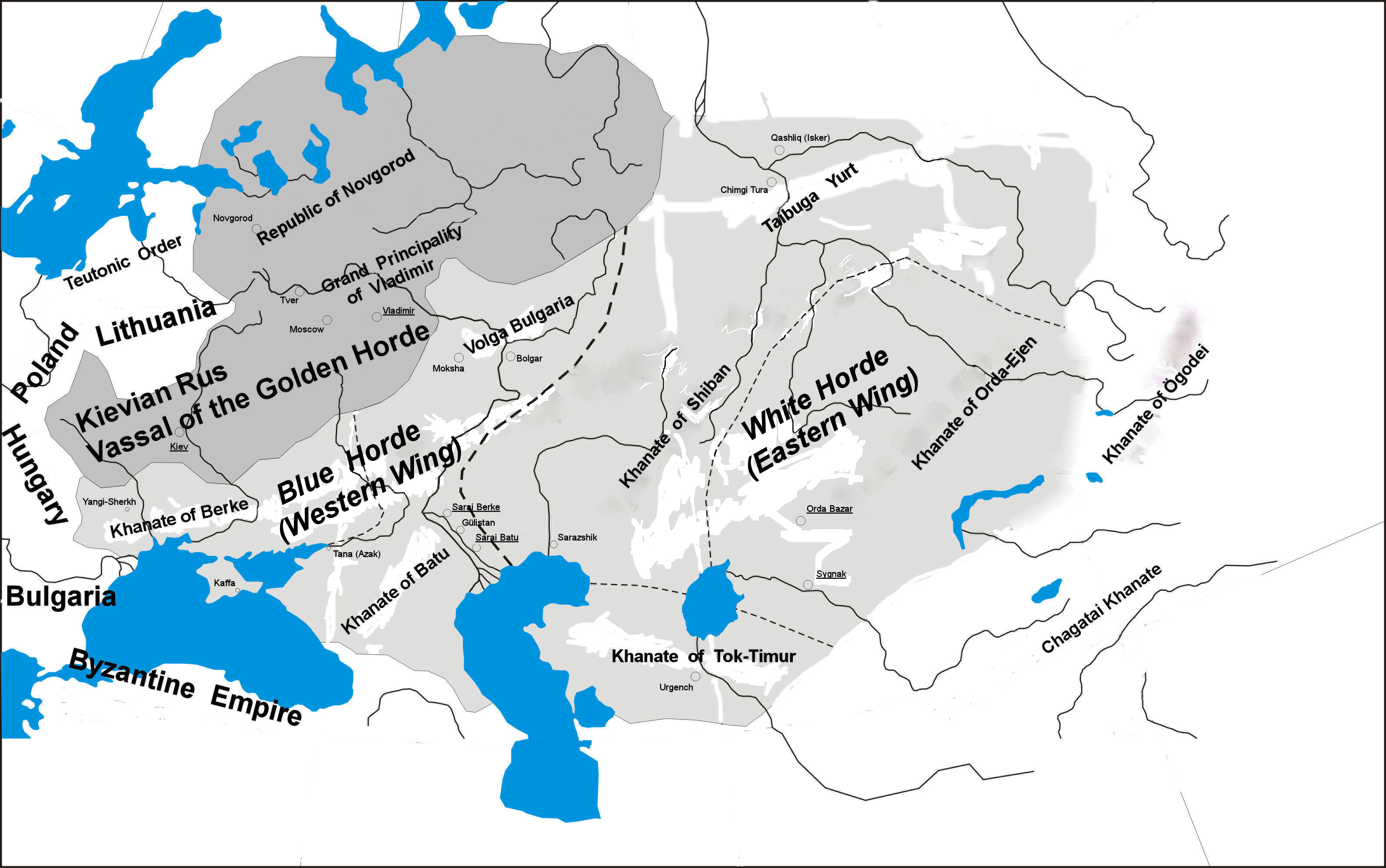
The Golden Horde as it was governed under the dual khanship of the Western and Eastern Wings. When the Golden Horde was founded, it was jointly ruled by two separate wings. The right wing in the west was ruled by Batu Khan and his descendants. The left wing in the east, also known as the "Blue Horde" by the Russians or the "White Horde" by the Timurids, was ruled by four Jochid khans under Orda Khan.

This is a timeline of events involving the Golden Horde (1242–1502), from the 1430s also known as the Great Horde.

== 13th century ==
For pre-1242 events involving Mongols in Europe, see Timeline of the Mongol Empire § 13th century

=== 1240s ===
Year	Date	Event
1242		Mongol invasion of Europe: Mongol Empire forces the Second Bulgarian Empire to pay tribute
1242	spring	Mongol invasion of Europe: Mongol forces retreat after receiving news of Ögedei Khan's death; Batu Khan stays at the Volga River and his brother Orda Khan returns to Mongolia
1242		The Golden Horde stretches from the Chu River to the Danube
1242		Yaroslav II of Vladimir visits Sarai and submits to Batu Khan for confirmation of his office
1245	December	Daniel of Galicia visits Sarai and submits to Batu Khan for confirmation of his office
1245		Golden Horde carries out census of Ruthenian lands
1246	20 September	Michael of Chernigov visits Sarai, but refuses to (fully) submit to Batu Khan and is executed
1246		Yaroslav II of Vladimir is poisoned by Oghul Qaimish in Karakorum and dies
1248	20 April	Güyük Khan dies on his way to confront Batu Khan and his wife Oghul Qaimish becomes regent

=== 1250s ===
Year	Date	Event
1251		Möngke Khan grants Berke Georgia
1255		Batu Khan constructs Sarai
1255		Batu Khan dies and is succeeded by his son Sartaq Khan, who dies soon after, and then Ulaghchi
1256		Daniel of Galicia expels Mongol garrisons from his territory
1256		Golden Horde carries out census of Ruthenian lands
1257		Ulaghchi dies and Berke, a Muslim, succeeds him
1258/9	winter	In the Novgorod Republic, Alexander Nevsky and Golden Horde troops suppress non-violent civilian opposition to tribute
1259		Second Mongol invasion of Poland: Berke and Boroldai invade Poland and Daniel of Galicia flees, however his sons and brother Vasilko of Galicia join the Mongols to plunder Lithuania and Polish territories
1259		Golden Horde elements in Bukhara rebel and Alghu suppresses them

=== 1260s ===
Year	Date	Event
1260	2 February	Sack of Sandomierz (1260): Berke and Boroldai sack Sandomierz
1260		Toluid Civil War: Berke of the Golden Horde allies with Ariq Böke and declares war on Hulagu Khan
1262		Berke–Hulagu war: Berke of the Golden Horde allies with the Mamluks and invades Azerbaijan
1262		Suzdal rebels and is defeated
1263	13 January	Berke–Hulagu war: Berke defeats Hulagu Khan's army on the Terek River
1263/1264		Mongol invasion of Byzantine Thrace: Berke forces attack Thrace and secure the release of Kaykaus II
1266	summer	Berke dies in Tbilisi and is succeeded by his grandnephew Mengu-Timur
1266		Byzantine–Mongol alliance: Michael VIII Palaiologos marries Euphrosyne Palaiologina to Nogai Khan
1267		Mengu-Timur grants Genoa Caffa
1269		Ghiyas-ud-din Baraq is defeated by the Golden Horde and loses a third of Transoxiana
1269		Golden Horde assists Vladimir-Suzdal in evicting the Germans from Narva

=== 1270s ===
Year	Date	Event
1273		Golden Horde carries out census of Ruthenian lands
1273		Byzantine–Mongol alliance: Nogai Khan assists the Byzantines against Bulgaria
1279		Byzantine–Mongol alliance: Nogai Khan assists the Byzantines against Bulgaria

=== 1280s ===
Year	Date	Event
1280		Mengu-Timur dies and his brother Tode Mongke succeeds him
1280		George I of Bulgaria submits to the Golden Horde
1282		Byzantine–Mongol alliance: Nogai Khan sends forces to Byzantium to assist them against Thessaly
1283		Tode Mongke converts to Islam and starts neglecting state affairs and as a result Köchü and Nogai Khan increase their influence
1284		Golden Horde invades Bulgaria and annexes Isaccea
1285		Second Mongol invasion of Hungary: Golden Horde invades Hungary and reaches as far as Pest before being defeated and forced to retreat
1287	6 December	Third Mongol invasion of Poland: Golden Horde invades Poland
1287		Tode Mongke is slain by Talabuga who becomes khan
1288	February	Third Mongol invasion of Poland: Mongol forces are defeated and forced to retreat
1289		Rostov rebels and is defeated

=== 1290s ===
Year	Date	Event
1291		Mengu-Timur's fifth son Toqta flees to the Ilkhanate which helps him seize the throne
1291		Serbian conflict with the Nogai Horde: Serbia submits to the Golden Horde
1293		Golden Horde sacks Sandomierz
1295		Golden Horde invades Bulgaria
1296		Nogai Khan rebels against Toqta
1298		Nogai Khan sacks Caffa
1299		Toqta defeats Nogai Khan

== 14th century ==
=== 1300s ===
Year	Date	Event
1300		Chaka, son of Nogai Khan, is murdered by Theodore Svetoslav of Bulgaria to appease Toqta
1305		Golden Horde raids Leles
1308		Toqta sacks Caffa

=== 1310s ===
Year	Date	Event
1312		Toqta dies
1313		Toqta's nephew Öz Beg Khan seizes the throne, prohibits Buddhism among the elite, and applies Islamization among the Mongols.
1318		Öz Beg Khan attacks the Ilkhanate

=== 1320s ===
Year	Date	Event
1320		Mubarak Khwaja of the White Horde converts to Islam
1320		Golden Horde attacks Thrace
1321		Golden Horde attacks Thrace
1324		Öz Beg Khan attacks Thrace and the Ilkhanate
1326		Golden Horde raids Hungary
1327		Tver Uprising of 1327: citizens of the Principality of Tver rebelled against the Golden Horde. The Golden Horde and its Muscovite and Suzdalian allies organised a punitive expedition to the Tver principality and put the revolt down.

=== 1330s ===
Year	Date	Event
1330		Basarab I of Wallachia allies with the Golden Horde
1335		Öz Beg Khan attacks the Ilkhanate
1338		Golden Horde is ravaged by the Black Death
1339		Golden Horde starts receiving 24,000 ding of paper currency annually from the Yuan dynasty

=== 1340s ===
Year	Date	Event
1340		Golden Horde sacks Sandomierz
1341		Öz Beg Khan dies and is succeeded by his son Tini Beg
1342		Tini Beg is overthrown by his brother Jani Beg
1345		Hungary attacks the Golden Horde
1346		Hungary forces the Golden Horde back to the Black Sea coasts
1347		Siege of Caffa: The Genoese possession of Caffa, a great trade emporium on the Crimean Peninsula, came under siege by an army of Mongol warriors under the command of Janibeg. An epidemic of bubonic plague had been ravaging Central Asia before the conflict in Caffa. Brought across the Silk Road, the Mongols used disease-infected corpses as a biological weapon. The corpses were catapulted over the city walls, infecting the inhabitants.

=== 1350s ===
Year	Date	Event
1352	March	Golden Horde and Ruthenian allies attack Poland and capture Lublin
1357		Jani Beg is overthrown by his son Berdi Beg
1359		Berdi Beg is overthrown by his brother Qulpa. Beginning of the Great Troubles.

=== 1360s ===
Year	Date	Event
1360		Qulpa is overthrown by his brother Nawruz Beg and the Blue Horde rebels and seizes power in Sarai
1361		Nawruz Beg is overthrown by Khidr Khan ibn Sasibuqa Khan
1362		Mamai sets up puppet khans and rules from the Sea of Azov
1363		Battle of Blue Waters: Grand Duchy of Lithuania defeats the Golden Horde and vassalizes Ruthenian princes in the Dnieper region

=== 1370s ===
Year	Date	Event
1373		Urus Khan overthrows the lineage of Khidr Khan ibn Sasibuqa Khan
1376		Tokhtamysh takes Sarai.
1378	11 August	Battle of the Vozha River: Dmitry Donskoy defeats a Mongol detachment
1378		Tokhtamysh overthrows the lineage of Urus Khan and leads the Turkic Blue Horde west

=== 1380s ===
Year	Date	Event
1380		Golden Horde starts passing decrees in Turkish language
1380	8 September	Battle of Kulikovo: A largely Muscovite army led by Dmitri Donskoi defeated Mongol warlord Mamai in a pyrrhic victory at Kulikovo field. Mamai's Tverian allies never showed up, his Lithuanian and Riazani allies arrived too late to take part, but did harass the victorious Muscovite troops as they returned to Moscow.
1381		Battle of the Kalka River (1381): Tokhtamysh defeated Mamai, becoming the undisputed khan of the Golden Horde, and ending the war of succession that had been raging ever since 1359.
1382	26 August	Siege of Moscow (1382): khan Tokhtamysh of the Golden Horde and his allied Rus' princes of Tver, Riazan, and Nizhniy Novgorod besieged and sacked Moscow. The princes of Nizhniy Novgorod tricked the Muscovite citizens into surrendering the city, after which Moscow was immediately sacked. Thereafter, Tokhtamysh' troops sacked surrounding towns including Serpukhov, Pereyaslavl, and Kolomna, and on their way home southwards also the principality of Riazan.
1383		Tokhtamysh defeats the Lithuanians at Poltava
1387		Golden Horde loses control of the Black Sea coast

=== 1390s ===
Year	Date	Event
1391	18 June	Battle of the Kondurcha River: Timur attacked the Golden Horde and defeats Tokhtamysh
1395	15 April	Battle of the Terek River: Timur sacked New Sarai and Tokhtamysh was overthrown; Edigu seized power and set up Temür Qutlugh as puppet khan
1397		Tokhtamysh fled to Lithuania, where Vytautas allowed him to stay at Vilnius
1399	12 August	Battle of the Vorskla River: Temür Qutlugh of the Golden Horde and Mongol warlord Edigu defeated the forces of grand prince Vytautas of Lithuania, Mongol warlord Tokhtamysh, and their allies. Tokhtamysh was forced to flee.

== 15th century ==
=== 1400s ===
Year	Date	Event
1405		Tokhtamysh is killed by Shadi Beg's troops.
1408		Edigu attacked Moscow and extracted a ransom before retreating.
1408		The Nogai Horde emerges under Taibuga

=== 1410s ===
Year	Date	Event
1411		The Golden Horde starts splintering; effective end of the Golden Horde
1412		Jalal al-Din Khan ibn Tokhtamysh reclaims the Golden Horde with Lithuanian support
1413		Jalal al-Din Khan ibn Tokhtamysh is murdered by his brother Karim Berdi
1418		Yeremferden seizes control of the Golden Horde

=== 1420s ===
Year	Date	Event
1428		The Uzbek Khanate emerges under Abu'l-Khayr Khan

=== 1430s ===
Year	Date	Event
1430		The Great Horde emerges

=== 1440s ===
Year	Date	Event
1445		The Khanate of Kazan emerges under Ulugh Muhammad
1449		The Crimean Khanate emerges under Hacı I Giray

=== 1450s ===
Year	Date	Event
1453		The Qasim Khanate emerges under Qasim Khan
1458		The Kazakh Khanate emerges under Janibek Khan and Kerei

=== 1460s ===
Year	Date	Event
1466		The Astrakhan Khanate emerges under Mahmud bin Küchük's descendants

=== 1470s ===
Year	Date	Event
1474		Ahmed Khan bin Küchük commands the Grand Duchy of Moscow to give tribute but is denied
1476		Ivan III of Moscow refuses to pay tribute to the Golden Horde

=== 1480s ===
Year	Date	Event
1480	8 October – 28 November	Great Stand on the Ugra River: armies of Muscovy and the Great Horde confronted each other without fighting and then simultaneously retreated. Although long hailed as the "end of the Tatar yoke" in traditional Russian historiography, the event changed little in Muscovite–Horde relations.

== 16th century ==
Year	Date	Event
1502		The Crimean Khanate destroys the Great Horde

== Gallery ==
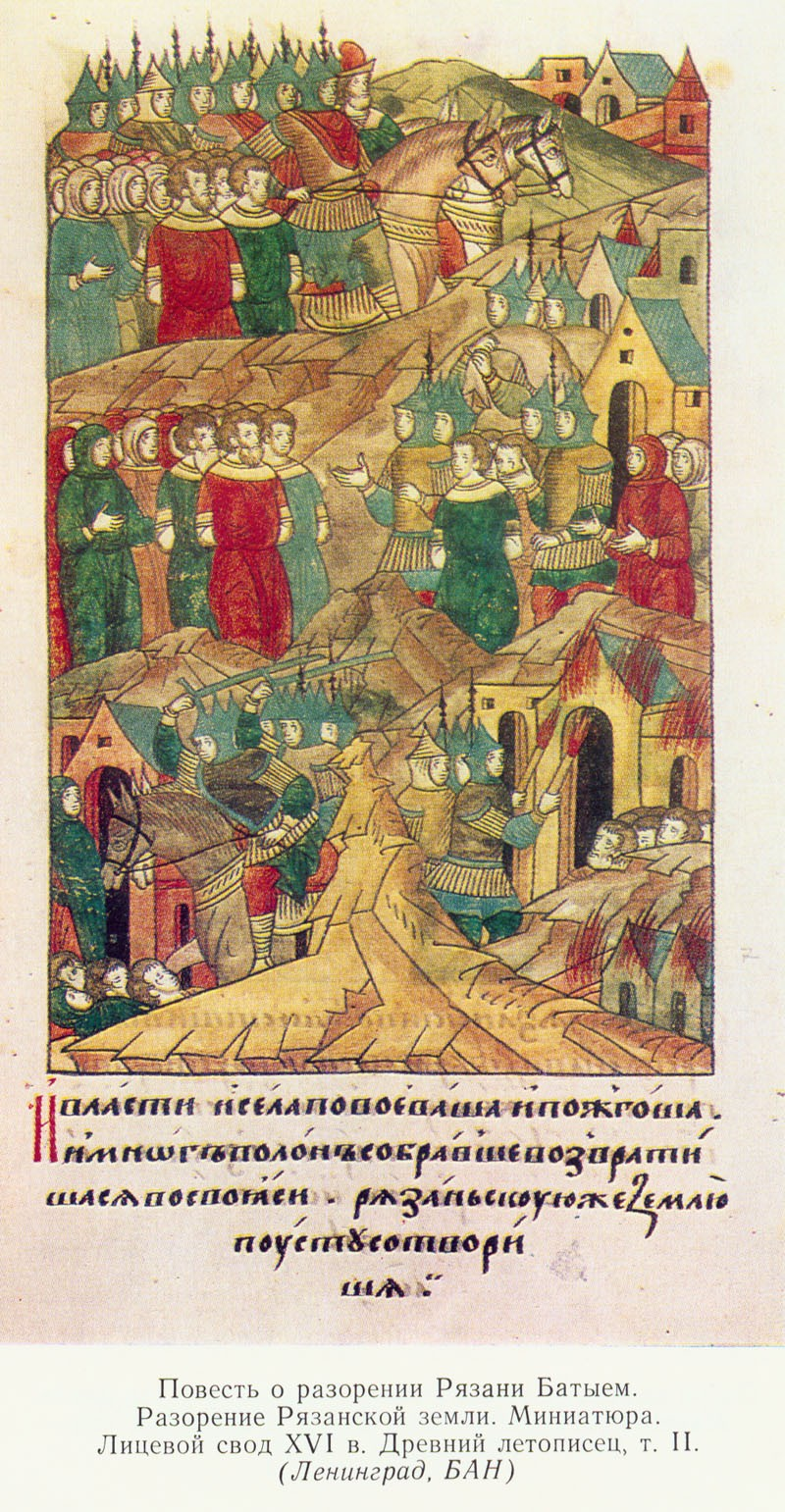
Golden Horde raid at Ryazan

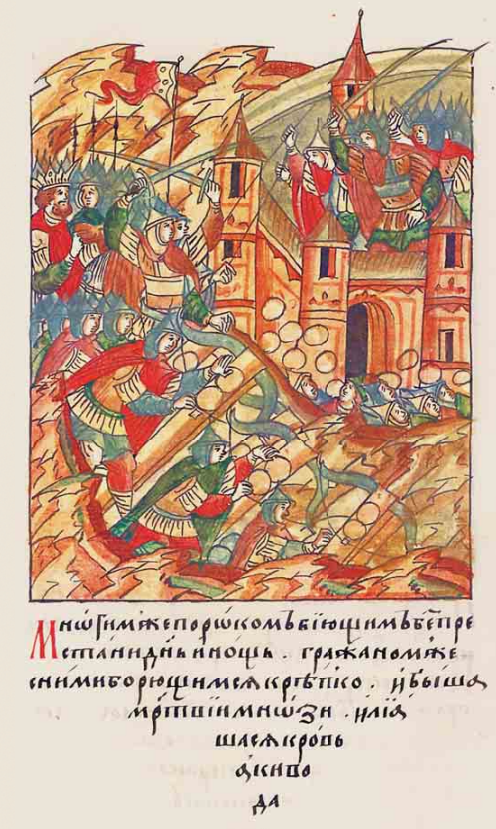
Golden Horde raid at Kyev

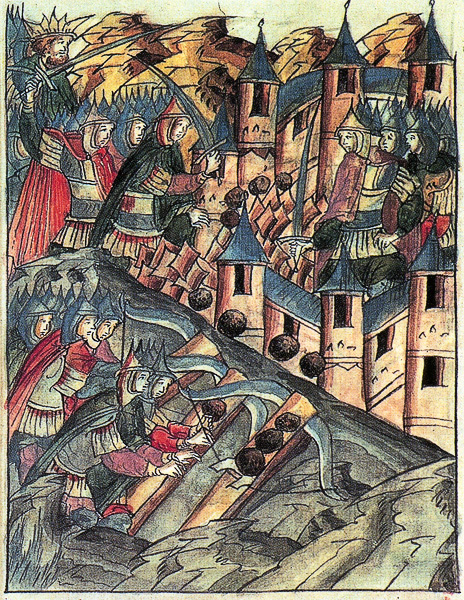
Golden Horde raid at Kozelsk

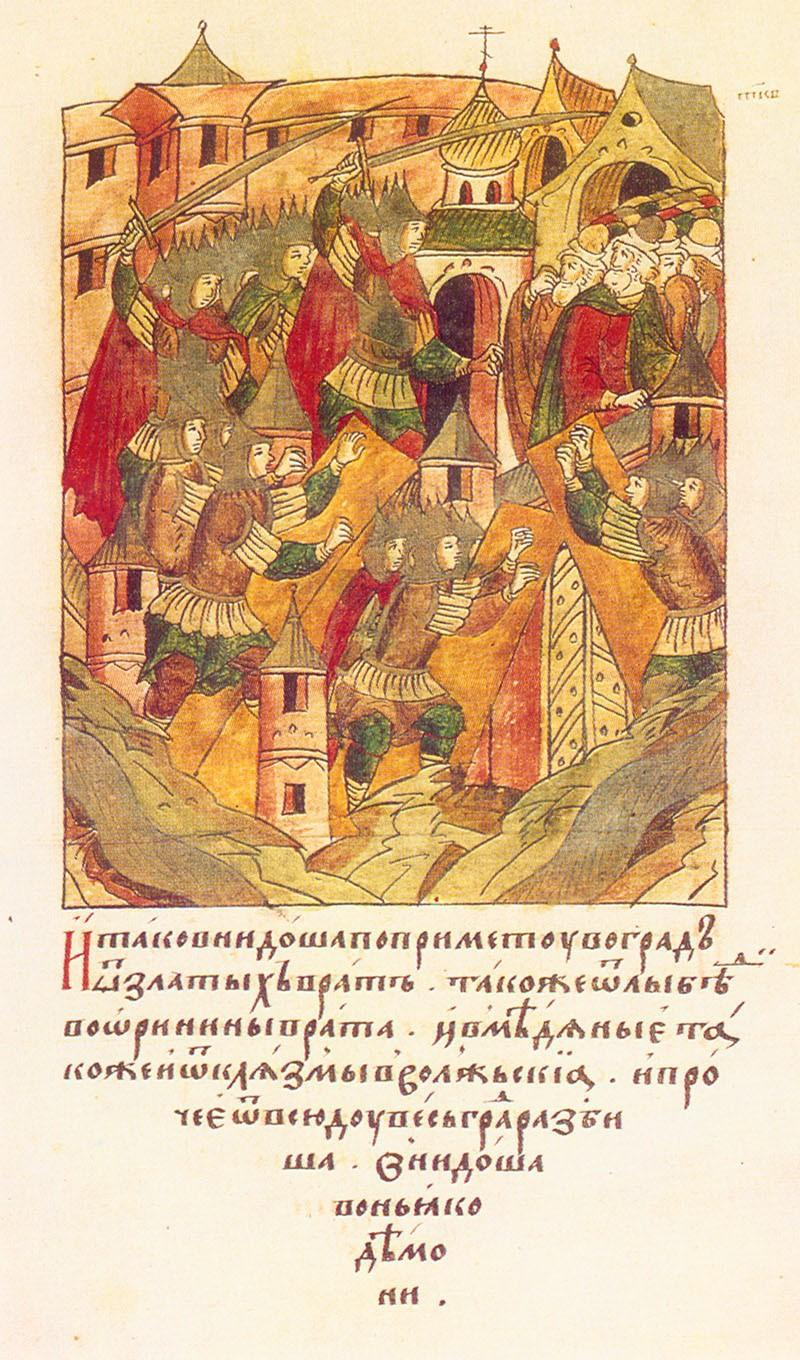
Golden Horde raid Vladimir

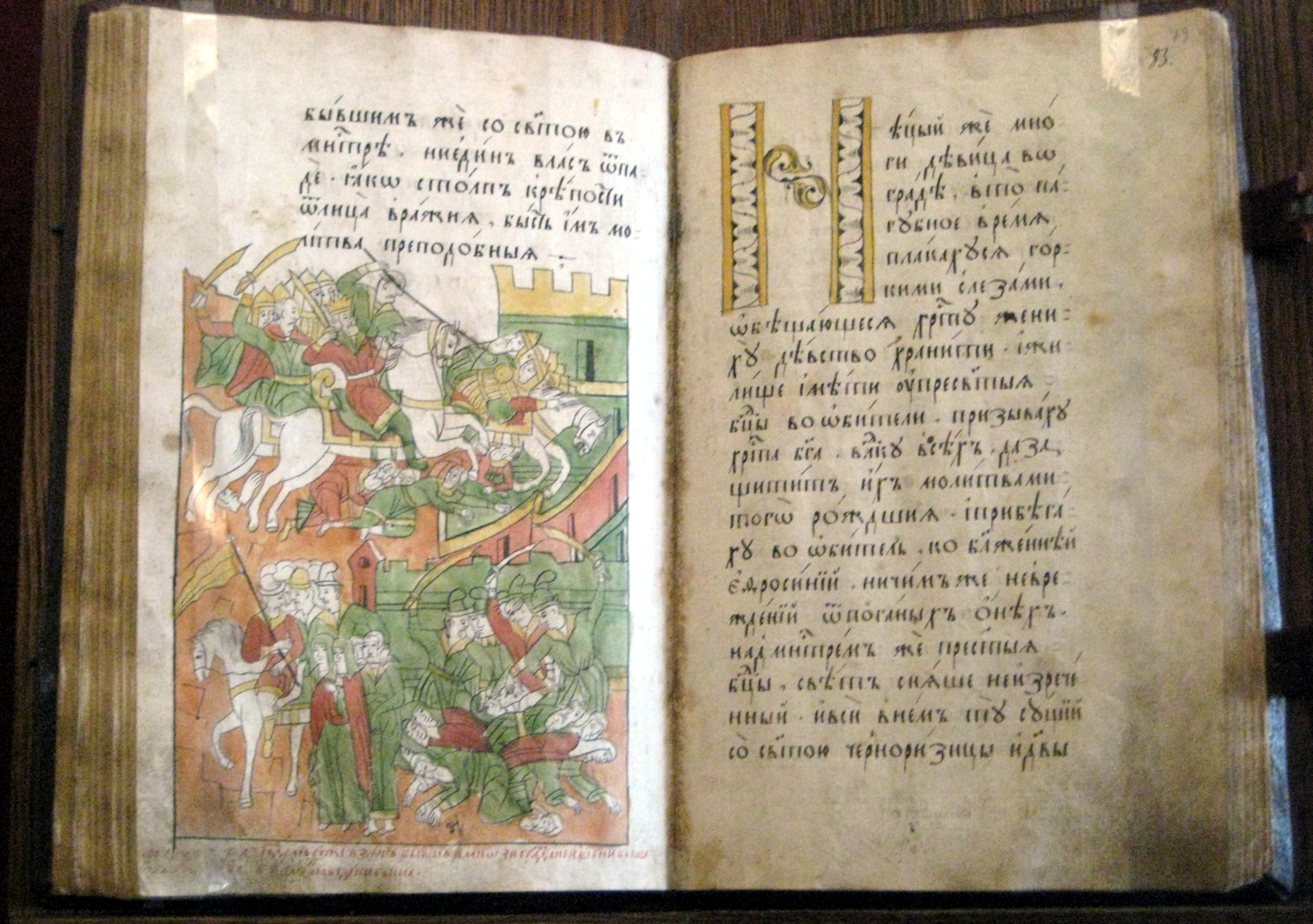
Golden Horde raid Suzdal

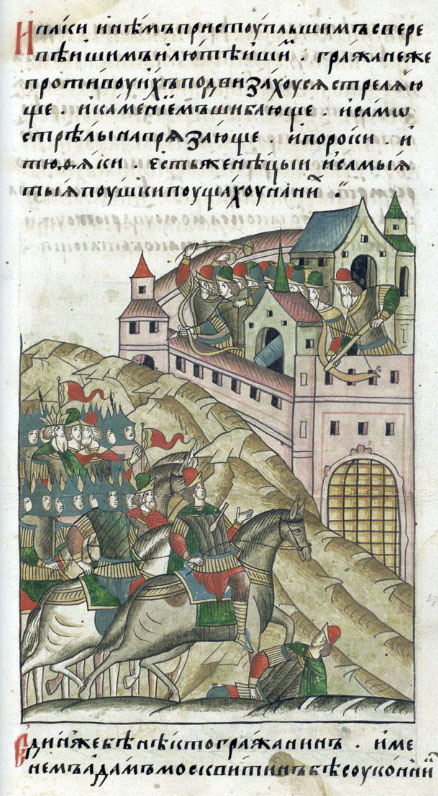
Tokhtamysh besieges Moscow

== See also ==
- List of wars and battles involving the Golden Horde, including the Great Horde (1242–1502)
- Kiev in the Golden Horde period
- Timeline of the Yuan dynasty
- Timeline of the Ilkhanate
- Timeline of the Chagatai Khanate
- Timeline of Mongolian history
- Timeline of Mongols prior to the Mongol Empire

== Bibliography ==
- Andrade, Tonio (2016), The Gunpowder Age: China, Military Innovation, and the Rise of the West in World History, Princeton University Press, ISBN 978-0-691-13597-7.
- Asimov, M.S. (1998), History of civilizations of Central Asia Volume IV The age of achievement: A.D. 750 to the end of the fifteenth century Part One The historical, social and economic setting, UNESCO Publishing
- Atwood, Christopher P. (2004), Encyclopedia of Mongolia and the Mongol Empire, Facts On File
- Barfield, Thomas (1989), The Perilous Frontier: Nomadic Empires and China, Basil Blackwell
- Barrett, Timothy Hugh (2008), The Woman Who Discovered Printing, Great Britain: Yale University Press, ISBN 978-0-300-12728-7 (alk. paper)
- Beckwith, Christopher I. (2009), Empires of the Silk Road: A History of Central Eurasia from the Bronze Age to the Present, Princeton University Press, ISBN 978-0-691-13589-2
- Beckwith, Christopher I (1987), The Tibetan Empire in Central Asia: A History of the Struggle for Great Power among Tibetans, Turks, Arabs, and Chinese during the Early Middle Ages, Princeton University Press
- Biran, Michal (2005), The Empire of the Qara Khitai in Eurasian History: Between China and the Islamic World, Cambridge Studies in Islamic Civilization, Cambridge, England: Cambridge University Press, ISBN 0521842263
- Bregel, Yuri (2003), An Historical Atlas of Central Asia, Brill
- Christian, David (2018), A History of Russia, Central Asia and Mongolia 2, Wiley Blackwell
- Cosmo, Nicola di (2009), The Cambridge History of Inner Asia: The Chinggisid Age, Cambridge University Press
- Crummey, Robert O. (2014). The Formation of Muscovy 1300 – 1613. Routledge. pp. 52–62. ISBN 9781317872009. (originally published in 1987).
- Drompp, Michael Robert (2005), Tang China And The Collapse Of The Uighur Empire: A Documentary History, Brill
- Ebrey, Patricia Buckley (1999), The Cambridge Illustrated History of China, Cambridge: Cambridge University Press, ISBN 0-521-66991-X (paperback).
- Ebrey, Patricia Buckley; Walthall, Anne; Palais, James B. (2006), East Asia: A Cultural, Social, and Political History, Boston: Houghton Mifflin, ISBN 0-618-13384-4
- Golden, Peter B. (1992), An Introduction to the History of the Turkic Peoples: Ethnogenesis and State-Formation in Medieval and Early Modern Eurasia and the Middle East, OTTO HARRASSOWITZ · WIESBADEN
- Graff, David A. (2002), Medieval Chinese Warfare, 300-900, Warfare and History, London: Routledge, ISBN 0415239559
- Graff, David Andrew (2016), The Eurasian Way of War Military Practice in Seventh-Century China and Byzantium, Routledge, ISBN 978-0-415-46034-7.
- Grousset, Rene (1970), Empire of the Steppes, Rutgers University Press
- Halperin, Charles J. (1987). Russia and the Golden Horde: The Mongol Impact on Medieval Russian History. Indiana University. p. 222. ISBN 9781850430575. (e-book).
- Haywood, John (1998), Historical Atlas of the Medieval World, AD 600-1492, Barnes & Noble
- Jackson, Peter (2005), The Mongols and the West, Pearson Education Limited
- Latourette, Kenneth Scott (1964), The Chinese, their history and culture, Volumes 1-2, Macmillan
- Lorge, Peter A. (2008), The Asian Military Revolution: from Gunpowder to the Bomb, Cambridge University Press, ISBN 978-0-521-60954-8
- Luttwak, Edward N. (2009), The Grand Strategy of the Byzantine Empire, The Belknap Press of Harvard University Press
- Millward, James (2009), Eurasian Crossroads: A History of Xinjiang, Columbia University Press
- Mote, F. W. (2003), Imperial China: 900–1800, Harvard University Press, ISBN 978-0674012127
- Needham, Joseph (1986), Science & Civilisation in China, vol. V:7: The Gunpowder Epic, Cambridge University Press, ISBN 0-521-30358-3
- Nicol, Donald M. (1993), The Last Centuries of Byzantium, 1261-1453, Cambridge University Press, ISBN 9780521439916
- Rong, Xinjiang (2013), Eighteen Lectures on Dunhuang, Brill
- Schafer, Edward H. (1985), The Golden Peaches of Samarkand: A study of T'ang Exotics, University of California Press
- Shaban, M. A. (1979), The ʿAbbāsid Revolution, Cambridge: Cambridge University Press, ISBN 0-521-29534-3
- Shaikhutdinov, Marat (23 November 2021). "3.4 Invasion of Tokhtamysh". Between East and West: The Formation of the Moscow State. Academic Studies Press. pp. 104–107. ISBN 9781644697153.
- Sinor, Denis (1990), The Cambridge History of Early Inner Asia, Volume 1, Cambridge University Press
- Sima, Guang (2015), Bóyángbǎn Zīzhìtōngjiàn 54 huánghòu shīzōng 柏楊版資治通鑑54皇后失蹤, Yuǎnliú chūbǎnshìyè gǔfèn yǒuxiàn gōngsī, ISBN 978-957-32-0876-1
- Skaff, Jonathan Karam (2012), Sui-Tang China and Its Turko-Mongol Neighbors: Culture, Power, and Connections, 580-800 (Oxford Studies in Early Empires), Oxford University Press
- Standen, Naomi (2007), Unbounded Loyalty Frontier Crossings in Liao China, University of Hawai'i Press
- Steinhardt, Nancy Shatzman (1997), Liao Architecture, University of Hawaii Press
- Twitchett, Denis C. (1979), The Cambridge History of China, Vol. 3, Sui and T'ang China, 589–906, Cambridge University Press
- Twitchett, Denis (1994), "The Liao", The Cambridge History of China, Volume 6, Alien Regime and Border States, 907-1368, Cambridge: Cambridge University Press, pp. 43–153, ISBN 0521243319
- Twitchett, Denis (2009), The Cambridge History of China Volume 5 The Sung dynasty and its Predecessors, 907-1279, Cambridge University Press
- Vernadsky, George (1953), The Mongols and Russia, Yale University Press
- Wang, Zhenping (2013), Tang China in Multi-Polar Asia: A History of Diplomacy and War, University of Hawaii Press
- Wilkinson, Endymion (2015). Chinese History: A New Manual, 4th edition. Cambridge, MA: Harvard University Asia Center distributed by Harvard University Press. ISBN 9780674088467.
- Xiong, Victor Cunrui (2000), Sui-Tang Chang'an: A Study in the Urban History of Late Medieval China (Michigan Monographs in Chinese Studies), U OF M CENTER FOR CHINESE STUDIES, ISBN 0892641371
- Xiong, Victor Cunrui (2009), Historical Dictionary of Medieval China, United States of America: Scarecrow Press, Inc., ISBN 978-0810860537
- Xu, Elina-Qian (2005), HISTORICAL DEVELOPMENT OF THE PRE-DYNASTIC KHITAN, Institute for Asian and African Studies 7
- Xue, Zongzheng (1992), Turkic peoples, 中国社会科学出版社
- Yuan, Shu (2001), Bóyángbǎn Tōngjiàn jìshìběnmò 28 dìèrcìhuànguánshídài 柏楊版通鑑記事本末28第二次宦官時代, Yuǎnliú chūbǎnshìyè gǔfèn yǒuxiàn gōngsī, ISBN 957-32-4273-7
- Yule, Henry (1915), Cathay and the Way Thither: Being a Collection of Medieval Notices of China, Vol I: Preliminary Essay on the Intercourse Between China and the Western Nations Previous to the Discovery of the Cape Route, Hakluyt Society
