= Bengü (name) =

- Gender: Female

Origin
- Language: Turkish
- Meaning: Eternal, immortal

Other names
- Related names: Bengi, Mengü, Mengi

Bengü is a common Turkish given name. It means "eternal", "endless", "never-ending", or "immortal".

== People ==
=== Given name ===
- Bengü Erden, Turkish pop music singer
