= Mongke (disambiguation) =

Mongke (also Mönkh, Monkh, Munkh) means "eternal" in Mongolian language and may refer to:

== Peoples ==
=== Medieval ===
- Möngke Khan (1209–1259), Great khan of the Mongol Empire
- Yesü Möngke, khan of Chagatai khanate, 1247–1252
- Mengu-Timur (d. 1282), also known as Mongke Temur, khan of the Golden Horde, 1267–1280
- Tuda-Mengu, also known as Tode Mongke, khan of the Golden Horde from 1280 to 1287
- Möngke Temür, also known as Mengtemu, chieftain of the Jianzhou Jurchen 1405–1433
- Batumöngke Dayan Khan, khan of the Northern Yuan Dynasty 1479–1517

=== Modern ===
- Mengke Bateer, Chinese professional basketball player, formerly in the NBA.
- Uranchimegiin Mönkh-Erdene, amateur boxer from Mongolia
- Mönkhbaataryn Bundmaa, judoka for Mongolia

== Geographic and populated places ==
- Mount Mönkh Saridag, mountain located in Mongolian-Russian border.
- Mount Mönkhkhairkhan, mountain in Mongolia.
- Mönkhkhairkhan, Khovd, district of Khovd Province

== See also ==
- Mengü, the Turkic equivalent
- Mengi, the Turkic equivalent
