= Benjy (disambiguation) =

Benjy may refer to:

== People ==
- Benjyfishy (born 2004), British esports player
- Benjy F. Brooks (1918–1998), American pediatric surgeon
- Benjy Dial (1943–2001), American professional football player
- Benjy Ferree (born 1974), American singer-songwriter

== Bands ==
- Benjy Davis Project, American band

== Places ==
- Benjys, British chain of sandwich shops
- Benjy's, American restaurant serving American cuisine

== Film ==
- Benjy (film)

== See also ==
- Bengi
