= Bengi =

- Gender: Female

Origin
- Language: Turkish
- Meaning: eternal, immortal

Other names
- Related names: Bengü, Mengü, Mengi

Bengi is a Turkish given name which means "eternal", "endless", "never-ending", or "immortal". It is an Oghuz accented version of Bengü which is also a Turkish given name. Compared to Bengü, Bengi has an additional meaning: "a mythical water which gives a person immortal life".

Notable people with the name include:

- Bengi Yıldız (born 1965), Member of Parliament of the Peace and Democracy Party (BDP) for Batman, Turkey
- Bengi Ali of Karaman (1381–1424), ruler of the Karmanids
- Bae "Bengi" Seong-ung, South Korean professional League of Legends player and coach

== See also ==
- Benjy (disambiguation)
