= Mengi =

- Gender: Male

Origin
- Language: Turkish
- Meaning: Eternal, without a beginning

Other names
- Related names: Mengü

Mengi is a common masculine Turkish given name. It means "eternal", "without a beginning", "having no beginning". It is an Oghuz accented version of Mengü which is also a Turkish given name. Compared to Mengü, Mengi has an additional meaning: "happy".

== People ==
- Cemil Mengi, Turkish footballer playing in Türkiyemspor Berlin.
- Ramazan Mengi, founder of Mengi Yay.
- Ruhat Mengi, Adyghe origined Turkish journalist.
- Zeynep Mengi, former writer of Hayvan Dergisi and journalist working at Hürriyet.
- Güngör Mengi, former editor-in-chief of Sabah.
- Mengü Timur, khan of the Golden Horde in 1266-1280..
- Teden Mengi, English footballer
- Tuda Mengü, khan of the Golden Horde from 1280-1287

== See also ==
- Mongke (disambiguation), the Mongolian equivalent
