= Talabuga =

Khan of the Golden Horde from 1287 to 1291

Talabuga Khan
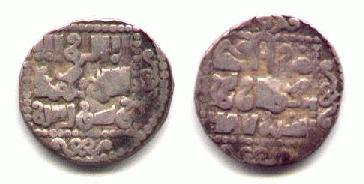
- Silver dirham of Tulabuga

Khan of the Golden Horde Western Half (Blue Horde)
- Reign: 1287–1291
- Predecessor: Tode Mongke
- Successor: Toqta
- Died: 1291
- House: Borjigin
- Dynasty: Golden Horde
- Father: Tartu
- Religion: Shamanist

Talabuga Khan, also known as Tolibuqa (Mongolian: Тольбух, ᠲᠣᠯᠠ
ᠪᠤᠬ᠎ᠠ; died 1291), was Khan of the Golden Horde from 1287 to 1291. He ruled a large, independent empire and one of the four successor states of the continent-sized Mongol Empire. He was the son of Tartu, great-grandson of Batu Khan, and great-great-great-grandson of Genghis Khan.

== Military career ==
=== Early Military Campaigns ===
As a young Mongol prince, Talabuga led men in the Mongol invasion of Lithuania under the overall command of Burundai in 1258-1259, a campaign in which Talabuga distinguished himself. This Mongol invasion of Lithuania is generally regarded by historians as a Mongol victory, with Lithuanian lands described as "devastated" following the incursion.

A year later, Talabuga led the second Mongol invasion of Poland alongside Nogai Khan, both again under the overall command of Burundai.

Nogai had devised a plan for the second Mongol invasion of Hungary, and in 1285 Talabuga joined him for this raid. As a rule, the Galician and Rus' dukes were ordered to accompany Tulabuga and Nogai during the Mongol raid into Hungary in 1285. The Khan of the Golden Horde at that time was Tode Mongke, who did not participate in the campaign, but remained in his winter quarters with his court and entourage. Heavy rains and snow caused the rivers to overflow, turning the land into a vast swamp, and the Mongol forces lost many men in their advance before the invasion was fully underway. Nogai's column entered Transylvania. Although Nogai and his Tatars plundered villages and some towns, they were beaten back on their return by the Hungarian royal army and the Vlachs. Talabuga's column entered Transcarpathia. The advance of Talabuga's forces was severely hampered by the heavy snows of the Carpathians, which resulted in the loss of horses, food and supplies, causing many thousands of Talabuga's men to die. Although greatly weakened by environmental factors, Talabuga's forces sacked and destroyed the fortified monastery of Sarivar (Sarvar?), ravaged central Hungary, and burned the city of Pest, which may have been largely abandoned in fear of the Mongol advance. On their return from Hungary, Talabuga's forces were ambushed by the Székely light cavalry.

Talabuga then ordered his starving forces to attack the cities of the Kingdom of Ruthenia, then ruled by King Leo I of Galicia. Talabuga and his forces overran the Volhynian defenders and sacked their cities, even though they were loyal to his allies within the Golden Horde, including Nogai.

=== Basqaq Ahmad ===
In 1284 (or 1285), a group of Rus princes from the Kursk principality complained to Talabuga about the overzealous tax-collector Ahmad the Basqaq. Talabuga in turn had Ahmad’s settlements destroyed. Ahmad (whose father was an emir in the service of Nogai) complained to Nogai, who granted him his support for a retaliatory attack against these Rus princes. This resulted in a series of several raids. Ultimately, one Rus prince was defeated and killed by another Rus noble, who was supported by a force of Talabuga’s men.

=== Ascendancy to Khan of the Golden Horde ===
In 1287, Talabuga became the Khan of the Ulus of Jochi.

According to the account of contemporary medieval chronicler Marco Polo, Talabuga “slew” Tode-Mongke Khan. Tode-Mongke was the reigning Khan of the Golden Horde at that time. Polo indicates that Talabuga did so with the support of Nogai. The account of Rashid al-Din however implies that Talabuga deposed of Tode-Mongke without assistance or support from Nogai. Talabuga Khan thus became the Khan of the Golden Horde.

Talabuga Khan was, in a sense, the rightful heir to the throne, as he represented the senior branch of the family of his great-grandfather Batu Khan, the founder of the Golden Horde. Talabugha Khan was the eldest son of Tartu, who was the eldest son of Toqoqan, who, despite being Batu's second son, became the head of the family with the extinction of the line of Sartaq (Batu's eldest son). This was in contrast to Nogai, whose grandfather was Jochi's seventh son, as Nogai was a descendant of a concubine and could not become Khan of the Golden Horde himself.

As Khan of the Golden Horde, Talabuga Khan empowered his closest generals, including his younger brother Kunjuk-bugha (Kunjukbuga) and his cousins who were the sons of the late Mengu-Timur Khan, especially Mengu-Timur's eldest son Alguy (Alqui).

=== Raid against the Kingdom of Ruthenia: Devastation of Volodymyr ===
After consolidating his power, Talabuga Khan raided the Kingdom of Ruthenia in the second half of 1287. This was probably his first military campaign as Khan of the Golden Horde. Talabuga Khan and his Mongol forces successfully plundered the Kingdom of Ruthenia, especially the region of Volodymyr.

=== Third Mongol Invasion of Poland ===
Talabuga Khan then led the third Mongol invasion of Poland in 1287-88. This would prove to be the largest Mongol invasion of Poland in history. Talabuga Khan ordered the princes of the western Rus principalities to join him in the invasion with their armies personally. The first Rus prince to join him was Prince Mstislav of Lutsk, whose army met the Mongol forces at the Horyn River. Talabuga Khan gathered his troops near Volodymyr in the recently plundered Volhynia. Prince Volodymyr and even King Leo I of Galicia would join him with their armies as his new vassals. In addition to these three Rus princes, Talabuga Khan was joined by Alguy, the son of the late Mengu-Timur Khan, and by Nogai and his army. According to modern historians, an army personally commanded by the Khan of the Golden Horde and accompanied by such powerful allies, all of whom were present in person, must by definition have been exceedingly large. The sources do not give exact numbers but rather refer to an "innumerable swarm" or a "great host", as does the Galician-Volhynian Chronicle. Talabuga Khan left a detachment of Tatar warriors in Volhynia to guard his rear against any vengeful Rus forces or hostile Lithuanians. In December 1287, Talabuga Khan, Alguy, and Nogai crossed into Polish lands and entered the Duchy of Lesser Poland with 30,000 cavalry, according to modern estimates.

According to the Galician-Volhynian chronicle, it was Talabuga Khan who had ordered Nogai to join him in this invasion, and Nogai had duly gathered his army and complied. In Poland, Talabuga Khan personally commanded an army of 20,000 men, mostly his own Mongol troops but also including Rus auxiliaries. In comparison, Nogai commanded about 10,000 men (one tumen), all of Mongol/Turkic ethnicity, with no sources mentioning Rus forces in Nogai's branch of the army.

Talabuga's army had initial success: the "invaders advanced among smoking churches and monasteries through the districts of Lublin" and Masovia, though they notably did not attempt to take the keep at Lublin, probably to maintain the momentum of their initial advance. Talabuga's forces then besieged the city of Sandomierz, where some Polish knights had already gathered. Shortly after that, the Mongols also besieged Krakow. The Polish defenders were taken by surprise but quickly adopted a new strategy that differed from the previous Mongol invasions: instead of riding out to meet the Mongols in the field, as they had done in the first two invasions, the Polish knights fought dismounted on the battlements of their castles and towns, shoulder to shoulder with the townspeople. This was to be followed by a second phase of riding out from these fortified places to meet weakened or isolated Mongol units in skirmishes and pitched battles. The Polish defenders included a larger number of Polish knights than in previous Mongol invasions. Overall, this was a more effective strategy. Although Krakow now had a stone castle and improved defenses, the Mongols knew of the considerable riches inside, and stormed the walls. The Polish defenders managed to repel the attack. The Mongols responded by lifting the siege and plundering the countryside. After the defense of Krakow, Duke Leszek the Black and a small retinue of his warriors slipped out of Krakow and rode to Hungary, where the Duke personally asked his long-time ally, King Ladislaus IV of Hungary, for reinforcements. Sandomierz would remain in Polish hands, although it was besieged. Talabuga Khan probably decided to leave his Rus regiments encamped around Sandomierz to immobilize the Polish forces inside. He took his Mongol army on a raid through the countryside, sending out small raiding parties to capture more slaves and loot. There is also some evidence that at some point during the invasion, Talabuga Khan and/or his entourage stayed in a small castle or manor house in the village of Goślice. However, Talabuga Khan's army lost a pitched battle somewhere "in the region of Sandomierz" after breaking the city's siege. Talabuga then called his raiding parties back to his main force to try to consolidate the booty they had taken in the short time they had been raiding.

Nogai would eventually split his army in two to raid the countryside as well. The first of Nogai's armies was defeated by Polish forces, largely composed of the local Polish highlander population, in the Podhale region on the Dunajec River. Duke Leszek's request for help was granted by the Hungarian king, and a joint Polish-Hungarian army defeated Nogai's second army near Sącz. Notably, some sources state that during the Polish campaign, Talabugha Khan and Nogai quarreled and "separated and returned by different routes," directly implying that the two Mongol leaders/armies were together at some point during the Polish campaign. Overall, this Mongol invasion of Poland is generally considered a defeat for the Mongols of the Golden Horde.

=== Raid against the Kingdom of Ruthenia: Sack of Lviv ===
Though some Mongol units would not leave Polish territory until February 1288, much of the Mongol army left Poland in January 1288. At this time, Talabuga decided to invade the Kingdom of Ruthenia again with the remaining Mongol and Turkic forces, even though King Leo I had helped him in the failed Polish invasion. The Mongol Khan probably did this to make up for the losses suffered in the Polish campaign, in the hope of acquiring more plunder and slaves. Thus, after leaving the Polish lands, Talabuga Khan and his army again invaded the neighboring kingdom of Ruthenia, including the capital city of Lviv, which they successfully looted and devastated. Nogai's army entered the lands of the Kingdom of Ruthenia a few days after Talabuga's, in late January 1288, raiding and hunting for survivors who had escaped the initial devastation of the Khan's army. According to the Galician-Volhynian Chronicle, in the immediate aftermath of Talabuga Khan and Nogai's brutally effective 1288 invasion of the Kingdom of Ruthenia, King Leo I conducted a census to count his losses. He found that 12,500 of his men and women had been killed in battle or taken captive by the Mongols.

The Mongol leadership then met at Volodymyr, dividing their Polish and Rus slaves. According to the Galician-Volhynian Chronicle, the Mongols enslaved twenty-one thousand "unmarried virgin girls" alone. Howorth writes that the number of slaves was 30,000 boys and girls. Although these numbers would have included both Polish and Rus slaves, Polish sources claim these figures are exaggerated. Krakowski estimates a maximum of "a few thousand" Polish slaves, and the total number of deaths from the Mongol invasion on the Polish side was "less" than the number enslaved.

Also in 1288, Prince Vladimir, in the presence of Tulabuga Khan and Alguy, decided to give his throne to Mstislav, the son of Danylo. King Leo tried to prevent this by recalling the existence of "his friend" Khan Nogai. Prince Mstislav forced him to withdraw, explaining that the transfer of power had already been made and agreed upon by the rulers of the Golden Horde and their advisors. It was a frightening prospect to complain to the Golden Horde.

=== War with Rostov ===
In the third year of Talabuga Khan's reign, the Principality of Rostov declared independence, rebelling against Mongol rule during the Rostov Uprising of 1289. The forces of the Golden Horde defeated Rostov, which again became a vassal state of the Golden Horde.

=== Raid against the Kingdom of Circassia ===
In 1290, Talabuga Khan ordered Nogai to join his forces in a great raid, and attacked the Kingdom of Zichia (Circassia). The campaign was militarily successful, as the Mongol armies under Talabuga Khan's command slaughtered the local defenders and acquired much loot. On their way back to their winter lands, Talabuga Khan's troops encountered a heavy snowfall and became lost. It is said that they were forced to eat their hunting dogs, then their horses, and finally their dead companions. Talabuga Khan blamed Nogai (whose forces had split off earlier and arrived safely at their winter quarters), and a rift grew between the two men.

=== Raids against the Ilkhanate ===
Tulabuga's main focus was Europe. During his reign as Khan of the Golden Horde, there were several significant border raids between the Golden Horde and the Ilkhanate, especially in 1288 and 1290.

Notably, Talabuga Khan never personally led his armies or took the field in any of these engagements against the Ilkhanate. The borders between the two Mongol empires did not change significantly after these conflicts. This may have been because the rulers of the Ilkhanate were of Genghisid descent, as was Talabuga Khan himself.

In the first of these raids, Talabugha Khan sent an army of 5,000 men on a lightning raid against the Ilkhanate in 1288 to disrupt trade in Persia. The Golden Horde army had passed through the Derbend Gorge and succeeded in plundering the merchants there. The Ilkhanate armies were slow to react, and when they set out for Shaburan, they found that the Golden Horde cavalry had already retreated with their loot.

In 1290, Nogai Khan led an army of 10,000 men of the Golden Horde on another raid against the Ilkhanate. Riding with Nogai were two of the sons of the late Khan Mengu-Timur, Abaqa (Abaqchi) and Mengli (Menglibuka). The Ilkhan Arghun rode with the armies of the Ilkhanate to meet him. The two armies met at the Karasu River. Nogai was defeated, with 300 of his men killed on the battlefield and many more taken prisoner by the victorious Ilkhanate army. Arghun celebrated the victory with a feast at Pilsuvar.

Despite these raids, Tulabuga never sent emissaries to Egypt to encourage the Mamluks to fight against his relatives in the Ilkhanate.

== Death ==
Nogai, who by 1291 was a cunning, experienced general and politician, pretended not to know how Talabuga Khan had come to hate him. He wrote letters to Talabuga Khan's mother about how he wanted to give his younger friend Talabuga Khan some advice. She in turn wrote to her son to trust Nogai, who had feigned serious illness. Nogai Khan once went so far as to put fresh blood in his mouth to fool Talabuga Khan's camp into believing that he was spitting blood and did not have long to live. In light of this, Talabuga Khan agreed to make amends with his former friend. He arrived at the rendezvous point with only a small entourage, including Alguy, Toghrul, Bulakhan, Kadan, and Kutugan. It is not known if his brother Kunjukbuga was present. Nogai had his men waiting in ambush, and when they came forward, he forced Talabuga Khan to dismount. Talabuga Khan was then strangled by several of Nogai's men to avoid shedding his blood, as was the Mongol custom of killing royalty. Nogai then placed Toqta (one of Mengu-Timur's younger sons) on the throne, who ordered the death of the rest of Talabuga's entourage, which included Toqta's older brothers.

== Genealogy ==
- Genghis Khan
- Jochi
- Batu Khan
- Toqoqan
- Tartu
- Talabuga Khan

== See also ==
- List of khans of the Golden Horde

Preceded by Tuda Mengu	Khan of Blue Horde and Golden Horde; 1287–1291	Succeeded by Tokhta
