= The Horde: How the Mongols Changed the World =

2021 history book by Marie Favereau

- Author: Marie Favereau
- Illustrator: Marie Favereau
- Cover artist: Ton Koene
- Language: English, French
- Genre: History
- Publisher: The Belknap Press of Harvard University Press
- Publication date: 2021
- Publication place: United States
- Pages: 377
- ISBN: 978-0-674-24421-4

The Horde: How the Mongols Changed the World is a 2021 non-fiction book by Marie Favereau, a professor at the Paris Nanterre University. It describes the foundation, administration, and eventual fate of the Golden Horde, one of the successor states of the Mongol Empire. The Horde received positive reviews for its accessibility and comprehensive detail.

== Contents ==
The Horde is divided into eight chapters. The first chapter, The Resilience of the Felt-Walled Tents, provides a background on the rise to power of Genghis Khan, founder of the Mongol Empire in 1206. It considers the administration and society of the new empire, and details the campaigns it fought, especially against the Khwarazmian Empire between 1219 and 1221. Particular attention is given to the events of the life of Jochi, who Genghis Khan considered his eldest son but whose paternity was suspect. The second chapter details how Genghis adapted traditional Mongol inheritance laws to apportion the territories of the Mongol Empire between his sons. It focuses on the lands in Central Asia and Russia which would later become the heartland of the Golden Horde, ruled by the Jochids (descendants of Jochi). It also covers how these lands were conquered and held after the Mongol invasion of Europe in the late 1230s.

The next chapters detail the administration and political organisation of the Horde. Favereau describes the succession controversy which followed the death of Jochi, which led to the Horde being split into two halves, the Blue Horde and the White Horde, led by Jochi's sons Orda and Batu respectively, but how overall rule fell to Batu. This chapter considers how the Golden Horde as a whole prospered during the thirteenth century, having built an administratively and economically complex empire. Chapter four explores the first wars between descendants of Genghis Khan, fought between the Golden Horde and the Ilkhanate to the south: it details the complex web of trade, diplomatic alliances, colonisation, and military activities which led to a political loss but an economic victory for the Golden Horde. The next two chapters consider the effects of this economic supremacy, in the Horde-led Chinggisid exchange, where the state exerted influence over long distances and closer to home in a process of "steppe urbanisation". It also had negative consequences, most notably in the civil wars of Nogai Khan's life.

The final chapters examine the decline and end of the Golden Horde. Chapter seven, Withdrawal, describes the anarchy which followed the extinction of the Jochid line, caused by the Black Death, the faltering of the Yuan dynasty in China, and the consequent opening of power to formerly-subservient lesser rulers such as Mamai.

The final chapter, Younger Brothers, tells about Tokhtamysh and Temür the Lame, also known as Tamerlane, and how their alliance brought the Golden Horde from its dark era. It also provides the story after Tokhtamysh and Tamerlane, in the 1430s and 1460s, explaining the hordes that came after Tokhtamysh and Tamerlane, like the Nogay Horde and the Kazan Horde.

The Epilogue starts with the story of the war between Ahmad Khan of the Volga Horde and Grand Prince Ivan IV of Moscow. The epilogue explains the argument about when the Horde fell, some say it was 1502 and others say the 1560s. The rest of the epilogue talks about the Horde’s influence over Russia, a concept that is explained throughout the book. The next 50 pages are the notes, acknowledgments, and the index.

== Reception ==
Stephen Pow, a historian of the Mongol Empire, felt that Favereau had achieved her aim of "conveying the cosmopolitan character of the Horde and its historical legacy". He praised her accessible language, aimed at the general reader, the references to non-literary sources, and the predominant use of Mongolian language terminology. However, he felt that some details were misrepresented: for example, he drew attention to an incorrectly labelled ceramic bowl and an account of the Mongol invasion of Europe which "neglects recent scholarship and is a curious amalgamation of contradicting theories". Pow concluded that there were strong similarities of structure and purpose with Jack Weatherford's 2004 book Genghis Khan and the Making of the Modern World.

Francis P. Sempa praised Favereau's "nuanced and comprehensive history" which, unusually, presented the Mongol Empire as "administratively complex". Another reviewer, the journalist Maria Lipman, highlighted the rich "ethnographic detail and descriptions of succession battles, military campaigns, and internecine warfare"; like Sempa, she remarked on Favereau's presentation of the Golden Horde as administratively beneficial for the divided Russian states, a portrayal she termed "strangely colonial".
