= Rostov Uprising of 1289 =

Slavic popular uprising against the Golden Horde

- Part of the Conflicts in Eastern Europe during Mongol rule
Date	1289
Location	Principality of Rostov
Result	Golden Horde victory

Belligerents
Principality of Rostov	Golden Horde

Commanders and leaders
Unknown	Talabuga Khan

Strength
Unknown	Unknown

In 1289, the Principality of Rostov declared independence, rebelling against Mongol rule. The forces of the Golden Horde defeated Rostov, which again became a vassal state of the Golden Horde.
