= Mengü =

- Gender: Male

Origin
- Language: Turkish
- Meaning: eternal, without a beginning

Other names
- Related names: Bengü, Bengi, Mengi

Mengü is a common masculine Turkish given name. In Turkish, "Mengü" means "eternal", "without a beginning", and/or "having no beginning".

== Real people ==
- Mengü Timur, khan of the Golden Horde in 1266–1280..
- Tuda Mengü, khan of the Golden Horde from 1280 to 1287
- Mengü Ertel, Turkish graphical artist (decorated as State Artist in 1998) .

== See also ==
- Mongke (disambiguation), the Mongolian equivalent
