= Dyuden =

13th-century Mongol general

Dyuden or Tudan (Russian: Тудан; fl. 1293) was a brother of Toqta, the khan of the Golden Horde and a great grandson of Batu Khan.

== Career ==
Dyuden was appointed as a general by Toqta. His 1293 campaign against Russia devastated 14 towns. A combined Russo-Tatar army led by him caused devastation to Suzdal, Vladimir, Murom, Yuryev-Polsky, Pereslavl-Zalessky, Moscow, Kolomna, Mozhaysk, Dmitrov, Uglich, and Volokolamsk. The grand prince of Vladimir, Dmitry, was forced to flee to Pskov, allowing Andrey to take the title of grand prince. Andrey's appanage center of Gorodets remained untouched by the campaign, as well as the cities in the north that belonged to the princes of Rostov.

During the campaign, Andrey and Dyuden planned to take Tver, which housed many refugees; however, Mikhail of Tver returned in time, which caused Andrey and Dyuden to abort their plan after learning about his presence there. Instead, after devastating the towns of Vladimir-Suzdal, the two took Volokolamsk. The Novgorodians were able to bribe the Tatars to leave the town and request Andrey to serve as their prince, which satisfied him enough and led to the Tatar troops to be withdrawn.

Dyudan had a son, Shchelkan, who was Özbeg Khan's ambassador in the Principality of Tver in 1327.

== Sources ==
- Fennell, John (2014) [1983]. The Crisis of Medieval Russia, 1200–1304. Longman History of Russia. Routledge. ISBN 978-0-582-48150-3.
- Halperin, Charles (1987). Russia and the Golden Horde: The Mongol Impact on Medieval Russian History. Indiana University Press. ISBN 9780253013668.
- Shaikhutdinov, Marat (23 November 2021). Between East and West: The Formation of the Moscow State. doi:10.2307/j.ctv249sgn2.
