= Byzantine–Mongol alliance =

13th–14th-century alliance in the Near East

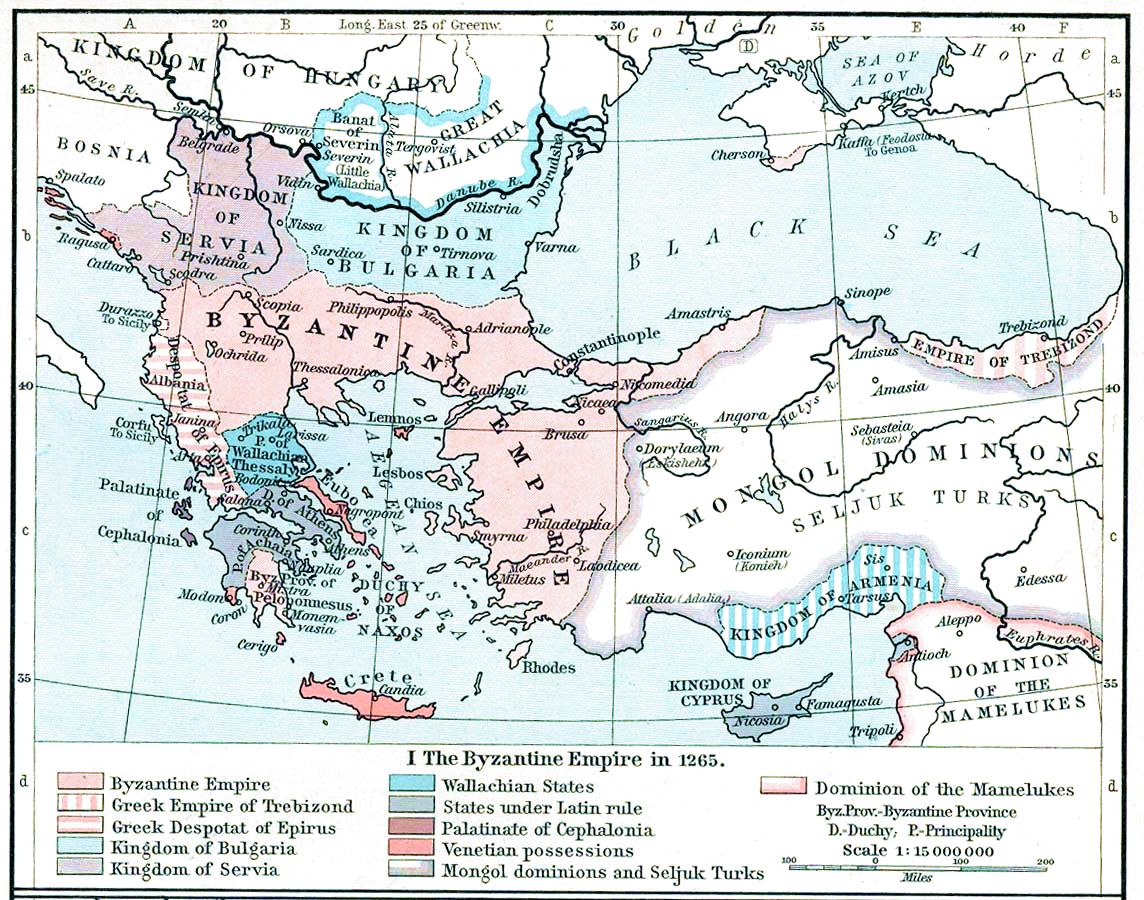
The Mongol Empire bordered the Byzantine Empire for several decades around 1265.

A Byzantine-Mongol Alliance occurred during the end of the 13th and the beginning of the 14th century between the Byzantine Empire and the Mongol Empire. (Note: "…agreed to prolong the Byzantine-Mongol (Iranian) alliance.") (Note: "From 1273 Michael allied with Noghai, giving him an illegitimate daughter in marriage and using him as a means to put pressure on Bulgaria.") Byzantium attempted to maintain friendly relations with both the Golden Horde and the Ilkhanate realms, and was caught in the middle of growing conflict between the two. The alliance involved numerous exchanges of presents, military collaboration and marital links, but dissolved in the middle of the 14th century.

== Diplomatic overtures ==
In the spring of 1242, John III Doukas Vatatzes, Emperor of Nicaea initiated a campaign against the Thessalonian Empire, and besieged its capital, Thessalonica. Soon after, the Mongols invaded the Sultanate of Iconium, causing Vatatzes to end the campaign early. Soon after the Battle of Köse Dağ in 1243, the Empire of Trebizond surrendered to the Mongol Empire while the court of Nicaea put its fortresses in order. In the early 1250s, the Latin emperor of Constantinople Baldwin II sent an embassy to Mongolia in the person of the knight Baudoin de Hainaut, who, following his return, met in Constantinople with the departing William of Rubruck. William of Rubruck also noted that he met an envoy of John III Doukas Vatatzes, Emperor of Nicaea, at the court of Möngke Khan around 1253.

Following the Mongol partition of the Sultanate of Rum between the pro-Mongol Kilij Arslan IV in the east and the pro-Nicaean Kaykaus II in the west, the Nicaean emperor Theodore Doukas Laskaris engaged in active diplomacy with the Ilkhanate, receiving a Mongol embassy in 1257. Through Laskaris' shrewd deception, the embassy was convinced that Nicaea was a large and powerful state with a formidable army and covered entirely by mountains, thus making it exceedingly difficult for the Mongols to subjugate. The Mongol ambassadors were therefore content with Nicaea remaining independent in exchange for Rum being recognized as a Mongol protectorate. The embassy also lead to negotiations for a marriage alliance between the two rulers, however Laskaris died in 1258 before the alliance could be finalized.

== Alliance under Michael VIII (1263–1282) ==
Emperor Michael VIII Palaiologos, after re-establishing Byzantine Imperial rule, established an alliance with the Mongols, who themselves were highly favourable to Christianity, as a minority of them were Nestorian Christians.

He signed a treaty in 1266 with the Mongol Khan of the Kipchak (the Golden Horde), and he married two of his daughters (conceived through a mistress, a Diplovatatzina) to Mongol kings: Euphrosyne Palaiologina, who married Nogai Khan of the Golden Horde, and Maria Palaiologina, who married Abaqa Khan of Ilkhanid Persia.

According to a 1267 letter by Pope Clement IV from Viterbo, Abaqa had agreed to combine forces with his father-in-law Michael VIII to help the Latins in the Holy Land, in preparation for the Eighth Crusade (the second of Louis IX):

The kings of France and Navarre, taking to heart the situation in the Holy Land, and decorated with the Holy Cross, are readying themselves to attack the enemies of the Cross. You wrote to us that you wished to join your father-in-law (the Greek emperor Michael VIII Palaiologos) to assist the Latins. We abundantly praise you for this, but we cannot tell you yet, before having asked to the rulers, what road they are planning to follow. We will transmit to them your advice, so as to enlighten their deliberations, and will inform your Magnificence, through a secure message, of what will have been decided.

— 1267 letter from Pope Clement IV to Abaqa

Mamluk envoys were traveling through Constantinople to the Golden Horde in the summer of 1263. However, the leader of the Ilkhans would have been angered if Michael allowed the envoys to pass, leading Michael to send them back to Egypt. In response, the Golden Horde army invaded Nicaean territory, freeing the former Seljuk Sultan Kaykaus II, who had been imprisoned on Nicaean territory since rebelling and fleeing from the Mongols. The conflict ended after the Mamluks convinced the Golden Horde to withdraw from Byzantine territory, and the Byzantines to allow the Mamluk envoys to travel to the Golden Horde.

According to Egyptian sources, Michael agreed to send fabrics to the Mongol Khan in Russia. When Michael realized the importance of the Mongols and became an ally of Noghai, he used his help to defend himself against Bulgaria when it tried to attack the Byzantine Empire in 1273 and 1279. Probably in 1276, Maria Palaiologina Kantakouzene, Michael's niece, planned an attack on Byzantium. She withdrew after Michael convinced the Mongols to raid Bulgaria. Later, in 1278, the Byzantines and the Mongols jointly besieged and captured Maria in Tirnovo. A group of 4,000 Mongol soldiers were dispatched to Constantinople in 1282, just before the death of Michael, to fight against the despot of Thessaly.

== Alliance under Andronikos II (1282–1328) ==
After 1295, Andronikos II offered Ghazan a marital alliance, in exchange for Mongol help to fight against the Turcomans at the Oriental frontier of the Byzantine Empire. Ghazan accepted the offer and promised to stop the incursions. The death of Ghazan in 1304 was mourned by the Byzantines.

This alliance would continue under Ghazan's successor, Oljeitu. In 1305, Ilkhan Oljeitu promised Andronikos II 40,000 men, and in 1308 dispatched 30,000 men to Bithynia to recover many Byzantine towns. Andronicus II gave daughters in marriage to Toqta, as well as his successor Uzbek (1312–1341), but relations turned sour at the end of Andronikos's reign and the Mongols mounted raids on Thrace between 1320 and 1324, until the Byzantine port of Vicina Macaria was occupied by the Mongols in the late 1330's.

Mongol control of western and central Anatolia was unstable, which allowed Turkmen groups to raid and cause damage to many frontier villages in the Byzantine Empire. These raids would eventually lead to the complete collapse of Byzantine Anatolia under Andronikos II. The Byzantines asked the Ilkhans for help in 1302-1303 and again in 1304-1305, but despite promises of help, it did not stop the Turkmen advances.

== End of friendly relations ==
Under Andronikos III relations seem to have turned even more conflictual. In 1341, the Mongols planned to attack Constantinople, and Andronikos III had to send an embassy to stop the attack.

== See also ==
- Mongol invasions of Anatolia

== Notes ==
=== Sources ===
- Lippard B. The Mongols and Byzantium 1243–1341. PhD dissertation. Indiana, 1984.
- Angelov, Dimiter (2019). The Byzantine Hellene: The Life of Emperor Theodore Laskaris and Byzantium in the Thirteenth Century. Cambridge University Press. ISBN 978-1-108-48071-0.
- Dagron, Gilbert; Mondrain, Brigitte; Deroche, Vincent; Cheynet, Jean-Claude (2001). XXe Congrès international des études Byzantines: Collège de France - Sorbonne, 19 - 25 août 2001: pré-actes: XXe Congrès international des études Byzantines, Collège de France-Sorbonne, 19-25 août 2001. Comité d'organization du XXe Congrès international des études Byzantines, Collège de France. ISBN 2-9517158-0-3.
- Heath, Ian and McBride, Angus. Byzantine Armies: AD 1118–1461. Osprey Publishing, 1995, ISBN 1-85532-347-8.
- Nicol, Donald M. (1993) [1972]. The Last Centuries of Byzantium, 1261–1453 (Second ed.). Cambridge: Cambridge University Press. ISBN 978-0-521-43991-6.
- Kazhdan, Alexander, ed. (1991). The Oxford Dictionary of Byzantium. Oxford and New York: Oxford University Press. ISBN 0-19-504652-8.
- Cheynet, Jean-Claude and Vannier, Jean-François. "Les premiers Paléologues". Etudes prosopographiques. Publications de la Sorbonne, 1986, ISBN 2-85944-110-7.
- Richard, Jean. Histoire des Croisades [History of the Crusades]. Paris: Editions Fayard, 1996.
- Jackson, Peter (2005). The Mongols and the West, 1221-1410. Pearson Longman. ISBN 0-582-36896-0.
- Luisetto, Frédéric. Arméniens & autres Chrétiens d'Orient sous la domination Mongole (in French). Librairie Orientaliste Paul Geuthner S.A., 2007, ISBN 978-2-7053-3791-9.
- Sicker, Martin (2000). The Islamic World in Ascendancy: From the Arab Conquests to the Siege of Vienna. Greenwood Publishing Group. ISBN 0-275-96892-8.
- Canal, Denis-Armand and Runciman, Steven. Histoire des Croisades [History of the Crusades]. Editions Dagorno, 1998, ISBN 2-910019-45-4.
- Morton, Nicholas (2022). The Mongol Storm: Making and Breaking Empires in the Medieval Near East. Basic Books. ISBN 9781541616301.
- Treadgold, Warren (1997). A History of the Byzantine State and Society. Stanford University Press. ISBN 0-8047-2421-0.
