= Toqoqan =

Son of Batu Khan

- Spouse: Köchü Khatun (Buka Ujin)
- Issue: Tartu; Mengu-Timur; Tode Mongke; Toqïqonqa; Ügechi
- House: Borjigin
- Dynasty: Golden Horde
- Father: Batu Khan

Toqoqan was a member of the ruling family of the Mongol Empire. He was a son of the khan of the Golden Horde, Batu. Through his father, he was also a great-grandson of the Mongol emperor Genghis Khan. Though Toqoqan never reigned himself, many subsequent khans were descended from him.

His chief wife was Köchü Khatun, also known as Buka Ujin of the Oirats. Her father (or possibly brother) was Buqa-Temür, who was a grandson of Genghis Khan through his daughter Checheikhen.

Toqoqan had five sons, of whom the eldest, Tartu, became father of the Khan Talabuga. Two further sons, Mengu-Timur and Tode Mongke, both by Köchü Khatun, were also khans of the Golden Horde.

== See also ==
- List of khans of the Golden Horde
