= Toqta =

Khan of the Golden Horde from 1291 to 1312

Toqta Tokhtokh
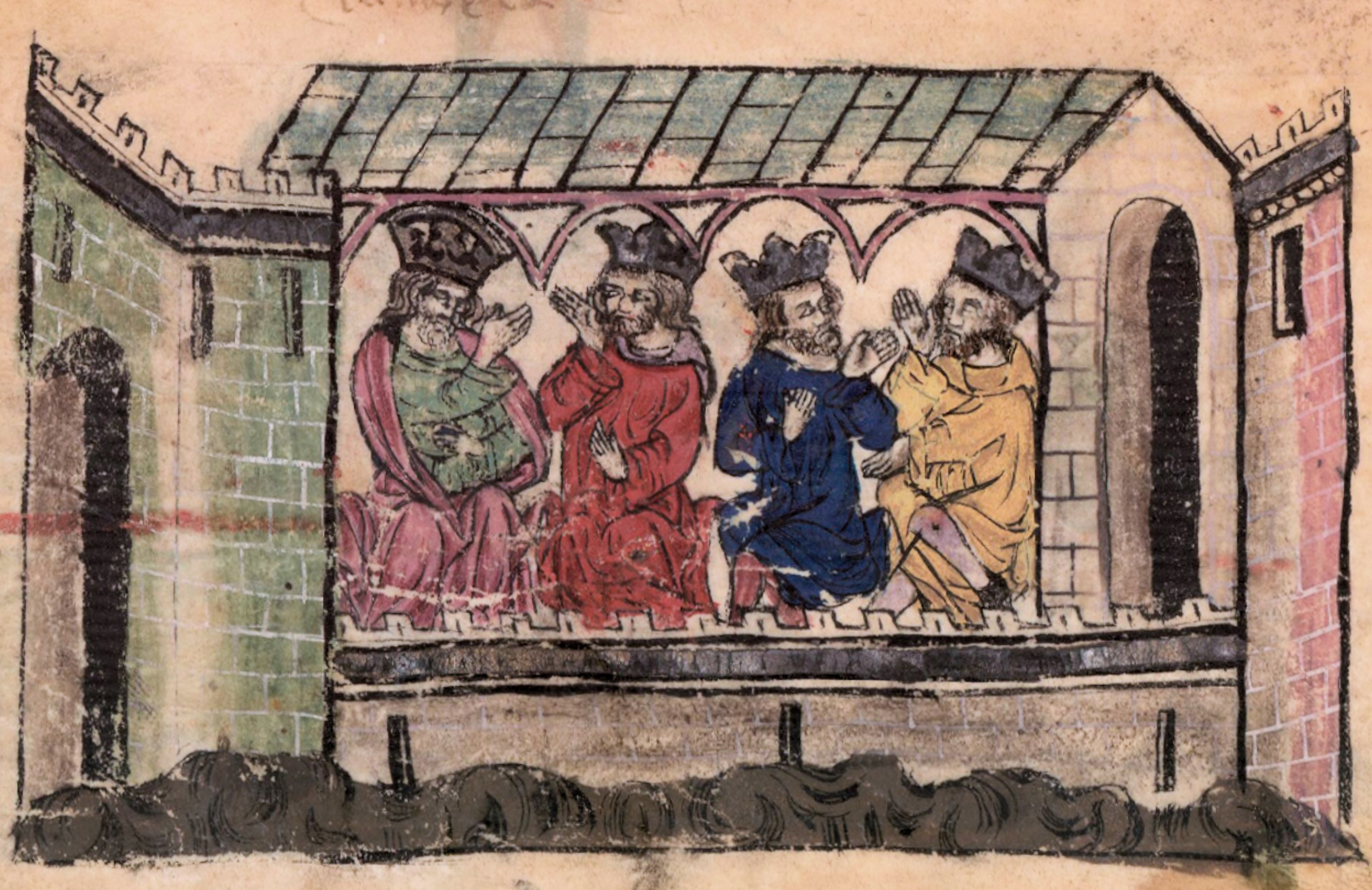
- A 14th century French illustration of Tokhta and his cousins, Temür, Chabar and Oljaitu.

Khan of the Golden Horde Western Half (Blue Horde)
- Reign: 1291–1312
- Predecessor: Talabuga
- Successor: Öz Beg Khan
- Died: c. 1312
- Spouse: Bulughan Khatun; Tükünche Khongirad; Maria Palaiologina
- Issue: Tükel Buqa; Ilbasar; Marija (poss.)
Names
- Togtokh Khan (ᠲᠣᠭᠲᠠᠬᠣ ᠬᠠᠨ; Тогтох хан)
- House: Borjigin
- Dynasty: Golden Horde
- Father: Mengu-Timur
- Mother: Olju Khatun Khongirad
- Religion: Shamanist

Tokhta (also spelled Toqta, Toktu, Tokhtai, Tochtu or Tokhtogha; died c. 1312) was Khan of the Golden Horde from 1291 to 1312. He was a son of Mengu-Timur and a great-grandson of Batu Khan.

His name "Tokhtokh" means "hold/holding" in the Mongolian language. He was known with another name Külüg among his family.

== Early reign under Nogai ==
Nogai Khan orchestrated a palace coup that ended with the ousting and execution of Talabuga. Tokhta became khan in 1291 and at first he was subordinate to Nogai. However, Tokhta eventually united his supporters against Nogai and he challenged Nogai's authority in 1297, leading to a civil war. In 1299, Tokhta finally defeated Nogai and stabilized the Golden Horde.

Tokhta wanted to eliminate the Russian princes' semi-independence and the Russian princes grew increasing restive. As a form of submission, military service was used by the khans, but Russian auxiliary troops were only used in rare attacks in Poland and Hungary, as well as in military campaigns in the Caucasus. Russian troops remained effective when the khan intervened in Russian affairs. In 1293, Tokhta sent his brother Tudan to provide military support for Andrei against Dmitry, who had supported the cause of Nogai. Tudan's army would go on to devastate fourteen towns. Tokhta himself (known here as Tokhta-Temur) went to Tver, and forced Dmitry Alexandrovich, Nogai's ally, to abdicate. The Russian chroniclers depicted these events as "The harsh-time of Batu returns". Some sources have suggested that Tokhta and Nogai had worked together.

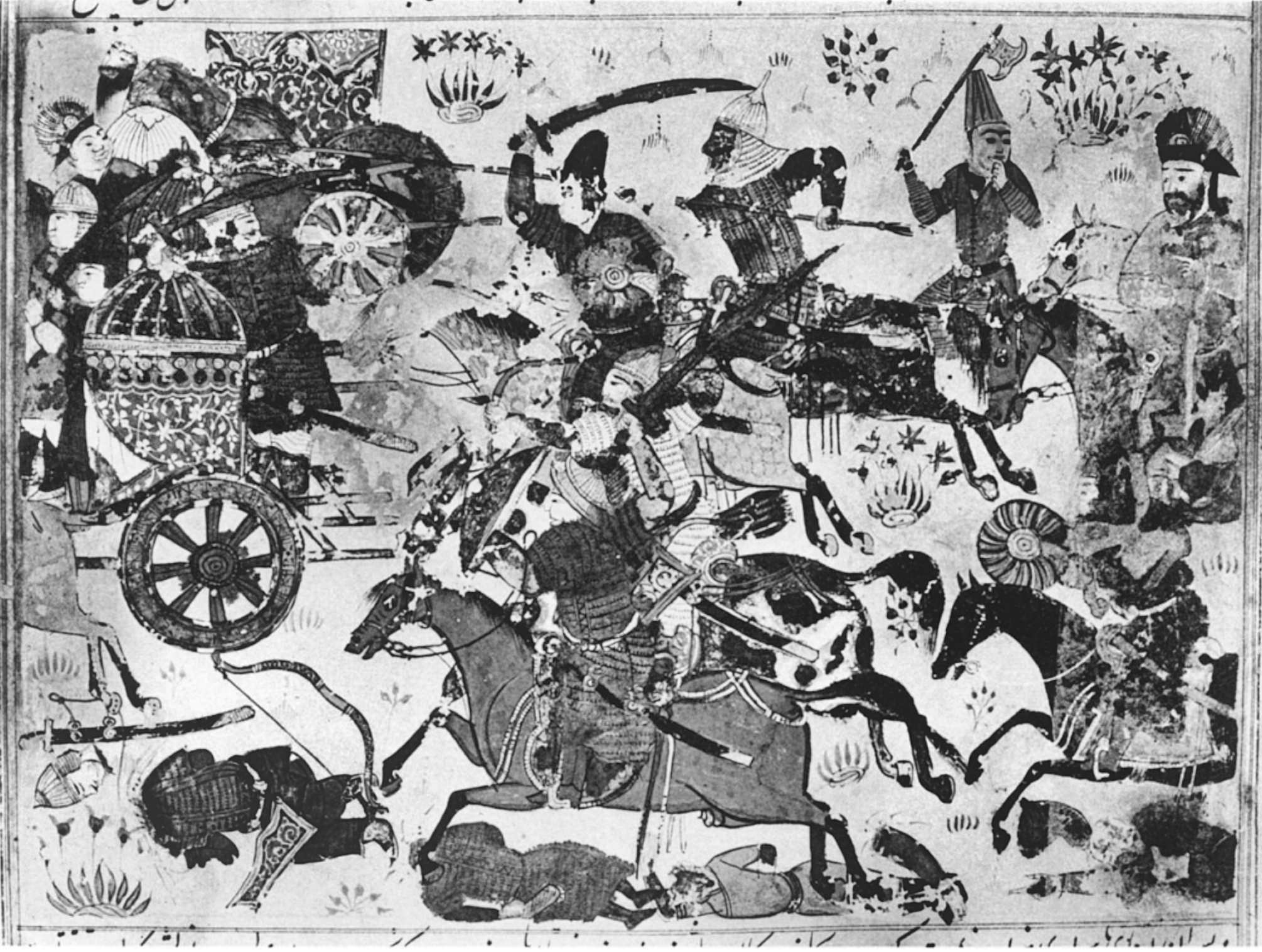
The battle between the armies of Tokhta and Nogai in the year 698 (1298-99 CE) on the River Don, in which the former was defeated. Jami al-Tawarikh, late 14th century (Asiatic Society, D.31, Folio 44 recto)

Soon afterwards, Tokhta and Nogai began a deadly rivalry. The Khan's father-in-law Saljiday of the Khunggirads, his wife Bekhlemish, the granddaughter of Tolui, and other Chingisids in the Horde also complained about Nogai's contrariness to him. Nogai had refused to come to the court of the Khan. They also disagreed on trade rights of the Venetians and Genoese merchants.

Khan Tokhta's forces lost the first battle against Nogai in 1296–1297. Nogai did not bother to chase after him, deciding instead to return to his lands. Tokhta asked the Ilkhan Ghazan for assistance. The latter refused because he did not want to be mixed up with their quarrels. In 1300, Tokhta finally defeated Nogai at the battle of the Kagamlyk River, south-southwest of the city of Poltava, and united the lands from the Volga to the Don under his authority. Nogai's son Chaka had fled first to the land of the Alans, and then to Bulgaria, where he reigned as their tsar. This had enraged Tokhta so much that Chaka's brother-in-law Theodore Svetoslav participated in a plot to overthrow him soon after. Chaka was found strangled and his head was sent to Khan Tokhta to show the allegiance of Theodore Svetoslav and the Bulgarian nobility. Tokhta then divided Nogai's lands, which had stretched from Crimea and the Russian principalities to modern Romania, among his brother Sareibugha and his sons.

== Later reign ==
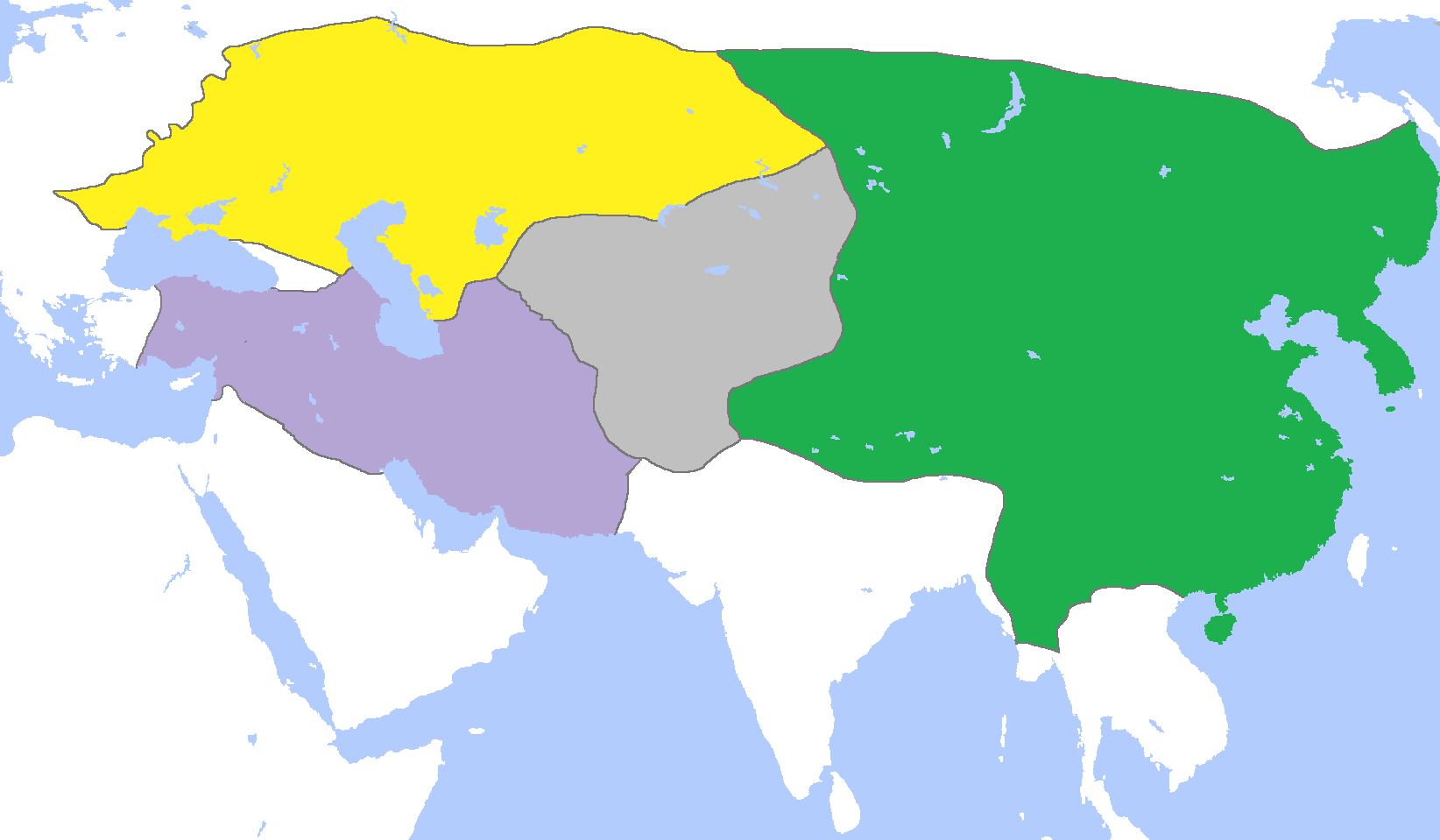
The division of the Mongol Empire, c. 1300, with the Golden Horde shown in yellow.

While Tokhta was busy dealing with Nogai, Bayan Khan asked for his help against the rebels in the White Horde. Unfortunately, Tokhta was unable to send him any assistance. In 1301, Bayan was forced to flee to Tokhta. Tokhta then helped him to reassert his authority by attacking Kuruichik, who was backed by Qaidu. The forces of the Golden Horde then won the conflict with the Chagatai Khan Duwa and Qaidu's son Chapar.

After solidifying his control over the Russian principalities and the Kipchak steppes, Tokhta demanded that the Ilkhan Ghazan give back the regions of Azerbaijan and the Arran. Ghazan refused his request and replied, "That land was conquered by our ancestors' Indian steel swords!" Tokhta then decided to restore the former alliance with the Mamluks of Egypt and sent them his envoys. During the reign of Oljeitu, the respective armies of the Golden Horde and the Ilkhanate engaged in small border conflicts, but this was not to last long.

In 1304, messengers from the Chagatai Khanate and the Yuan dynasty arrived in Sarai. They introduced their masters' plan and idea of peace. Tokhta accepted the nominal supremacy of the Yuan Emperor Temür Öljeytü (Chengzong), the grandson of Kublai Khan; at the same time Öljeitü ruled Ilkhanid Persia, just ceding the lands of Arran to Toqta and Duwa retained nominal sovereignty in the Chagatai Khanate. The postal system and trade routes were also restored. The Golden Horde sent two tumens (20,000) to buttress the Yuan frontier.

Khan Tokhta arrested the Italian residents of Sarai, and besieged the city of Caffa in 1307. The cause behind this was apparently Tokhta's displeasure at the Italian trade in Turkic slaves who were mostly sold as soldiers to the Egyptian Mamluk Sultanate. The Genoese resisted for a year, but in 1308 set fire to their city and abandoned it. Relations between the Italians and the Golden Horde remained tense until 1312 when Tokhta died during preparations for a new military campaign against the Russian lands. Some sources claimed that he died without a male heir. But the Yuan shi and some Muslim sources stated that he had at least three sons and one of them was murdered by Khan Ozbeg's supporters.

Although he was Shamanist, he was interested in Buddhism. He was the last non-Muslim khan of Golden Horde.

In 1297, Khan Tokhta married Maria Palaiologina, the illegitimate daughter of the Byzantine Emperor, Andronikos II Palaiologos. Their daughter Marija later married Narimantas, a son of Gediminas the Grand Duke of Lithuania.

== Genealogy ==
- Genghis Khan
- Jochi
- Batu Khan
- Toqoqan
- Mengu-Timur
- Toqta

== Ancestry ==
Ancestors of Toqta

16. Jochi, Khan of the Ulus of Jochi
8. Batu, Khan of the Golden Horde
17. Ukhaa Ujin of the Khongirad
4. Toqoqan
2. Mengu-Timur, Khan of the Golden Horde
20. Turalji Gurgan of the Oirats
10. Buqa-Temür of the Oirats
21. Checheikhen
5. Buka Ujin
1. Toqta, Khan of the Golden Horde
6. Saljidai Gurgan of the Khongirad
3. Olju Khatun
28. Tolui
14. Qutuqtu
29. Linqum Khatun of the Naimans
7. Kelmish Aqa
15. A Kipchak concubine

== See also ==
- List of khans of the Golden Horde

== Sources ==
- Hautala, Roman (25 May 2022). "The Jochid Ulus". In May, Timothy; Hope, Michael (eds.). The Mongol World. Taylor & Francis. ISBN 978-1-351-67631-1.

Preceded by Talabuga	Khan of the Blue Horde and Golden Horde; 1291–1312	Succeeded by Uzbeg Khan
