= Benjy's =

Restaurant in Houston, Texas, U.S.

- Interactive map of Benjy's

Restaurant information
- Established: 1995
- Closed: 2020
- Food type: American
- Location: 2424 Dunstan Road, Houston, Texas, 77005, United States
- Coordinates: 29.7196°N 95.4164°W

Benjy's was a restaurant serving American cuisine in Houston, in the U.S. state of Texas.

== History ==
The restaurant was established by Benjy Levit in 1995. Benjy's closed in 2020, on a temporary basis, during the COVID-19 pandemic.

== Reception ==
In Condé Nast Traveler' 2019 list of the city's 23 best restaurants, Charu Suri and Diane Oates wrote: "Here's the thing about Benjy's: Everyone will tell you it's their favorite restaurant—all for entirely different reasons. The brunch bunch will swear up and down that the French toast is the city's best hangover cure; the dinner crowd will point to the caramelized scallops as a near-religious experience. No one can agree on which dish—or even which meal—is best here, and that's what makes this place such a hit."

== See also ==
- Impact of the COVID-19 pandemic on the restaurant industry in the United States
