= Tode Mongke =

Khan of the Golden Horde from 1280 to 1287

Tuda Möngke Тодмөнх
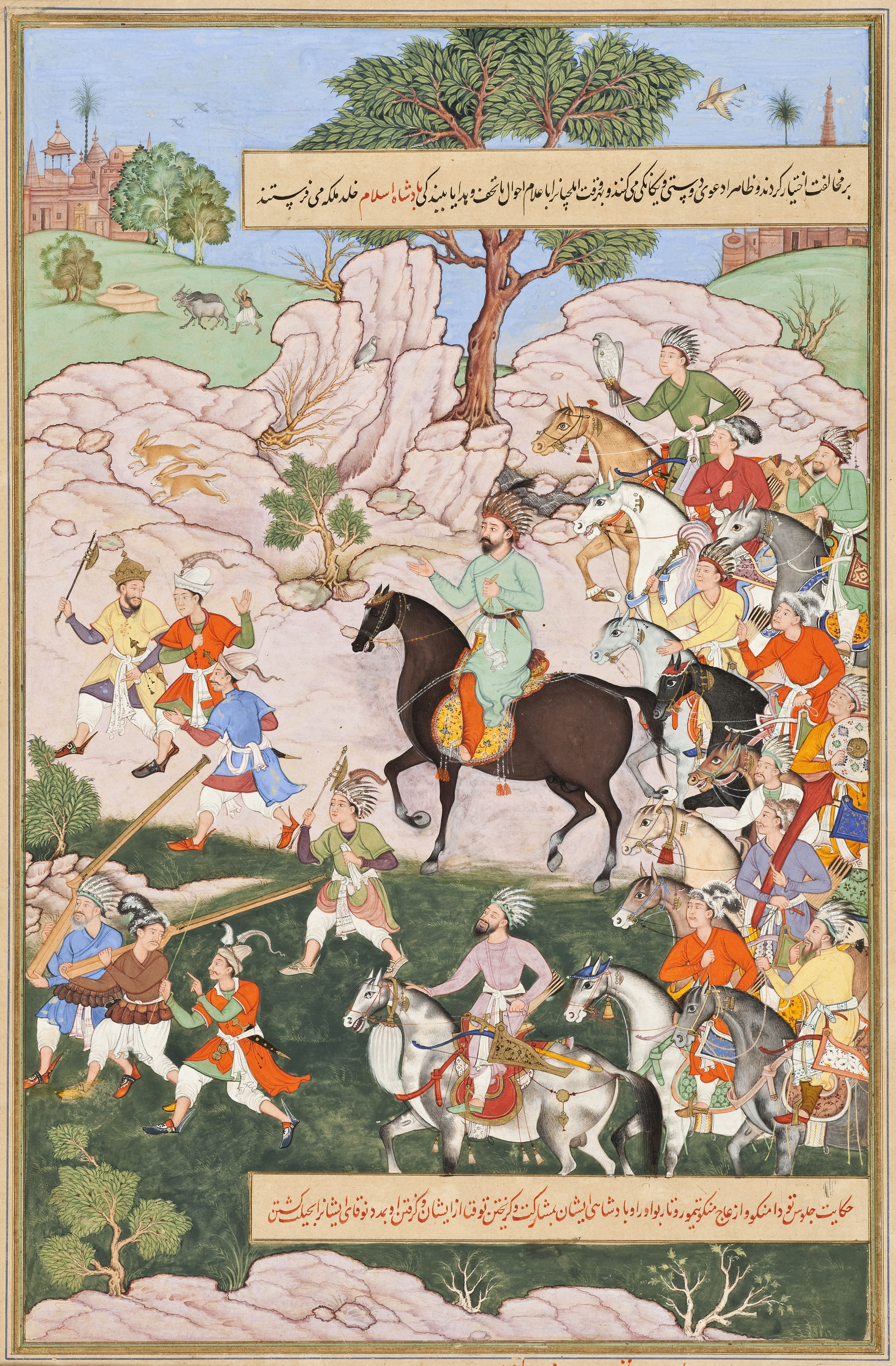
- Tuda Mengu leading the warriors of the Golden Horde, Mughal painting (1596)

Khan of the Golden Horde Western Half (Blue Horde)
- Reign: 1280–1287
- Predecessor: Mongke Temur
- Successor: Tole Buqa
- Died: 1287
- House: Borjigin
- Dynasty: Golden Horde
- Father: Toqoqan
- Mother: Köchü Khatun
- Religion: Tengrism; Islam (after 1283)

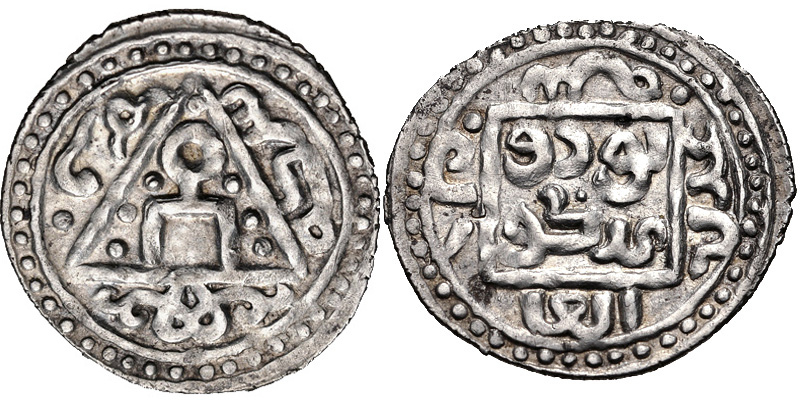
Coinage of Töde Möngke (Mengu). AH 679-687 AD 1280–1287 Qrim (Crimea) mint

Tuda Mengu (also known as Tode Mongke and Tudamongke; Mongolian: Тодмөнх, romanized: Todmönkh or Tudamönkh, lit. 'Eternal Brightness'; Turki/Kypchak: تودا منکو; died 1287) was Khan of the Golden Horde, a division of the Mongol Empire, from 1280 to 1287. He was only the nominal ruler, and in 1287, Noghai forced him to abdicate.

== Biography ==
Tode Mongke was the son of Toqoqan and a grandson of Batu Khan. Following the death of Berke in 1267, Tode was one of the three candidates for the throne, along with Berke's son and his brother, Mongke Temur. The sources disagree on who was designated as Berke's heir, with some accounts saying that Berke supported Mongke to gain the backing of Batu's followers. After several months, Mongke was chosen as khan by the Jochid elite. Following Mongke Temur's death, Tode Mongke was supported by Noghai, the most powerful bey, to become khan. He converted to Islam in 1283.

Noghai did not involve Tode Mongke in his military campaigns, during which he was able to take control of parts of Lithuania and Poland. The Russian princes of Bryansk and Suzdal were also subjugated. Tode Mongke gained a reputation for being disinterested in politics. However, he often disagreed with Noghai in their dealings with the Russian principalities. For instance, Tode Mongke supported Andrey for the grand princely throne of Vladimir, while Noghai supported his older brother Dmitry and helped him regain the throne in 1283. As a result, Noghai allied with some of the most powerful descendants of Batu, and in 1287, Tode Mongke was forced to abdicate. Tole Buqa was then elected as khan, but was forced to share power.

== Family ==
He had two wives and several concubines:

1. Ariqachi Khatun (from Khongirad tribe)
  - Or-Menggü
2. Töre Qutluq Khatun (from Alchi-Tatar tribe)
  - Chechektü
3. Unknown concubine
  - Töbetei

== See also ==
- List of khans of the Golden Horde
- Mengü

== Sources ==
- Favereau, Marie (20 April 2021). The Horde: How the Mongols Changed the World. Harvard University Press. ISBN 978-0-674-24421-4.
- Favereau, Marie; Pochekaev, Roman Yu. (2023). "The Golden Horde, c. 1260–1502". The Cambridge History of the Mongol Empire. Cambridge University Press. pp. 243–318. ISBN 978-1-107-11648-1.
- May, Timothy (7 November 2016). The Mongol Empire: A Historical Encyclopedia [2 volumes]. Bloomsbury Publishing USA. ISBN 979-8-216-11905-0.

Preceded by Mongke Temur	Khan of the Golden Horde; 1280–1287	Succeeded by Tole Buqa
