= Mengu-Timur =

Khan of the Golden Horde from 1266 to 1280

Möngke Temür ᠮᠥᠩᠬᠡᠲᠡᠮᠦᠷ
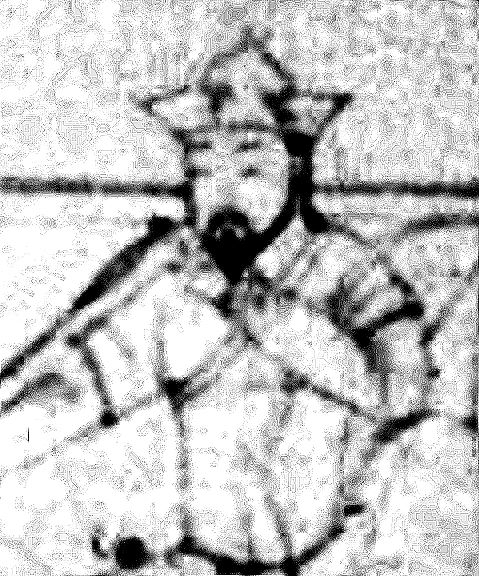
- Miniature from a Timurid genealogy manuscript depicting Mengu-Timur, c. 1405–1409.

Khan of the Golden Horde Western Half (Blue Horde)
- Reign: 1266–1280
- Predecessor: Berke
- Successor: Tode Mongke
- Died: 1280; Sarai
- Spouse: Oljai Khatun; Sultan Khatun; Qutuqui Khatun
- Issue more...: Toqta; Toghrilcha; Alqui; Thocomerius
- House: Borjigin
- Dynasty: Golden Horde
- Father: Toqoqan Khan
- Mother: Köchu Khatun
- Religion: Tengrism
- Tamga

Mengu-Timur (/ˈmɛŋɡuː ˈtɪmər/ MEN-goo TIM-ər) or Möngke Temür (Mongolian: ᠮᠥᠩᠬᠡᠲᠡᠮᠦᠷ, Мөнхтөмөр; died 1280) was Khan of the Golden Horde, a division of the Mongol Empire, from 1266 to 1280. He was a son of Toqoqan Khan, himself the son of Batu, and Köchu Khatun of Oirat, the daughter of Toralchi Küregen and granddaughter of Qutuqa Beki.

His name literally means "Eternal Iron" in the Mongolian language.

== Early reign and foreign policy ==
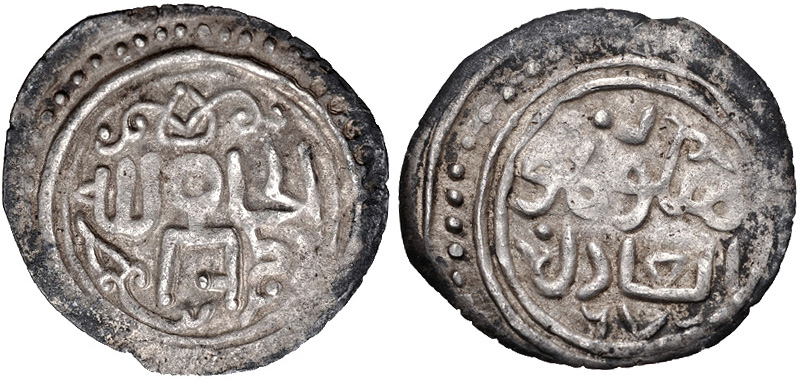
Coinage of Möngke (Mengu) Timur. Bulghar mint. Dated AH 672 or 3 (AD 1273–1275)

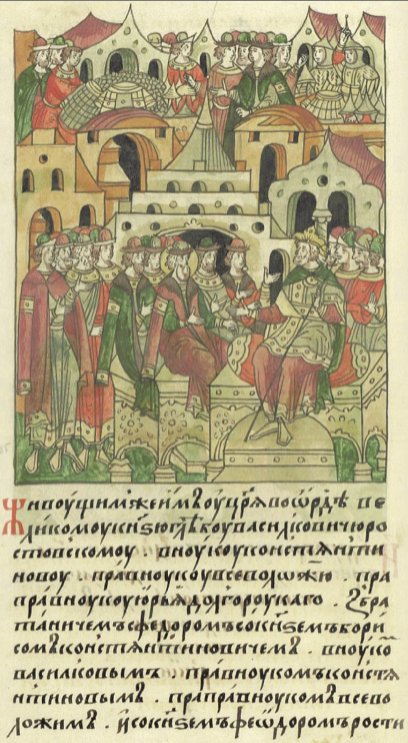
Mengu-Timur with the Russian princes, miniature from the Illustrated Chronicle of Ivan the Terrible (16th century)

Mengu-Timur was one of three candidates for the throne following the death of Berke. The other two candidates were Berke's son and Mengu-Timur's younger brother, Tode Mongke. Some sources say that Berke had designated Mengu-Timur as his heir as part of a strategy to secure the support of Batu's followers. The succession caused tension within the Horde and this is reflected in Russian sources. After several months, the Jochid elites ultimately agreed to select Mengu-Timur as khan.

At the start of his reign, Mengu-Timur reformed the monetary system by issuing new silver coins that bore his name and seal, with no reference of the khagan. He also maintained the independence of the Golden Horde by refusing to visit Kublai upon his enthronement, instead requiring an ambassador of Kublai to visit him. He also increased the number of mints and made sure that coins specific to a region were valid across the Horde. This allowed for regional autonomy and therefore protected local trade.

The very first yarlyk (decree) issued by Mengu-Timur was a tax exemption for the Russian Church in 1267. Russian Orthodox clergy were also exempt from performing military service. Mengu-Timur's religious policy aligned with that of Genghis Khan and Ögedei Khan, where the priests of certain religions were granted tarkhan status in exchange for them praying for the khan and his family. As a result, Mengu-Timur was able to strengthen ties with the Russian principalities. Mengu-Timur applied the tarkhan system, which co-opted elites, instead of the dhimmi system, which aimed to integrate subjects by requiring non-Muslims to pay a special tax. Mengu-Timur determined that Russian peasants would obey the nobles and religious leaders, and so he used the tarkhan system to co-opt the nobility and gain their support. As a result, the Russian clergy were able to establish new landed properties.

Mengu-Timur's foreign policy also aligned with that of Berke. He did not convert to Islam, but was able to exchange embassies with the Mamluk Sultanate, and the alliance was preserved due to the economic benefits that both parties received. After the war with the Ilkhanate ended, Mengu-Timur maintained his relationship with Baybars and his successors. The Genoese established trading posts in territories controlled by the Horde, the largest of which was in Crimea at Sudak. The Genoese also created a fortified harbor, and around 1275–1280, Mengu-Timur allowed them to rent Caffa. Mengu-Timur welcomed the traders as long as they paid taxes and respected the law.

Unlike Berke, Mengu-Timur tried to re-establish peaceful tributary relations with the Byzantine Empire. Michael VIII Palaiologos sent a large tribute of textiles and then offered one of his daughters, Euphrosyne. Mengu-Timur accepted Michael's offer and the princess was married to Nogai Khan, since he was given control over the territories closest to the Byzantine Empire. Mengu-Timur also maintained the agreement with the Byzantine Empire that allowed ships to pass through the Bosporus and the Dardanelles from the Black Sea. The alliance with the Byzantines strengthened the Golden Horde's control over access to the Black Sea, while the alliance with the Mamluks gave the Jochids access to the Nile and the Red Sea.

In 1280, he launched his campaign against Poland which ended in his defeat. He died soon after this unsuccessful campaign.

== Golden Horde and the Mongol Empire ==
Mengu-Timur was originally nominated by Kublai Khan. But he sided with Kaidu who was a rival of the latter. Kublai only stopped him from invading the Ilkhanate with a large force. The Golden Horde helped Kaidu to put down the force of the Chagatai Khanate. In 1265, Kaidu was defeated by the Chagatai army under Ghiyas-ud-din Baraq. That is why, the Khan of the Jochid Ulus sent 30,000 armed-men headed by his uncle Berkecher to support Kaidu's force. Their victory over the Chagatai army forced Ghiyas-ud-din Baraq to initiate a peace treaty with them. Together they formed an alliance and demarcated the borders of their realms in Talas. Rashid al-Din claims that the meeting took place in the spring of 1269 in Talas, while Wassaf writes that it took place around 1267 to the south of Samarkand. Though He and Kaidu admonished Baraq for invading the Ilkhanate, Mengu-Timur congratulated Ilkhan Abagha upon his stunning victory over the Chagatai army in order to hide his true intention. The two had been probably fighting with each other until the 1270s. But some scholars disaffirm that such battles occurred.

Following the precedent in the Mongol Empire since the reign of Genghis Khan, Mengu-Timur granted tax-exempt status to the Orthodox Christian Church in late 1260s and did not count priests and their lands during the census in 1275.

During that time, Kublai dispatched his favorite son, Nomu Khan, against Kaidu to Almaliq. Nomu Khan sent letters to Chingisid nobles to reassert their support. Mongke Temur responded that he would protect Kublai from Kaidu if he assaulted the Yuan. In 1276, Chingisid princes Shiregi and Tokhtemur defected to Kaidu's side and arrested Kublai's son. Then they sent Nomughan and his brother Kökechü to Mengu-Timur and his general to Kaidu. The court of the Golden Horde released Nomughan in 1278, or 10 years later.

== Family ==
Mengu-Timur married several times:

1. Öljei Khatun — daughter of Saljidai Küregen of Khongirad and Kelmish Aqa (daughter of Qutuqtu)
  - Alqui
  - Toqta
2. Sultan Khatun (from Hüshin tribe)
  - Abachi
  - Tödeken
3. Qutuqui Khatun (unknown tribe)
  - Börlük

With unknown wives and concubines:

- Tudan
  - Cholkhan
- Sarai Buqa
- Moloqai
  - Ulus Buqa
- Qadan
- Qoduqai
  - Künges
- Toghrilcha
  - Öz Beg

== See also ==
- List of khans of the Golden Horde
- Kaidu–Kublai war

== Sources ==
- "Мангу-Тимур" . Brockhaus and Efron Encyclopedic Dictionary (in Russian). 1906.
- Favereau, Marie (20 April 2021). The Horde: How the Mongols Changed the World. Harvard University Press. ISBN 978-0-674-24421-4.
- Favereau, Marie; Pochekaev, Roman Yu. (2023). "The Golden Horde, c. 1260–1502". The Cambridge History of the Mongol Empire. Cambridge University Press. pp. 243–318. ISBN 978-1-107-11648-1.
- May, Timothy (7 November 2016). The Mongol Empire: A Historical Encyclopedia [2 volumes]. Bloomsbury Publishing USA. ISBN 979-8-216-11905-0.

Preceded by Berke	Khan of the Blue Horde and Golden Horde; 1266–1280	Succeeded by Tuda-Mengu
