= Marie Favereau =

French historian

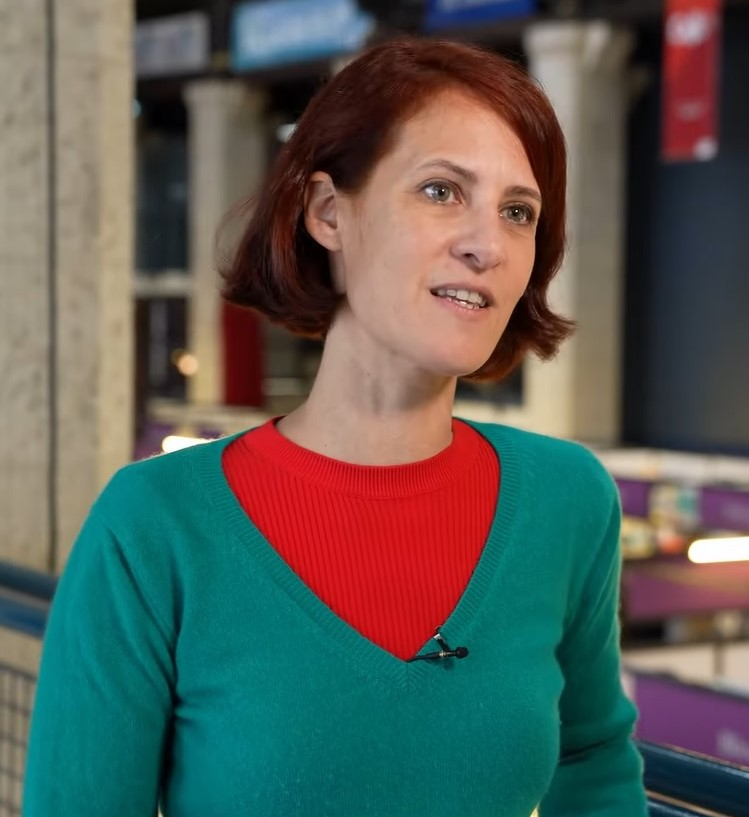
- Favereau in 2025
- Title: Associate Professor of history

Academic background
- Thesis: La horde d’or de 1377 à 1502: Aux sources d’un siècle « sans Histoire »
- Doctoral advisor: Stéphane Viellardat

Academic work
- Discipline: History
- Sub-discipline: History of the Mongol empire
- Institutions: Paris Nanterre University
- Notable works: The Horde: How the Mongols Changed the World (Harvard, 2021)

Marie Favereau Doumenjou is a French historian and writer. She currently teaches medieval history at Paris Nanterre University, and specialises in the history of the Mongol Empire and Islamic history. She has published several books. Her 2021 book, The Horde: How the Mongols Changed the World, was published to critical acclaim, being nominated for the Cundill History Prize, the Prose Award in World History by the Association of American Publishers, and listed as a notable book of the year by several publications.

== Career ==
Favereau completed her undergraduate and master's degrees in history from the Paris-Sorbonne University, where she also obtained a degree in Arabic language and civilization. Her doctoral thesis, La horde d’or de 1377 à 1502: Aux sources d’un siècle « sans Histoire », was supervised by Stéphane Viellardat at the Paris-Sorbonne University and University of San Marino. Favereau is currently an associate professor of history at Paris Nanterre University, and was a member of the French Institute of Oriental Archaeology in Cairo, Egypt. She previously worked as a researcher at the University of Oxford from 2014 to 2019 on a project concerning nomadic empires, held a Fulbright Scholarship at the Institute for Advanced Study at Princeton, and lectured at Leiden University from 2011 to 2014.

== Writing ==
Favereau has published several books, beginning with La Horde D'or Et Le Sultanat Mamelouk: Naissance D'une Alliance in 2018; a history of the Mamluk sultanate's alliance with the Golden Horde. She then published La Horde d'Or et l'islamisation des steppes eurasiatiques, which is an account of the conversion of the khans Berke and Özbeg, and the spread of Islam amongst the Mongols. In 2020, she published a children's novel about the life of Genghis Khan, illustrated by Laurent Seigneuret.

In 2021, Favereau published The Horde: How the Mongols Changed the World, which was described by the publisher (Harvard University Press) as "..the first comprehensive history of the Horde". The Horde was a finalist for the Cundill History Prize in 2021, being described by a judge, Michael Ignatieff, as a "a vividly written history on a vast canvas". It was also a finalist in the world history category of the 2022 Prose Awards by the Association of American Publishers. Several publications included it on lists of the best history and non-fiction books of 2021, including writer Stephen L. Carter for The Washington Post, and historian Peter Frankopan for The Spectator.

== Publications ==
- (2014) La Horde d’Or. Les héritiers de Gengis Khan, Paris, éditions de la Flandonnière, 2014
- (2018) La Horde d’Or et le sultanat mamelouk. Naissance d’une alliance, (Cairo, Institut Français d’Archéologie Orientale) ISBN 2724707184, 978-2724707182
- (2018) La Horde d'Or et l'islamisation des steppes eurasiatiques (Presses Universitaires de Provence, Aix-en-Provence) ISBN 9791032001820
- (2020) La Horde d'or - les héritiers de Gengis Khan (Petit à petit, [Rouen], DL 2020) (illustrated by Laurent Seigneuret) ISBN 9782918098164
- (2021) The Horde: How the Mongols Changed the World (Harvard University Press)
- (2023) La Horde, comment les Mongols ont changé le monde ? (Paris, Perrin)
