= Dominican Church and Convent of St. James, Sandomierz =

Church building in Sandomierz, Poland

Coordinates: 50°40′41″N 21°44′26″E

Dominican Church and Convent of St. James, Shrine of Blessed Sadok and 48 Dominican martyrs, Shrine of Our Lady of Rosary
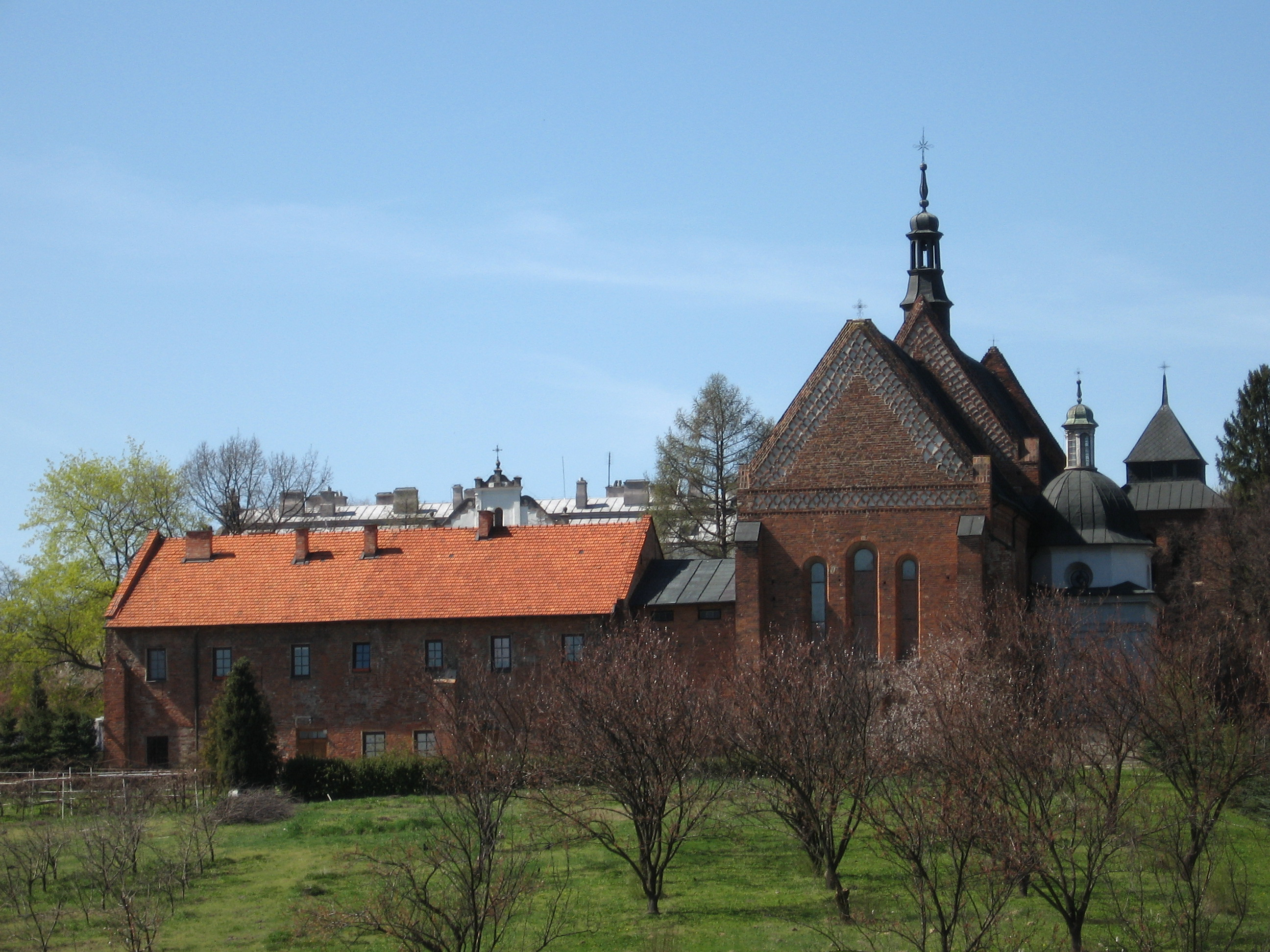
- View from the Sandomierz Main Square

Religion
- Affiliation: Roman Catholic
- Province: Świętokrzyskie Voivodeship / Roman Catholic Diocese of Sandomierz
- Region: Sandomierz
- Rite: Latin

Location
- State: Poland
- Interactive map of Dominican Church and Convent of St. James, Shrine of Blessed Sadok and 48 Dominican martyrs, Shrine of Our Lady of Rosary

Architecture
- Completed: around 1211

The Church of St. James in Sandomierz, also known as the Shrine of Blessed Sadok and 48 Dominican martyrs, Monastery of Dominicans (Convent of St. James), Shrine of Our Lady of the Rosary, is one of the oldest brick churches in Poland (and probably in Europe) and the second oldest Dominican monastery in Poland (after the monastery in Cracow). This church is a unique indirect form of Romano-Gothic style. The Roman ceramic decorations on the outside gabled walls are unusual and beautifully done. The stained glass windows inside are date from 1910 to 1918. "The decoration and portal ... are particularly notable."

== Dominican Order ==
This was the second priory founded in Poland by Saint Hyacinth. During the Golden Horde invasion of Poland in 1260, Sadok and 48 other Dominicans were murdered by Mongols soldiers there. Because of this martyrdom, the Polish Dominican friars may use red belts in their habits. There is also a holy icon of Our Lady of the Rosary - the title of Mary that is the most important to the Order. After the January Uprising, Dominican friars were thrown out by the Russian administration during the Partition. They returned to Sandomierz in 2001.

== The Lesser Polish Way ==
In this church, The Lesser Polish Way of St. James to Santiago de Compostela has its beginning. In medieval times it was an important stop for the pilgrims from Eastern and Northern Europe.

== See also ==
- Church of the Assumption of Mary in Tarnobrzeg - around 14 km direction south
- ex-Dominican Church of St. Mery and St. Hyacinth in Klimontów - around 15 km direction south-west
- Second Mongol invasion of Poland
