= Wielka Wieś, Starachowice County =

Wielka Wieś
- Village
- Location within Poland
- Coordinates: 51°4′19″N 20°59′9″E
- Country: Poland
- Voivodeship: Świętokrzyskie
- County: Starachowice
- Gmina: Wąchock
- Population: 1,425

Wielka Wieś [ˈvjɛlka ˈvjɛɕ] is a village in the administrative district of Gmina Wąchock, within Starachowice County, Świętokrzyskie Voivodeship, in south-central Poland. It lies approximately 2 km (1 mi) west of Wąchock, 7 km (4 mi) north-west of Starachowice, and 34 km (21 mi) north-east of the regional capital Kielce.
