= Parszów =

- Village
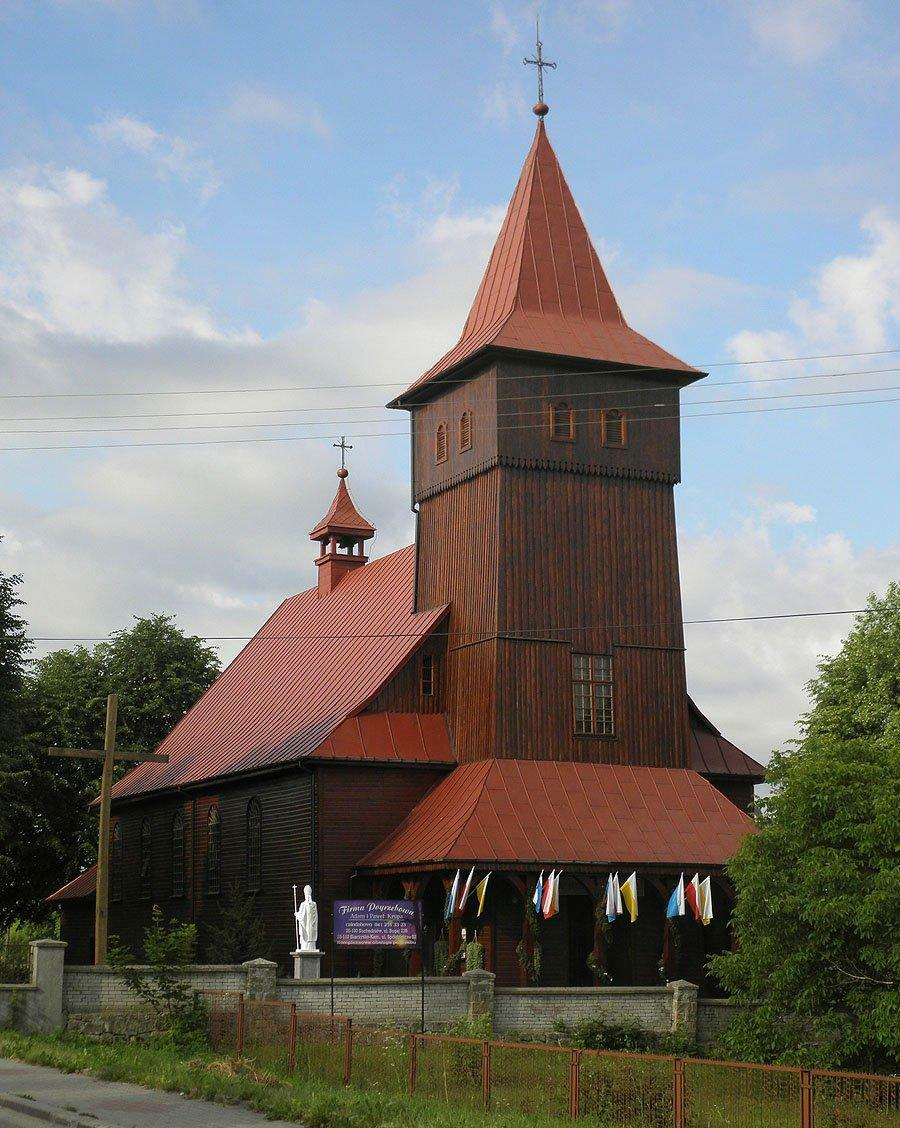
- Church of the Pentecost

- Location within Poland
- Coordinates: 51°4′28″N 20°56′8″E
- Country: Poland
- Voivodeship: Świętokrzyskie
- County: Starachowice
- Gmina: Wąchock

Population
  - Total: 1,720

Parszów [ˈparʂuf] is a village in the administrative district of Gmina Wąchock, within Starachowice County, Świętokrzyskie Voivodeship, in south-central Poland. It lies approximately 6 km (4 mi) west of Wąchock, 10 km (6 mi) west of Starachowice, and 31 km (19 mi) north-east of the regional capital Kielce.
