= Rataje, Świętokrzyskie Voivodeship =

Rataje
- Village
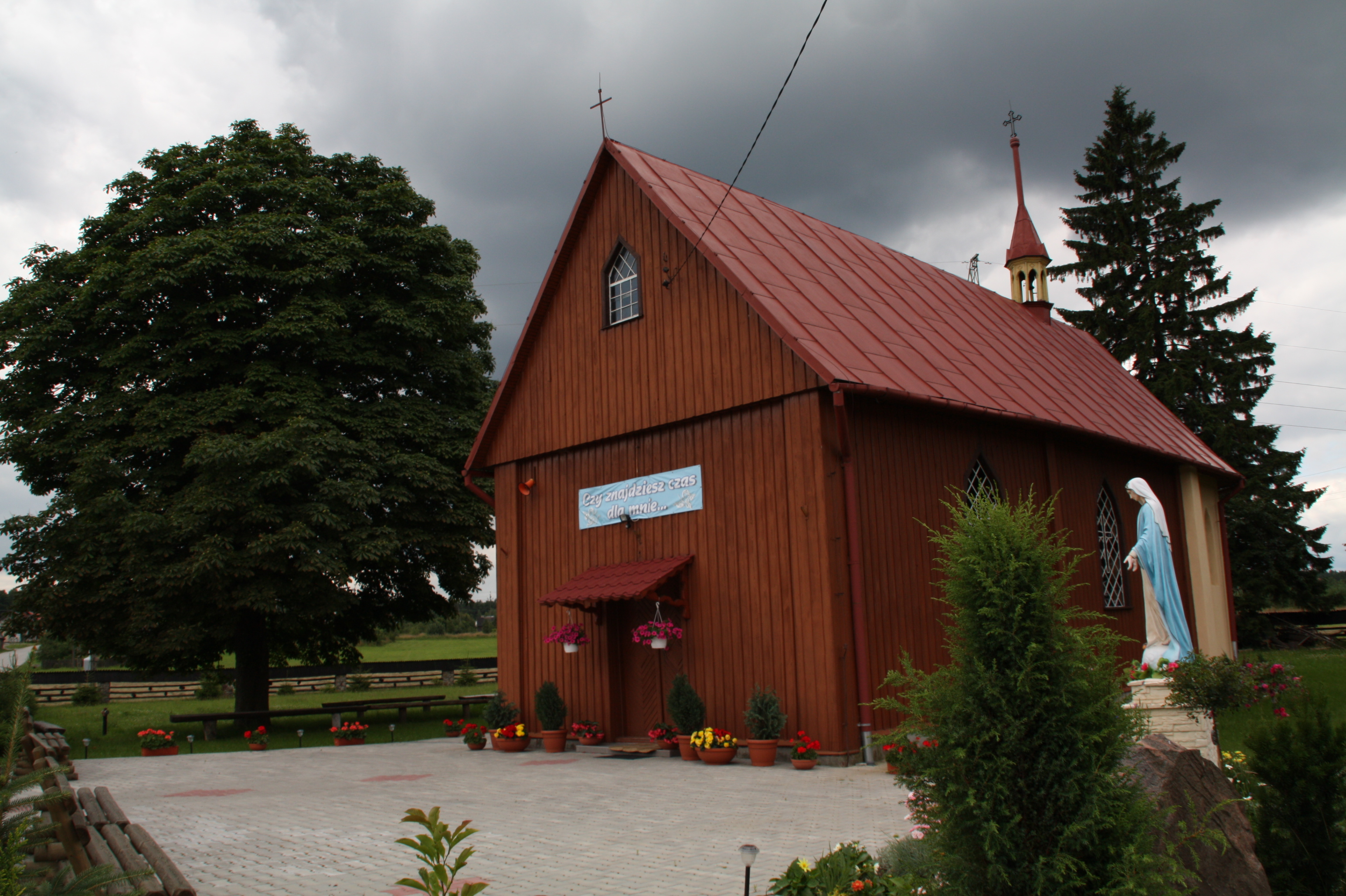
- Chapel

- Location within Poland
- Coordinates: 51°3′28″N 21°0′43″E
- Country: Poland
- Voivodeship: Świętokrzyskie
- County: Starachowice
- Gmina: Wąchock
- Population: 425

Rataje [raˈtajɛ] is a village in the administrative district of Gmina Wąchock, within Starachowice County, Świętokrzyskie Voivodeship, in south-central Poland. It lies approximately 2 km (1 mi) south of Wąchock, 4 km (2 mi) west of Starachowice, and 34 km (21 mi) north-east of the regional capital Kielce.
