= Marcinków, Świętokrzyskie Voivodeship =

Marcinków
- Village
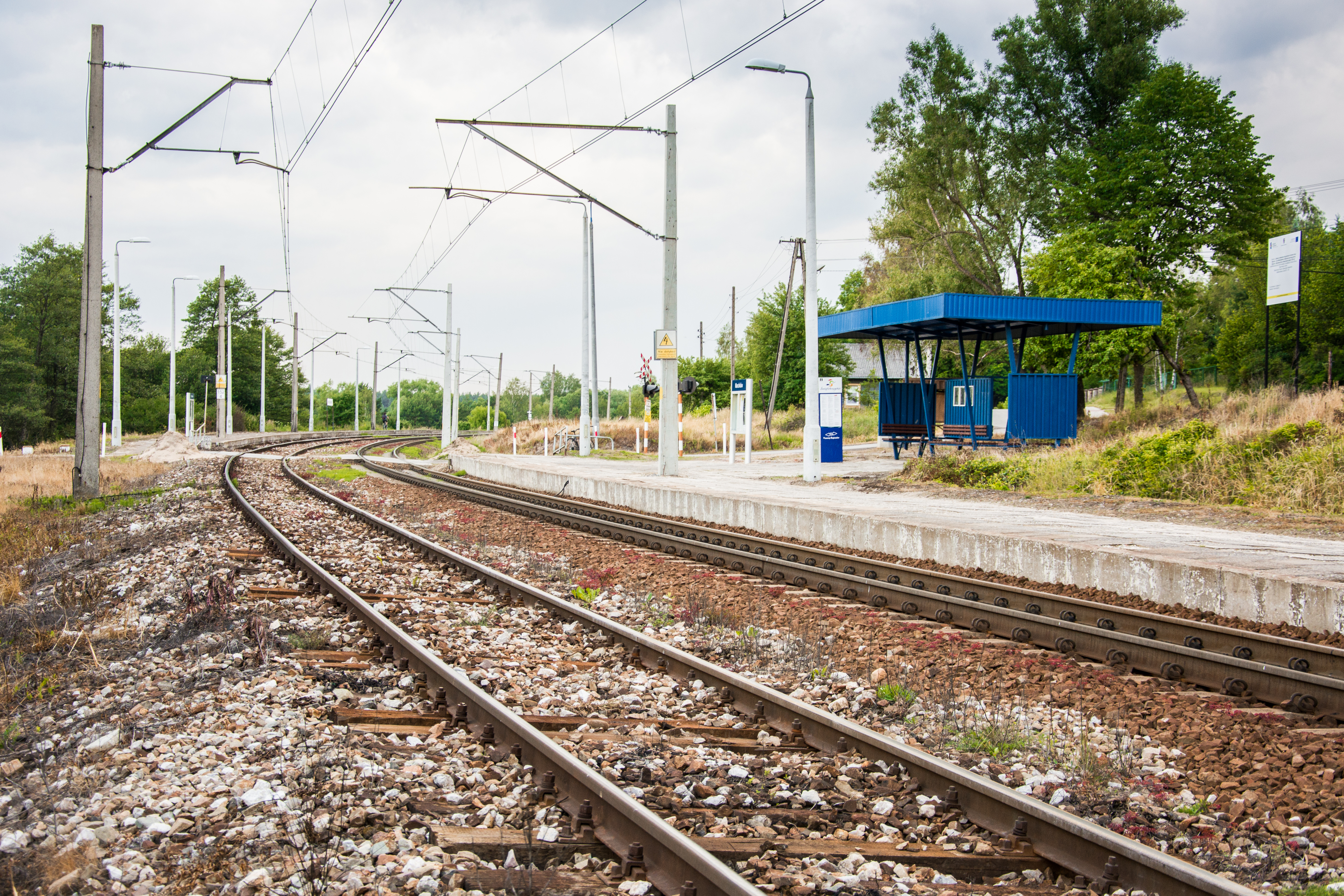
- Train stop in Marcinków

- Location within Poland
- Coordinates: 51°5′29″N 20°58′32″E
- Country: Poland
- Voivodeship: Świętokrzyskie
- County: Starachowice
- Gmina: Wąchock
- Population: 674
- Time zone: UTC+1 (CET)
  - Summer (DST): UTC+2 (CEST)
- Vehicle registration: TST

Marcinków [marˈt͡ɕiŋkuf] is a village in the administrative district of Gmina Wąchock, within Starachowice County, Świętokrzyskie Voivodeship, in south-central Poland. It lies approximately 4 km (2 mi) north-west of Wąchock, 8 km (5 mi) north-west of Starachowice, and 35 km (22 mi) north-east of the regional capital Kielce.

Marcinków was the location of several Paleolithic industrial sites, which are now archaeological sites, part of the Rydno Archaeological Reserve, consisting of several hundred former Paleolithic sites stretching from Skarżysko-Kamienna to Wąchock. The sites were discovered in 1921.
