= Sadok and 48 Dominican martyrs from Sandomierz =

Roman Catholic, Dominican martyrs killed by Mongols

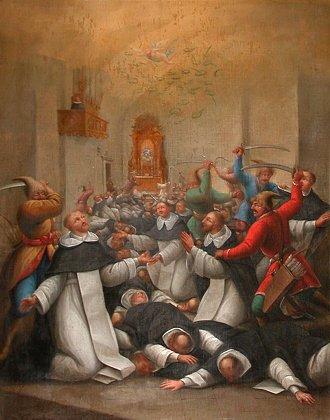
- 17th-century painting, chapel in Sandomierz St. James' church
- Died: 2 February 1260; Sandomierz
- Beatified: 18 October 1807, Rome by Pius VII
- Major shrine: Dominican Church and Convent of St. James in Sandomierz
- Feast: 2 June (former 29 October)

Sadok and 48 Dominican martyrs from Sandomierz were Roman Catholic, Dominican martyrs killed by Mongols (Golden Horde) during the Second Mongol invasion of Poland in 1260. As homage to the deaths of these martyrs, Polish Dominican friars were given special dispensation allowing the usage of red belts in their habits.

== List of martyrs ==
1. Blessed Sadok – prior, priest
2. Blessed Malachy – preacher, priest
3. Blessed Paul – vicar, priest
4. Blessed Andrew – questor, priest
5. Blessed Peter – priest
6. Blessed James – priest
7. Blessed Abel – receivership, priest
8. Blessed Simon – priest
9. Blessed Clemens – priest
10. Blessed Barnaba (I) – priest
11. Blessed Elijah – priest
12. Blessed Bartholomew – priest
13. Blessed Lukas – priest
14. Blessed Matthew – priest
15. Blessed John – priest
16. Blessed Barnaba (II) – priest
17. Blessed Philip – priest
18. Blessed Onuphrius – cleric (seminary student)
19. Blessed Dominic – cleric (seminary student)
20. Blessed Michael – cleric (seminary student)
21. Blessed Matthew – cleric (seminary student)
22. Blessed Maur – cleric (seminary student)
23. Blessed Timothy – cleric (seminary student)
24. Blessed Gordian – profes
25. Blessed Felician – profes
26. Blessed Mark – profes
27. Blessed John – profes
28. Blessed Ghervaz – profes
29. Blessed Christopher – profes
30. Blessed Donatus – profes
31. Blessed Medart – profes
32. Blessed Valentinus – profes
33. Blessed Joachim – deacon
34. Blessed Joseph – deacon
35. Blessed Stephen – subdeacon
36. Blessed Thaddeus – subdeacon
37. Blessed Moses – subdeacon
38. Blessed Abraham – subdeacon
39. Blessed Basil – subdeacon
40. Blessed David – cleric (seminary student)
41. Blessed Aaron – cleric (seminary student)
42. Blessed Benedict – cleric (seminary student)
43. Blessed Daniel – novice
44. Blessed Tobias – novice
45. Blessed Makarios – novice
46. Blessed Raphael – novice
47. Blessed Isaiah – novice
48. Blessed Cyril – novice
49. Blessed Jeremiah (Sutor?)

== See also ==
- Sack of Sandomierz (1260)
- Lesser Poland Way
