= Węglów =

- Village
- Location within Poland
- Coordinates: 51°3′37″N 20°59′1″E
- Country: Poland
- Voivodeship: Świętokrzyskie
- County: Starachowice
- Gmina: Wąchock
- Population: 257

Węglów [ˈvɛŋɡluf] is a village in the administrative district of Gmina Wąchock, within Starachowice County, Świętokrzyskie Voivodeship, in south-central Poland. It lies approximately 3 km (2 mi) south-west of Wąchock, 6 km (4 mi) west of Starachowice, and 33 km (21 mi) north-east of the regional capital Kielce.
