= Wąchock Abbey =

Cistercian abbey in Wąchock, Poland

Coordinates: 51.074167°N 21.013611°E

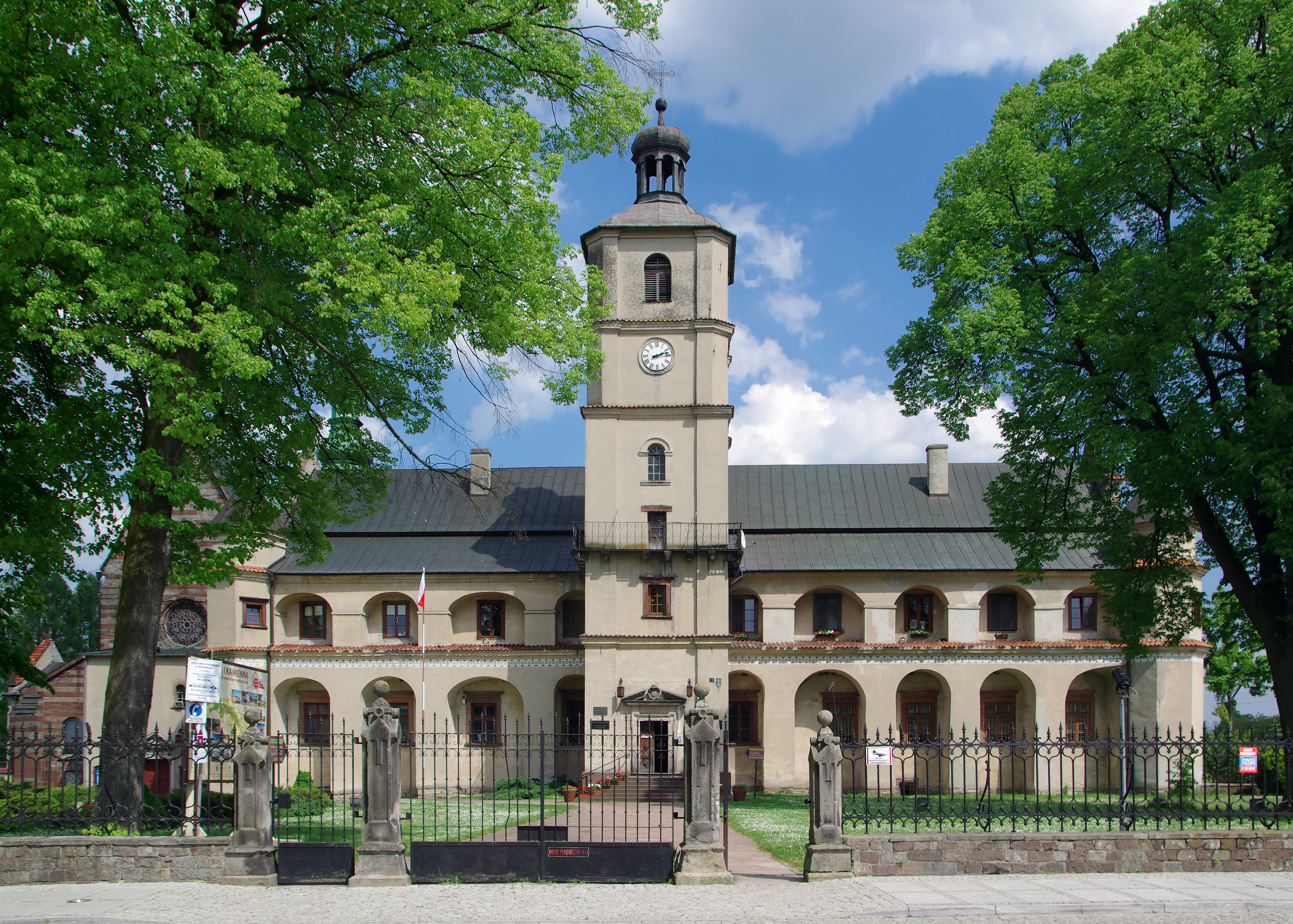
Wąchock Abbey

Wąchock Abbey (Polish: Opactwo Cystersów w Wąchocku) is a Cistercian abbey in Wąchock, Poland. Located near the larger town of Starachowice in the Świętokrzyskie Mountains of south-eastern Poland, Wąchock is best known for the architecture of this Roman Catholic site.

The abbey was founded by Cistercian monks, who came to the region in the late 12th century. The Cistercians had a reputation for administering the building sites for abbeys and cathedrals, and "made it a point of honour to recruit the best stonecutters." Today, the interiors of the abbey remain well-preserved, and the buildings themselves "are recognized as the most precious monuments of Romanesque architecture in Poland."

== History ==
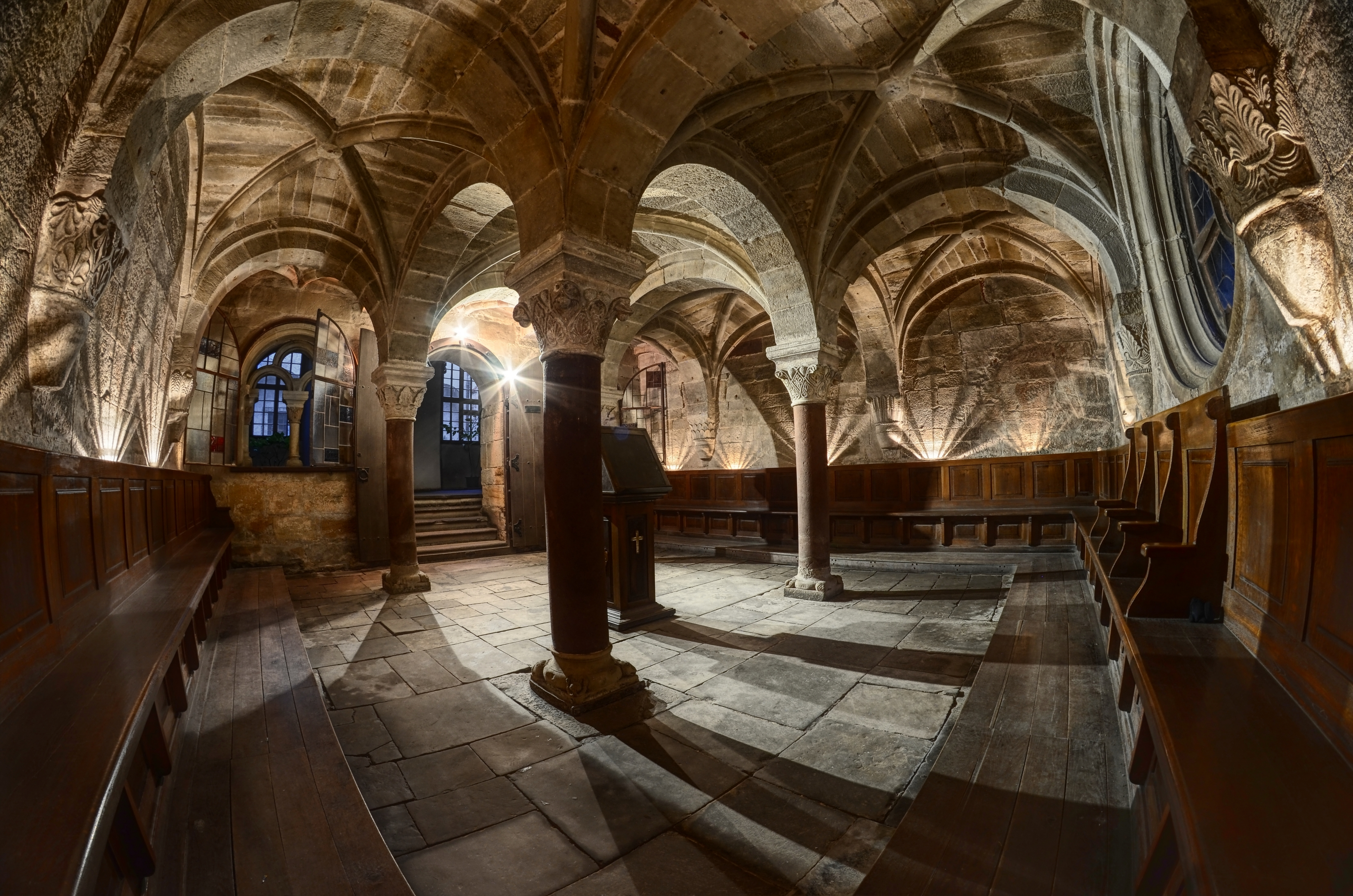
Chapter house

The abbey itself is believed to have been founded in 1179, based on the few extant records from the era. It is further presumed, on the evidence of a stone escutcheon of Gadka (or Gadko), Bishop of Kraków, by the entrance to the later-built church on the grounds, that he was the principal founder. The church, dedicated to the Blessed Virgin Mary and Saint Florian, was completed prior to the Tatar Invasion of 1241. This incursion, and the Mongol invasions to follow, destroyed most of the monastery, and the bulk of what Romanesque work stands today was rebuilt in the late 13th century.

The abbey, like many Cistercian monasteries, prospered over the next several centuries, farming and earning income from metal mining and manufacturing operations. Another series of invasions, culminating with that of George II Rákóczi of Transylvania, left the abbey plundered and burnt. The monastery was finally rebuilt in 1696. It was suppressed, and the church converted to a parish church, in 1819 following the Congress of Vienna, which had created the "Kingdom of Poland" five years earlier as a de facto puppet state of the Russian Empire under the Romanov Tsars. In 1951, Cistercians from Mogila were finally able to return to the monastery at Wąchock, and in 1964 the parish once again returned to its former status as an abbey. In 1991, the Fathers opened a museum on the abbey premises.
