= Sack of Sandomierz (1260) =

Siege & destruction of Polish city by Mongol invaders in 1259 - 1260

- Part of Second Mongol invasion of Poland
Date	1260
Location	Sandomierz, Lesser Poland
Result	Mongol–Ruthenian victory

Belligerents
Mongol Empire; Kingdom of Galicia–Volhynia	Kingdom of Poland

Commanders and leaders
Burundai	Unknown

Casualties and losses
Unknown	Heavy

The siege and second sack of Sandomierz (Ruthenian: Sudomir) took place in 1259–1260 during the second Mongol invasion of Poland. The city was razed and residents massacred.

Sandomierz, the most important city of southeastern medieval Kingdom of Poland, and the second largest city of Lesser Poland, was captured by the invaders on 2 February 1260. The Mongol and Ruthenian armies completely destroyed the city, murdering almost all residents, including 49 Dominican friars with their abbot Sadok, who hid in the St. Jacob church (see Sadok and 48 Dominican martyrs from Sandomierz). As a result, old Sandomierz, located on the Staromiejskie Hill, ceased to exist.

According to a legend, before the sack the Mongols sent a Ruthenian envoy to Sandomierz, promising Castellan Piotr Krepa that the city would be spared if its residents gave away their valuables. Krepa decided to negotiate with the invaders, and entered the Mongol camp, where he was murdered.

The sack itself is described in the Galician–Volhynian Chronicle, where Sandomierz is called Sudomir. There is no mention of Ruthenian troops supporting the "Tatars" attacking the city.

In 1286, High Duke of Poland Leszek II the Black decided to rebuild Sandomierz in a new location, more convenient for defence.The city once again received its Magdeburg rights (the original document still exists), and its first wojt was a nobleman named Witkon. Duke Leszek also invited Dominican friars from other locations, giving them a plot of land within city limits.

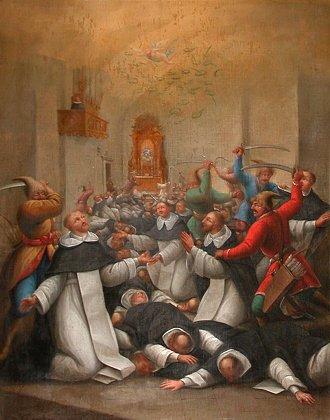
17th-century painting of the death of Sadok and 48 Dominican martyrs of Sandomierz.

In the 1950s and 1960s, Polish archaeologists found mass graves with human bones, located near the St. Jacob church. After extensive research, it was concluded that they were victims of the 1260 invasion. The bones are now kept in the cellar of the church.

== Bibliography ==
=== Primary sources ===
- Galician–Volhynian Chronicle (c. 1292)
  - Perfecky, George A. (1973). The Hypatian Codex Part Two: The Galician–Volynian Chronicle. An annotated translation by George A. Perfecky. Munich: Wilhelm Fink Verlag. OCLC 902306.

=== Literature ===
- Stanisław Krakowski, Polska w walce z najazdami tatarskimi w XIII wieku [Poland in the fight against the Tatar invasions in the 13th century], MON, 1956, pp. 181–201.
