= Romanesque–Gothic transition =

Medieval architectural style

St Cross Hospital, Winchester (c.1160s). The church combines rounded and pointed arches with elaborate carving.

Over the course of the 12th and 13th centuries, in European architecture, the new French Gothic style replaced the preceding Romanesque style. This process took several decades (the precise dates varying between regions), and in this period buildings were erected that blended Romanesque and Early Gothic features. This intermediate style is referred to by a variety of names, including "Transitional" in Britain and "Romano-Gothic" in the Netherlands and Rhineland. Romanesque features used included round arches, thick walls and chevron (zigzag) carving, while Gothic features included pointed arches, rib vaults and thinner, more elegant mouldings.

== The Netherlands ==
In the northern provinces of the Netherlands, especially Groningen, many churches were built in this style from 1250 until 1350. Typical for this style are the walls and gables of brick that are richly decorated with blind arcading. An early example of this group is found in Leermens, where in c.1250 a new choir was added to a Romanesque church, using only rounded arches. The choir also has a domical ribbed vault.

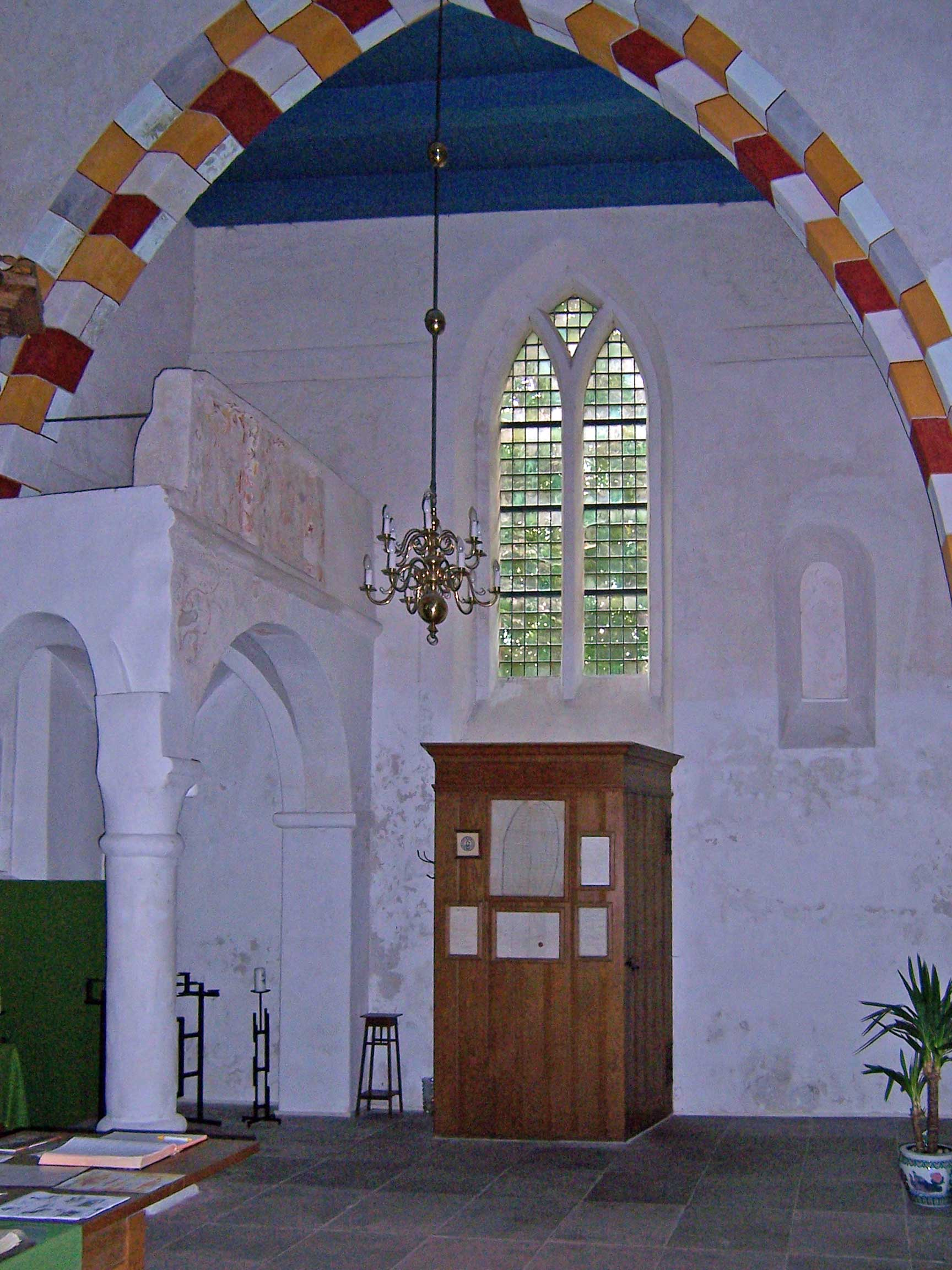
Inside of the Church of Leermens

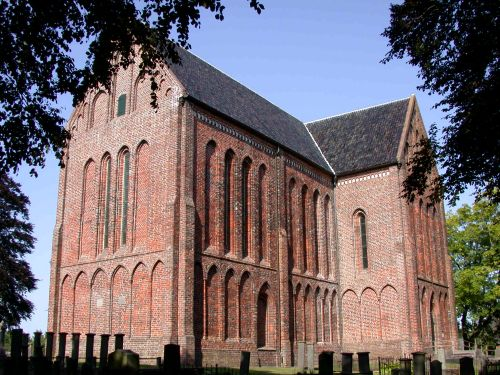
Petruschurch of Zuidbroek

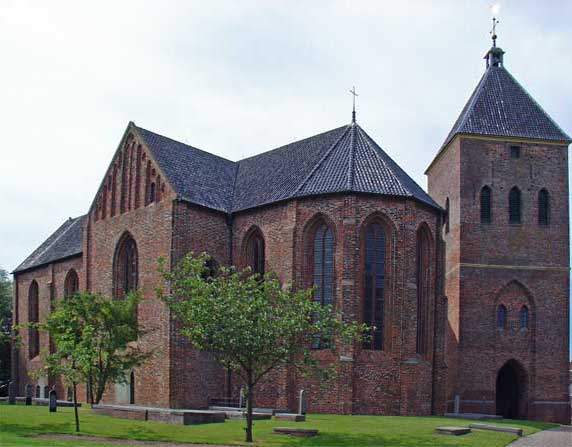
Jacobschurch of Zeerijp

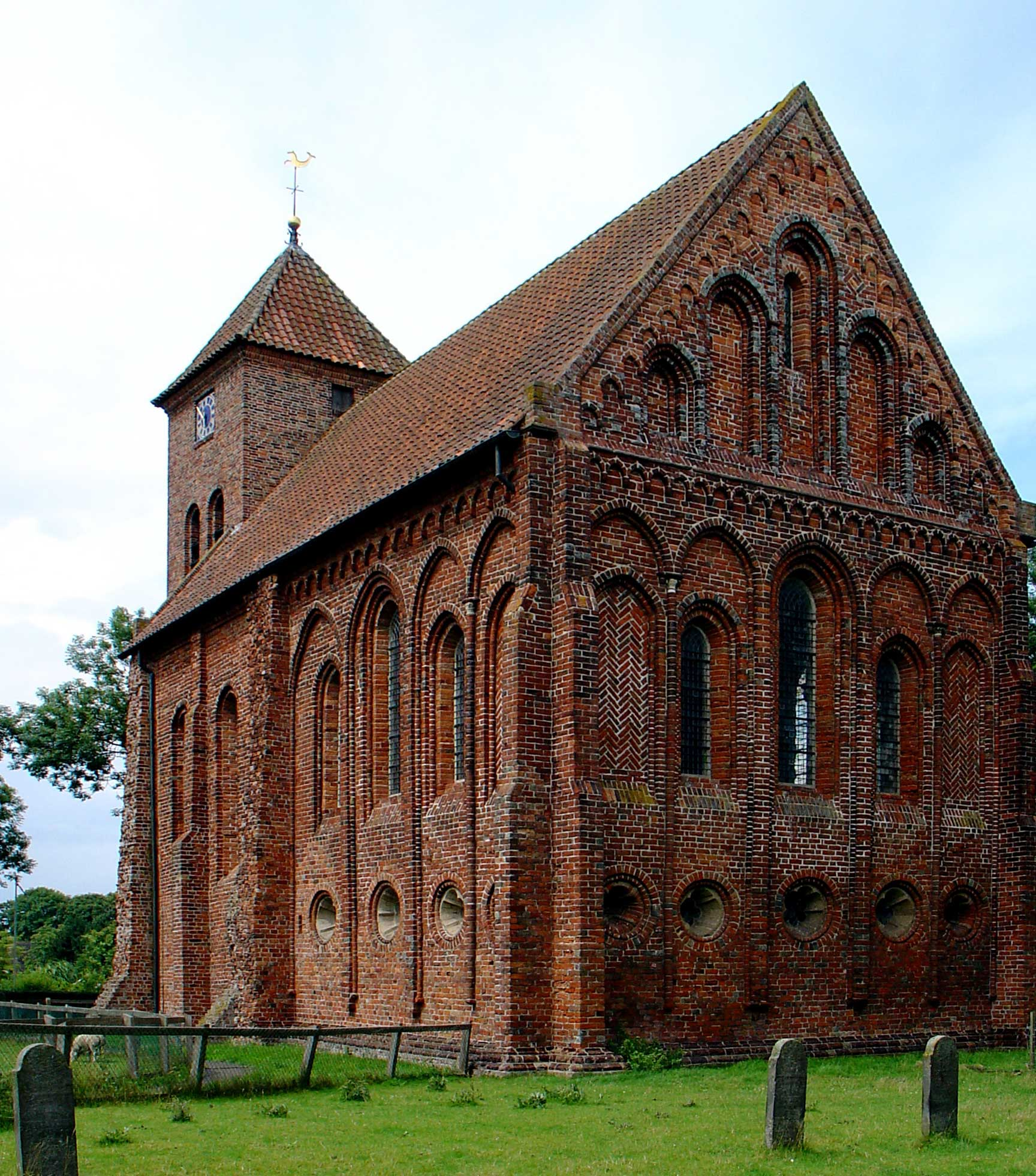
Ursuschurch of Termunten

== The Rhineland ==
The late-Romanesque style (German: Spätromanik) of the Rhineland has often been called Romano-Gothic. This can particularly be seen in Limburg Cathedral in Limburg an der Lahn which combines round arches and Gothic rib vaults.

Paderborn Cathedral is a hall church (i.e. with three naves instead of one) completed in 1270. The 93m high bell tower dates from the 12th century and is characterised by the 18 niches on each of its façade, as well as four roofed turrets at each corner. The crypt, with a length of 32 metres, is one of the largest in Germany, and contains the relics of St Liborius.

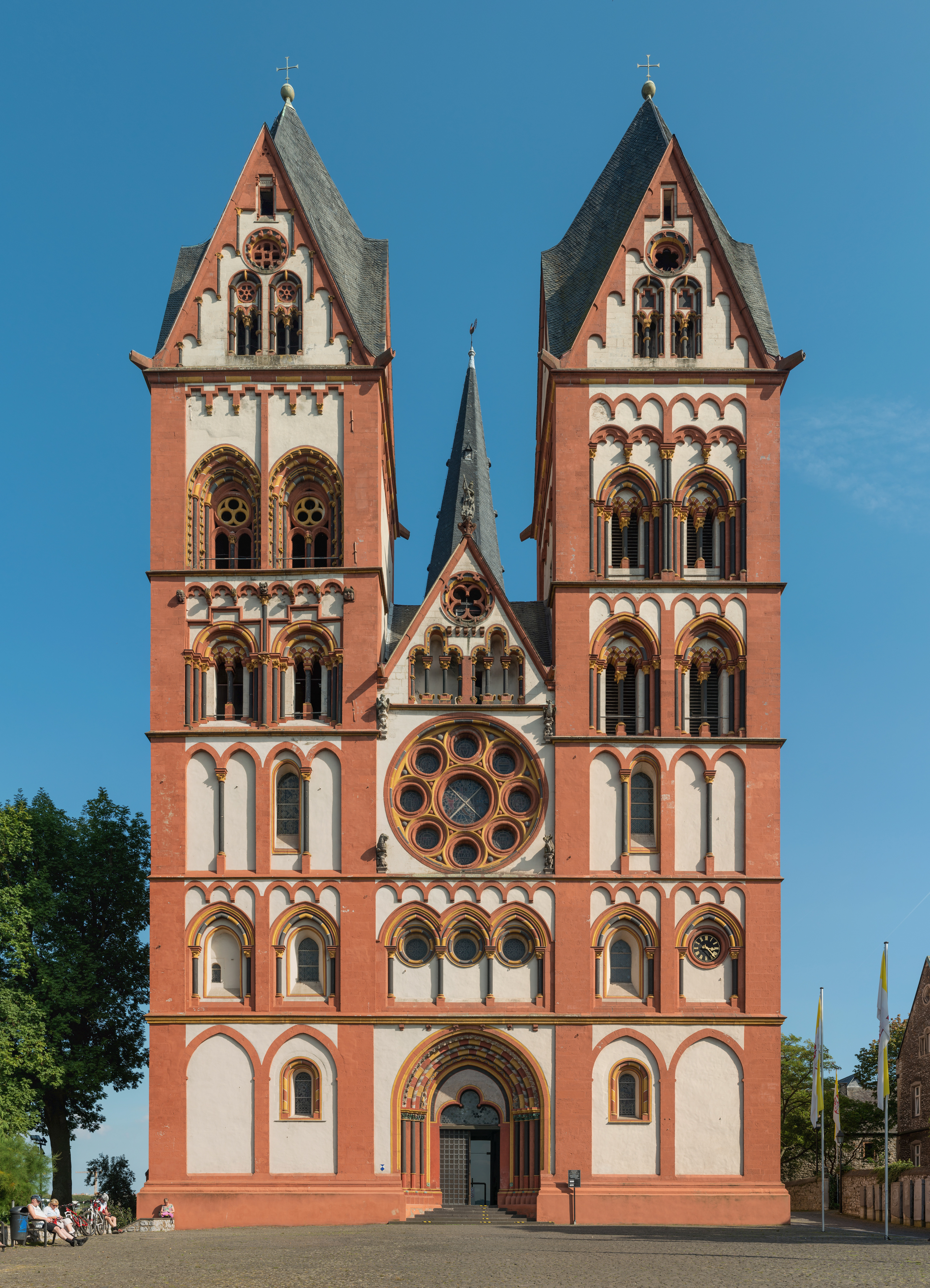
Façade of Limburg Cathedral

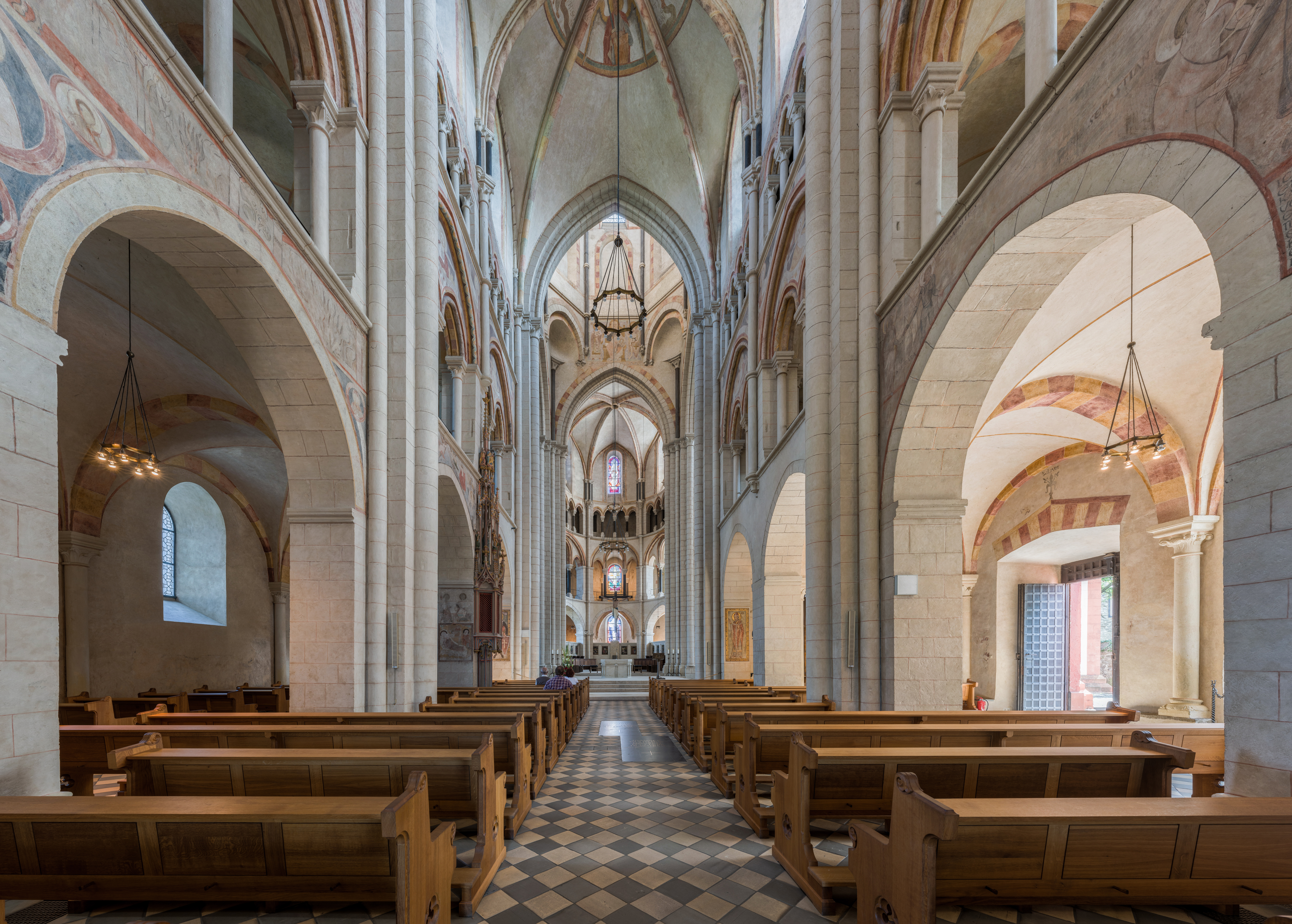
The cathedral's interior, looking east

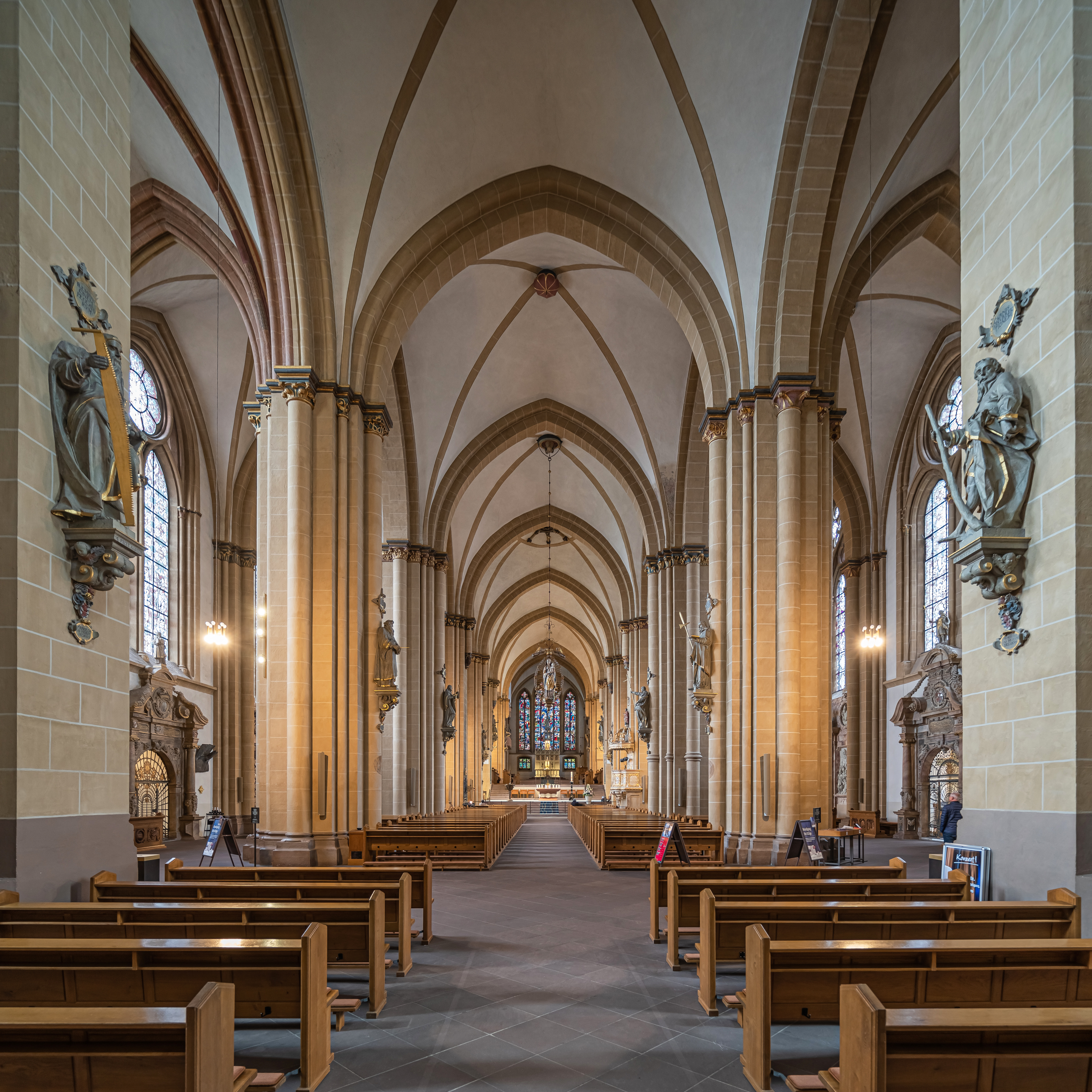
Paderborn Cathedral

== Secular architecture ==
Conisbrough Castle, Yorkshire. The design is still based on a keep, but both it and the outer turrets are round. The six square buttresses flanking the keep are unique.

While most surviving buildings in the style are churches and monastic complexes, castles and houses also combined Romanesque and Gothic features. In military architecture, the change from Romanesque to Gothic arches and ornamentation was paralleled by a transition from the early medieval form, which was based on a central keep and used square towers, to the high medieval form, in which defensive strength was concentrated in round towers on the curtain wall. As designers experimented, castle forms varied greatly. For example, Dover (1179 onwards) has a very large square keep, but with extensive outer defences, while Pembroke (c.1200) has a seemingly uninhabitable round donjon, and Framlingham (1190s) has no keep at all, just a curtain wall with thirteen square towers.

As masons worked on sacred and secular projects indiscriminately, high-quality secular buildings could incorporate decorative features similar to those of cathedrals. For example, the chapel in the keep of Newcastle Castle incorporates varied chevron in a manner popular in the grander late-Romanesque churches of England, while the chapels in Dover Castle keep and the great hall in Oakham Castle have newer French Gothic forms, probably installed by the masons who were rebuilding Canterbury Cathedral in the Gothic style.

== Other examples of a mix between Romanesque and Gothic style ==
=== Kołbacz, Poland ===
The Cistercian abbey in Kołbacz includes a Romanesque-Gothic church (1210–1347).

=== Sandomierz, Poland ===
The 13th century Dominican Church and Convent of St. James in Sandomierz is the oldest brick church in Poland.

=== France ===
Combining ribbed vaults and the Romanesque tradition, the cathedrals of Angers (1149–1159) and Poitiers (1162) exemplify a transitional Gothic style, more austere and less well lit.

=== Cremona, Italy ===
The Cremona Baptistery (Italian: Battistero di Cremona) is a religious edifice in Cremona, northern Italy. It is annexed to the city's Cathedral. Built in 1167, it is characterized by an octagonal plan, a reference to the cult of St. Ambrose of Milan, symbolizing the Eight Day of Resurrection and, thenceforth, the Baptism. The edifice mixes Romanesque and Lombard-Gothic styles, the latter evident in the preference for bare brickwork walls.

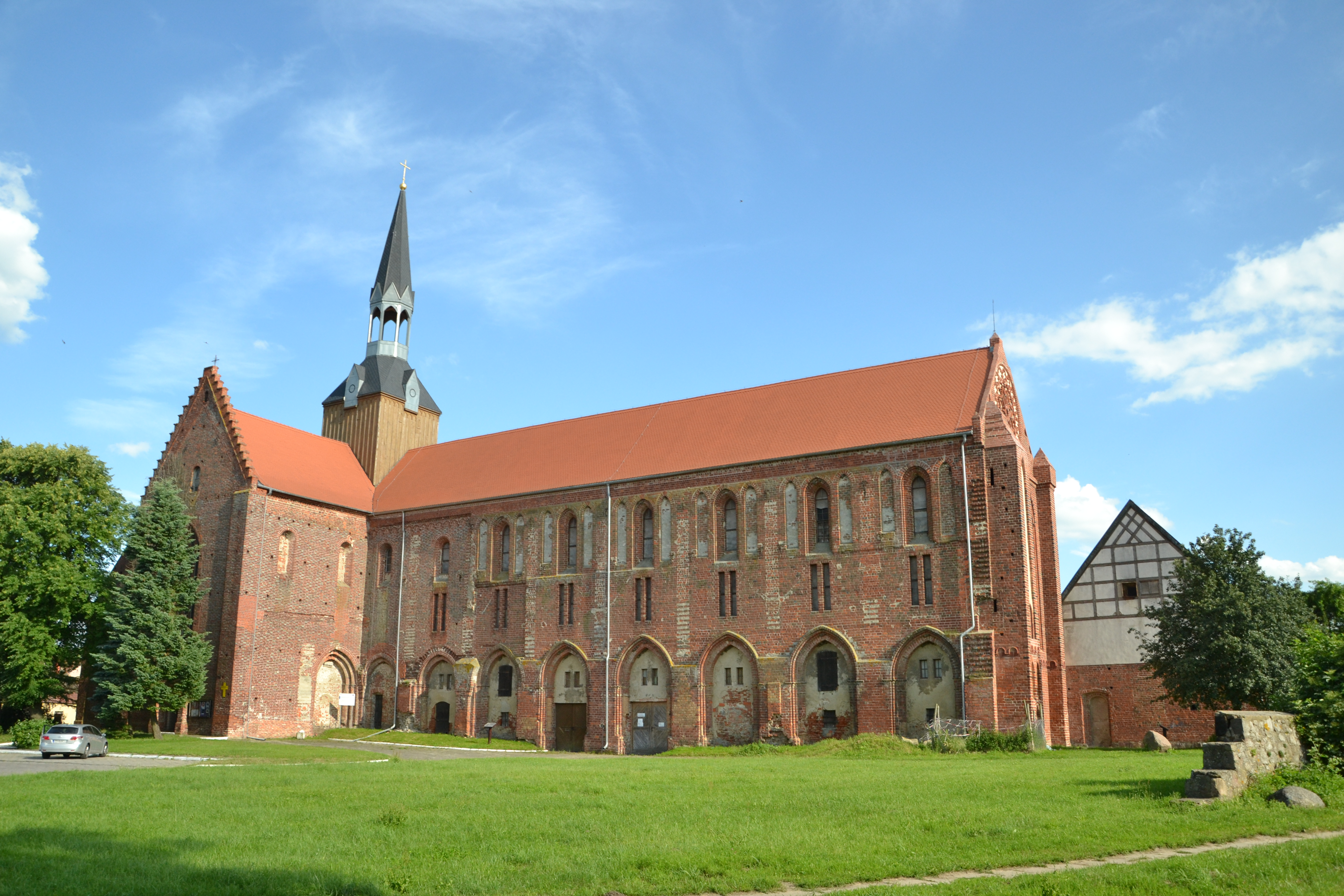
Cistercian abbey of Kołbacz

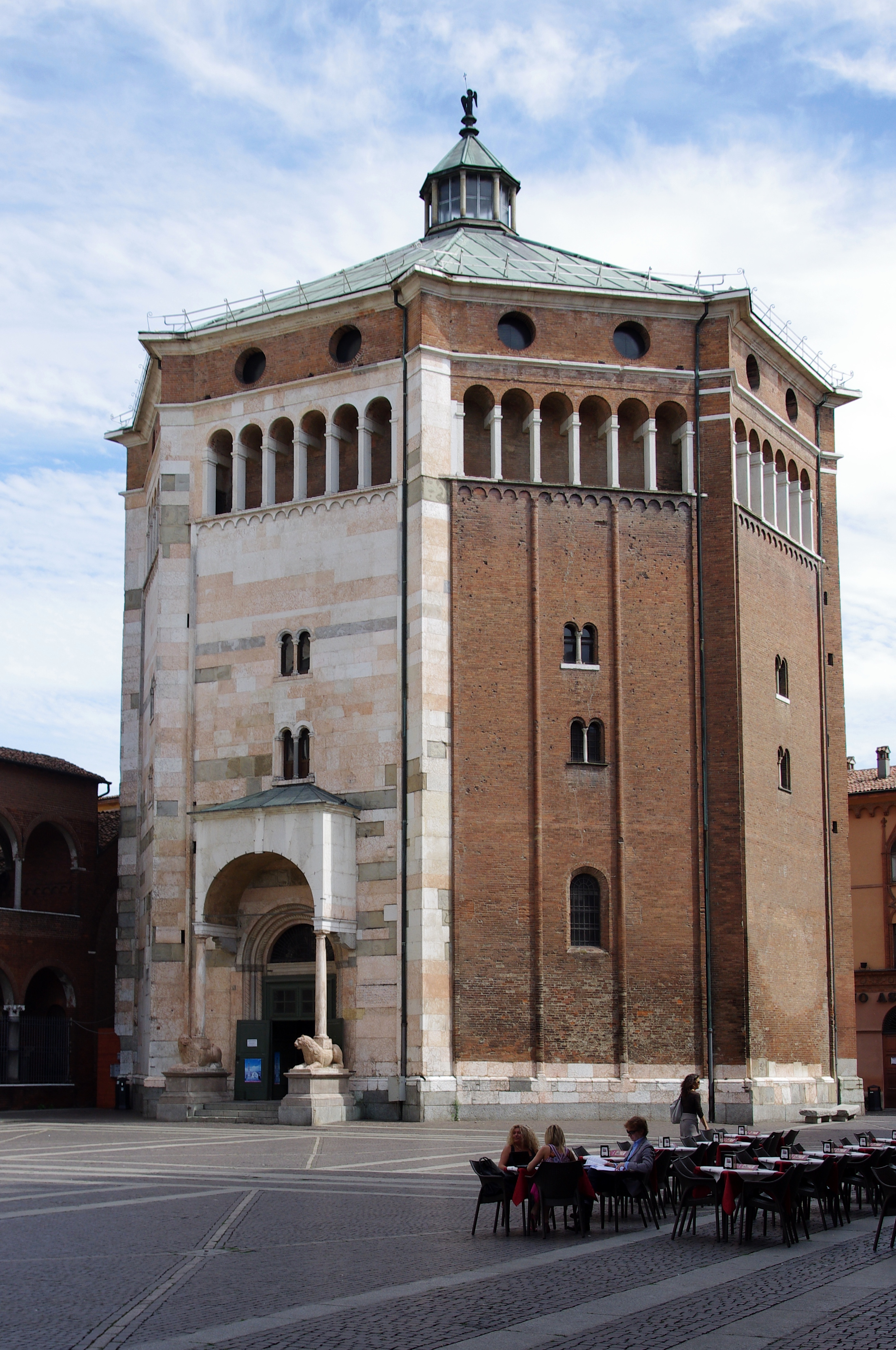
The baptistery of Cremona

== Gallery ==
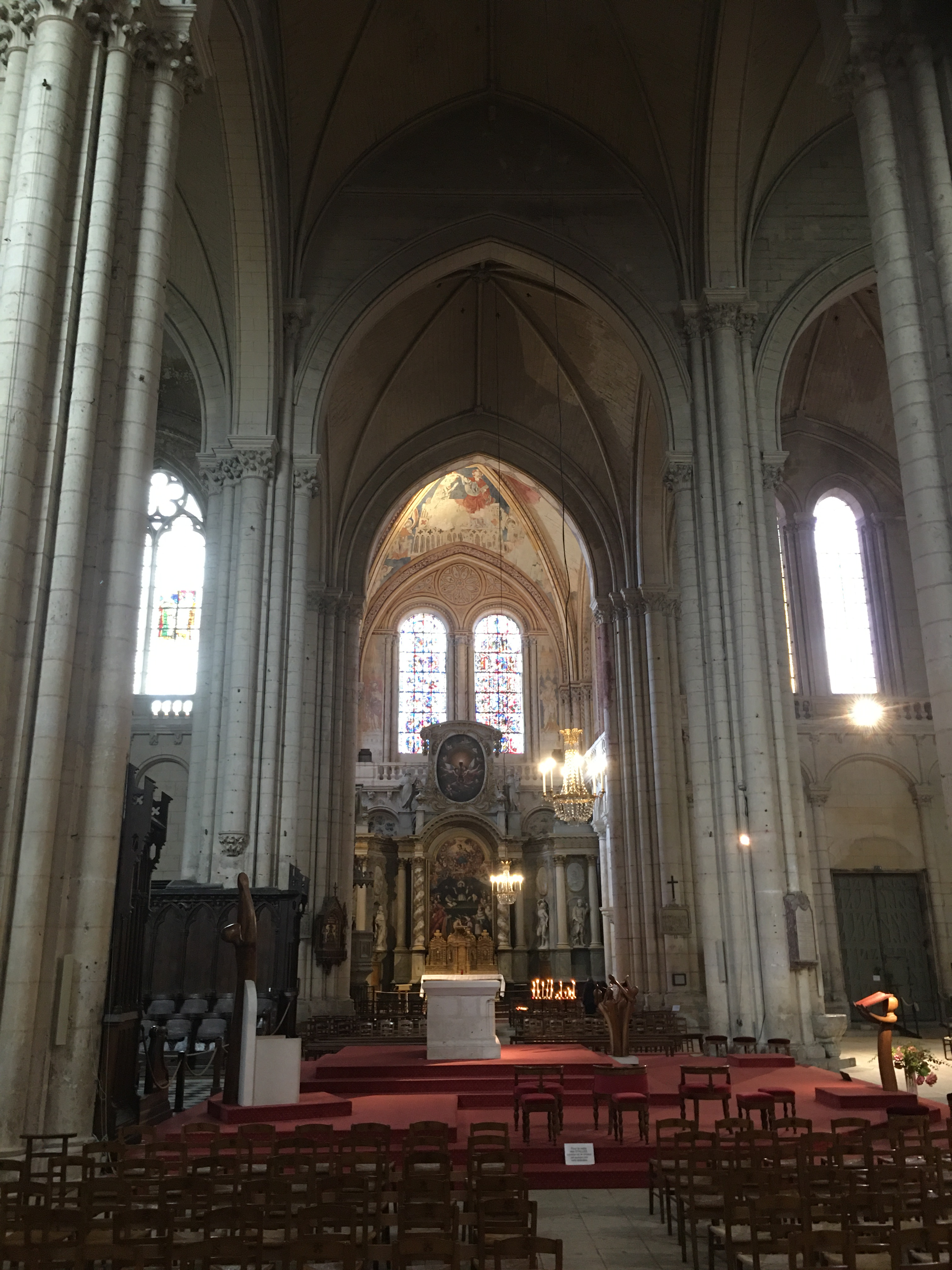
Poitiers Cathedral

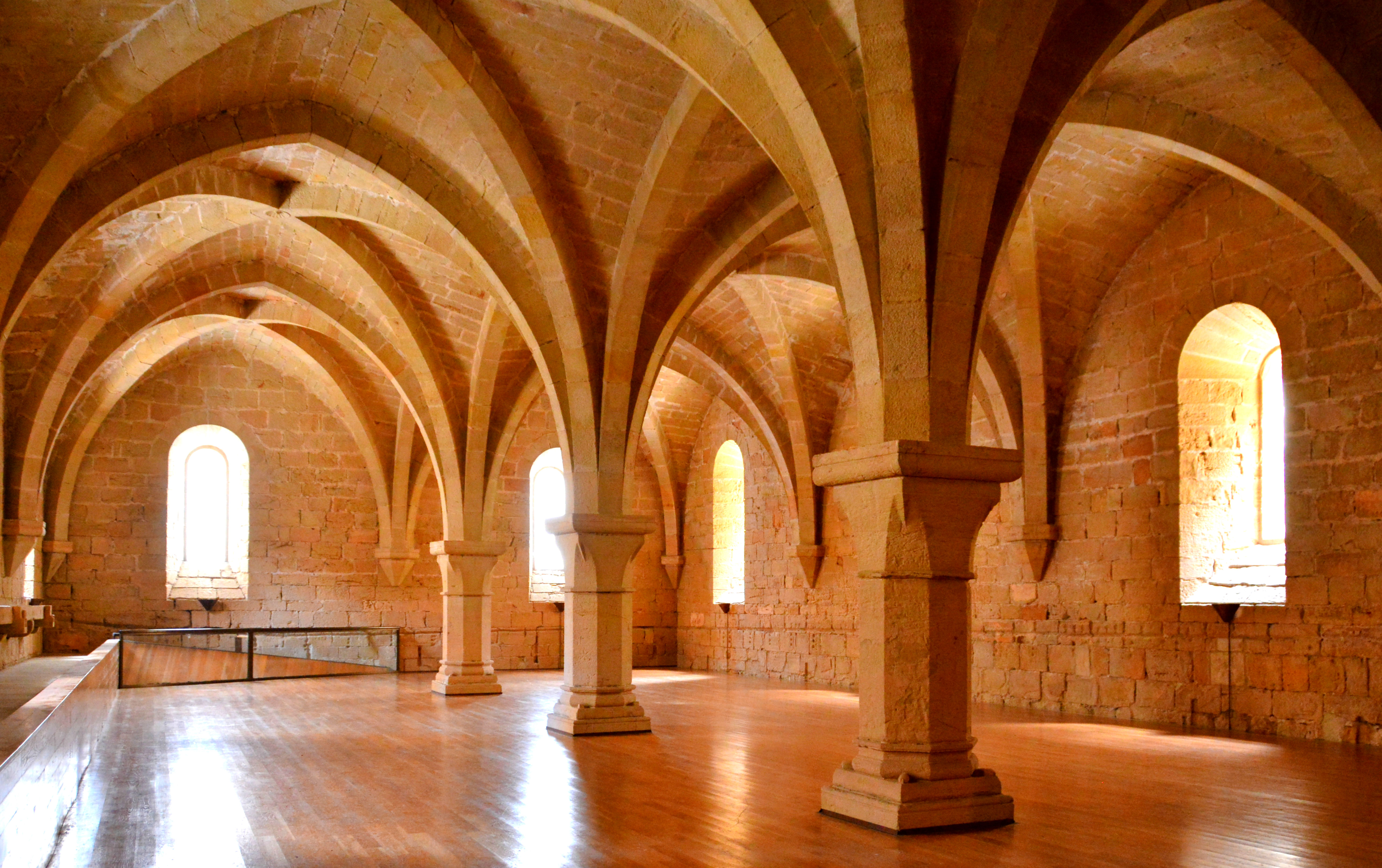
Poblet Abbey

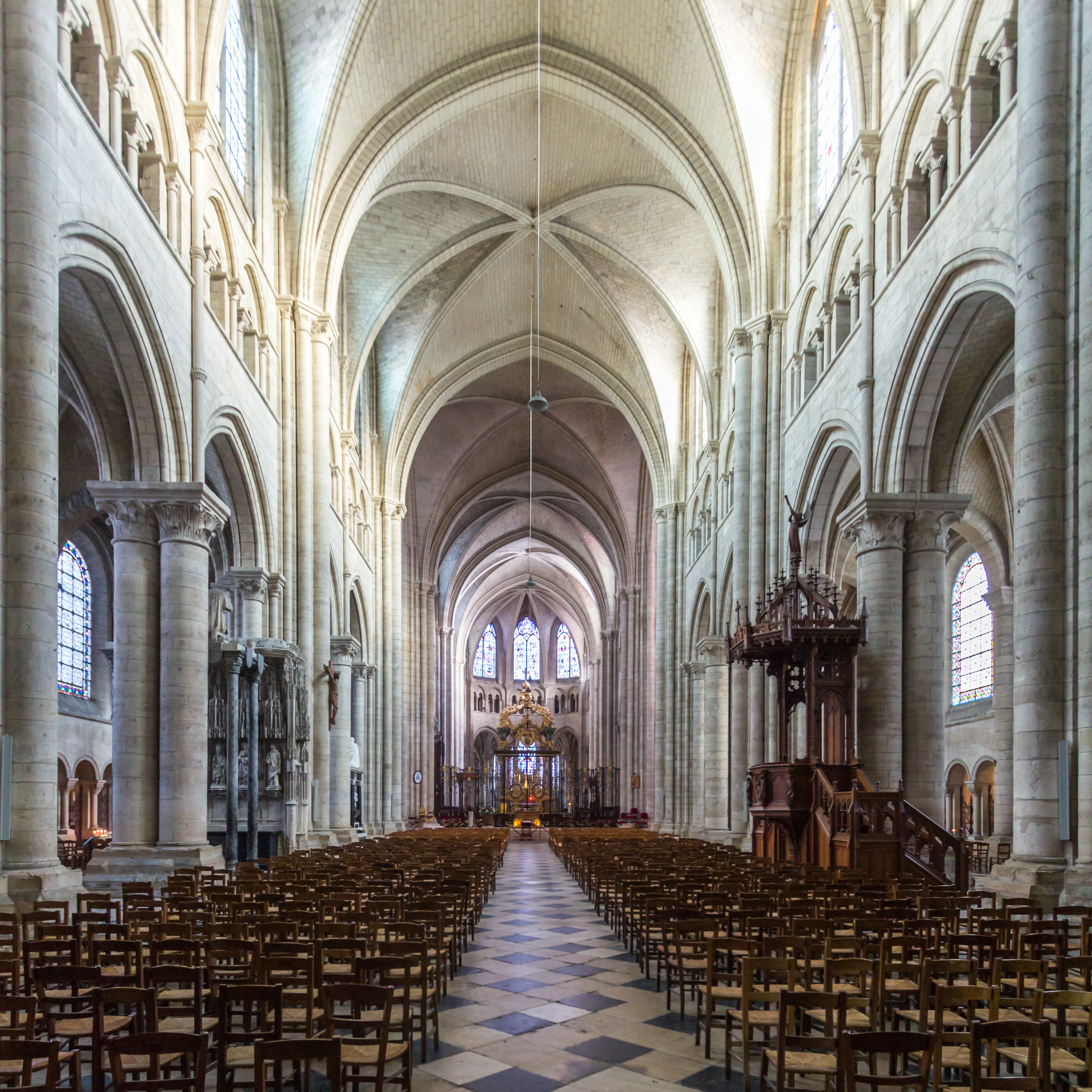
Sens Cathedral, looking east

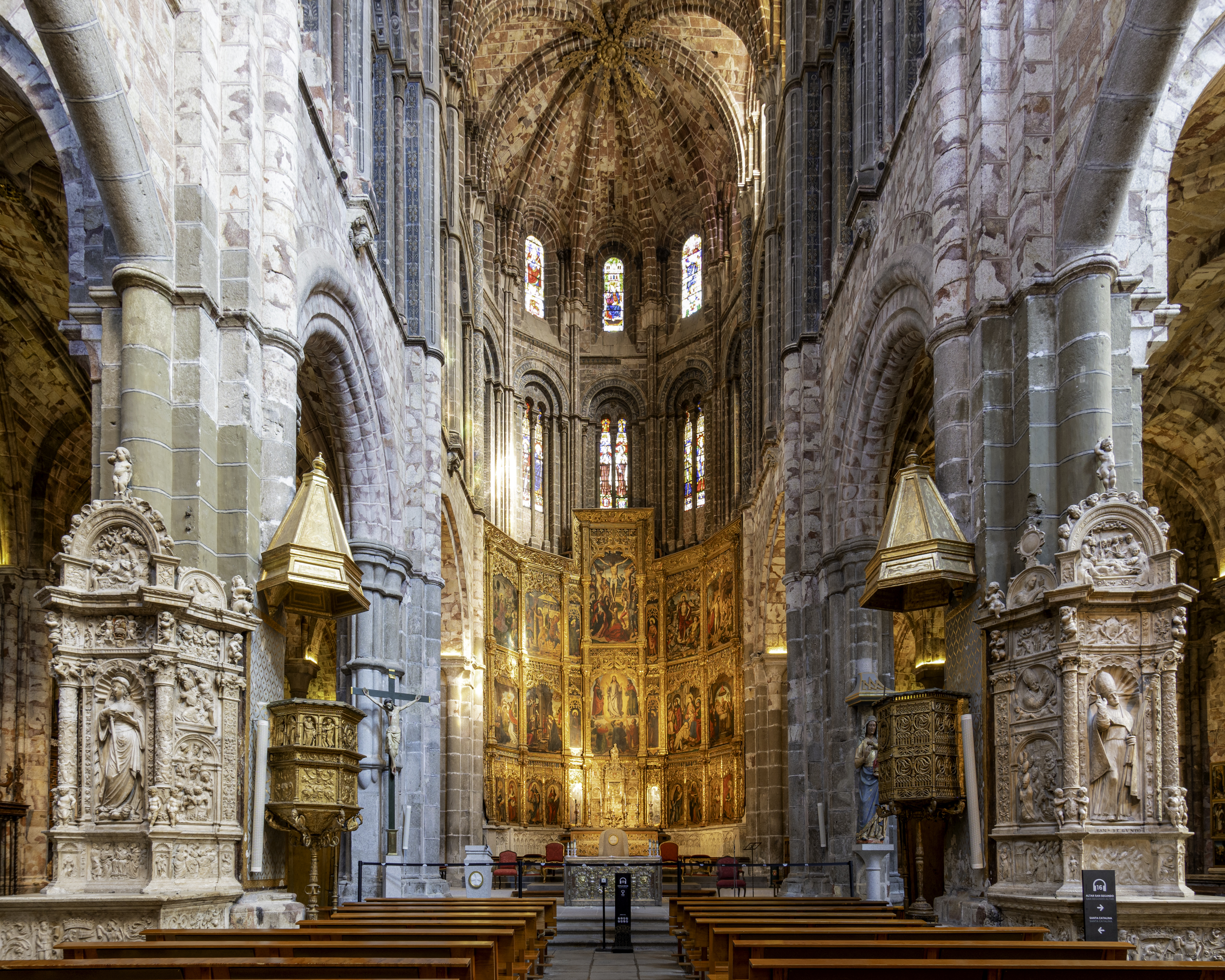
Ávila Cathedral, east end. The altarpiece is later.

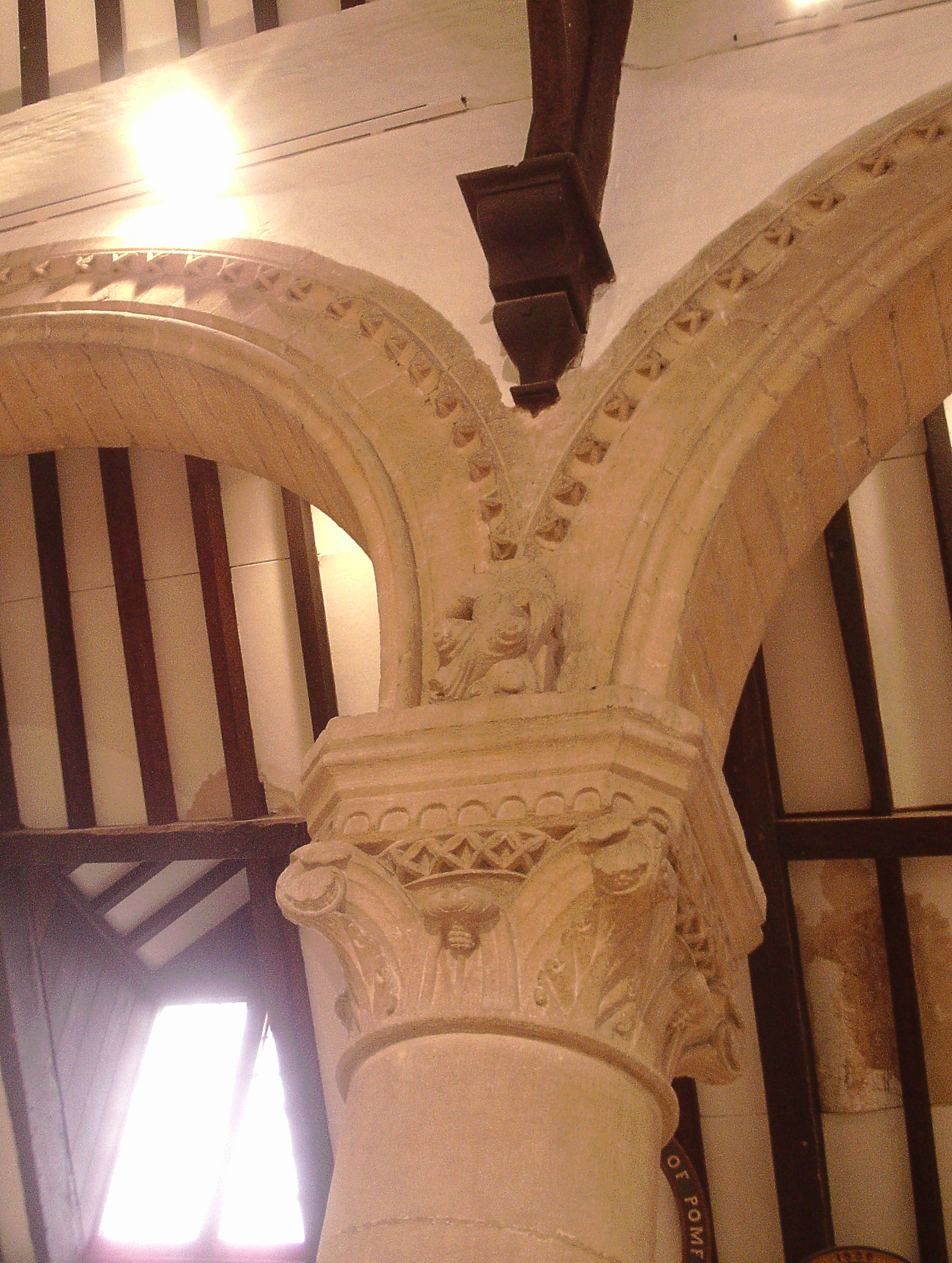
Arcade detail of Oakham Castle hall, England

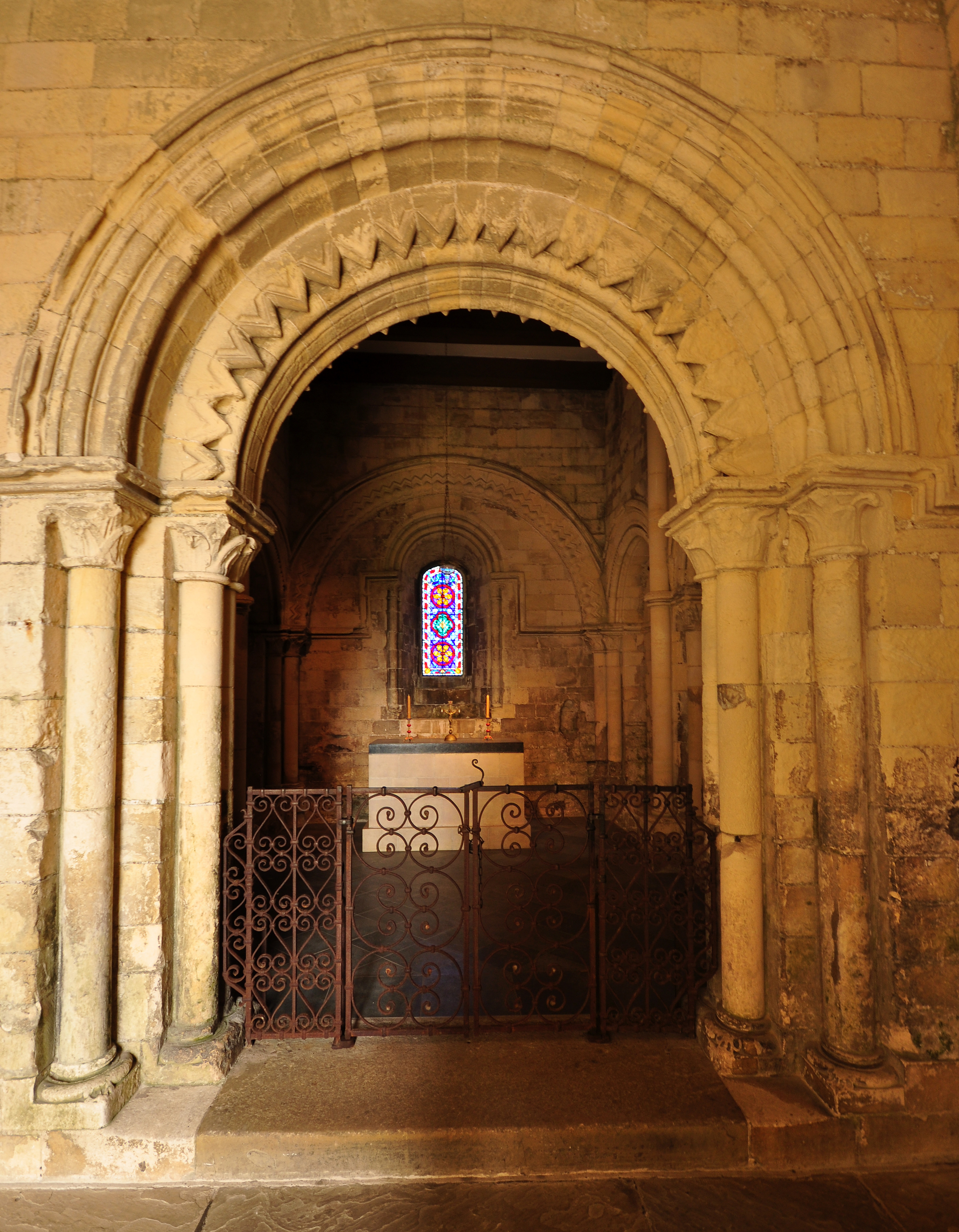
Chapel in the keep forebuilding, Dover Castle.

== See also ==
- Medieval architecture
- Romanesque architecture
- Early Gothic architecture
- Cistercian architecture
