= Gmina Wąchock =

Gmina Wąchock Wąchock Commune
- Gmina
- Coat of arms
- Interactive map of Gmina Wąchock
- Coordinates (Wąchock): 51°4′27″N 21°0′49″E
- Country: Poland
- Voivodeship: Świętokrzyskie
- County: Starachowice
- Seat: Wąchock

Area
  - Total: 81.84 km^{2} (31.60 sq mi)

Population (2006)
  - Total: 6,972
  - Density: 85.19/km^{2} (220.6/sq mi)
  - Urban: 2,760
  - Rural: 4,212
- Website: http://www.wachock.pl

Gmina Wąchock is an urban-rural gmina (administrative district) in Starachowice County, Świętokrzyskie Voivodeship, in south-central Poland. Its seat is the town of Wąchock, which lies approximately 5 kilometres (3 mi) north-west of Starachowice and 35 km (22 mi) north-east of the regional capital Kielce.

The gmina covers an area of 81.84 square kilometres (31.6 sq mi), and as of 2006 its total population is 6,972 (out of which the population of Wąchock amounts to 2,760, and the population of the rural part of the gmina is 4,212).

The gmina contains part of the protected area called Sieradowice Landscape Park.

== Villages ==
Apart from the town of Wąchock, Gmina Wąchock contains the villages and settlements of Marcinków, Parszów, Rataje, Węglów and Wielka Wieś.

== Neighbouring gminas ==
Gmina Wąchock is bordered by the towns of Skarżysko-Kamienna and Starachowice, and by the gminas of Bodzentyn, Brody, Mirzec, Pawłów, Skarżysko Kościelne and Suchedniów.
