= Second Mongol invasion of Poland =

1259–60 military campaign

- Part of the Mongol invasion of Europe
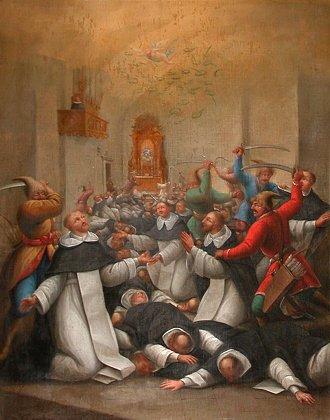
- Martyrdom of Sadok and 48 Dominican martyrs of Sandomierz during the Second Mongol invasion of Poland.
Date	Late 1259–Early 1260
Location	Parts of southern and eastern Poland
Result	Mongol–Ruthenian victory

Belligerents
Golden Horde; Kingdom of Galicia–Volhynia	Fragmented Poland: Silesia; Masovia; Sandomierz; Kraków; Greater Poland

Commanders and leaders
Berke; Burundai; Talabuga; Nogai; Vasylko Romanovych	Bolesław V the Chaste various others

Strength
20,000–30,000	9,000; 6,000 infantry 3,000 cavalry

Casualties and losses
Light	Heavy

The Second Mongol invasion of Poland was carried out by General Boroldai (Burundai) of the Golden Horde in 1259–1260. During this invasion the cities of Sandomierz, Kraków, Lublin, Zawichost, and Bytom were sacked by the Mongols for the second time.

== History ==
The invasion began in late 1259, after a powerful Mongol army had been sent to the Kingdom of Galicia–Volhynia in order to punish King Daniel of Galicia for his independent actions. King Daniel had to comply to Mongol demands, and in 1258, his forces joined the Mongols in the raid on the Grand Duchy of Lithuania. To weaken Daniel's position, the Golden Horde decided to attack his allies, Hungarian King Béla IV, and Duke of Kraków, Bolesław V the Chaste. Galician–Volhynian forces had to take part in the invasion on the side of Mongol army. These forces were led by Galician–Volhynian prince Vasylko Romanovych.

The purpose of the invasion was to loot the divided Kingdom of Poland (see Testament of Bolesław III Krzywousty), and to weaken Duke of Kraków Bolesław V the Chaste, whose province, Lesser Poland, began a process of fast development. According to the Mongol plan, the invaders were to enter Lesser Poland east of Lublin, and head towards Zawichost. After crossing the Vistula, the Mongol army was to break into two columns, operating north and south of the Holy Cross Mountains. The columns were to unite near Chęciny, and then head southwards, to Kraków. Altogether, Mongol forces under Boroldai were 30,000 strong, with Ruthenian units of King Daniel of Galicia, his brother Vasilko Romanovich, Kipchaks and probably Lithuanians or Yotvingians.

The events that took place in the Kingdom of Galicia–Volhynia echoed in Lesser Poland, and in late 1258, preparations for the defence of Kraków began. The work was quickly abandoned, and Piast dynasty dukes returned to their internal quarrels. In October 1259, right before the invasion, Duke of Greater Poland Bolesław the Pious allied himself with Duke Bolesław V the Chaste and Duke of Mazovia Siemowit I, in order to attack Duke of Kujawy, Casimir I of Kuyavia. A few weeks later, Lesser Poland was invaded by the Mongol hordes.

The Mongolian army concentrated near Chełm, and after capturing Polish towns east of the Vistula, the invaders appeared at Sandomierz (early December 1259). Boroldai ordered Ruthenian auxiliary units to besiege and capture the city, while main Mongol forces marched westwards toward the Holy Cross Mountains. Their march was marked by an orgy of destruction; among others, ancient abbeys of Koprzywnica and Wąchock were looted (most probably, they failed to capture the Łysa Góra Benedictine Abbey). The Mongols limited their advance to Radom in the north and Sulejów in the west, and did not enter other Polish provinces. The two columns of the invading army joined forces near Kielce and Chęciny, in mid-January 1260.

At the same time, the siege of Sandomierz continued. Defenders of the city fiercely resisted all attacks of the Mongol and Ruthenian forces. After several weeks, Mongol leaders began negotiations with the Poles, who were commanded by a man named Piotr of Krepa. Ruthenian princes, which took part in the siege, advised Piotr of Krepa to accept Mongol offers, and abandon Sandomierz, in exchange of safe passage for all residents of the city. Finally, facing hunger and epidemics, the Poles left Sandomierz on February 2, 1260; the Mongols broke their promise and massacred the civilians and the defenders. The city itself was looted and burned to the ground.

On February 5, main Mongol forces abandoned Sandomierz. All units joined forces on February 10–12, and entered densely populated southern Lesser Poland. After looting the abbeys at Jędrzejów, Mogiła, Szczyrzyc and Miechów, the invaders flooded the region in an orgy of murder and destruction. In the second half of February, the Mongols reached Kraków, quickly capturing the city. To prevent Silesian Piast dukes from sending their support to Lesser Poland, Boroldai sent some units to the area of Bytom. Duke Bolesław V the Chaste himself fled to Sieradz, with his wife Kinga of Poland.

In late March 1260, the Mongols left Lesser Poland eastward along the Carpathian foothills.

== Aftermath ==
Lesser Poland was devastated by the invasion, with the Mongols acquiring much rich loot from their expedition. Some 10,000 Poles were taken with the Mongol invaders as slaves. Through this invasion, the Golden Horde successfully managed to destroy Bolesław’s anti-Mongol alliance and fully subjugate the Kingdom of Galicia–Volhynia.
