= Wąchock =

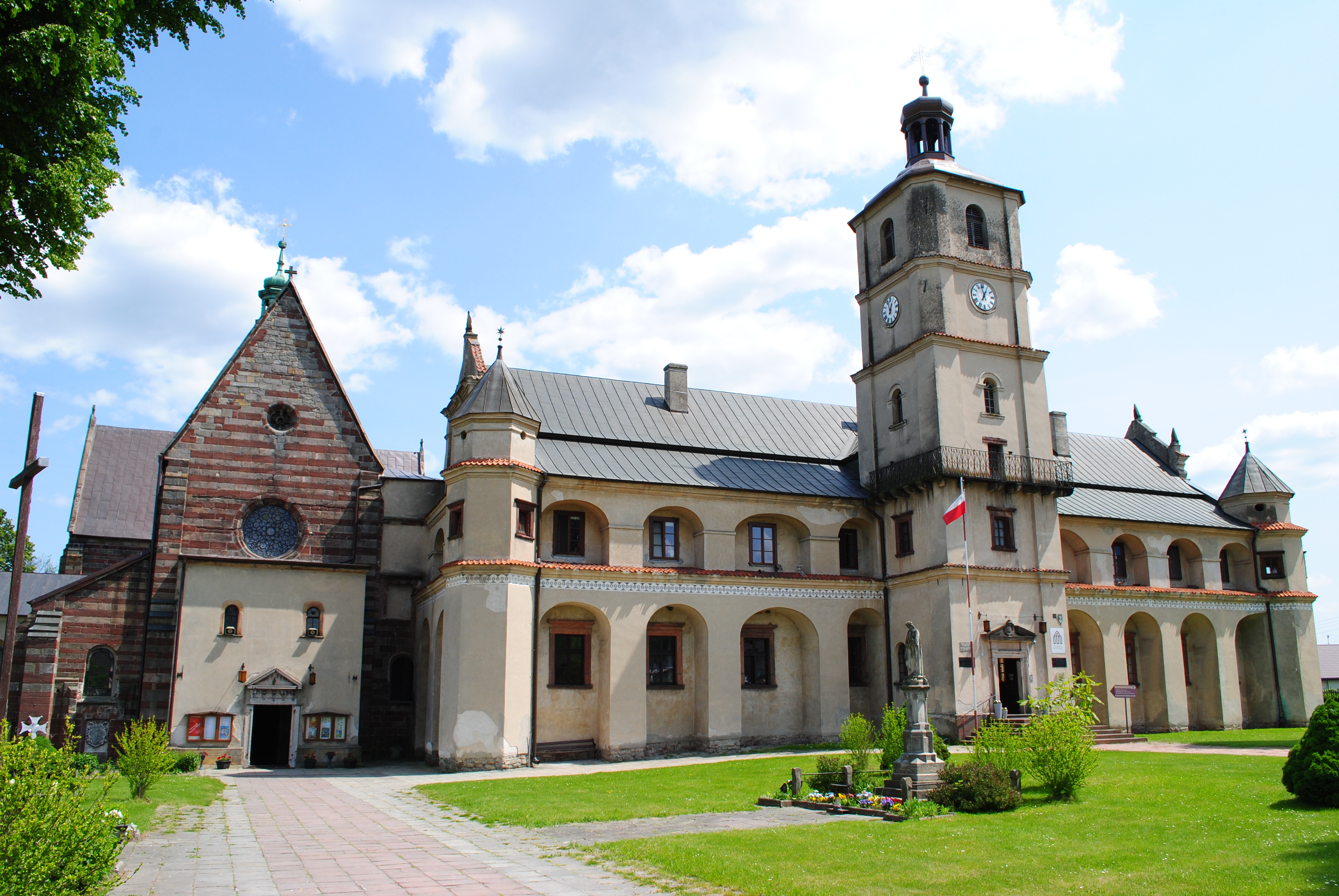
- Romanesque monastery in Wąchock

- Coat of arms

- Location within Poland
- Coordinates: 51°4′27″N 21°0′49″E
- Country: Poland
- Voivodeship: Świętokrzyskie
- County: Starachowice
- Gmina: Wąchock
- Established: twelfth century
- Town rights: 1454–1870, 1994

Government
  - Mayor: Robert Janus (Ind.)

Area
  - Total: 16.02 km^{2} (6.19 sq mi)

Population (2006)
  - Total: 2,760
  - Density: 172/km^{2} (446/sq mi)
- Time zone: UTC+1 (CET)
  - Summer (DST): UTC+2 (CEST)
- Postal code: 27-215
- Area code: +48 41
- Car plates: TST
- Website: http://www.wachock.pl

Wąchock [ˈvɔ̃xɔt͡sk] is a town in Starachowice County, Świętokrzyskie Voivodeship, in south-central Poland, near Starachowice, within the historical region of Lesser Poland. In 2006, it had 2,777 inhabitants.

== History ==
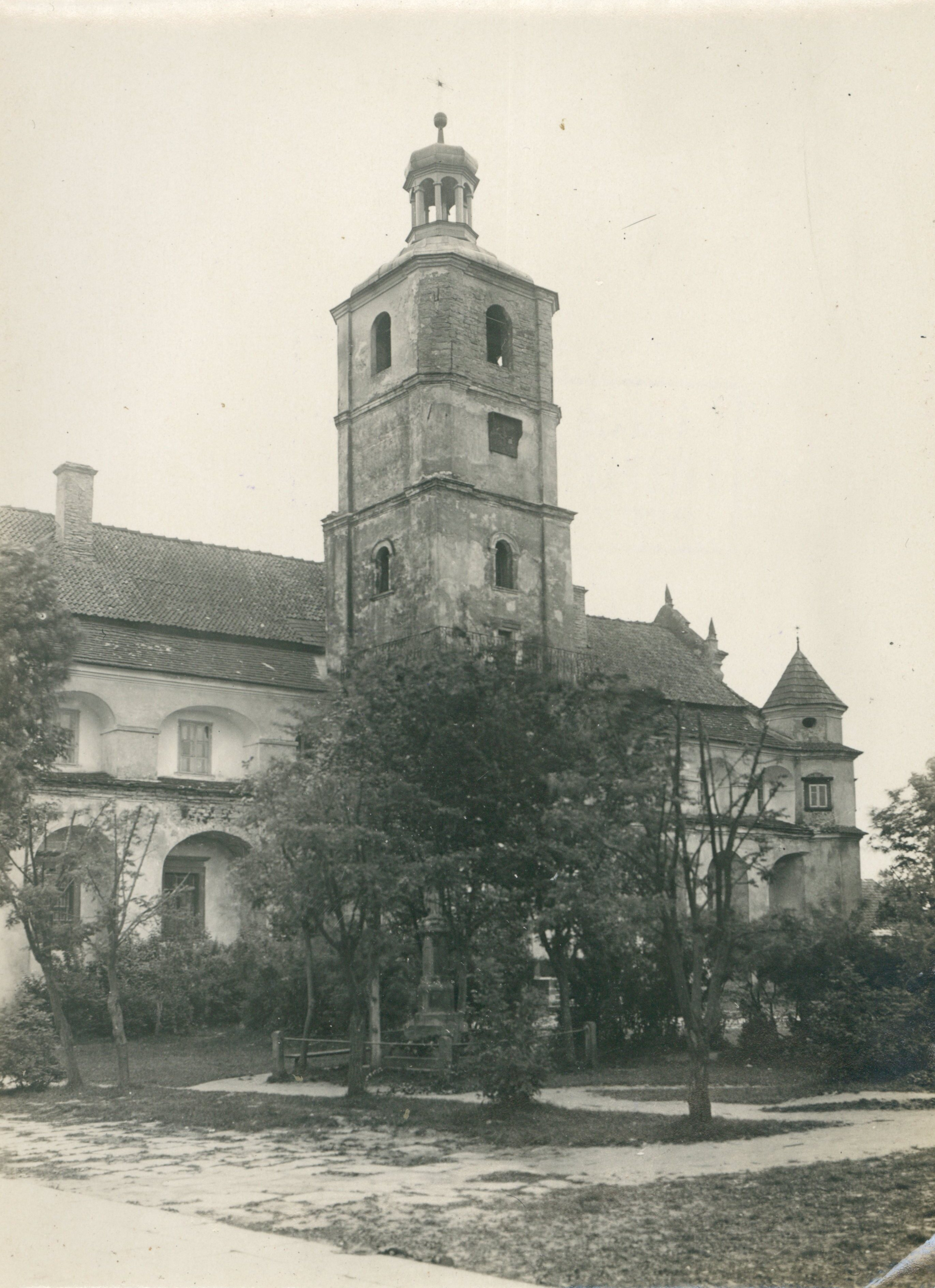
Wąchock Abbey in the interwar period

Wachock received its town charter in 1454, lost it in 1869, and regained in 1994.

Wąchock is first mentioned in historical records from 1179. In the 13th century, a Cistercian abbey was founded here, and today its buildings form the most notable sight in the town. The abbey emerged as one of the richest institutions of this kind. Monks from Wąchock contributed to the development of early industry along the Kamienna river, opening metal plants in several locations. In 1454, Wąchock received its Magdeburg rights from King Casimir IV Jagiellon, and the town, together with the abbey, was frequently raided and destroyed - by the Mongols in 1259–1260 (see Mongol invasion of Poland), the Swedes in 1655, and the Transilvanians in 1657 (see The Deluge). In 1819, the abbey was taken over by the government of Russian-controlled Congress Poland, and the monks did not return there until 1951.

Despite the existence of a rich and powerful monastery, Wąchock itself never became an important center of the Sandomierz Voivodeship in the Lesser Poland Province. This was because both Bishops of Kraków (who owned nearby town of Bodzentyn), and Benedictine monks from the Łysa Góra monastery blocked any attempts at Wąchock's development. In 1624, Benedictines from Święty Krzyż founded the town of Wierzbnik (later: Starachowice), which emerged as a competition to Wąchock. Nevertheless, Wąchock was one of early centers of Polish industry - in 1500, out of 289 forges in the Kingdom of Poland, as many as 22 operated here.

In 1795, following the Third Partition of Poland, the town was annexed by Austria. After the Polish victory in the Austro-Polish War of 1809, it became part of the short-lived Duchy of Warsaw, and after the duchy's dissolution in 1815, the town became part of Russian-controlled Congress Poland. In January 1863, soon after the January Uprising broke out, General Marian Langiewicz assembled a group of 1,400 Polish rebels, whose purpose was to attack Russian-held Warsaw. A battle with the Russians took place here on February 3, 1863. In 1869, Russian authorities, in revenge of the town's aid to the insurgents, deprived Wąchock of its city rights. The village was flooded by the Kamienna river in 1903, and in 1918, it became part of Second Polish Republic’s Kielce Voivodeship. Following World War I, in 1918, Poland regained independence and control of Małogoszcz. According to the 1921 census, Małogoszcz with the adjacent railway settlement had a population of 2,389, of which 88.6% declared Polish nationality and 11.4% declared Jewish nationality.

During World War II, Home Army units under Jan Piwnik were particularly active in the area of Wąchock. There now is a monument of Jan Piwnik in the town.

== Transport ==
The town lies on National Road Nr. 42, and has a rail station on a route from Skarżysko-Kamienna to Sandomierz.

== Culture ==
=== Points of interest ===
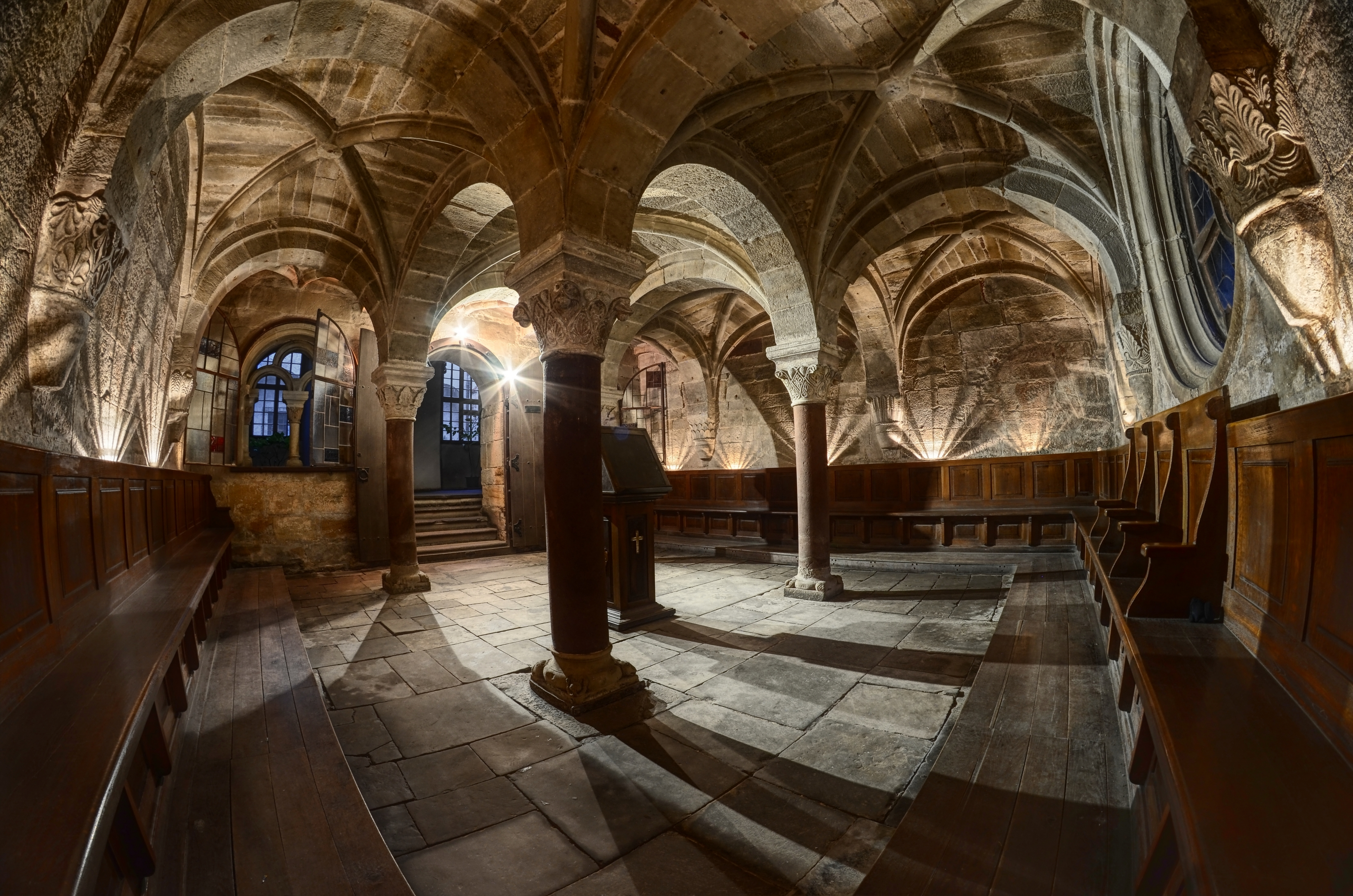
Chapter house at the Cistercian abbey

Among major points of interest are:

- Complex of Cistercian church and abbey (12th century),
- Roman parish church (13th century), with additions from the 16th and 19th centuries, and the 17th century interior,
- ruins of a metal plant (first half of the 19th century),
- former roadside inn, which was the headquarters of Marian Langiewicz in the 1860s.

=== Humour ===
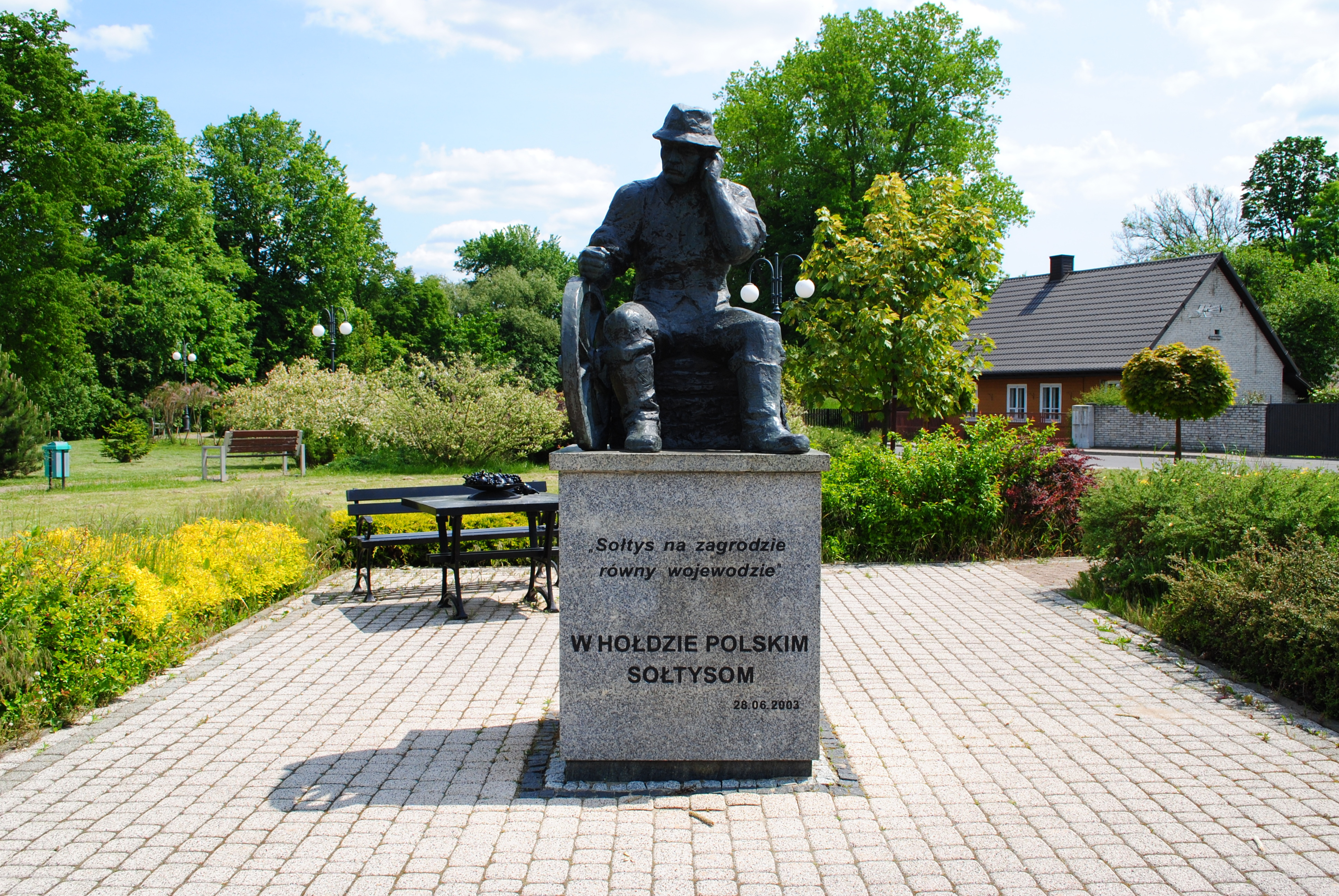
The monument to the sołtys

Wąchock is famous across Poland for jokes about its inhabitants, and especially their sołtys (referring to the times when Wąchock was a village). For example, the cat of the sołtys was so smart that when given some coffee with milk, he drank all the milk while leaving all the coffee. It is unclear when and why Wąchock had become a butt of the jokes, although there are several theories.

Typically, the Wąchock jokes are the question-answer ones: "Why nobody in Wąchock watches TV now? - Because sołtys put blinds on his windows."

The town organizes the annual meeting of sołtyses.

In 1988 there was a documentary by Józef Gębski, with a grain of humour, about the elections of the sołtys of Wąchock, "Sołtys Wąchocka, czyli jak ponownie wygrać wybory" ["Sołtys of Wąchock, or How to Win the Elections Again"] .

== See also ==
- Wąchock Reservoir by Kamienna river
